= Communicative language teaching =

Approach to language education

Communicative language teaching (CLT), or the communicative approach (CA), is an approach to language teaching that emphasizes interaction as both the means and the ultimate goal of study. Within CLT, the goal is the ability to communicate in the target language. This is in contrast to previous views in which grammatical competence was commonly given top priority.

Learners in settings which utilise CLT learn and practice the target language through the following activities: communicating with one another and the instructor in the target language; studying "authentic texts" (those written in the target language for purposes other than language learning); and using the language both in class and outside of class.

To promote language skills in all types of situations, learners converse about personal experiences with partners, and instructors teach topics outside of the realm of traditional grammar. CLT also claims to encourage learners to incorporate their personal experiences into their language learning environment and to focus on the learning experience, in addition to learning the target language.

CLT also positions the teacher as a facilitator, rather than an instructor. The approach is a non-methodical system that does not use a textbook series to teach the target language but works on developing sound oral and verbal skills prior to reading and writing.

== Background ==
=== Societal influences ===
The rise of CLT in the 1970s and the early 1980s was partly in response to the limited success with traditional language teaching methods and partly by the increase in demand for language learning. In Europe, the advent of the European Common Market, an economic predecessor to the European Union, led to migration in Europe and an increased number of people who needed to learn a foreign language for work or personal reasons. Meanwhile, more children were given the opportunity to learn foreign languages in school, as the number of secondary schools offering languages rose worldwide as part of a general trend of curriculum-broadening and modernization, with foreign-language study no longer confined to the elite academies. In Britain, the introduction of comprehensive schools, which offered foreign-language study to all children, rather than to the select few of the elite grammar schools, greatly increased the demand for language learning.

The increased demand included many learners who struggled with traditional methods such as grammar translation, which involves the direct translation of sentence after sentence as a way to learn the language. Those methods assumed that students aimed to master the target language and were willing to study for years before expecting to use the language in real life. However, those assumptions were challenged by adult learners, who were busy with work, and by schoolchildren who were less academically gifted and so could not devote years to learning before they could use the language. Educators realized that to motivate those students an approach with a more immediate reward was necessary, and they began to use CLT, an approach that emphasizes communicative ability and yielded better results.

=== Academic influences ===
Already in the late 19th century, the American educator John Dewey was writing about learning by doing, and later that learning should be based on the learner's interests and experiences. In 1963, American psychologist David Ausubel released his book The Psychology of Meaningful Verbal Learning calling for a holistic approach to learners teaching through meaningful material. American educator Clifford Prator published a paper in 1965 calling for teachers to turn from an emphasis on manipulation (drills) towards communication where learners were free to choose their own words. In 1966, the sociolinguist Dell Hymes posited the concept of communicative competence considerably broadening out Noam Chomsky's syntactic concept of competence. Also, in 1966, American psychologist Jerome Bruner wrote that learners construct their own understanding of the world based on their experiences and prior knowledge, and teachers should provide scaffolding to promote this. Bruner appears to have been influenced by Lev Vygotsky, a Russian psychologist whose zone of proximal development is a similar concept.

Later in the 1970s British linguist M.A.K. Halliday studied how language functions are expressed through grammar.

The development of communicative language teaching was bolstered by these academic ideas. Before the growth of communicative language teaching, the primary method of language teaching was situational language teaching, a method that was much more clinical in nature and relied less on direct communication. In Britain, applied linguists began to doubt the efficacy of situational language teaching, partly in response to Chomsky's insights into the nature of language. Chomsky had shown that the structural theories of language then prevalent could not explain the variety that is found in real communication. In addition, applied linguists like Christopher Candlin and Henry Widdowson observed that the current model of language learning was ineffective in classrooms. They saw a need for students to develop communicative skill and functional competence in addition to mastering language structures.

In 1966, the linguist and anthropologist Dell Hymes developed the concept of communicative competence, which redefined what it meant to "know" a language. In addition to speakers having mastery over the structural elements of language, they must also be able to use those structural elements appropriately in a variety of speech domains. That can be neatly summed up by Hymes's statement: "There are rules of use without which the rules of grammar would be useless." The idea of communicative competence stemmed from Chomsky's concept of the linguistic competence of an ideal native speaker. Hymes did not make a concrete formulation of communicative competence, but subsequent authors, notably Michael Canale, have tied the concept to language teaching. Canale and Swain (1980) defined communicative competence in terms of three components: grammatical competence, sociolinguistic competence, and strategic competence. Canale (1983) refined the model by adding discourse competence, which contains the concepts of cohesion and coherence.

An influential development in the history of communicative language teaching was the work of the Council of Europe in creating new language syllabi. When communicative language teaching had effectively replaced situational language teaching as the standard by leading linguists, the Council of Europe made an effort to once again bolster the growth of the new method, which led to the Council of Europe creating a new language syllabus. Education was a high priority for the Council of Europe, which set out to provide a syllabus that would meet the needs of European immigrants. Among the studies that it used in designing the course was one by a British linguist, D. A. Wilkins, that defined language using "notions" and "functions," rather than more traditional categories of grammar and vocabulary. The new syllabus reinforced the idea that language could not be adequately explained by grammar and syntax but instead relied on real interaction.

In the mid-1990s, the Dogme 95 manifesto influenced language teaching through the Dogme language teaching movement. It proposed that published materials stifle the communicative approach. As such, the aim of the Dogme approach to language teaching is to focus on real conversations about practical subjects in which communication is the engine of learning. The idea behind the Dogme approach is that communication can lead to explanation, which leads to further learning. That approach is the antithesis of situational language teaching, which emphasizes learning by text and prioritizes grammar over communication.

A survey of communicative competence by Bachman (1990) divides competency into the broad headings of "organizational competence," which includes both grammatical and discourse (or textual) competence, and "pragmatic competence," which includes both sociolinguistic and "illocutionary" competence. Strategic competence is associated with the interlocutors' ability in using communication strategies.

== Classroom activities ==
CLT teachers choose classroom activities based on what they believe will be most effective for students developing communicative abilities in the target language (TL). Oral activities are popular among CLT teachers compared to grammar drills or reading and writing activities, because they include active conversation and creative, unpredicted responses from students. Activities vary based on the level of language class they are used in. They promote collaboration, fluency, and comfort in the TL. The six activities listed and explained below are commonly used in CLT classrooms.

=== Role-play ===
Role-play is an oral activity usually done in pairs, whose main goal is to develop students' communicative abilities in a certain setting.

Example:

1. The instructor sets the scene: where is the conversation taking place? (E.g., in a café, in a park, etc.)
2. The instructor defines the goal of the students' conversation. (E.g., the speaker is asking for directions, the speaker is ordering coffee, the speaker is talking about a movie they recently saw, etc.)
3. The students converse in pairs for a designated amount of time.

This activity gives students the chance to improve their communication skills in the TL in a low-pressure situation. Most students are more comfortable speaking in pairs rather than in front of the entire class.

Instructors need to be aware of the differences between a conversation and an utterance. Students may use the same utterances repeatedly when doing this activity and not actually have a creative conversation. If instructors do not regulate what kinds of conversations students are having, then the students might not be truly improving their communication skills.

=== Interviews ===
An interview is an oral activity done in pairs, whose main goal is to develop students' interpersonal skills in the TL.

Example:

1. The instructor gives each student the same set of questions to ask a partner.
2. Students take turns asking and answering the questions in pairs.

This activity, since it is highly structured, allows for the instructor to more closely monitor students' responses. It can zone in on one specific aspect of grammar or vocabulary, while still being a primarily communicative activity and giving the students communicative benefits.

This is an activity that should be used primarily in the lower levels of language classes, because it will be most beneficial to lower-level speakers. Higher-level speakers should be having unpredictable conversations in the TL, where neither the questions nor the answers are scripted or expected. If this activity were used with higher-level speakers it wouldn't have many benefits.

=== Group work ===
Group work is a collaborative activity whose purpose is to foster communication in the TL, in a larger group setting.

Example:

1. Students are assigned a group of no more than six people.
2. Students are assigned a specific role within the group. (E.g., member A, member B, etc.)
3. The instructor gives each group the same task to complete.
4. Each member of the group takes a designated amount of time to work on the part of the task to which they are assigned.
5. The members of the group discuss the information they have found, with each other and put it all together to complete the task.

Students can feel overwhelmed in language classes, but this activity can take away from that feeling. Students are asked to focus on one piece of information only, which increases their comprehension of that information. Better comprehension leads to better communication with the rest of the group, which improves students' communicative abilities in the TL.

Instructors should monitor that each student to ensure they're contributing equally to the group effort. It requires the instructor to design the activity well, so that students will contribute equally, and benefit equally from the activity.

=== Information gap ===
Information gap is a collaborative activity, whose purpose is for students to effectively obtain information that was previously unknown to them, in the TL.

Example:

1. The class is paired up. One partner in each pair is Partner A, and the other is Partner B.
2. All the students that are Partner A are given a sheet of paper with a time-table on it. The time-table is filled in half-way, but some of the boxes are empty.
3. All the students that are Partner B are given a sheet of paper with a time-table on it. The boxes that are empty on Partner A's time-table are filled in on Partner B's. There are also empty boxes on Partner B's time-table, but they are filled in on Partner A's.
4. The partners must work together to ask about and supply each other with the information they are both missing, to complete each other's time-tables.

Completing information gap activities improves students' abilities to communicate about unknown information in the TL. These abilities are directly applicable to many real-world conversations, where the goal is to find out some new piece of information, or simply to exchange information.

Instructors should not overlook the fact that their students need to be prepared to communicate effectively for this activity. They need to know certain vocabulary words, certain structures of grammar, etc. If the students have not been well prepared for the task at hand, then they will not communicate effectively.

=== Opinion sharing ===
Opinion sharing is a content-based activity, whose purpose is to engage students' conversational skills, while talking about something they care about.

Example:

1. The instructor introduces a topic and asks students to contemplate their opinions about it. (E.g., dating, school dress codes, global warming)
2. The students talk in pairs or small groups, debating their opinions on the topic.

Opinion sharing encourages more introverted students to open up and share their opinions. If a student has a strong opinion about a certain topic, then they will speak up and share.

Respect is key with this activity. If a student does not feel like their opinion is respected by the instructor or their peers, then they will not feel comfortable sharing, and they will not receive the communicative benefits of this activity.

=== Scavenger hunt ===
A scavenger hunt is a mingling activity that promotes open interaction between students.

Example:

1. The instructor gives students a sheet with instructions on it. (e.g. Find someone who has a birthday in the same month as yours.)
2. Students go around the classroom asking and answering questions about each other.
3. The students wish to find all of the answers they need to complete the scavenger hunt.

In doing this activity, students have the opportunity to speak with a number of classmates, while still being in a low-pressure situation, and talking to only one person at a time. After learning more about each other, and getting to share about themselves, students will feel more comfortable talking and sharing during other communicative activities.

Since this activity is not as structured as some of the others, it is important for instructors to add structure. If certain vocabulary should be used in students' conversations, or a certain grammar is necessary to complete the activity, then instructors should incorporate that into the scavenger hunt.

== Criticism ==
Although CLT has been extremely influential in the field of language teaching, it is not universally accepted and has been subject to significant critique.

In his critique of CLT, Michael Swan addresses both the theoretical and practical problems with CLT. He mentions that CLT is not an altogether cohesive subject but one in which theoretical understandings (by linguists) and practical understandings (by language teachers) differ greatly. Criticism of the theory of CLT includes that it makes broad claims regarding the usefulness of CLT while citing little data, it uses a large amount of confusing vocabulary, and it assumes knowledge that is predominately not language-specific (such as the ability to make educated guesses) to be language-specific. Swan suggests that those theoretical issues lead to confusion in the application of CLT techniques.

Where confusion in the application of CLT techniques is readily apparent is in classroom settings. Swan suggests that CLT techniques often suggest prioritizing the "function" of a language (what one can do with the language knowledge one has) over the "structure" of a language (the grammatical systems of the language). That priority can leave learners with serious gaps in their knowledge of the formal aspects of their target language. Swan also suggests that in CLT techniques, the languages that a student might already know are not valued or employed in instructional techniques.

Further critique of CLT techniques in classroom teaching can be attributed to Elaine Ridge. One of her criticisms of CLT is that it falsely implies that there is a general consensus regarding the definition of "communicative competence," which CLT claims to facilitate. Because there is no such agreement, students may be seen to be in possession of "communicative competence" without being able to make full or even adequate use of the language. That individuals are proficient in a language does not necessarily entail that they can make full use of that language, which can limit an individual's potential with that language, especially if that language is an endangered language. That criticism largely has to do with the fact that CLT is often highly praised and is popular though it may not necessarily be the best method of language teaching.

Ridge also notes that CLT has nonspecific requirements of its teachers, as there is no completely standard definition of what CLT is, which is especially true for the teaching of grammar, the formal rules governing the standardized version of the language in question. Some critics of CLT suggest that the method does not put enough emphasis on the teaching of grammar and instead allows students to produce utterances, despite being grammatically incorrect, as long as the interlocutor can get some meaning from them.

Stephen Bax's critique of CLT has to do with the context of its implementation. Bax asserts that many researchers associate the use of CLT techniques with modernity and so the lack of CLT techniques as a lack of modernism. That way, those researchers consider teachers or school systems that fail to use CLT techniques as outdated and suggest that their students learn the target language "in spite of" the absence of CLT techniques, as if CLT were the only way to learn a language, and everyone who fails to implement its techniques is ignorant and cannot teach the target language.

== See also ==
- English as an additional language
- Grammar–translation method
- Language education
- Language exchange
- Learning by teaching (LdL)
- Notional-functional syllabus
- Task-based language teaching
- Teaching English as a foreign language
- Target language (translation)
