= Language survey =

A language survey is conducted around the world for a variety of reasons.

- Measuring people's ability to speak and understand another language (usually community based, not school based) (multilingualism)
- studying people's attitudes about different languages
- evaluating the differences and similarities in speech of communities that speak related speech forms, noting comprehension or collecting details of linguistic form (dialectology)
- assessing the vitality of languages that may be disappearing (language death)
- doing initial descriptions of languages in areas that are linguistically undescribed

== Methods ==
Methods used in language surveys depend on the questions that the survey is trying to answer. Methods used include collecting word lists, playing recorded texts to assess comprehension, sentence repetition tests, questionnaires, group and individual interviews, retelling of stories, direct observation, pointing to pictures after listening to instructions, and even internet surveys.

There is a growing trend to involve communities more in language survey, using a variety of methods.

As with any form of research, the methods used depend on the questions that the researchers are trying to answer. Also, the reliability of the results varies according to the method and the rigor with which it is applied, proper sampling technique, etc.

== Applications ==
The results of language surveys are use for a variety of purposes. One of the most common is in making decisions for implementing educational programs. The results have also been used for making decision for language development work (Holbrook, 2001). And of course, academics are always interested in the results of any language survey.

== Agencies ==
Surveys have also been conducted by ethnic associations (Saskatchewan 1991), government agencies (Statistics Canada 1993), NGO's (Toba, et al. 2002), foundations (Pew Hispanic Center 2004), etc. Often such groups work together (Clifton 2002). Some large and notable surveys include the Linguistic Survey of India which was begun by George Abraham Grierson late in the 19th century (Sociolinguistics research in India) and the Survey of Language Use and Language Teaching in East Africa, sponsored by the Ford Foundation from the 1960s. Both resulted in a number of volumes describing locations of languages, patterns of multilingualism, language classification, and also included descriptions of languages, such as Language in Ethiopia (Bender, Bowen, Cooper, and Ferguson 1976). The single agency conducting the most language surveys around the world is SIL Global (formerly Summer Institute of Linguistics).

Language survey work is also done by academics, such as graduate students doing dissertation or thesis work or faculty members doing research.

== Sign languages ==
Surveys have usually been conducted among spoken languages. However, surveys have also been done among users of sign languages (Vasishta, Woodward, and Wilson 1978, Woodward 1991, 1993, 1996, Parkhurst & Parkhurst 1998, Al-Fityani & Padden 2008). As with surveys among spoken languages, surveys among sign languages have studied multilingualism, attitudes about various languages both spoken and signed (Ciupek-Reed 2012), differences and similarities between signed varieties (Aldersson and McEntee-Atalianis 2007, Bickford 1991, 2005, Parks 2011), and assessing the vitality of signed languages, and initial descriptions of undocumented sign languages. Adopting and adapting the concept of "extensibility" from spoken languages, Jason Hopkins wrote about how this could be applied to surveying sign languages. Sentence Repetition Tests have also been used for assessing people's ability in a sign language.

== References: sample survey reports ==
- Acharya, A. S. 1976. Tiptur Kannada. Linguistic Survey of India Series, no. 8. Poona: Deccan College Postgraduate and Research Institute.
- Aldersson, Russell R. and Lisa J. McEntee-Atalianis. 2007. A Lexical Comparison of Icelandic Sign Language and Danish Sign Language. Birkbeck Studies in Applied Linguistics 2 Icelandic & Danish Sign Languages
- Al-Fityani, Kinda & Carole Padden. 2008. A lexical comparison of sign languages in the Arab world. In R. M. de Quadros (Ed.), Sign languages: Spinning and unraveling the past, present, and future. TISLR9, forty five papers and three posters from the 9th Theoretical Issues in Sign Language Research Conference. Florianopolis, Brazil, December 2006. Petrópolis, RJ, Brazil: Editora Arara Azul. Downloadable
- Backstrom, Peter C. 1992. "Wakhi." In Peter C. Backstrom and Carla J. Radloff (eds.), Languages of northern areas, 57-74. Sociolinguistic Survey of Northern Pakistan, 2. Islamabad: National Institute of Pakistan Studies, Quaid-i-Azam University and Summer Institute of Linguistics.
- Bender, M. L. 1971. The languages of Ethiopia. A new lexicostatistic classification and some problems of diffusion. Anthropological Linguistics 13(5): 165-288.
- Bender, M. L., J. D. Bowen, R. L. Cooper, and C. A. Ferguson. 1976. Language in Ethiopia. London: Oxford University Press.
- Beyer, Daniela and Simone Beck. 2011. A Linguistic Assessment of the Munji language in Afghanistan. Language Documentation and Conservation 6: 38-103.
- Bickford, J. Albert. 1991. Lexical variation in Mexican Sign Language. Sign Language Studies 72:241–276.
- Bickford, J. Albert. 2005. The signed languages of Eastern Europe. SIL Electronic Survey Reports 2005-026: 45. http://www.sil.org/silesr/abstract.asp?ref=2005-026
- Clifton, John M., editor. 2002. Studies in languages of Azerbaijan, vol. 1,2. Baku, Azerbaijan and St. Petersburg, Russia: Institute of International Relations, Academy of Sciences of Azerbaijan and North Eurasian Group, SIL International.
- Clifton, John M., editor. 2005. Studies in languages of Tajikistan. Dushanbe, Tajikistan: National State University of Tajikistan; St. Petersburg, Russia : North Eurasia Group, SIL International.
- Egland, Steven T., ed. 1978. La inteligibilidad interdialectal en México: Resultados de algunos sondeos. Mexico: Instituto Lingüístico de Verano.
- Ferreira, Jo-Anne and David Holbrook. 2002. Are they dying? The case of some French-lexifier creoles. La Torre 7(25): 367-397.
- Holbrook, David. 2001. "Exploring the potential for Creole language development through religious literature: the current sociolinguistic situation in Guyana, South America." La Torre 6(19): 75-90.
- Jernudd, Bjorn H. 1979. The language survey of Sudan. The first phase: a questionnaire survey in schools. Acta universitatis umensis 22.
- King, Julie K. and John Wayne King, editors. 1984. Languages of Sabah: a survey report. (Pacific Linguistics C, 78.) Canberra: Australian National University.
- Labov, William. 1982. The social stratification of English in New York City. Washington, D. C.: Center for Applied Linguistics.
- Lewis, M. Paul. 1987. "Un estudio de la sociología de lenguaje del idioma quiché." Winak 2(4): 249-55.
- Rensch, Calvin R. 1992. "The language environment of Hindko-speaking people." In Calvin R. Rensch, Calinda E. Hallberg and Clare F. O'Leary (eds.), Hindko and Gujari, 3-88. Sociolinguistic Survey of Northern Pakistan, 3. Islamabad: National Institute of Pakistan Studies and Summer Institute of Linguistics.
- Saskatchewan Indigenous Languages Committee. (1991). Socio-linguistic survey of Indigenous languages in Saskatchewan: On the critical list. Saskatoon, Sask.: Saskatchewan Indigenous Languages Committee.
- Statistics Canada. (1993). 1991 Aboriginal peoples survey: Language, tradition, health, lifestyle and social issues. Catalogue No. 89-533. Ottawa: Statistics Canada, Post Censal Surveys Program.
- Toba, Sueyoshi, Ingrid Toba and Novel Kishore Rai. 2002. UNESCO language survey report Nepal. Kathmandu: UNESCO.
- Vasishta, M., J. C. Woodward, and K. L. Wilson. 1978. Sign Language in India: Regional Variation within the Deaf Population. Indian Journal of Applied Linguistics 4 (2): 66–74.

== References: survey methodology ==
- Blair, Frank, 1990. Survey on a Shoestring: A Manual for Small-Scale Language Surveys. Dallas: Summer Institute of Linguistics and the University of Texas at Arlington.
- Busch, Brigitta. 2018. The language portrait in multilingualism research: Theoretical and methodological considerations. Working Papers in Urban Language and Literacies 236, 1-13, King's College London, UK.
- Casad, Eugene H. 1974. Dialect intelligibility testing. Summer Institute of Linguistics Publications in Linguistics and Related Fields, 38. Norman: Summer Institute of Linguistics of the University of Oklahoma.
- Casad, Eugene H. 1993. Language area surveys. International Journal of Applied Linguistics 8: 29-49.
- Ciupek-Reed, Julia. 2012. Participatory methods in sociolinguistic sign language survey: A case study in El Salvador. University of North Dakota MA thesis. Ciupek-Reed's thesis
- Cooper, R. L. and S. Carpenter. 1976. Language in the Market. In Language in Ethiopia, ed. by Bender, M. L., J. D. Bowen, R. L. Cooper, and C. A. Ferguson, pp. 244–255. London: Oxford University Press.
- Downey, Michael P. 1986. "Survey methods and their insights into the acceptability of literature among related varieties." Studies in Philippine Linguistics 6(2): 94-180
- Ferguson, Charles. 1975 "On sociolinguistically oriented language surveys." From S. Ohannessian, C. Ferguson and E. Polome (eds.), Language surveys in developing nations, p. 1-5. Washington, D.C.: Center for Applied Linguistics.
- Gooskens, Charlotte and Cindy Schneider. 2016. Testing mutual intelligibility between closely related languages in an oral society. Language Documentation & Conservation Vol. 10: 278–30.
- Hickerson, Harold, Glen D. Turner, and Nancy P. Hickerson. 1962. "Testing procedures for estimating transfer of information among Iroquois dialects and languages." International Journal of American Linguistics 18: 1-8.
- Hochstetler, Lee and Tim Tillinghast. 1996. "Discussion on sociolinguistic questionnaires." Notes on Literature in Use and Language Programs 48: 48-61.
- Ibarra, Francisco Martínez. 2012. Qualitative Research and the Study of Language Use and Attitudes. Retrospective Methods Network, RMN Newsletter, special issue: "Approaching Methodology" pp. 75-80.
- McKinnie, Meghan and Tom Priestly. 2004. Telling tales out of school: assessing linguistic competence in minority language fieldwork. Journal of Multilingual and Multicultural Development 25(1): 24-40.
- Parkhurst, Stephen and Dianne Parkhurst. 1998. Introduction to Sign Language survey. Notes on Sociolinguistics 3: 215-42.
- Parks, Jason. 2011. Sign language word list comparisons: Toward a replicable coding and scoring methodology. University of North Dakota MA thesis. Parks' thesis
- Priedite, Aija. Surveying Languages and Attitudes and Practices in Latvia. Journal of Multilingual and Multicultural Development 26, no. 5, pp. 409-424.
- Radloff, Carla F. 1991. Sentence repetition testing for studies of community bilingualism. Summer Institute of Linguistics and the University of Texas at Arlington Publications in Linguistics, 104. Dallas: Summer Institute of Linguistics and the University of Texas at Arlington.
- Travis, Catherine E., and Rena Torres Cacoullos. "BEYOND QUESTIONNAIRES: COMMUNITY-BASED MEASURES OF BILINGUALISM." International journal of the Linguistic Association of the Southwest 34, no. 1-2 (2015): 105-128.
- Woodward, James. 1991. Sign language varieties in Costa Rica. Sign Language Studies Special Extra Length Issue: "Papers on Sign Languages & Deaf Cultures" 73:329-346.
- Woodward, James. 1993. The relationship of sign language varieties in India, Pakistan, and Nepal. Sign Language Studies 78: 15-22.
- Woodward, James. 1996. Modern Standard Thai Sign Language, influence from ASL and its relationship to original Thai sign varieties. Sign Language Studies 92: 227-252.
- Yoder, Zachariah. 2017. "The reliability of recorded text test scores: widespread inconsistent intelligibility testing in minority languages." Journal of Multilingual and Multicultural Development 38, no. 9: 843-855.
