= Contextualization (sociolinguistics) =

Use of language to signal relevant aspects of an interaction or situation

Contextualization in sociolinguistics refers to the use of language (both spoken language and body language) to signal relevant aspects of an interaction or communicative situation. This may include clues to who is talking, their relationship, where the conversation is occurring, and much more. These clues can be drawn from how the language is being used, what type of language is being used (formal versus informal), and the participants tone of voice (Andersen and Risør 2014). Contextualization includes verbal and non-verbal clues of things such as the power dynamic or the situation apparent from a conversation being analyzed or participated in. These clues are referred to as "contextualization cues". Contextualization cues are both verbal and non-verbal signs that language speakers use and language listeners hear that give clues into relationships, the situation, and the environment of the conversation (Ishida 2006). An example of contextualization in academia is the work of Basil Bernstein (1990 [1971]). Bernstein describes the contextualization of scientific knowledge in pedagogical contexts, such as textbooks.

Contextualization in relation to sociolinguistics only examines how language is being used. This is because sociolinguistics is the study of how society uses language.

== Contextualization cues ==
As previously mentioned, contextualization cues are crucial in that they are the clues that allow observers to better understand the interaction being presented. Some contextualization cues include: intonation, accents, body language, type of language, and facial expressions (Andersen and Risør 2014). Intonation refers to the rise and fall of speech. By observing this, excitement, anger, interest, or other emotions can be determined. Accents indicate a person's place of origin, so in a conversation this can give clues to not only where a person is from but also the values or cultural beliefs. Furthermore, when body language and facial expressions are combined, more clues about the relationship of the speaker, their feelings towards the topic or other participant, or emotions become evident (Ducharme and Bernard 2001). Finally, whether a person uses formal or informal language, allows the relationship between the two speakers to be clear. Most likely, when an interaction between two people who are peers and/or familiar with one another will utilize the informal form of language. The reverse is true for people unfamiliar with each other or those in an unequal power dynamic (Masuda 2016).

== Impact of contextualization ==
Contextualization has the overarching benefit of granting people the ability to understand. Zana Mahmood Hassan details the usefulness of contextualization in his paper, "Language Contextualization and Culture." Contextualization in sociolinguistics can allow those learning a language to begin to understand the culture by the cues found in the nuances of the language (Hassan 2014). Generalized, Hassan's findings reveal that language and context go hand in hand. Scholars have said that it is important to include culture studies into language studies because it aids in students' learning. The informational and situational context that culture provides helps language "make sense"; culture is a contextualization cue (Hassan 2014). In all, contextualization, when implemented properly, can make learning a language easier. Ducharme and Bernard make a similar argument in their article. They say that when students are given the tools and space to utilize contextualization, they are better able to learn a second language (Ducharme and Bernard 2001). Contextualization does not only ease everyday understand of language and language interactions, but it also aids in language learning and comprehension in an academic setting. Contextualization takes language just one step further by proving the intricacies of language and by filling in the gaps.

== Examples of contextualization in use ==
=== Example one: John Gumperz ===
John Gumperz (1982a) gives the following example. He suggests that in the following interaction the linguistic style used by the interviewer signals a context different from that expected by the husband. The interviewer, an African-American graduate student in educational psychology, has been sent to interview a woman at her home in a low-income neighborhood. The interviewer rings the door bell and the woman's husband opens the door.

Husband: So y're gonna check out ma old lady, hah?
Interviewer: Ah, no. I only came to get some information. They called from the office.

The husband addresses the interviewer in an informal style, marking their interaction as friendly. When the interviewer responds in a more formal style, the context becomes more formal. As a result, the interviewer reports that the interview was "stiff" (Gumperz 1982a: 133).

=== Example two: Kyoko Masuda ===
Kyoko Masuda provides another example from a study of conversations between female professors and students in Japan. She found that while students consistently used formal forms of Japanese when talking to professors, professors would often switch between the formal and informal forms depending on the topic of conversation (Masuda 2016). In this example, a student and professor are discussing the cultural difference in education between America and Japan:

Student A: Because in Japan, they absolutely can't do that, we (teachers) must teach them, don't we?
Professor A: I (definitely) think so, you know.
Student A: What else? (American students) do things like eating food and putting their feet on the desk. I don't understand well whether that sort of thing is part of their culture.
Professor A: After all, do you mind (their behavior)?
Student A: I do mind. (Masuda 2016)

In this interaction, the cues received by the student's style of speaking suggests that they are speaking to an authority figure, because they are deferring through the use of questions. Furthermore, you can see the formality in their language throughout the brief interaction. The student speaks in elongated sentences, saying things such as "I don't understand well" rather than just the informal "I don't get it." In examining the professor's use of language, they switch between the informal form ("I (definitely) think so, you know.") and the formal form ("After all, do you mind (their behavior)?"). This suggests that the professor used cues to learn that the student would prefer to remain in the formal form, and molded their language style to fit that. The reverse is seen within the next example:

Student B: When students (in Section A) know the answer, they immediately respond.
Professor B: Yeah, because they have confidence after all, don't they?
Student B: Yeah. Students in Section B are really slow, you know. (Masuda 2016)

After listening to the professor speak and seeing the professor utilize the informal form, the student shifted their style of speaking. Student B began by using the formal form, but ended with the informal form after examining the cues presented.
