= Style (sociolinguistics) =

Set of linguistic variants with specific social meanings

In sociolinguistics, a style is a set of linguistic variants with specific social meanings. In this context, social meanings can include group membership, personal attributes, or beliefs. Linguistic variation is at the heart of the concept of linguistic style—without variation, there is no basis for distinguishing social meanings. Variation can occur syntactically, lexically, and phonologically.

Many approaches to interpreting and defining style incorporate the concepts of indexicality, indexical order, stance-taking, and linguistic ideology. A style is not a fixed attribute of a speaker. Rather, a speaker may use different styles depending on context. Additionally, speakers often incorporate elements of multiple styles into their speech, either consciously or subconsciously, thereby creating a new style.

== Origins ==
William Labov first introduced the concept of style in the context of sociolinguistics in the 1960s, though he did not explicitly define the term. Labov primarily studied individual linguistic variables, and how they were associated with various social groups (e.g. social classes). He summed up his ideas about style in five principles:

"There are no single style speakers."
Style-shifting occurs in all speakers to a different degree; interlocutors regularly and consistently change their linguistic forms according to context.
"Styles can be ranged along a single dimension, measured by the amount of attention paid to speech."
Style-shifting correlates strongly with the amount of attention paid to speech. According to studies conducted by Labov, this was one of the single most important factors that determined whether or not an interlocutor would make a style-shift.
"The vernacular, in which the minimum attention is paid to speech, provides the most systematic data for linguistic analysis."
Labov characterized the vernacular as the original base mode of speech, learned at a very young age, on which more complex styles build later in life. This "basic" style has the least variation, and provides the most general account of the style of a given group.
"Any systematic observation of a speaker defines a formal context where more than the minimum attention is paid to speech."
In other words, even formal face-to-face interviews severely limit a speaker's use of their vernacular style. An interlocutor's vernacular style is most likely displayed if they do not perceive outside observers, and are not paying immediate attention to their own speech.
"Face-to-face interviews are the only means of obtaining the volume and quality of recorded speech that is needed for quantitative analysis."
Quantitative analysis requires the kind of data that must be obtained in a very obvious, formal way.

Labov's work primarily attempted to linked linguistic variants as a function of formality (a proxy for attention to speech) to specific social groups. In his study of /r/-variation in New York Department stores, he observed that those with a lower social class are less likely to pronounce postvocalic [r] in words like fourth and floor, while those with a higher social class are more likely to pronounce postvocalic [r] in their less careful speech. However, once forced to pay attention to language, they style-shift in a way indicative of their social aspirations. That is, those with a middle social class often alter their pronunciation of /r/ in a way that is generally indicative of a higher social standing, while those with a lower or higher social class more or less maintain their original pronunciation (presumably because they were either happy with their current position in the social hierarchy or resigned to it).

== Modern approaches ==
=== Indexical order ===
Penny Eckert's characterization of style as related to indexicality marked the beginning of a new approach to linguistic style. She builds on Michael Silverstein's notion of indexical order: the notion that linguistic variables index a social group, which by association leads to the indexing of certain traits stereotypically associated with members of that group. For example, in New York in the 1960s, a study by Labov showed that the clear articulation of postvocalic [r] in words like "fourth" and "floor" indexed a higher class (in New York), whereas the absence of postvocalic [r] indexed a lower class. However, the presence of lack of postvocalic [r] can also function as a higher order indexical that points indirectly to traits stereotypically associated with members of the upper or lower class. In this way, not articulating the [r] in the word "fourth" could index, for example, a lack of education (the trait) in addition to a lower social class (the group). According to this theory, any linguistic variable has its own indexical field spanning any number of potential meanings; the meanings actually associated with the variable are determined by social context and the style in which the variable is being used. These indexical fields are fluid and often change depending on their usage in different contexts or in combination with other variables. This view of style revolves around variation, and interpretation of variation as a purely indexical system built from ideological connections.

=== Ideology ===
In Judith Irvine's conception of style she emphasizes the fact that a style is defined only within a social framework. A variant and the social meanings it indexes are not inherently linked, rather, the social meanings exist as ideologically mediated interpretations made by members of the social framework. She highlights the fact that social meanings such as group membership mean nothing without an ideology to interpret them.

Mary Bucholtz's approach to style also relies heavily on ideology. She defines style as "a unidimensional continuum between vernacular and standard that varies based on the degree of speaker self-monitoring in a given speech context". This continuum depends on the ideology of the speaker, for they self-monitor depending on their ideologies concerning particular words. Bucholtz explains the ideology of gendered slang, in particular, the Mexican slang for "dude", guey. Guey indexes a stance of cool solidarity, and indirectly, [masculinity]. Ochs's framework for stance dictates that stances are ideologically connected with social groups. Bucholtz argues that ideology connects the stylistic feature of using guey with particular groups of people based on age, gender (male), and race. She also defines the concept of stylization as a set of deviations from the style one would expect from a situation according to the ideology of the style and how it matches up to the situation at hand. This leads to the indexing of groups with which the style is associated, and thus simplifies the indexical field at hand.

=== Stance-taking ===
Other theories on style often incorporate the role of stance-taking. These theories maintain that style is best viewed as consisting of smaller, more variable units known as stances. In this view, a stance is essentially a form of contextualization; it indicates the position of an interlocutor with respect to a particular utterance, conversation or other interlocutors. An interlocutor's use of language could imply, for instance, that they feel a certain way about an issue at hand, or that they do not care for the subject, or the people around them; these positions with respect to the context are different stances.

According to stance theory, a given interlocutor uses certain variations among linguistic variables to take a stance or stances in an interaction. The set of stances interlocutors tend to repeat or use the most often in certain contexts (or in general) comprise their style.

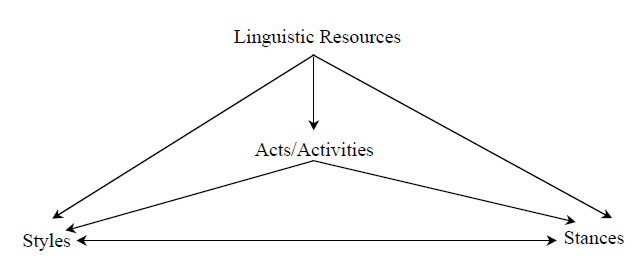
Robert Podesva's depiction of the indexical relationships between linguistic resources, acts or activities, stance and style.

This approach focuses more on interaction and reaction in a linguistic context, rather than a static identity or social group. Linguistic variables do not index specific social groups by themselves, but instead combine with other linguistic variables to index various stances and styles, which are in turn associated with social groups. Kiesling writes:

In this view, personal styles are composed of a set, or repertoire, of stances, and a way of speaking represents not simply a personal style but a stance that a person tends to adopt repeatedly over time ... Because some stances are more favored by one group than another, this gives the appearance that a linguistic item directly indexes ... that group, where in actuality it also, or primarily, indexes a stance …

In this model of linguistic variation, stances are an important middle step between linguistic variables and a style or characteristic social group.

== Emergence of new styles ==
=== Performative creation of new styles ===
The performative creation of style is the result of a desire to project a certain social image or stance. Interlocutors who wish to present in a certain manner may consciously alter their linguistic style to affect how they appear to others. An example of this performative style is exemplified by non-linguistic situations. In one study, Eckert interviewed several female students at Palo Alto High School in California. "New-wave" teens who wished to be distinctive adapted a more rebellious fashion style, wearing mostly dark clothes and pegged jeans, whereas popular, "preppy" girls tended towards light pastel colors and straight designer jeans. However, a couple girls wished to portray themselves as unique without losing their popular conformist social identity. The table below compares resulting styles:

	eye makeup	general color scheme	pants
"New-wave" girls	dark/black	black	black, pegged
"Preppy" girls	light/none	pastels	blue designer straight-cut
"Preppy but unique" girls	light/none	pastels	blue, pegged

As Eckert demonstrates, the "preppy" girls who wished to maintain a slightly distinctive style combined certain aspects of the "preppy" style with the "new-wave" style. They maintained their color choices and shied away from dark eye-makeup—but wore blue pegged jeans instead of the standard designer jeans of their group. This is because they perceive that the eye makeup indexes an "adult" or "slutty" characteristic, while the all-black color scheme is "scary".

In the same way, interlocutors often choose to performatively create their own linguistic style to suit the self-image they desire. In a case study conducted by Podesva, he studies the style of a gay lawyer, who combines certain aspects of common professional and gay linguistic features to create his own style, indexing both a "professional lawyer" characteristic and a unique "gay" characteristic with his speech.

=== Nonperformative emergence of new styles ===
Styles are not necessarily consciously created; there are a number of processes that contribute to the construction of meaning for both individual speech variants and styles. Individual variants can be adopted by multiple styles. When a variant is newly adopted by a style, it changes both the perception of the variant and the perception of the style. In the Eckertian view, a person's linguistic style identifies their position in an indexical field of social meanings. These social meanings are created by a continual analysis and interpretation of the linguistic variants that are observed based on who uses them.

== Style-shifting ==
Style shifting refers to a single speaker changing style in response to context. As noted by Eckert and Rickford, in sociolinguistic literature terms style and register sometimes have been used interchangeably. Also, various connotations of style are a subject of study in stylistics.

Style-shifting is a manifestation of intraspeaker (within-speaker) variation, in contrast with interspeaker (between-speakers) variation. It is a voluntary act which an individual effects in order to respond to or initiate changes in sociolinguistic situation (e.g., interlocutor-related, setting-related, topic-related).

William Labov, while conducting sociolinguistic interviews, designated two types of spoken style, casual and formal, and three types of reading style (a reading passage, a word list, and a minimal pair list). Analysing style-shifting Labov postulated that "styles can be arranged along a single dimension, measured by the amount of attention paid to speech" (1972, as quoted in), casual style requiring the least amount of conscious self-monitoring. Such style-shifting is often referred to as responsive (produced in response to normative pressures).

In recent developments of stylistic variation analysis, scholars such as Allan Bell, Barbara Johnstone, and Natalie Schilling-Estes have been focusing on the initiative dimension of style-shifting, which occurs when speakers proactively choose between various linguistic resources (e.g. dialectal, archaic or vernacular forms) in order to present themselves in a specific way. In initiative style-shifting, speakers actively engage in social practices to construct social meaning.

There have been a large number of suggested motivations for this phenomenon:

Attention to speech model
In the attention to speech model it is proposed that the style a speaker uses is dependent on how much attention the speaker is paying to their own speech, which in turn is dependent on the formality of the situation. Additionally, each speaker has one most natural style, which is defined as the style the speaker uses when paying the least attention (i.e. in the most casual situations). Criticisms of this model include that it is difficult to quantify attention paid to speech and the model suggests that a speaker has only one style for a given level of formality.

Communication accommodation theory
Communication accommodation theory (CAT) seeks to explain style-shifting in terms of two processes: convergence, in which the speaker attempts to shift their speech to match that of the interlocuter to gain social approval, and divergence, in which the speaker attempts to distance themselves from the interlocuter by shifting their speech away from that of the interlocuter. Two specific shortcomings of this basic form of CAT include its inability to explain situations in which convergence occurs when the motivation is clearly not social approval (e.g. in arguments) and the fact that non-convergent speech is often used to maintain social distance in asymmetric relationships (e.g. employer-employee).

Audience design model
The audience design model is very similar to communication accommodation theory with an added component: the audience design model proposes the existence of nonpresent reference groups, with which a speaker may converge or diverge. In this theory, speakers constantly negotiating their relationship, not only with the audience, but also with other nonpresent people or groups that come up in the discourse.

Style-shifting as an act of identity
This theory proposes that speakers shape their speech to associate or disassociate themselves with specific social groups. It further proposes that a speaker does not have an underlying fundamental style which they use in casual speech, but rather all styles are equally fundamental.

Footing and framing model
A footing is a role that a speaker occupies and may be described as follows:

[Footings] may change many times during the course of a single interaction, and speakers often balance a number of roles simultaneously, since footing exist on a number of different levels, from the personal interactional (e.g. the role of "friend") to the institutional (e.g. "CEO of a corporation") to the sociocultural (e.g. "Native American male").

By style shifting speakers are able to cast themselves in different footings. Also central to this model is the frame of the discourse, which is the feeling of the interactants about what kind of interaction is occurring (e.g. formal interview, casual conversation, political discussion). Different frames are being continuously foregrounded and backgrounded relative to one another throughout the discourse. The footings that speakers adopt through style-shifting are dependent on which frames are most prominent at any given time.

== Style matching ==
Style matching is defined as the matching of behaviors between a speaker and an interlocutor. The premise of the theory is that individuals have the ability to strategically negotiate the social distance between themselves and their interaction partners. This can be done linguistically, paralinguistically, and non-verbally, for example, by varying speech style, rate, pitch, and gaze.

One theory behind linguistic style matching suggests that the words one speaker uses prime the listener to respond in a specific way. In this fashion, an interlocutor is influenced by her partner's language at the word level in natural conversation in the same way that one's non-verbal behavior can be influenced by another's movement.

Additionally, Kate G. Niederhoffer proposes a coordination-engagement hypothesis, which suggests that the degree of engagement should be predictive of both linguistic and nonverbal coordination. There exists an interactional complexity whereby people can converge on some communicative features to meet social needs but diverge on others for identity management. For example, one can diverge in accent but converge in lexical diversity.

Individuals in two-person interactions exhibit linguistic style matching on both the conversational level and on a turn-by-turn level. This coordinated use of language occurs at a remarkably basic level (e.g., classes of words) and appears to occur independently of the perceived quality of an interaction, the length of the interaction, whether the interaction is face-to-face or on an Internet-like chat, etc. Socially, two people appear to fall into this coordinated way of interacting almost immediately even if they have never spoken to one another before. The listener is influenced by many linguistic primes set up by the speaker. All of this occurs on an unconscious level and is sensitive to the power differential between the participants, with less dominant participants generally being more attentive to more dominant participants’ words.

== Case studies ==
=== Urban styles ===
An opposition between urban and suburban linguistic variables is common to all metropolitan regions of the United States. Although the particular variables distinguishing urban and suburban styles may differ from place to place, the trend is for urban styles to lead in the use of nonstandard forms and negative concord. In Penny Eckert's study of Belten High in the Detroit suburbs, she noted a stylistic difference between two groups that she identified: school-oriented jocks and urban-oriented, school-alienated burnouts. The variables she analyzed were the usage of negative concord and the mid and low vowels involved in the Northern Cities Shift, which consists of the following changes: æ > ea, a > æ, ə > a, ʌ > ə, ay > oy, and ɛ > ʌ ([y] here is equivalent to the IPA symbol [j]). All of these changes are urban-led, as is the use of negative concord. The older, mostly stabilized changes, æ > ea, a > æ, and ə > a, were used the most by women, while the newer changes, ʌ > ə, ay > oy, and ɛ > ʌ were used the most by burnouts. Eckert theorizes that by using an urban variant such as [foyt], they were not associating themselves with urban youth. Rather, they were trying to index traits that were associated with urban youth, such as "tough" and "street-smart".

This theory is further supported by evidence from a subgroup within the burnout girls, which Eckert refers to as ‘burned-out’ burnout girls. She characterizes this group as being even more anti-establishment than the ‘regular’ burnout girls. This subgroup led overall in the use of negative concord as well as in female-led changes. This is unusual because negative concord is generally used the most by males. ‘Burned-out’ burnout girls were not indexing masculinity — this is shown by their use of female-led variants and the fact that they were found to express femininity in non-linguistic ways. This shows that linguistic variables may have different meanings in the context of different styles.

=== Gay styles ===
There is some debate about what makes a style "gay." In stereotypically flamboyant gay speech, the phonemes /s/ and /l/ have a greater duration. People are also more likely to identify those with higher frequency ranges as gay.

On the other hand, there are many different styles represented within the gay community. There is much linguistic variation in the gay community, and each subculture appears to have its own distinct features. According to Podesva et al., "gay culture encompasses reified categories such as leather daddies, clones, drag queens, circuit boys, guppies (gay yuppies), gay prostitutes, and activists both mainstream and radical, as well as more local communities of practice which may not even have names." Thus, each of these sub-cultures speaks with a different style than all the other sub-cultures.

There are also many features that are fairly prevalent in all of society but can index homosexuality in particular contexts. "Cooperative discourse" is often considered a feature of gay linguistic style, but is also used by some straight men, as well as by women. This is in line with an approach to style that emphasizes stance.

Podesva et al. performed a study describing a sub-style within gay culture that some gay activists, lawyers, or other professionals use. The gay lawyer in their study does not want to appear "too gay," lest he also convey frivolity or other characteristics that he deemed unprofessional. It was important to him that he appear rational, educated, and competent as a lawyer. This is in line with the audience approach to style in which styles receive their meaning as a result of their opposition to other styles in their social sphere (in this case other gay styles). The lawyer's high release of word final stops, a variable also often found in the language of geek-girls and Orthodox Jews, indexes a desire to appear educated and not "too gay." This actually indexes his gay identity because he is tailoring his gay style (or lack thereof).

== See also ==
- Allan Bell
- Audience design
- Code-switching
- Indexicality
- Register (sociolinguistics)
- Sociolinguistics
- Sociolinguistic interview
- Style (manner of address)
- Stylistics
- Variation (linguistics)
- William Labov
- Writing style
