= Religiolect =

Language variety of a religious community

A religiolect is the language variety belonging to a specific religious or secularized community with its own history and development. Coined by Professor of Hebrew and Judaic Studies Benjamin Hary in his 1992 book Multiglossia in Judeo-Arabic, the term was originally applied to the Jewish linguistic spectrum, but has been expanded to other religious contexts. In contrast to an ethnolect, which marks its speakers as members of a shared ethnic group, a religiolect does not involve ethnic background but rather religious background.

Religiolects have been studied in the context of a number of religious communities: Judaism, Islam, Christianity (Christianese), the Christian Haugean movement, The Church of Jesus Christ of Latter-day Saints (Mormonese), Islamic and Christian communities in post-Soviet Russia, Baháʼí, Buddhism, and others.

== See also ==
- Sacred language
- Shibboleth
- Sociolect
- Speech community
- Sprechbund
