= John J. Gumperz =

American linguist (1922–2013)

John Joseph Gumperz (January 9, 1922 – March 29, 2013) was an American linguist and academic. Gumperz was, for most of his career, a professor at the University of California, Berkeley. His research on the languages of India, on code-switching in Norway, and on conversational interaction, has benefitted the study of sociolinguistics, discourse analysis, linguistic anthropology, and urban anthropology.

== Career and work ==
Gumperz was born Hans-Josef Gumperz in Hattingen, Germany. A Jew, he fled Nazi Germany and settled first in Italy, then the Netherlands, and finally in the United States in 1939. Originally interested in chemistry, he became fascinated by language. At the University of Michigan he wrote a dissertation entitled The Swabian Dialect of Washtenaw County, Michigan under the direction of Herbert Penzl and earned a Ph.D. in 1954. In 1956 Gumperz joined the faculty at the University of California, Berkeley.

There, he developed a new way of looking at sociolinguistics with Dell Hymes, also a scholar of sociolinguistics. Their contribution was a new method called the "ethnography of communication." Gumperz's own approach has been called interactional sociolinguistics.

Sociolinguistics analyzes variation in discourse within a particular speech community, and it studies how that variation affects the unfolding of meaning in interaction and correlates with the social order of the community.

Gumperz built on Hymes's work by looking at differential power between speech communities. In particular, Gumperz noted that the "standard" form of any given language (the form that is expected in formal situations, such as on the news) is the dialect of those who are already powerful. He called that the "prestige dialect," and he noted that those who did not speak that dialect natively but instead a stigmatized or less powerful native dialect were "diglossic" (they were fluent in their native dialects and also able to use the prestige dialect). However, those whose native dialect was the prestige dialect were rarely able to use other codes.

Gumperz defines the speech community as "any human aggregate characterized by regular and frequent interaction by means of a shared body of verbal signs and set off from similar aggregates by significant differences in language usage."

Gumperz was interested in how the order of situations and the culture of the interlocutors both affect how interlocutors make conversational inferences and interpret verbal or non-verbal signs, which he called contextualization cues (overlapping terms by other scholars include paralanguage and kinesics).

His publications and courses given include work in the emerging field of sociolinguistics research in India.

== See also ==
- Dell Hymes
- Paralanguage
