= SPEAKING =

Model socio-linguistic study

In sociolinguistics, SPEAKING or the SPEAKING model, is a model socio-linguistic study (represented as a mnemonic) developed by Dell Hymes. Hymes developed this model as part of a new methodology referred to as the ethnography of speaking. This model is a tool to assist the identification and labeling of components of interactional linguistics that was driven by his view that, in order to speak a language correctly, one needs not only to learn its vocabulary and grammar, but also the context in which words are used. In essence, learning the components of the SPEAKING model is essential for linguistic competence.

To facilitate the application of his representation, Hymes constructed the mnemonic, S-P-E-A-K-I-N-G (for setting and scene, participants, ends, acts sequence, key, instrumentalities, norms, & genre) under which he grouped the sixteen components within eight divisions.

The model has sixteen components that can be applied to many sorts of discourse: message form; message content; setting; scene; speaker/sender; addressor; hearer/receiver/audience; addressee; purposes (outcomes); purposes (goals); key; channels; forms of speech; norms of interaction; norms of interpretation; and genres. The SPEAKING model is used by linguistic anthropologists to analyze speech events (one or more speech acts involving one or more participants) as part of an ethnographies. This approach can be used to understand relationships and power dynamics within a given speech community and provide insight on cultural values.

== Divisions ==
=== Setting and scene ===
"Setting refers to the time and place of a speech act and, in general, to the physical circumstances". The living room in the grandparents' home might be a setting for a family story. Scene is the "psychological setting" or "cultural definition" of a scene, including characteristics such as range of formality and sense of play or seriousness. The family story may be told at a reunion celebrating the grandparents' anniversary. At times, the family would be festive and playful; at other times, serious and commemorative.

Setting and scene also refer to the implicit rules and expectations surrounding the speech event. The setting of the speech event determines who should speak and who should not, what type of speech is appropriate (see also code-switching), and when interrupting is acceptable. For example, speech events in the classroom have particular implicit rules for the speaking teachers and listening students, certain words are not viewed as appropriate in the classroom, and interrupting is often met with consequences. Conversely, different implicit rules and expectations apply at social gatherings and work settings.

The setting of the speech event also refers to the location of participants and any physical barriers that may be present. For instance, whether participants are facing one another, what body language they are exhibiting, and whether or not they are separated by a table, chairs, or space in the room. Documentation of the physical setting is especially useful for completing an ethnography of a given community.

=== Participants ===
Participants include the speaker and the audience. Linguistic anthropologists will make distinctions within these categories. The audience may include those to whom the speech act is directed, and those who are not addressed but overhear. For example, at the family reunion, an aunt might tell a story to the young female relatives, but males, although not addressed, might also hear the narrative.

When considering the participants in a speech event, one should consider the implicit and explicit rules about who is, can, and should be involved; what expectations are established for the participants; who is speaking and who is being addressed. Certain ideologies are at play regarding participants in speech events. For example, cultural norms about how children should speak to adults, how women should speak around men, or how employees should speak to their boss. Each participant in a speech event is operating with specific rules and expectations, which are important for linguistic competence.

=== Ends ===
The ends of a speech event are its purposes, goals, and outcomes. The aunt may tell a story about the grandmother to entertain the audience, teach the young women, and honor the grandmother. Additionally, the ends of a speech event may differ for those participating. Harriet Joseph Ottenheimer provides an example of a tourist seeking directions and a New Yorker providing vague answers, "your goal may be to get information and get to your destination, but their goal is to appear knowledgeable." Differences in the ends of speech events can happen often, especially in classrooms and workplaces. Similarities and differences in the ends of speech events are important for successful communication and acceptance of an individual into a culture or a speech community.

=== Act sequence ===
Act sequence refers to the sequence of speech acts that make up a speech event. The order of speech acts greatly influences the speech event. The initial speech acts set the tone for the conversation. Beginning a lecture by saying, "Ladies and gentlemen ...", sets a different tone than by saying, "Hello! How is everyone today?"

The act sequence of an event also orients the participants to social cues. Important aspects of an act sequence include turn-taking and interrupting. For example, an aunt's story might begin as a response to a toast to the grandmother; the story's plot and development would have a sequence structured by the aunt. Possibly, there might be a collaborative interruption during the telling. Finally, the group might applaud the tale and move onto another subject or activity.

=== Key ===
"Key" refers to the clues that establish the "tone, manner, or spirit" of the speech act. The aunt might imitate the grandmother's voice and gestures in a playful way, or she might address the group in a serious voice, emphasizing the sincerity and respect of the praise the story expresses. Generally, different keys are used in different situations. For instance, different tones are used at birthday parties and funerals. Intonation in sentences can provide additional meaning; lighter tones communicate humor and friendship, while monotone speech acts communicate seriousness or a lack of cacaemotion. Similarly, keys can be formal or informal, and can be influenced by word choice. Informal keys include the use of contractions (can't, as opposed to cannot), use of slang or profanity, condensed or loose pronunciations (gonna), missing infinitives ("the kids need bathed" versus "the kids need to be bathed"), and prepositional endings ("What did you do that for?"). Overall, the key of the speech act adds a human element to communication and provides valuable information for informing social norms and expectations for the speech event. Proper application of the appropriate key in a speech event is vital for linguistic competence.

=== Instrumentalities ===
Instrumentalities are the channels used to complete the speech act. These include the method of communication (writing, speaking, signing or signaling), the language, dialect (a mutually intelligible subset of a language) and register (a variety of a language that is used in specific settings). Hymes described these instrumentalities generally as the Forms and styles of speech. For example, the instrumentality of the spoken word is different from the written word; the language spoken is unique to the speech act, as is the dialect. Similarly, the register that is used influences the speech event. For example, an aunt might speak in a casual register with many dialect features, but if her niece continues the conversation in a more formal register with standard grammatical forms, the conversation may seem awkward.

=== Norms ===
Norms are the social rules governing the speech event and the participants' actions and reactions. In a playful story by the aunt, the norms may allow many audience interruptions and collaboration; and, possibly, those interruptions may be limited to participation by older females. A serious, formal story by the aunt might call for attention to her and no interruptions as norms.

Norms will vary for each speech community. Examples of questions regarding established norms include:

- When is it okay to speak?
- Who should listen?
- When is silence preferred?
- How loud is too loud?
- What speed should be used in the conversation?
- What topics are acceptable?

=== Genre ===
Genre is the kind of speech act or event; for the example used here, the kind of story. The aunt might tell a character anecdote about the grandmother for entertainment, or an exemplum as moral instruction. Different disciplines develop terms for kinds of speech acts, and speech communities sometimes have their own terms for types. Other examples of speech genres include gossip, jokes, and conversations.

== Rich points ==
Rich points are instances where there is a disconnect between two speakers in a speech event resulting from differences in perceived implicit rules and expectations. These instances represent a conflict in the SPEAKING model between two people. This difference and the negotiation to reestablish the conversation is referred to as MAR (mistake, awareness, repair).

=== Mistake ===
Mistakes in conversation occur when participants in the conversation are operating with different implicit rules and expectations for the SPEAKING model. Mistakes often result from disagreements about inclusion of participants, mismatched ends, unexpected act sequences, keys or instrumentalities. In general mistakes and conflicts arise when there is a deviation in the conversation from the norm. In some genres, such as gossip, rapid turn-taking and interrupting is not only accepted, but expected. If one participant is not active in this type of speech, they may come across as ambivalent to the conversation—this would be an example of a mistake.

=== Awareness ===
Awareness occurs when one or more of the participants recognizes the differences in expectations for the conversation. In some cases, this may mean that one speaker recognizes that the other is speaking faster or slower, using act sequences that rely heavily on fast turn-taking or accepted interrupting, speaking in a more formal or informal register, etc. In the instance of gossip, it would be important to recognize if one is not matching the speech pattern.

=== Repair ===
Repair of the conversation occurs when one or more participants in the speech event change one or more of the SPEAKING components in order to ameliorate the mistake. For example, this may mean that the speaker increases the speed of their speech or participates in rapid turn-taking and interrupting. When repair does not occur the speech event can seem awkward. However, when one learns to repair speech events, the individual can more readily connect with participants in the speech event and establish rapport. Speaking through by maintaining grammatical rules for correct understanding.

== Applications ==
=== Standard (Linguistic) ===
The SPEAKING model has been applied to understand a variety of communities and situations. Speech events are key to the foundation of culture and have been the subject of much analysis. Many people have applied the SPEAKING model to understand conversations in unique populations and settings, to better understand the interplay between culture and language, and to analyze status, power and inequality.

=== Non-standard ===
In the rise of a variety of Enterprise Resource Planning (ERP) and other software (such as Microsoft Dynamics 365 Business Central (D365BC)), the SPEAKING model has been relied upon to build a framework for the analysis of computer programs to help companies and individuals choose the best option that suits their needs.
