= Information gap =

Information gap may refer to:

- Information gap task, a technique used in language teaching
- Info-gap decision theory, a type of decision theory in economics
