= Nacirema =

Satirical anthropological look at American society

Nacirema ("American" spelled backwards) is a term used in anthropology and sociology in relation to aspects of the behavior and society of citizens of the United States. The neologism attempts to create a deliberate sense of self-distancing in order that American anthropologists might look at their own culture more objectively, thus comparing emic and etic views of it.

== "Body Ritual among the Nacirema" ==
The original use of the term in a social science context was in "Body Ritual among the Nacirema", which satirizes anthropological papers on "other" cultures, and the culture of the United States. Horace Mitchell Miner wrote the paper and originally published it in Volume 58, Issue 3 of American Anthropologist issued June 1956.

In the paper, Miner describes the Nacirema, a little-known tribe living in North America. The way in which he writes about the curious practices that this group performs distances readers from the fact that the North American group described actually corresponds to modern-day Americans of the mid-1950s.

Miner presents the Nacirema as a group living in the territory between the Canadian Cree, the Yaqui and Tarahumare of Mexico, and the Carib and Arawak of the Antilles. The paper describes the typical Western ideal for oral cleanliness, as well as providing an outside view on hospital care and on psychiatry. The Nacirema are described as having a highly developed market economy that has evolved within a rich natural habitat.

Miner's article became a popular work, reprinted in many introductory textbooks and used as an example of process analysis in the literature text The Bedford Reader. The article received the most reprint permission requests of any article in American Anthropologist.

Some of the popular aspects of Nacirema culture include: medicine men and women (doctors, psychiatrists, and pharmacists), a charm-box (medicine cabinet), the mouth-rite ritual (brushing teeth), and a cultural hero known as Notgnihsaw (Washington spelled backwards). These ritual purification practices are prescribed as how humans should comport themselves in the presence of sacred things. These sacred aspects are the rituals that the Nacirema partake in throughout their lives.

== "The mysterious fall of the Nacirema" ==
In 1972, Neil B. Thompson revisited the Nacirema after the fall of their civilization. Thompson's paper, unlike Miner's, primarily offered a social commentary focused on environmental issues. Thompson paid special attention to the Elibomotua (automobile backwards) cult and its efforts to modify the environment.

The high esteem of the cult is demonstrated by the fact that near every population center, when not disturbed by the accumulation of debris, archaeologists have found large and orderly collections of the Elibomotua cult symbol. The vast number of these collections has given us the opportunity to reconstruct with considerable confidence the principal ideas of the cult. The newest symbols seem to have nearly approached the ultimate of the Nacirema's cultural ideal. Their colors, material, and size suggest an enclosed mobile device that corresponds to no color or shape found in nature, although some authorities suggest that, at some early time in the development, the egg may have been the model. The device was provided with its own climate control system as well as a system that screened out many of the shorter rays of the light spectrum.

This article is reprinted and appears as the final chapter in an anthology, Nacirema: Readings on American Culture. The volume contains an array of scholarly investigations into American social anthropology as well as one more article in the Nacirema series, by Willard Walker of Wesleyan University: "The Retention of Folk Linguistic Concepts and the ti'ycir (teacher) Caste in Contemporary Nacireman Culture" which laments the corrosive and subjugating ritual of attending sguwlz (schools). On phonology, the anthropologist notes:

The vowel system of Secular Nacireman consists of nine phonemically distinct vowels distinguished on the basis of three degrees of tongue height and three degrees of tongue advancement. ... There can be no question as to the validity of these nine vocalic phonemes, for each is attested by a number of minimal pairs elicited independently from several informants. Curiously enough, however, most informants insist that only five vowels exist in the language: these are called ˀey, ˀiy, ˀay, ˀow, and yuw, and are invariably cited in precisely that order. ... The discovery of the widespread myth of the five-vowel system prompted the present writer to conduct a series of intensive interviews and administer questionnaires to a sample of Nacireman informants with a view to mapping the general outlines of Nacireman folk linguistics. This research strategy ultimately provided compelling evidence that it is the ti'yčɨr caste that has disseminated the notion of the five-vowel system.

This refers to the traditional enumeration of the 5 vowel letters in the English alphabet (A, E, I, O, and U), which is in contrast to the much larger number (varying between accents) of distinct vowel sounds in the language (see English phonology § Vowels).

== Nacirema vs. Teamsterville ==
Gerry Philipsen (1992) studies what he terms "speech codes" among the Nacirema, which he contrasts with the speech codes of another semi-fictionalized group of Americans, the inhabitants of Teamsterville culture. His Nacirema comprises primarily middle-class west-coast Americans.

== See also ==
- Iracema – 1865 indigenous novel by José de Alencar, with a character named after the anagram of "America"
- Motel of the Mysteries (1979), an illustrated book by David Macaulay depicting burial customs of the "Yanks of East Usa"
