= Christianese =

Christian religious terminology and jargon

Christianese refers to the contained terms and jargon used within many of the branches and denominations of Christianity as a functional system of religious terminology or religiolect. It is characterized by the use in everyday conversation of certain words, theological terms, puns and catchphrases, in ways that may be only comprehensible within the context of a particular Christian sect or denomination. The terms used do not necessarily come from the Bible itself. They may have come into use through discussions about doctrine, through the social history of the Christian church at large, or in the unique history of a specific denomination or movement.

In the developed Christian context, particular terms like God and Christ (or Jesus) as well as more common terms such as faith, truth and spirit have a rich history of meaning to refer to concepts in spirituality, which Christians may consider to be particular to Christianity, and not available to dissimilar or distantly foreign belief systems. While particular terms may have some functional translatability to concepts in other systems, such translations may typically be controversial outside of the forum of comparative religion. Because terms interoperate in a closed system, Christians may consider the use of such terms outside of Christianity or their particular branch (or denomination) as a distortion.

The term Christianese is an informal and sometimes pejorative reference to the language of terms used in Christianity as contained and, in some cases, deliberately or effectively uncooperative with secular and foreign terms. Certain denominations – contemporary Pentecostalism and evangelicalism for example – may be more widely considered as users of distinctly localised variants of Christianese.

== Elements and use ==
In its basic form, Christianese uses theological and Biblical terms to describe matters of faith and everyday experiences as interpreted through a filter of faith and doctrine. Linda Coleman's 1980 research into Christianese notes three purposes: the ability to reinforce in-group belonging while remaining separate from outsiders; a sign to the member's degree of engagement in the worldview; and finally, its use to both display and apply the speaker's beliefs and Christian worldview, which she refers to as a worldviewlect. Christianese features "influences from the worldview appearing in nearly every area of language use." New Testament scholar and theologian Marcus Borg comments that Christianese is used by Christians "to connect their religion to their life in the world".

Like secret languages such as rhyming slang, evangelical Christianese relies on the hearer's ability to "reconstruct...the sequence of logical connections" to understand the meaning of an utterance. The words and phrases used are known to the speaker of the wider language (e. g. English); however, without an understanding of the passage of the Bible, issue of theology or (sometimes) specific doctrine at the forefront of the mind of the speaker, the listener may lack the context to understand what is being said. One example is the allusion to one's home as a "tent until I'm called home", referencing the biblical image of an "earthly tent" as a temporary living place before proceeding to one's eternal home. Likewise, words may be used with metaphorical meanings not immediately clear, such as "the Lord's Supper...still speaks to every circumcised ear" referring not to the physical rite of circumcision but rather the Christian hearer. Borg states, "Speaking Christian is an umbrella term for not only knowing the words, but understanding them... It's knowing the basic vocabulary, knowing the basic stories." An article published in Christianity Today comments that those unfamiliar with Christianese, lacking a reference point, may fill in the blanks with other cultural references – such as from pop culture – leading to misunderstanding.

Words like just may be used more often or in different ways than typical. One linguistic analysis of online evangelical sermons by the pastor of megachurch Lifechurch.tv found an excessive use of just in phrases like "Again, let me just put it as simply as I can...", often used in order to express sincerity. The study described it as "[seemingly] unique to evangelical Christian sermons and extemporaneous prayers among insiders"; the preacher's "myriad uses of just ... demonstrate his placement in the evangelical tradition." Terms such as Christ followers, as opposed to the more traditional Christians, emphasize new Christians "[allying] themselves with a person rather than converting to an institutionalized religion."

Megachurches and celebrity pastors have also been linked to the rise of modern Christianese by University of Sheffield linguist Valerie Hobbs, author of An Introduction to Religious Language: Exploring Theolinguistics in Contemporary Contexts. She contends that they use this language as a form of branding and discusses the overlap between Christian jargon and corporate jargon. Phrases like "making an impact" or "come on board with us" are common to both the Christian and corporate worlds. Hobbs argues that the jargon lends an appearance of authority: new terms are constantly being introduced by authoritative figures and one must understand, or pretend one understands, the meaning. In addition, there is pressure to use the correct jargon as a member of the group.

Archaic words and meanings may be used, or used in ways unfamiliar to modern speakers. Russian Orthodox Christians, for example, may use the archaic zhelaiu mnogaia i blagaia leta 'I wish you many and happy years', with its archaic terminology and grammatical features, rather than the modern zhelaiu mnogo schastlivykh let 'I wish you many happy years', stemming from Church Slavonic, the church's liturgical language.

Coleman states that passive voice and euphemisms may be used to emphasize God's action rather than one's own actions, due to the theological emphasis on depravity. "I/We ministered to them" may be considered unacceptable, in favor of "I was enabled to minister to him in some small way"; phrases such as "I feel/felt led to do X", rather than "I decided to do X", emphasize God as the agent. In connection with phrases such as "to have fellowship with [another Christian]", "the Evangelical avoids claiming to have performed a specific good action. In other words, 'have fellowship with' is a euphemism. It is, furthermore, a euphemism for something which most non-Evangelicals have no hesitancy about claiming responsibility for, since the broader culture would not perceive such a claim as an unwarranted boast."

Coleman wrote:

From what we have seen, then, it appears that a good deal of the Evangelical grammar, if we can call it that, seems designed to avoid reference to human beings as primary agents and to introduce God as the moving force behind all good actions. This is what we should expect, of course: the Evangelical needs to be able to talk about events in a way that members of the broader society generally do not, since the Evangelical is trying to reference two levels of reality which impinge on each other.

— Linda Coleman, The language of "Born-Again" Christianity

Others, however, have since argued for a more nuanced view of God as agent in Christianese, contending that a part of such language competence is to know when to refer to God actively or passively, which often occurs in different topic categories such as "action", "plan", or "blessing" vs. "belief", "surrender", or "conversion", respectively.

Words may also take on different functions in Christianese as part of functional shift, including the formation of the noun fellowshipping and the verb to disciple.

=== In politics ===
Christian terminology can be used to display in-group belonging: "[Christians] use coded Christian terms like verbal passports – flashing them gains you admittance to certain Christian communities." Historian of religion Bill J. Leonard states that for American politicians, speaking "Christian" is a necessity in order to win elections: politicians may use coded Christianese to appeal to voters. He notes that Abraham Lincoln was critiqued for not using enough "conversionistic" language.

While avoiding explicit references to Jesus or Christ, US President George W. Bush was known to use Christian figures of speech. In his 2003 State of the Union address, for example, he referred to the "wonder-working power – in the goodness, and idealism, and faith of the American people", a reference recognizable to many evangelical Christians from the hymn "There is Power in the Blood". Leonard argues this is coded language intended to appeal to Christian voters; Bush's speechwriter Michael Gerson, however, contends it is "our culture".

Cultural historian Paul S. Boyer described the evangelical Christian meaning behind examples of Bush's phrasing:

But when our born-again president [George W. Bush] describes the nation's foreign-policy objective in theological terms as a global struggle against "evildoers," and when, in his recent State of the Union address, he casts Saddam Hussein as a demonic, quasi-supernatural figure who could unleash "a day of horror like none we have ever known," he is not only playing upon our still-raw memories of 9/11. He is also invoking a powerful and ancient apocalyptic vocabulary that for millions of prophecy believers conveys a specific and thrilling message of an approaching end – not just of Saddam, but of human history as we know it.

While lacking fluency in Christianese at the time of his 2016 campaign, US President Donald Trump's use of Christianese, and Christian nationalist language, has increased significantly. In analyzing 448 presidential speeches from the time of Franklin D. Roosevelt to Trump, researcher Ceri Hughes has found that Trump's use of Christian terminology surpasses all other presidents studied, climbing dramatically after his first inauguration.

Religion scholar Elizabeth A. McAlister notes an increasing use of "evangelical tropes and cues" supporting American military activity along with increasing spiritual warfare imagery and militaristic rhetoric in evangelicalism; E. Janet Warren argues that the term spiritual warfare has lost its original sense – as an insightful new biblical metaphor – in modern evangelicalism.

=== In music ===
In the book Apostles of Rock: the Splintered World of Contemporary Christian Music, author Jay Howard comments on a move towards exhortational, "scripture lesson" themes in contemporary Christian music, in which Christianese became more common:

Lyrics were soon overflowing with phrases and references all but incomprehensible outside of an evangelical framework. With lines such as 'If you die before you die than [sic] when you die you won't die,' Benny Hester's 'If You Die Before You Die,' Kenny Mark's 'Soul Reviver', Dan Peek's 'Doer of the Word', Mylon LeFevre and Broken Heart's 'Love God, Hate Sin,' the Michael Card-penned Amy Grant hit 'El Shaddai,' and numerous others proved to be highly appealing affirmations to evangelicals while being largely unintelligible and/or terribly trite to non-Christians.

== Special lexicography ==
Various lists of Christianese terms and their definitions have been published, including in newspaper articles, blogs, and the defunct website Dictionary of Christianese.

== Critique ==
Christian jargon has been critiqued as clichéd; its potential to confuse or isolate others has also been critiqued in media, both explicitly Christian and otherwise.

The article "Unlearning 'Christianese'" in Canadian Mennonite makes the comparison to legalese, "which has its place and purpose, but is confusing and meaningless to people who aren't lawyers." The author addresses the perceived clichéd nature of Christianese and urges readers to use more thoughtfulness and clarity when discussing faith. An article in Relevant magazine listed several "Christianese relationship cliches" to avoid such as "I'm guarding my heart", stating, "People often use these phrases without really even knowing what it is they are trying to say." The editorial staff of Biola University's Chimes asks readers "How do you 'do life together?' What does 'praying a hedge of protection around one another' look like?", urging readers to reconsider Christianese as it "only alienates people outside of the Christian community and makes us seem like even more of a members-only culture."

One Southern Baptist writer has referred to Christianese as "insider jargon they use all the time, whether they know it or not. ... This language is like a liturgy for them, but they don't understand that other people don't get it". Christian writer Dean Merrill's book Damage Control: How to Stop Making Jesus Look Bad argues that "Christianese mystifies, overwhelms, antagonizes and manipulates those who don't hold similar beliefs." Bill J. Leonard argues that it can appear elitist and divisive – making the faith less accessible – which he compares to Jesus, who used stories that were understandable by the general public. Likewise, Christianese may be interpreted quite differently: a 2017 news article noted the difference between in-group and out-group understandings of the Christian usage of thoughts and prayers.

One Christian young adult novel features a non-Christian girl's attempts to understand the Christianese used by those around her.

== Research ==
Studies on Christianese as a phenomenon, though few, date back to 1980. Academic interest has increased as Christian religious identity is a growing area of study, with language use noted in multiple studies. Among other contexts, it has been studied among preachers and American presidents.

Vitaly Voinov has examined issues regarding translation of the Bible into Tuvan for the Tuvan people and the potential cultural impacts of "Christianese" word choices.

The existence of Mormonese, a religolect specific to The Church of Jesus Christ of Latter-day Saints, has also been a subject of study.

== See also ==
- Code-switching
- Dialect
- Sociolect
- Shibboleth
- Lark News, Christian satirical newsletter, employing heavy Christianese for comedic effect
- Metaphorical language
