= Ineke Crezee =

Health and legal interpreter and translator and academic

Ineke Crezee ONZM
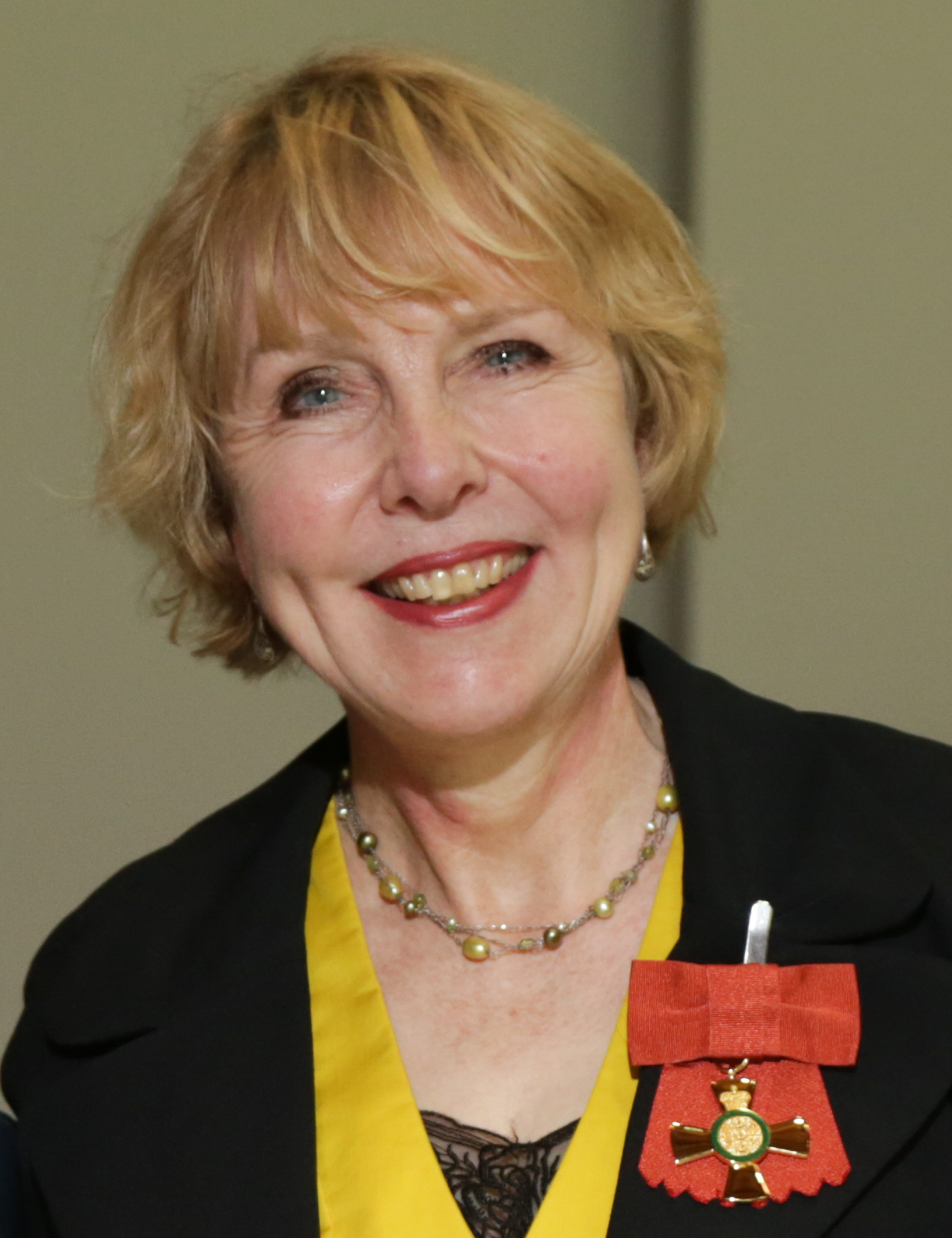
- Crezee in 2020
- Born: Hendrika Martine Crezee

Academic background
- Education: Universiteit van Amsterdam; Auckland University of Technology
- Thesis: I understand it well, but I cannot say it proper back: language use among older Dutch migrants in New Zealand (2008)
- Doctoral advisor: Allan Bell; Koenraad Kuiper

Academic work
- Discipline: Linguistics
- Sub-discipline: Translation and interpreting
- Institutions: Auckland University of Technology

Hendrika Martine Crezee ONZM, known as Ineke Crezee, is a New Zealand linguist. She is a professor at the Auckland University of Technology, specialising in healthcare interpreting and in the education of interpreters and translators.

== Academic career ==
Crezee has a Bachelor of Arts degree in English language and literature and a Master of Arts degree in English from the Free University of Amsterdam, and both a 4-year Diploma in Translation Studies and a Master of Arts degree in Translation Studies from the University of Amsterdam. She completed a PhD at the Auckland University of Technology (AUT) in 2008, with her thesis titled I understand it well, but I cannot say it proper back: language use among older Dutch migrants in New Zealand. Crezee joined the faculty at AUT in February 1999, and in October 2020 became New Zealand's first professor of translation and interpreting. Crezee teaches courses in interpreting in community, healthcare, and legal settings, as well as health translation.

In 2013, Crezee won a Fulbright New Zealand Scholar Award (Public Health) and conducted research on the difference between medical interpreters and bilingual navigators at Seattle Children's Hospital. In 2016, she ran a course for bilingual patient navigators at Middlemore Hospital in South Auckland. Crezee's 2013 book Introduction to healthcare for interpreters and translators (published with John Benjamins) has appeared in special versions for interpreters and translators working with Spanish (2015), Chinese (2016), Arabic (2016) and Korean (2016). Japanese (2017), Russian (2021) and Turkish (2022).

Crezee has served as both Auckland president and national secretary of the New Zealand Society of Translators and Interpreters.

== Honours and awards ==
In the 2020 New Year Honours, Crezee was appointed an Officer of the New Zealand Order of Merit, for services to interpreter and translator education.

== Selected works ==
- Ineke H.M. Crezee; Oktay Eser; Fatih Karakaş (13 October 2022), Introduction to Healthcare for Turkish-speaking Interpreters and Translators, doi:10.1075/z.241, Wikidata Q118143006
- Ineke H.M. Crezee; Johanna Hautekiet; Lidia Rura (15 November 2021), Introduction to Healthcare for Russian-speaking Interpreters and Translators, doi:10.1075/z.239, Wikidata Q118143008
