= Allan Bell (sociolinguist) =

New Zealand linguist

Allan Bell (born 26 July 1947) is a New Zealand academic and sociolinguistic researcher. He has written extensively on New Zealand English, language style, and media language. He is a founding co-editor of the international quarterly Journal of Sociolinguistics and is known for his theory of audience design. Currently, he is the director of the Institute of Culture, Discourse & Communication and is a professor of language and communication at Auckland University of Technology.

== Education and early career ==
Bell received a PhD scholarship from the University of Auckland in 1970. Bell went to London, England and began attending and auditing courses that were being taught by well-known London linguists, including Randolph Quirk, Ruth Kempson, Neil Smith, Dick Hudson, and Bill Downs.

With Bill Labov serving as the external examiner for his PhD dissertation, Bell modeled his research in a similar manner that Labov had done by looking at the similarities and differences of different radio stations through varying social class audiences. Bell alluded in his dissertation that he applied VSLX methods to the study of newspaper language: "And I remember writing you know from New Zealand such a distant star in the Linguistic universe. Transformational grammar said, 'you can't do this kind of work' you know studying news language to see how style works. You know there's no way to do this. It varies. We don't do 'vary.' Well, I discovered that there were these people who had started to study variation and that made possible what I did."

Bell's dissertation took three radio stations in New Zealand, each one coming from the same studio, in order to tackle certain linguistic variables: consonant cluster simplification; the voicing of intervocalic t; negative contraction, auxiliary contraction, and specific determiner deletion. Through the use of VSLX techniques, Bell was able to uncover numerous differences amongst the radio stations. Bell led an audience survey, which uncovered that different sections and communities of the New Zealand population were being targeted in different manners by the radio stations. This led Bell to conclude that people will shift their styles based on who the audience they are targeting is. This idea led Bell to develop the theory of audience design, a theory that landed a prominent place within the field of sociolinguistics.

While also doing work within the field of sociolinguistics, Bell has worked as a journalist and editor for several news outlets, including daily news services, weekly newspapers, and monthly magazines. Bell was an Honorary Research Fellow at Victoria University in Wellington, New Zealand.

Bell's notable students include Ineke Crezee, who completed her doctorate at Auckland University of Technology in 2008, supervised by Bell and Koenraad Kuiper.

== Journal of Sociolinguistics ==
Bell co-founded Journal of Sociolinguistics in 1996 with Nikolas Coupland. Having served as regular correspondents to each other's work since the mid-1980s, Bell and Coupland wanted to find a project or study that the two could work on together. The two decided to establish a new Sociolinguistics journal, especially during time when the field was beginning to grow and more publications were needed to be published: "But we had this idea that it would be nice to start a journal. We were both in awe of Language in Society and you know there were certainly other important journals around as well. But it simply occurred to me I think that there wasn't a journal called anything to do with Sociolinguistics and why not? And the [Sociolinguistics] Symposium was growing and there was lot of work around, and we thought we could make it work. So, we approached Blackwell and they were utterly wonderful from the very beginning. They saw the opportunity."

The journal was well supported by members of the Sociolinguistic community. Encompassing various areas of sociolinguistics, the journal sought to promote contributions that present thorough research in linguistic and social-scientific endeavors. Bell and Coupland served as co-editors until 2007, which was when Coupland retired and Bell became the primary editor.

== Publications ==
=== New Zealand Ways of Speaking English (1990) ===
Co-edited with Janet Holmes, Bell discusses the attitudes, variations, and changes that are associated with New Zealand English. Also offers a pragmatic analysis of New Zealand discourse.

=== The Language of News Media (1991) ===
Discussing what media language is and how important the process of producing it is, Bell emphasizes throughout the publication that journalists and editors don't produce articles, but rather stories that have viewpoints and values that are meant to be analyzed. Bell also stresses his concerns on how audiences can influence media language styles and reconfigure the news that comes along with it.

=== Approaches to Media Discourse (1998) ===
Co-edited with Peter Garrett, Bell covers the approaches that are most prominent within media discourse:

- Opinions and ideologies in the press
- Structure of stories in the news
- Television news discourse
- Political and economic news discourse
- Front page discourse

=== New Zealand English (2000) ===
Co-edited with Koenraad Kuiper, includes up to date information on all significant aspects related to New Zealand English and represents past and new research on the topic.

=== Languages of New Zealand (2006) ===
Co-edited with Ray Harlow and Donna Starks, Bell looks at New Zealand English, a more recent variety of English that younger New Zealanders have started to claim as part of their identities. Bell, Harlow, and Starks distinguish the use of New Zealand English through the "use of Maori words such as kia ora (hello) and grammatical features such as 'at the weekend'."

=== The Guidebook to Sociolinguistics (2013) ===
Serving as a comprehensive oversight to the field, Bell gives an overview of the main terms and concepts of Sociolinguistics. He also discusses the goals and methods that come along with the field. Bell discusses the numerous areas that are associated with the study:

- Multilingualism
- Language shift and maintenance
- Language birth, death, and in time
- Variation in language and situated language
- Language theories and engagement

== See also ==
- Sociolinguistics
- Audience Design
