= Audience design =

Sociolinguistic model

Audience design is a sociolinguistic model formulated by Herb Clark and Gregory Murphy in 1982 and later elaborated by Allan Bell in 1984 which proposes that linguistic style-shifting occurs primarily in response to a speaker's audience. According to this model, speakers adjust their speech primarily towards that of their audience in order to express solidarity or intimacy with them, or away from their audience's speech to express distance.

== History ==
In the mid-1960's, sociologist Harvey Sacks lectured on the concept of 'recipient design' where speakers judge what a listener is likely to understand, and choose their words accordingly, so as to be understood. Listeners could then display their understanding or signal that they did not, allowing the speaker to clarify. The sociolinguist William Labov suggested that style-shifting was a function of attention paid to speech, and developed techniques for eliciting various styles of speech during research interviews. Some sociolinguists, among them Bell, have questioned whether Labov's categories of speech style apply outside the confines of the sociolinguistic interview, and some have suggested that attention to speech alone does not account for all types of style-shifting.

== Allan Bell's research ==
The audience design model was inspired by Giles' communication accommodation theory and Bell's own research on the speech of radio news broadcasters in New Zealand. The study focused on two radio stations which shared the same recording studio and some of the same individual newsreaders. One station, National Radio, attracted an audience from higher socioeconomic brackets. The other, a local community station, drew a broader range of listeners including those from lower socioeconomic brackets.

Bell's analysis of the newsreaders' speech revealed that they spoke differently based on the intended radio audience. He identified relationships in the frequency of sociolinguistic variables, such as postvocalic [t], which corresponded to the speech of the radio audiences. Bell proposed that because the topic of speech (identical news topics), speaker, and speech activity were the same, the most plausible way of accounting for the variation was that the newscasters were attuning their speech to what they perceived to be the norms for the respective radio audiences.

== Audience types ==
The audience design framework distinguishes between several kinds of audience types based on three criteria from the perspective of the speaker: known (whether an addressee is known to be part of a speech context), ratified (the speaker acknowledges the listener's presence in the speech context), or addressed (the listener is directly spoken to). The impact of audience members on the speaker's style-shifting is proportional to the degree to which the speaker recognizes and ratifies them. Bell defined the following audience types:

- Addressee – listeners who are known, ratified, and addressed
- Auditor – listeners who are not directly addressed, but are known and ratified
- Overhearer – non-ratified listeners of whom the speaker is aware
- Eavesdropper – non-ratified listeners of whom the speaker is unaware

== Referee design ==
In addition to audience design, Bell introduces an additional component of style shifting which he terms 'referee design'. This type of style-shifting refers to situations where the speaker does not accommodate to the speech style of their immediate audience, but rather "creatively uses language features ... from beyond the immediate speech community". In contrast with audience design, which can be defined as a responsive style-shift where the speaker responds to specific factors of the speech context, referee design is characterised as an initiative shift. In such situations, speakers may use styles associated with non-present social groups to signal hypothetical allegiances with these speakers.

For instance, Rickford and McNair-Knox examined the speech of Foxy Boston, an African-American teenager. Whilst on the whole they found that Foxy showed higher levels of AAVE features when communicating with African-American interviewers than with the European interviewer, thereby demonstrating the effect of audience design, in one situation Foxy showed considerably lower levels of AAVE features when interacting with the African-American interviewers. Interpreting these patterns, Rickford and McNair-Knox argue that Foxy's speech can be interpreted in terms of referee design. At the time, Foxy was attending a mainstream American High School where Standard American English was likely to be overtly prescribed. Thus, it is possible that Foxy was designing her speech to reflect the norms of a non-present speech community with which she identifies.

== See also ==
- Allan Bell
- Sociolinguistics
- Style shifting
- William Labov
