= Information gap task =

An information gap task is a technique in language teaching where students are missing information necessary to complete a task or solve a problem, and must communicate with their classmates to fill in the gaps. It is often used in communicative language teaching and task-based language learning. Information gap tasks are contrasted with opinion gap tasks, in which all information is shared at the start of the activity, and learners give their own opinions on the information given.

== Examples ==
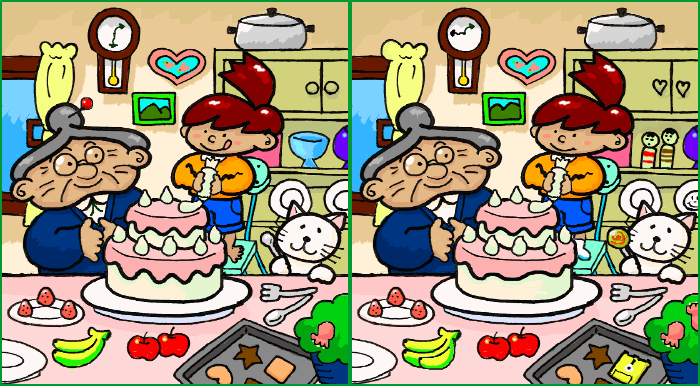
An example of a spot-the-difference activity

One example of an information gap task is a spot-the-difference activity. Another is an activity where one student is given a picture, and must describe it to another student, who creates a drawing from the description. Further examples are students sharing information to complete a class timetable, and an activity where students must share information about their families and then draw each other's family trees.

== Testing ==
Information gap tasks are also used to test language ability. According to Underhill, these kind of tasks have the advantage that they produce concrete evidence of communicative competence, or of the lack of it, but the disadvantage of only testing the ability to communicate factual information. He goes on to say that with information gap tasks, care must be taken not to create a test which tests general problem-solving ability more than language fluency.

== Bibliography ==
- Ellis, Rod (2003). Task-Based Language Learning and Teaching. Oxford: Oxford University Press. ISBN 978-0-19-442159-1.
- Larsen-Freeman, Diane (2000). Techniques and Principles in Language Teaching. Oxford: Oxford University Press. ISBN 978-0-19-435574-2.
- Richards, Jack C.; Schmidt, Richard, eds. (2009). "Information gap". Longman Dictionary of Language Teaching and Applied Linguistics. New York: Longman. p. 282. ISBN 978-1-4082-0460-3.
- Underhill, Nic (1987). Testing Spoken Language: A Handbook of Oral Testing Techniques. Cambridge University Press. ISBN 978-0-521-31276-9.
