= Ethnography of communication =

Analysis of communication

The ethnography of communication (EOC), originally called the ethnography of speaking, is the analysis of communication within the wider context of the social and cultural practices and beliefs of the members of a particular culture or speech community. It comes from ethnographic research. It is a method of discourse analysis in linguistics that draws on the anthropological field of ethnography. Unlike ethnography proper, though, EOC takes into account both the communicative form, which may include but is not limited to spoken language, and its function within the given culture.

General aims of this qualitative research method include being able to discern which communication acts and/or codes are important to different groups, what types of meanings groups apply to different communication events, and how group members learn these codes, in order to provide insight into particular communities. This additional insight may be used to enhance communication with group members, make sense of group members’ decisions, and distinguish groups from one another, among other things.

== Origins ==
Dell Hymes proposed the ethnography of communication as an approach towards analyzing patterns of language use within speech communities, in order to provide support for his idea of communicative competence, which itself was a reaction to Noam Chomsky's distinction between linguistic competence and linguistic performance.

Originally coined "ethnography of speaking" in Dell Hymes' eponymous 1962 paper, it was redefined in his 1964 paper, Introduction: Toward Ethnographies of Communication to accommodate for the non-vocal and non-verbal characteristics of communication, although most EOC researchers still tend to focus upon speaking as it is generally considered "to be a prominent - even primordial - means of communication."

The term "ethnography of communication" is meant to be descriptive of the characteristics that an approach towards language from an anthropological standpoint must take. Namely, according to Dell Hymes, it must 1) "investigate directly the use of language in contexts of situations so as to discern patterns proper to speech activity" and 2) "take as context a community, investigating its communicative habits as a whole." In other words, rather than divorcing linguistic form from its function, the analysis of a culture's or community's communication, linguistic and otherwise, must occur with respect to the sociocultural context of its use and the functions of the meanings conveyed. As Deborah Cameron puts it, "If you are mainly concerned with the way a certain speech event fits into a whole network of cultural beliefs and practices, you will spend more time describing things that are external to the talk itself: who the speakers are, where they are, what beliefs and customs are important in their lives."

== Usage ==
In their book Qualitative Communication Research Methods, communications scholars Thomas R. Lindlof and Bryan C. Taylor explain, "Ethnography of communication conceptualizes communication as a continuous flow of information, rather than as a segmented exchange of messages." According to Deborah Cameron, EOC can be thought of as the application of ethnographic methods to the communication patterns of a group. Littlejohn and Foss recall that Dell Hymes suggests that "cultures communicate in different ways, but all forms of communication require a shared code, communicators who know and use the code, a channel, a setting, a message form, a topic, and an event created by transmission of the message." "EOC studies," according to Lindlof and Taylor, "produce highly detailed analysis of communication codes and their moment-to-moment functions in various contexts. In these analyses, speech communities are constituted in local and continuous performances of cultural and moral matters."

EOC can be used as a means by which to study the interactions among members of a specific culture or "speech community," which is any group of people that creates and establishes its own speaking codes and norms. Gerry Philipsen explained, "Each community has its own cultural values about speaking and these are linked to judgments of situational appropriateness."

The meaning and the understanding of the presence or absence of speech within different communities will vary. Local cultural patterns and norms must be understood to analyze and interpret the appropriateness of speech act within specific communities. Thus, "the statement that talk is not anywhere valued equally in all social contexts suggests a research strategy for discovering and describing cultural or subcultural differences in the value of speaking. Speaking is one among other symbolic resources which are allocated and distributed in social situations according to distinctive culture patterns."

Hymes also used EOC to argue against the strong view of the Sapir-Whorf hypothesis, the idea that one's language determines one's cognitive ability. While Hymes believed that one's language affected one's world view, he argued that the extent of that effect depended "on the circumstances of its acquisition, and its place in the linguistic repertoire of a person and a community."

== The SPEAKING model ==
A model that Hymes developed as a framework for the analysis of a speech event within its cultural context is the mnemonic SPEAKING model. The model consists of sixteen components, which Hymes believed were necessary to consider in order to accurately and satisfactorily describe any particular speech event: message form, message content, setting, scene, speaker/sender, addressor, hearer/receiver/audience, addressee, purposes (outcomes), purposes (goals), key, channels, forms of speech, norms of interaction, norms of interpretation, and genres. These sixteen components are organized into eight divisions to form the acronym SPEAKING.

- S - setting and scene: where the speech event is located in time and space
- P - participants: who takes part in the speech event, and in what role (e.g. speaker, addressee, audience, eavesdropper)
- E - ends: what the purpose of the speech event is, and what its outcome is meant to be
- A - act sequence: what speech acts make up the speech event, and what order they are performed in
- K - key: the tone or manner of performance (serious or joking, sincere or ironic, etc.)
- I - instrumentalities: what channel or medium of communication is used (e.g. speaking, signing, writing, drumming, whistling), and what language/variety is selected from the participants' repertoire
- N - norms of interaction: what the rules are for producing and interpreting speech acts
- G - genres: what 'type' does a speech event belong to (e.g. interview, gossip), and what other pre-existing conventional forms of speech are drawn on or 'cited' in producing appropriate contributions to talk (e.g. do people quote from mythology or poetry or scripture?)

While the SPEAKING model is a valuable model to EOC, as well as the descriptive framework most commonly used in ethnography of communication, Cameron cautions that Hymes' model should be used more as a guide than a template, because adhering to it too narrowly may create a limiting view of the subject of its study. Ethnography of communication, according to Cameron, should strive not only to "address such 'descriptive' questions as 'what speech events occur in such-and-such a community?' and 'what are the components of speech events X, Y, and Z?'", but also to explain "why particular events occur and why they have particular characteristics."

== Notable studies ==
Several research studies have used ethnography of communication as a methodological tool when conducting empirical research. Examples of this work include Philipsen's study, which examined the ways in which blue-collar men living near Chicago spoke or did not speak based on communication context and personal identity relationship status (i.e. whether they were considered to be of symmetrical or asymmetrical social status). Other examples include Katriel's study of Israeli communication acts involving griping and joking about national and public problems, as well as Carbaugh's comparative studies of communication in a variety of intercultural contexts. These studies not only identify communication acts, codes, rules, functions, and norms, but they also offer different ways in which the method can be applied. Joel Sherzer's Kuna Ways of Speaking investigates the ways of speaking among the Guna people of Panama. This is a landmark study that focuses on curing ways, everyday speaking, puberty rites, and gathering house speech-making. It was the first monograph that explicitly took an ethnography of speaking perspective to the whole range of verbal practices among a group of people.

== See also ==
- Qualitative methods
- Communication theory
- Linguistic relativity
- Pragmatics
- Gerry Philipsen
- Speech codes theory
