= Sociolinguistics research in India =

Sociolinguistic research in India is the study of how the Indian society affects and is affected by the languages of the country.

India is a highly multilingual nation, where many languages are spoken and also studied, both as part of linguistics and with the aim of aiding community development. Though theoretical and comparative linguistics have a long history in the country (dating back to perhaps the first millennium BCE), few researchers have concentrated on the sociolinguistic situation of India.

== Context ==
India is a particularly challenging and rewarding country in which to conduct sociolinguistic research due to the large number of languages spoken in the country (415 are listed in the SIL Ethnologue).

== History of sociolinguistic research ==
Variation between Indian languages has been noted for millennia: by Tolkāppiyar (Tamil) in his "Tolkāppiyam"(5 BCE);Yaska in his Nirutka (500 BCE); Patanjali (200 BCE); Bharata in his Natyasastra (500 CE); and Abu'l-Fazl ibn Mubarak in his Ain-e-Akbari (16th century).

The classification of languages, particularly with regard to regional differences and to so-called 'hybrid' languages, continued to progress during the 19th century. From 1881, language information was explicitly sought in the census, which found a total of 162 languages in the country (116 Indian languages and 46 foreign languages). Questions about language continued to be included in the 10-yearly census in the following years, and in 1896 George Abraham Grierson began his Language Survey of India, in which he tried to classify Indian languages based on the distribution of morpho-phonemic differences.

Jules Bloch published a study on caste dialects in 1910, however this was not followed up for some decades.

Early Indian research into sociolinguistics can be said to have begun in the early 1960s. Charles A. Ferguson published Diglossia (1959) on variation as a developmental and functional phenomenon of language, while John J. Gumperz published on the linguistic aspects of caste differentiation in 1960. Both topics were quickly picked up by Indian linguists. In the mid-1960s, William Labov added an interest in variation within the speech of a caste.

A seminar on "Language and Society in India" was held in 1967 and in 1969 the Central Institute of Indian Languages was founded, which had a particular success into drawing young linguists into applied studies. In 1972 the University of Delhi introduced the first sociolinguistics course.

Almost a hundred years after Grierson's survey, the International Centre for Research on Bilingualism completed its sociolinguistic Survey of India (1983-86), covering 50 major and minor languages in the country. Originally it had been intended to cover all the written languages except Sanskrit and English, but not enough data were collected for the other 47 languages reviewed.

== Fields of research ==
=== Caste dialects ===
Following Bloch's 1910 work on caste dialects, further studies were carried out in the 1960s by (among others) William McCormack, in an attempt to discover the origin and method of transmission of caste dialects, and by A. K. Ramanujan, comparing the kinds of language innovation between Brahmin and non-Brahmin dialects of Tamil. Researchers have studied both the degree of association between caste distinctions and linguistic differences, and the methods and reasons for maintaining these differences.

=== Diglossia and Code switching ===
Ferguson (1959) first used the term "diglossia", whereby languages exhibit two or more distinct styles of speech in different contexts, and a number of studies looked into the phenomenon in more depth. Much of this research was focused on Tamil, but diglossia in Sinhalese and in Telugu was also studied.

Shanmugam Pillai attempted to analyse code switching among Kanyakumari fishermen (1968) with regard to the hierarchy of the caste structure. Other research into code switching has studied it in the context of minority-majority interactions, urban and tribal transactions, and other special settings.

=== Language planning ===
With help from the Central Institute of Indian Languages, language planning became a subject in Indian linguistic courses. Institutes in Language Planning were held in 1977, 1980 and 1987, and the New Language Planning Newsletter began in 1985.

=== Others ===
Other social variables have also been studied, such as urbanness and education; informal friendship contacts; and occupation and residence. There has also been pioneering work on the linguistic landscape of India.

== Important researchers ==
Besides those already mentioned, the following researchers have been instrumental in the development of Indian sociolinguistics:

- William Bright who, along with A. K. Ramanujan, wrote early work on phonetic and phonemic innovation in Brahman and non-Brahman dialects. Bright also wrote on semantic structural differences among speakers.
- Murray Barnson Emeneau, who had written the classic paper India as a Linguistic Area, also wrote on ritual language and ritual culture.
- Prabodh Bechardas Pandit focused on sociolinguistic aspects of convergence and language shift.

== Contribution of sociolinguistics to Indian society ==
Sociolinguistic research has contributed to language in education, administration, and codification efforts of language standardisation.

== See also ==
- Dravidian studies
- Languages of India
- Caste
