= Notional-functional syllabus =

Method of education

A notional-functional syllabus is a way of organizing a language-learning curriculum, rather than a method or an approach to teaching. In a notional-functional syllabus, instruction is not organized in terms of grammatical structure, as had often been done with the audio-lingual method, but instead in terms of "notions" and "functions."

In this model, a "notion" is a particular context in which people communicate. A "function" is a specific purpose for a speaker in a given context. For example, the "notion," of shopping requires numerous language "functions," such as asking about prices or features of a product and bargaining. Functions are often speech acts, utterances used to accomplish some real world task, a concept elucidated by the linguistic philosopher John L. Austin.

Proponents of the notional-functional syllabus (Van Ek & Alexander, 1975; Wilkins, 1976) claimed that it addressed the deficiencies they found in the audio-lingual method by helping students develop their ability to effectively communicate in a variety of real-life contexts.
