= Sprechbund =

Concept in sociolinguistics

A Sprechbund (/ˈsprɛkbʊnd/; German: [ˈʃpʁɛçbʊnt], "speech bond") is a "shared [way] of speaking which [goes] beyond language boundaries" (Romaine, 1994:23). Thus people speaking different languages can share certain linguistic characteristics.

This is a particularly useful concept for describing, for example, hip-hop music. Hip-hop has a number of defining characteristics including musical style, clothing, and association with minorities. It also has a number of defining linguistic characteristics like rapping, rhyme and human beatboxing. These are essentially linguistic features, but they can be used in any language – even genetically unrelated languages. Their combined use in different languages allows a kind of universal "language of hip-hop".

The sprechbund is to be contrasted with the sprachbund, which refers to "relatedness at the level of linguistic form" (Romaine 1994:23). A sprachbund is a group of languages that have become structurally similar in some way because of geographical proximity. As the names suggest, sprechbund is about speech, and how language is produced; sprachbund is about the underlying structure of language.
