= Gerry Philipsen =

American academic and ethnographer

Gerry Philipsen (born 1944), Professor Emeritus of Communication at the University of Washington is an American academic and ethnographer of communication. Philipsen's research treats communicative acts as occurring within cultural, social and small group settings. He is most noted for developing speech code theory a framework for communication in a given speech community. Speech code theory explores the manner in which groups communicate based on societal, cultural, gender, occupational or other factors. Philipsen received recognition for his lifetime achievement from the National Communication Association. Philipsen was born in Portland, Oregon in 1944.

== Academic work ==
Philipsen earned a Bachelor of Arts in Social Science and in Speech from the University of Denver in 1967. In 1972, he went on to graduate with a Ph.D. in Communication Studies from Northwestern University. Following graduation he joined the faculty of University of California, Santa Barbara, where he taught from 1972 until 1978. In 1978, Philipsen joined the University of Washington. He remained at the University of Washington until his retirement in 2013.

== Awards and recognition ==
While a member of the faculty at the University of Washington he was awarded:

- 1984 Distinguished Teaching Award (University of Washington)
- 2000 Faculty Distinguished Contribution to Lifelong Learning (The 1st of this award) (University of Washington)
- 2013 Distinguished Scholar Award (National Communication Association)
  - Meant to honor those in the study of human communication for their lifetime achievements.

Other honors:

- 2008 Carroll C. Arnold Distinguished Lecture (National Communication Association)
- 2013 To honor Philipsen, the University of Washington created the Gerry Philipsen Debate Forum.

== Speech code theory ==
Before speech codes theory got its name Philipsen first referred to this theory as the Ethnography of Communication. He decided to change it because he recognized that many people could not get past the idea of Ethnography as simply a research method.^{[7]} He was considered a naturalist who watched, listened and recorded communicative conduct in a cultures natural setting. Em Griffin^{[1]} stated that, "Many people can't get past the idea of ethnography as simply a research method." With that being said, Philipsen moved from description to explanation, resulting in him labeling his work "speech codes theory". Philipsen's ultimate goal was to develop a theory that would capture the relationship between communication and culture.

"The Speech Codes theory was created for ultimately two purposes. The first was to distill some of what might be learned from a large body of fieldwork research on culturally distinctive ways of speaking. The second was to provide a focus for further research and discussion. The theory was first published in prototypical form with an introduction to the concept of speech codes and a presentation of four empirically grounded principles about speech codes. It was presented as a formal theoretical statements with five empirical grounded propositions, four of which were carried over intact from the earlier version." (Philipsen, Coutu and Covarrubias).^{[3]}

There were four questions that Philipsen sought to answer through his research on the Speech Code Theory:

1. the existence of distinctive speech codes
2. the substance of the speech codes (whether they contained a vocabulary or way of speaking that held meanings for social constructs and worlds).
3. how speech codes could be observed and formulated.
4. the force of the speech code in social life. (Philipsen and Albrecht 119-156) ^{[4]}

Works by Basil Bernstein heavily influenced Philipsen. Bernstein used the term "speech codes" in sociology and further elaborated on speech codes and their contexts. He stated that, "within the same society, there can exist different social groups or social classes whose communicative practices differ in important ways" (Philipsen, 1997). Bernstein argues that people have different ways of speaking, which shapes and reinforces their understanding of themselves, other people, and social life. Bernstein believes that a coding principle is, "a rule governing what to say and how to say it in a particular context." ^{[4]}
