= Dell Hymes =

American anthropologist and linguist (1927–2009)

- Born: June 7, 1927; Portland, Oregon
- Died: November 13, 2009 (aged 82); Charlottesville, Virginia

Academic background
- Education: Indiana University Bloomington (PhD), Reed College
- Thesis: The language of the Kathlamet Chinook (1955)

Academic work
- Institutions: University of Pennsylvania, University of California, Berkeley, Harvard University
- Notable students: Regna Darnell, Richard Bauman

Dell Hathaway Hymes (June 7, 1927, in Portland, Oregon – November 13, 2009, in Charlottesville, Virginia) was a linguist, sociolinguist, anthropologist, and folklorist who established disciplinary foundations for the comparative, ethnographic study of language use. His research focused upon the languages of the Pacific Northwest. He was one of the first to call the fourth subfield of anthropology "linguistic anthropology" instead of "anthropological linguistics". The terminological shift draws attention to the field's grounding in anthropology rather than in what, by that time, had already become an autonomous discipline (linguistics). In 1972 Hymes founded the journal Language in Society and served as its editor for 22 years.

== Early life and education ==
He was educated at Reed College, studying under David H. French; and after a stint in prewar Korea, he graduated in 1950. His work in the United States Army as a decoder is part of what influenced him to become a linguist. Hymes earned his PhD in linguistics from Indiana University Bloomington in 1955. As a young Ph.D. graduate, Hymes carefully analyzed a corpus, within the publication by Melville Jacobs of the songs and stories of Victoria Howard, developing new approaches to the interpretation of oral narratives. He went on to take a job at Harvard University.

Even at that young age, Hymes had a reputation as a strong linguist; his dissertation, completed in one year, was a grammar of the Kathlamet language spoken near the mouth of the Columbia and known primarily from Franz Boas’s work at the end of the 19th century.

== Career ==
From 1955, Hymes taught at Harvard University for five years, leaving in 1960 to join the faculty of the University of California, Berkeley, where he spent another five years before joining the Department of Anthropology at the University of Pennsylvania in 1965 (where he succeeded A. Irving Hallowell). In 1972 he joined the Department of Folklore and Folklife and in 1975 he became Dean of the University of Pennsylvania Graduate School of Education.

He served as president of the American Folklore Society in 1973, the Linguistic Society of America in 1982, and the American Anthropological Association in 1983—the last person to have held all three positions.

While at Penn, Hymes was a founder of the journal Language in Society.

Hymes later joined the Departments of Anthropology and English at the University of Virginia, where he became the Commonwealth Professor of Anthropology and English, and from which he retired in 2000, continuing as emeritus professor until his death from complications of Alzheimer's disease on November 13, 2009.

== Sexual harassment allegations ==
Hymes was accused of sexual harassment in the later years of his tenure at the University of Pennsylvania. According to The Daily Pennsylvanian, this included:

...his female graduate advisees being nicknamed 'Hymes' Harem,' female GSE faculty testifying against Hymes for sexual harassment, and Penn faculty in other schools severing their formal ties with GSE after multiple women filed sexual discrimination lawsuits for being denied tenure.

As a result of these allegations, in 2018 his portrait was removed from the Graduate School of Education.

== Influences on his work ==
Hymes was influenced by a number of linguists, anthropologists and sociologists; notably Franz Boas, Edward Sapir and Harry Hoijer of the Americanist Tradition; Roman Jakobson and others of the Prague Linguistic Circle; sociologist Erving Goffman and anthropologist Ray L. Birdwhistell, both his colleagues at Penn; and ethnomethodologists Harold Garfinkel, Harvey Sacks, Emanuel Schegloff and Gail Jefferson.

Hymes' career can be divided into at least two phases. In his early career Hymes adapted Prague School Functionalism to American Linguistic Anthropology, pioneering the study of the relationship between language and social context. Together with John Gumperz, Erving Goffman and William Labov, Hymes defined a broad multidisciplinary concern with language in society.

Hymes' later work focuses on poetics, particularly the poetic organization of Native American oral narratives. He and Dennis Tedlock defined ethnopoetics as a field of study within linguistic anthropology and folkloristics. Hymes considers literary critic Kenneth Burke his biggest influence on this latter work, saying, "My sense of what I do probably owes more to KB than to anyone else." Hymes studied with Burke in the 1950s. Burke's work was theoretically and topically diverse, but the idea that seems most influential on Hymes is the application of rhetorical criticism to poetry.

Hymes has included many other literary figures and critics among his influences, including Robert Alter, C. S. Lewis, A. L. Kroeber, and Claude Lévi-Strauss.

== Significance of his work ==
As one of the first sociolinguists, Hymes helped to pioneer the connection between speech and social relations, placing linguistic anthropology at the center of the performative turn within anthropology and the social sciences more generally.

Hymes formulated a response to Noam Chomsky's influential distinction between competence (knowledge of grammatical rules necessary to decoding and producing language) and performance (actual language use in context). Hymes objected to the marginalization of performance from the center of linguistic inquiry and proposed the notion of communicative competence, or knowledge necessary to use language in social context, as an object of linguistic inquiry.

Since appropriate language use is conventionally defined, and varies across different communities, much of Hymes early work frames a project for ethnographic investigation into contrasting patterns of language use across speech communities. Hymes termed this approach "the ethnography of speaking".

The SPEAKING acronym, described below, was presented as a lighthearted heuristic to aid fieldworkers in their attempt to document and analyze instances of language use, which he termed "speech events". Embedded in the acronym is an application and extension of Roman Jakobson's arguments concerning the multifunctionality of language. He articulated other, more technical, often typologically oriented approaches to variation in patterns of language use across speech communities in a series of articles.

As a result of discussions primarily with Ray Birdwhistell at the University of Pennsylvania, in his later work, Hymes renamed the "ethnography of speaking" the "ethnography of communication" to reflect the broadening of focus from instances of language production to the ways in which communication (including oral, written, broadcast, acts of receiving/listening) is conventionalized in a given community of users, and to include nonverbal as well as verbal behavior.

With Erving Goffman and John Szwed, he established the Center for Urban Ethnography in 1969. The goal was to fund research by both faculty and students at Penn that used urban ethnography as the primary method, and much innovative research resulted. The first major grant came from the National Institute of Mental Health, funding much research emphasizing different racial and ethnic groups; the second from the U.S. National Institute of Education, funding classroom ethnography. With Erving Goffman he co-edited the series Conduct and Communication for the University of Pennsylvania Press as a way to support research they considered most valuable.

Hymes promoted what he and others call "ethnopoetics", an anthropological method of transcribing and analyzing folklore and oral narrative that pays attention to poetic structures within speech. In reading the transcriptions of Indian myths, for example, which were generally recorded as prose by the anthropologists who came before, Hymes noticed that there are commonly poetic structures in the wording and structuring of the tale. Patterns of words and word use follow patterned, artistic forms.

Hymes' goal, in his own mind, is to understand the artistry and "the competence... that underlies and informs such narratives". He created the Dell Hymes Model of Speaking and coined the term communicative competence within language education.

Narratives can be entertaining stories or important myths about the nature of the world; in addition, narratives can also convey the importance of aboriginal environmental management knowledge such as fish spawning cycles in local rivers or the disappearance of grizzly bears from Oregon. Hymes believes that all narratives in the world are organized around implicit principles of form which convey important knowledge and ways of thinking and of viewing the world. He argues that understanding narratives will lead to a fuller understanding of the language itself and those fields informed by storytelling, in which he includes ethnopoetics, sociolinguistics, psycholinguistics, rhetoric, semiotics, pragmatics, narrative inquiry and literary criticism.

Hymes clearly considers folklore and narrative a vital part of the fields of linguistics, anthropology and literature; and has bemoaned the fact that so few scholars in those fields are willing and able to adequately include folklore in its original language in their considerations. He feels that the translated versions of the stories are inadequate for understanding the stories' roles in the social or mental system in which they existed. He provides an example that in Navajo, the particles (utterances such as "uh," "so," "well," etc. that have linguistic if not semantic meaning) omitted in the English translation are essential to understanding how the story is shaped and how repetition defines the structure that the text embodies.

Hymes was the founding editor for the journal Language in Society, which he edited for 22 years.

== The "S-P-E-A-K-I-N-G" model ==
Hymes developed a valuable model to assist the identification and labeling of components of linguistic interaction that was driven by his view that, in order to speak a language correctly, one needs not only to learn its vocabulary and grammar, but also the context in which words are used.

The model had sixteen components that can be applied to many sorts of discourse: message form; message content; setting; scene; speaker/sender; addressor; hearer/receiver/audience; addressee; purposes (outcomes); purposes (goals); key; channels; forms of speech; norms of interaction; norms of interpretation; and genres.

Hymes constructed the acronym SPEAKING, under which he grouped the sixteen components within eight divisions:

=== Setting and scene ===
"Setting refers to the time and place of a speech act and, in general, to the physical circumstances" - The living room in the grandparents' home might be a setting for a family story. Scene is the "psychological setting" or "cultural definition" of a setting, including characteristics such as range of formality and sense of play or seriousness. The family story may be told at a reunion celebrating the grandparents' anniversary. At times, the family would be festive and playful; at other times, serious and commemorative.

=== Participants ===
Speaker and audience - Linguists will make distinctions within these categories; for example, the audience can be distinguished as addressees and other hearers. At the family reunion, an aunt might tell a story to the young female relatives, but males, although not addressed, might also hear the narrative.

=== Ends ===
Purposes, goals, and outcomes - The aunt may tell a story about the grandmother to entertain the audience, teach the young women, and honor the grandmother.

=== Act sequence ===
Form and order of the event - The aunt's story might begin as a response to a toast to the grandmother. The story's plot and development would have a sequence structured by the aunt. Possibly there would be a collaborative interruption during the telling. Finally, the group might applaud the tale and move onto another subject or activity.

=== Key ===
Clues that establish the "tone, manner, or spirit" of the speech act - The aunt might imitate the grandmother's voice and gestures in a playful way, or she might address the group in a serious voice emphasizing the sincerity and respect of the praise the story expresses.

=== Instrumentalities ===
Forms and styles of speech - The aunt might speak in a casual register with many dialect features or might use a more formal register and careful grammatically "standard" forms.

=== Norms ===
Social rules governing the event and the participants' actions and reaction - In a playful story by the aunt, the norms might allow many audience interruptions and collaboration, or possibly those interruptions might be limited to participation by older females. A serious, formal story by the aunt might call for attention to her and no interruptions as norms.

=== Genre ===
The kind of speech act or event; for the example used here, the kind of story - The aunt might tell a character anecdote about the grandmother for entertainment, or an exemplum as moral instruction. Different disciplines develop terms for kinds of speech acts, and speech communities sometimes have their own terms for types.

== Family and personal life ==
Hymes' spouse, Virginia Dosch Hymes, was also a sociolinguist and folklorist. They met at Indiana University, marrying in 1954.

== Religious associations ==
Hymes was a member of the Guild of Scholars of The Episcopal Church.

He was a congregant of St. Paul Memorial Church and Peace Lutheran Church in Charlottesville, Virginia.

== Publications ==
- Cazden, C.B., John, V.P., & Hymes, D.H. (Eds.). (1972). Functions of language in the classroom. New York: Teachers College Press.
- Gumperz, J. J., & Hymes, D. (Eds.). (1964). The Ethnography of Communication. Special issue of American Anthropologist, 66 (6), Part II: pages 137–54.
- Gumperz, J. J., & Hymes, D. (1972). Directions in sociolinguistics: The ethnography of communication. New York: Holt, Rinehart, & Winston.
- Hymes, D.H. (1961). Functions of speech: An evolutionary approach. In F. Gruber (Ed.), Anthropology and education. Philadelphia: University of Pennsylvania.
- Hymes, D. (1962). The Ethnography of Speaking. In T. Gladwin & W. C. Sturtevant (Eds.), Anthropology and Human Behavior (pages 13–53). Washington, DC: Anthropology Society of Washington.
- Hymes, D.H. (1963). Toward a history of linguistic anthropology. Anthropological Linguistics, 5(1), pages 59–103.
- Hymes, D.H. (1964a). Directions in (ethno-)linguistic theory. In A.K. Romney & R.G. D’Andrade (Eds.), Transcultural studies of cognition (pages 6–56). American Anthropologist, 66(3), part 2.
- Hymes, D. (Ed.). (1964) Language in Culture and Society: A Reader in Linguistics and Anthropology. New York: Harper & Row.
- Hymes, D.H. (1967). Models of the interaction of language and social setting. Journal of Social Issues, 23(2), pages 8–38.
- Hymes, D.H. (1967). The anthropology of communication. In F.E. Dance (Ed.), Human communication theory: Original essays. New York: Holt, Rinehart and Winston.
- Hymes, D.H. (1970). Linguistic method in ethnography: Its development in the United States. In P. Garvin (Ed.), Method and theory in linguistics. The Hague: Mouton.
- Hymes, D. (1971). Sociolinguistics and the ethnography of speaking. In E. Ardener (Ed.), Social anthropology and language (pages 47–93). London: Routledge.
- Hymes, D. (1971). On linguistic theory, communicative competence, and the education of disadvantaged children. In M.L. Wax, S.A. Diamond & F. Gearing (Eds.), Anthropological perspectives on education (pages 51–66). New York: Basic Books.
- Hymes, D. (Ed.). (1971). Pidginization and Creolization of Languages. London: Cambridge University Press.
- Hymes, D.H. (1972). On communicative competence. In J.B. Pride & J. Holmes (Eds.), Sociolinguistics (pages 269–293). London: Penguin.
- Hymes, D.H. (1972). Editorial introduction. Language in Society, 1, 1–14.
- Hymes, D. (Ed.). (1972). Reinventing Anthropology. New York: Pantheon.
- Hymes, D.H. (1972). Toward ethnographies of communication. In P.P. Giglioli (Ed.), Language and social context (pages 21–44). Harmondsworth: Penguin.
- Hymes, D.H. (1973). Toward linguistic competence. Working Papers in Sociolinguistics, No. 16.
- Hymes, D.H. (1974). Ways of speaking. In R. Bauman & J. Sherzer (Eds.), Explorations in the ethnography of speaking (pages 433–452). Cambridge: Cambridge University Press.
- Hymes, D.H. (Ed.). (1974). Studies in the history of linguistics: Traditions and paradigms. Bloomington: Indiana University Press.
- Hymes, D. (1974). Foundations in Sociolinguistics: An Ethnographic Approach. Philadelphia: University of Pennsylvania Press.
- Hymes, D.H. (1974). An ethnographic perspective. New Literary History, 5, 187–201.
- Hymes, D.H. (1974). Review of Noam Chomsky. In G. Harman (Ed.), "On Noam Chomsky: Critical essays" (pages 316–333). Garden City, New York: Anchor.
- Hymes, D.H. (1975). Breakthrough into performance. In D. Ben-Amos & K. Goldstein (Eds.), Folklore: Performance and communication (pages 11–74). The Hague: Mouton.
- Hymes, D.H. (1976). Toward linguistic competence. Sociologische Gids, 4, 217–239.
- Hymes, D.H. (1976). Discovering oral performance and measured verse in American Indian narrative. New Literary History, 8, 431–457.
- Hymes, D. (1980) In five year patterns. In B. H. Davis & R. K. O'Cain (Eds.), First Person Singular (pages 201–213). Amsterdam: John Benjamins.
- Hymes, D. (1980). Language in Education: Ethnolinguistic Essays. Washington, DC: Center for Applied Linguistics.
- Hymes, D., & Fought, J. (1981). American Structuralism. The Hague: Mouton.
- Hymes, D. (1981). "In Vain I Tried to Tell You": Essays in Native American Ethnopoetics. Philadelphia: University of Pennsylvania Press.
- Hymes, D. (1983). Essays in the History of Linguistic Anthropology. Amsterdam: John Benjamins.
- Hymes, D.H. (1984). Vers la compétence de communication. (Trans. F. Mugler). Paris: Hatier.
- Hymes, D.H. (1985). Toward linguistic competence. AILA Review/Revue de l’AILA (Association Internationale de Linguistique Appliquée), 2, 9–23.
- Hymes, D.H. (1992). Inequality in language: Taking for granted. Working Papers in Educational Linguistics, 8(1), pages 1–30.
- Hymes, D.H. (1993). Inequality in language: Taking for granted. In J.E. Alatis (Ed.), Language, communication, and social meaning (pages 23–40). Washington, D.C.: Georgetown University Press.
- Hymes, D. (1996). Ethnography, Linguistics, Narrative Inequality: Toward an Understanding of Voice. London: Taylor & Francis.
- Hymes, D.H. (1998). When is oral narrative poetry? Generative form and its pragmatic conditions. Pragmatics, 8(4), paages 475–500.
- Hymes, D.H. (1999). Boas on the threshold of ethnopoetics. In R. Darnell & L. Valentine (Eds.), Theorizing the Americanist tradition. University of Toronto Press.
- Hymes, D.H. (2000). The emergence of sociolinguistics: A reply to Samarin. Dialogue, 312–315.
- Hymes, D.H. (2001). Poetry. In A. Duranti (Ed.), Key terms in language and culture. Oxford: Blackwell.
- Hymes, D.H. (2001). Preface. Textus, 14, 189–192.
- Hymes, D. (2003). Now I Know Only So Far: Essays in Ethnopoetics. Lincoln: University of Nebraska Press.

Educational offices
Preceded by Neal Gross	Dean of the University of Pennsylvania Graduate School of Education; 1975–1987	Succeeded by Marvin Lazerson
