= Sociolinguistics =

Study of how society shapes language and language use

Sociolinguistics is the descriptive and scientific study of how language is shaped by and used differently within any given society. The field largely looks at how a language varies between distinct social groups and under the influence of assorted cultural norms, expectations, and contexts, including how that variation plays a role in language change. Sociolinguistics combines the older field of dialectology with the social sciences in order to identify regional dialects, sociolects, ethnolects, and other sub-varieties and styles within a language.

A major branch of linguistics since the second half of the 20th century, sociolinguistics is closely related to and can partly overlap with pragmatics, linguistic anthropology, and sociology of language, the latter focusing on the effect of language back on society. Sociolinguistics' historical interrelation with anthropology can be observed in studies of how language varieties differ between groups separated by social variables (e.g., ethnicity, religion, status, gender, level of education, age, etc.) or geographical barriers (a mountain range, a desert, a river, etc.). Such studies also examine how such differences in usage and in beliefs about usage produce and reflect social or socioeconomic classes. As the usage of a language varies from place to place, language usage also varies among social classes, and some sociolinguists study these sociolects.

Studies in the field of sociolinguistics use a variety of research methods including ethnography and participant observation, analysis of audio or video recordings of real life encounters or interviews with members of a population of interest. Some sociolinguists assess the realization of social and linguistic variables in the resulting speech corpus. Other research methods in sociolinguistics include matched-guise tests (in which listeners share their evaluations of linguistic features they hear), dialect surveys, and analysis of preexisting corpora.

== Sociolinguistics in history ==
=== Beginnings ===
The social aspects of language were in the modern sense first studied by Indian and Japanese linguists in the 1930s, and also by forerunners in Denmark and Switzerland around the turn of the 20th century, but none received much attention in the West until much later. The study of the social motivation of language change, on the other hand, has its foundation in the wave model of the late 19th century. The first attested use of the term sociolinguistics was by Thomas Callan Hodson in the title of his 1939 article "Sociolinguistics in India" published in Man in India.

Dialectology is an old field, and in the early 20th century, dialectologists such as Hans Kurath and Raven I. McDavid Jr. initiated large scale surveys of dialect regions in the U.S.

=== Western contributions ===
The study of sociolinguistics in the West was pioneered by linguists such as Charles A. Ferguson or William Labov in the US and Basil Bernstein in the UK. In the 1960s, William Stewart and Heinz Kloss introduced the basic concepts for the sociolinguistic theory of pluricentric languages, which describes how standard language varieties differ between nations, e.g. regional varieties of English versus pluricentric "English"; regional standards of German versus pluricentric "German"; Bosnian, Croatian, Montenegrin, and Serbian versus pluricentric "Serbo-Croatian". Dell Hymes, one of the founders of linguistic anthropology, is credited with developing an ethnography-based sociolinguistics and is the founder of the journal Language in Society. His focus on ethnography and communicative competence contributed to his development of the SPEAKING method: an acronym for setting, participants, ends, act sequence, keys, instrumentalities, norms, and genres that is widely recognized as a tool to analyze speech events in their cultural context.

== Applications ==
Sociolinguistics can be divided into subfields, which make use of different research methods, and have different goals. Dialectologists survey people through interviews, and compile maps. Ethnographers such as Dell Hymes and his students often live amongst the people they are studying. Conversation analysts such as Harvey Sacks and interactional sociolinguists such as John J. Gumperz record audio or video of natural encounters, and then analyze the tapes in detail. Sociolinguists tend to be aware of how the act of interviewing might affect the answers given.

Some sociolinguists study language on a national level among large populations to find out how language is used as a social institution. William Labov, a Harvard and Columbia University graduate, is often regarded as the founder of variationist sociolinguistics which focuses on the quantitative analysis of variation and change within languages, making sociolinguistics a scientific discipline.

For example, a sociolinguistics-based translation framework states that a linguistically appropriate translation cannot be wholly sufficient to achieve the communicative effect of the source language; the translation must also incorporate the social practices and cultural norms of the target language. To reveal social practices and cultural norms beyond lexical and syntactic levels, the framework includes empirical testing of the translation using methods such as cognitive interviewing with a sample population.

A commonly studied source of variation is regional dialects. Dialectology studies variations in language based primarily on geographic distribution and their associated features. Sociolinguists concerned with grammatical and phonological features that correspond to regional areas are often called dialectologists.

== Sociolinguistic interview ==
The sociolinguistic interview is the foundational method of collecting data for sociolinguistic studies, allowing the researcher to collect large amounts of speech from speakers of the language or dialect being studied. The interview takes the form of a long, loosely structured conversation between the researcher and the interview subject; the researcher's primary goal is to elicit the vernacular style of speech: the register associated with everyday casual conversation. This goal is complicated by the observer's paradox: the researcher is trying to elicit the style of speech that would be used if the interviewer were not present.

To that end, a variety of techniques may be used to reduce the subject's attention to the formality and artificiality of the interview setting. For example, the researcher may attempt to elicit narratives of memorable events from the subject's life, such as fights or near-death experiences; the subject's emotional involvement in telling the story is thought to distract their attention from the formality of the context. Some researchers interview multiple subjects together to allow them to converse more casually with one other than they would with the interviewer alone. The researcher may then study the effects of style-shifting on language by comparing a subject's speech style in more vernacular contexts, such as narratives of personal experience or conversation between subjects, with the more careful style produced when the subject is more attentive to the formal interview setting. The correlations of demographic features such as age, gender, and ethnicity with speech behavior may be studied by comparing the speech of different interview subjects.

== Fundamental concepts ==
While the study of sociolinguistics is very broad, there are a few fundamental concepts on which many sociolinguistic inquiries depend.

=== Speech community ===
Speech community is a concept in sociolinguistics that describes a distinct group of people who use language in a unique and mutually accepted way among themselves. This is sometimes referred to as a Sprechbund.

To be considered part of a speech community, one must have a communicative competence. That is, the speaker has the ability to use language in a way that is appropriate in the given situation. It is possible for a speaker to be communicatively competent in more than one language.

Demographic characteristics such as areas or locations have helped to create speech community boundaries in speech community concept. Those characteristics can assist exact descriptions of specific groups' communication patterns.

Speech communities can be members of a profession with a specialized jargon, distinct social groups like high school students or hip hop fans, or even tight-knit groups like families and friends. Members of speech communities will often develop slang or specialized jargon to serve the group's special purposes and priorities. This is evident in the use of lingo within sports teams.

Community of Practice allows for sociolinguistics to examine the relationship between socialization, competence, and identity. Since identity is a very complex structure, studying language socialization is a means to examine the micro-interactional level of practical activity (everyday activities). The learning of a language is greatly influenced by family, but it is supported by the larger local surroundings, such as school, sports teams, or religion. Speech communities may exist within a larger community of practice.

=== High-prestige and low-prestige varieties ===
Crucial to sociolinguistic analysis is the concept of prestige; certain speech habits are assigned a positive or a negative value, which is then applied to the speaker. This can operate on many levels. It can be realized on the level of the individual sound/phoneme, as Labov discovered in investigating pronunciation of the post-vocalic /r/ in the Northeastern United States, or on the macro scale of language choice, as is realized in the various diglossia that exist throughout the world, with the one between Swiss German and High German being perhaps most well known. An important implication of the sociolinguistic theory is that speakers 'choose' a variety when making a speech act, whether consciously or subconsciously.

The terms acrolectal (high) and basilectal (low) are also used to distinguish between a more standard dialect and a dialect of less prestige.

It is generally assumed that non-standard language is low-prestige language. However, in certain groups, such as traditional working-class neighborhoods, standard language may be considered undesirable in many contexts because the working-class dialect is generally considered a powerful in-group marker. Historically, humans tend to favor those who look and sound like them, and the use of nonstandard varieties (even exaggeratedly so) expresses neighborhood pride and group and class solidarity. The desirable social value associated with the use of non-standard language is known as covert prestige. There will thus be a considerable difference in use of non-standard varieties when going to the pub or having a neighborhood barbecue compared to going to the bank. One is a relaxed setting, likely with familiar people, and the other has a business aspect to it in which one feels the need to be more professional.

=== Social network ===
Understanding language in society means that one also has to understand the social networks in which language is embedded. A social network is another way of describing a particular speech community in terms of relations between individual members in a community. A network could be loose or tight depending on how members interact with each other. For instance, an office or factory may be considered a tight community because all members interact with each other. A large course with 100+ students would be a looser community because students may only interact with the instructor and maybe 1–2 other students. A multiplex community is one in which members have multiple relationships with each other. For instance, in some neighborhoods, members may live on the same street, work for the same employer and even intermarry.

The looseness or tightness of a social network may affect speech patterns adopted by a speaker. For instance, Sylvie Dubois and Barbara Horvath found that speakers in one Cajun Louisiana community were more likely to pronounce English "th" [θ] as [t] (or [ð] as [d]) if they participated in a relatively dense social network (i.e. had strong local ties and interacted with many other speakers in the community), and less likely if their networks were looser (i.e. fewer local ties).

A social network may apply to the macro level of a country or a city, but also to the interpersonal level of neighborhoods or a single family. Recently, social networks have been formed by the Internet through online chat rooms, Facebook groups, organizations, and online dating services.

=== Comparison of frameworks ===
The three frameworks—speech community, social network, and community of practice—represent successive attempts to capture the relationship between social structure and linguistic variation, each addressing limitations of its predecessors.

The speech community model, developed from the work of Labov and others, groups speakers by shared norms of evaluation: members of a speech community agree on which variants are prestigious or stigmatised, even if they do not all use the same variants themselves. The concept is useful for large-scale survey methods such as rapid anonymous surveys, but it assumes a stable, geographically bounded group with internally shared norms—an assumption that has been challenged by findings that communities are often dynamic and overlapping. Methodologies based on the speech community concept, such as rapid anonymous surveys, typically require a two-step process: first identifying who shares a set of norms, then studying the variation within that group—a sequence complicated by the fact that communities may shift membership over time. The framework has also been criticised for its focus on shared norms at the expense of individual outliers within a community.

The social network approach shifts the unit of analysis from the group to the individual. A speaker's network is defined by the density and multiplexity of their personal ties, and these structural properties have been shown to correlate with linguistic behaviour: denser, more multiplex networks tend to reinforce local vernacular norms, while looser networks facilitate the spread of innovations. The availability of digital communication data has expanded the scope of social network analysis in sociolinguistics, though the approach has been criticised for foregrounding network structure at the expense of shared meaning and social practice.

The community of practice (CofP), introduced to sociolinguistics by Eckert and McConnell-Ginet (1992), defines a group by mutual engagement in a shared enterprise that gives rise to a repertoire of practices—linguistic and otherwise. Unlike the speech community, a CofP need not be geographically bounded; unlike social network analysis, it foregrounds qualitative, ethnographic investigation of how practices emerge within the group rather than being imposed from outside. The CofP approach also gives speakers a more active role in the research process through ethnographic methods such as extended interviews with individuals and groups. One advantage of this detailed approach is that researchers can hope to distinguish whether a practice has emerged within the community itself or originated externally but became recognisable within it—a distinction that the speech community framework, with its emphasis on pre-existing shared norms, does not readily capture. Eckert's ethnographic study of a Detroit-area high school demonstrated how adolescent social categories ("jocks" and "burnouts") developed distinct vowel systems as part of broader identity practices.

== Differences according to class ==
Sociolinguistics as a field distinct from dialectology was pioneered through the study of language variation in urban areas. Whereas dialectology studies the geographic distribution of language variation, sociolinguistics focuses on other sources of variation, among them class. Class and occupation are among the most important linguistic markers found in society. One of the fundamental findings of sociolinguistics, which has been hard to disprove, is that class and language variety are related. Members of the working class tend to speak less of what is deemed standard language, while the lower, middle, and upper middle class will, in turn, speak closer to the standard. However, the upper class, even members of the upper middle class, may often speak 'less' standard than the middle class. This is because not only class but class aspirations, are important. One may speak differently or cover up an undesirable accent to appear to have a different social status and fit in better with either those around them, or how they wish to be perceived.

=== Class aspiration ===
Studies, such as those by William Labov in the 1960s, have shown that social aspirations influence speech patterns. This is also true of class aspirations. In the process of wishing to be associated with a certain class (usually the upper class and upper middle class) people who are moving in that direction socio-economically may adjust their speech patterns to sound like them. However, not being native upper-class speakers, they often hypercorrect, which involves overcorrecting their speech to the point of introducing new errors. The same is true for individuals moving down in socio-economic status.

In any contact situation, there is a power dynamic, be it a teacher-student or employee-customer situation. This power dynamic results in a hierarchical differentiation between languages.

Non-standard dialect (associated with lower classes)	Standard dialect (associated with higher classes)
It looks like it ain't gonna rain today.	It looks as if it isn't going to rain today.
You give it to me yesterday.	You gave it to me yesterday.
Y'gotta do it the right way.	You have to do it the right way.

=== Social language codes ===
Basil Bernstein, a well-known British sociolinguist, devised in his book, Elaborated and restricted codes: their social origins and some consequences, a method for categorizing language codes according to variable emphases on verbal and extraverbal communication. He claimed that factors like family orientation, social control, verbal feedback, and possibly social class contributed to the development of the two codes: elaborated and restricted.

==== Restricted code ====
According to Basil Bernstein, the restricted code exemplified the predominance of extraverbal communication, with an emphasis on interpersonal connection over individual expression. His theory places the code within environments that operate according to established social structures that predetermine the roles of their members in which the commonality of interests and intents from a shared local identity creates a predictability of discrete intent and therefore a simplification of verbal utterances. Such environments may include military, religious, and legal atmospheres; criminal and prison subcultures; long-term married relationships; and friendships between children.

The strong bonds between speakers often renders explicit verbal communication unnecessary and individual expression irrelevant. However, simplification is not a sign of a lack of intelligence or complexity within the code; rather, communication is performed more through extraverbal means (facial expression, touch, etc.) in order to affirm the speakers' bond. Bernstein notes the example of a young man asking a stranger to dance since there is an established manner of asking, yet communication is performed through physical graces and the exchange of glances.

As such, implied meaning plays a greater role in this code than in the elaborated code. Restricted code also operates to unify speakers and foster solidarity.

==== Elaborated code ====
Basil Bernstein defined 'elaborated code' according to its emphasis on verbal communication over extraverbal. This code is typical in environments where a variety of social roles are available to the individual, to be chosen based upon disposition and temperament. Most of the time, speakers of elaborated code use a broader lexicon and demonstrate less syntactic predictability than speakers of restricted code. The lack of predetermined structure and solidarity requires explicit verbal communication of discrete intent by the individual to achieve educational and career success.

Bernstein notes with caution the association of the code with upper classes (while restricted code is associated with lower classes) since the abundance of available resources allows persons to choose their social roles. He warns, however, that studies associating the codes with separate social classes used small samples and were subject to significant variation.

He also asserts that elaborated code originates from differences in social context, rather than intellectual advantages. As such, elaborated code differs from restricted code according to the context-based emphasis on individual advancement over assertion of social/community ties.

==== The codes and child development ====
Bernstein explains language development according to the two codes in light of their fundamentally different values. For instance, a child exposed solely to restricted code learns extraverbal communication over verbal, and therefore may have a less extensive vocabulary than a child raised with exposure to both codes. While there is no inherent lack of value to restricted code, a child without exposure to elaborated code may encounter difficulties upon entering formal education, in which standard, clear verbal communication and comprehension is necessary for learning and effective interaction both with instructors and other students from differing backgrounds. As such, it may be beneficial for children who have been exposed solely to restricted code to enter pre-school training in elaborated code in order to acquire a manner of speaking that is considered appropriate and widely comprehensible within the education environment.

Additionally, Bernstein notes several studies in language development according to social class. In 1963, the Committee for Higher Education conducted a study on verbal IQ that showed a deterioration in individuals from lower working classes ages 8–11 and 11–15 years in comparison to those from middle classes (having been exposed to both restricted and elaborated codes). Additionally, studies by Bernstein, Venables, and Ravenette, as well as a 1958 Education Council report, show a relative lack of success on verbal tasks in comparison to extraverbal in children from lower working classes (having been exposed solely to restricted code).

===== Contradictions =====
The idea of these social language codes from Bernstein contrast with famous linguist Noam Chomsky's ideas. Chomsky, deemed the "father of modern linguistics", argues that there is a universal grammar, meaning that humans are born with an innate capacity for linguistic skills like sentence-building. This theory has been criticized by several scholars of linguistic backgrounds because of the lack of proven evolutionary feasibility and the fact that different languages do not have universal characteristics.

== Sociolinguistic variation ==
The study of language variation is concerned with social constraints determining language in its contextual environment. The variations will determine some of the aspects of language like the sound, grammar, and tone in which people speak, and even non-verbal cues. Code-switching is the term given to the use of different varieties of language depending on the social situation. This is commonly used among the African-American population in the United States. There are several different types of age-based variation one may see within a population as well such as age range, age-graded variation, and indications of linguistic change in progress. The use of slang can be a variation based on age. Younger people are more likely to recognize and use today's slang while older generations may not recognize new slang, but might use slang from when they were younger.

Variation may also be associated with gender, as men and women, on average, tend to use slightly different language styles. These differences are typically quantitative rather than qualitative. In other words, while women may use certain speaking styles more frequently than men, the distinction is comparable to height differences between the sexes—on average, men are taller than women, yet some women are taller than some men. Similar variations in speech patterns include differences in pitch, tone, speech fillers, interruptions, and the use of euphemisms, etc.

These gender-based differences in communication extend beyond face-to-face interactions and are also evident in digital spaces. Despite the continuous evolution of social media platforms, cultural and societal norms continue to shape online interactions. For instance, men and women often adopt different non-verbal cues and roles in virtual conversations. However, when it comes to fundamental aspects of communication—such as spoken language, active listening, providing feedback, understanding context, selecting communication methods, and managing conflicts—their approaches tend to be more similar than different.

Beyond these stylistic differences, research suggests that gendered language patterns are also influenced by social expectations and power dynamics. Women, for instance, are more likely to use hedging expressions (e.g., "I think" or "perhaps") and tag questions ("isn't it?") to soften their statements and promote conversational cooperation. Meanwhile, men tend to adopt more assertive and direct speech patterns, reflecting broader societal norms that associate masculinity with dominance and authority.

Variation in language can also come from ethnicity, economic status, level of education, etc.

== See also ==
- Abstand language
- Anthropological linguistics
- Audience design
- Ausbausprache
- Axiom of categoricity
- Conversation Analysis
- Discourse analysis
- Discursive psychology
- Folk linguistics
- In-group
- Interactional sociolinguistics
- Jargon
- Language death
- Language ideology
- Language planning
- Language policy
- Language secessionism
- Linguistic landscape
- Linguistic marketplace
- Metapragmatics
- Mutual intelligibility
- Raciolinguistics
- Real-time sociolinguistics
- Sociocultural linguistics
- Sociohistorical linguistics
- Sociolinguistics of sign languages
- Sociology of language
- Style-shifting
- T–V distinction
- Variation (linguistics)
- Category:Sociolinguists
