= Communicative competence =

Broad internalized communicative knowledge

The concept of communicative competence, as developed in linguistics, originated in response to perceived inadequacy of the notion of linguistic competence. That is, communicative competence encompasses a language user's grammatical knowledge of syntax, morphology, phonology and the like, but reconceives this knowledge as a functional, social understanding of how and when to use utterances appropriately.

Communicative language teaching is a pedagogical application of communicative competence.

The understanding of communicative competence has been influenced by the field of pragmatics and the philosophy of language, including work on speech acts.

== Origin ==
The term was coined by Dell Hymes in 1966, reacting against the perceived inadequacy of Noam Chomsky's (1965) distinction between linguistic competence and performance. To address Chomsky's abstract notion of competence, Hymes undertook ethnographic exploration of communicative competence that included "communicative form and function in integral relation to each other". The approach pioneered by Hymes is now known as the ethnography of communication.

== Applications ==
The notion of communicative competence is one of the theories that underlies the communicative approach to foreign language teaching. At least three core models exist. The first and most widely used is Canale and Swain's model and the later iteration by Canale. In a second model, sociocultural content is more precisely specified by Celce-Murcia, Dornyei, and Thurrell in 1995. For their part, they saw communicative competence as including linguistic competence, strategic competence, sociocultural competence, actional competence, and discourse competence. A third model widely in use in federal language training in Canada is Bachman and Palmer's model.

== Bibliography ==
- Bachman, Lyle; Palmer, Adrian (2010). Language Assessment in Practice. Oxford: Oxford University Press. ISBN 9780194422932.
- Canale, Michael; Swain, Merrill (1980). "Theoretical bases of communicative approaches to second language teaching and testing". Applied Linguistics. 1 (1): 1–47. doi:10.1093/applin/1.1.1 (inactive 11 July 2025). hdl:11059/14798.
- Canale, Michael (1983). "From communicative competence to communicative language pedagogy". Language and Communication. 1 (1): 1–47.
- Celce-Murcia, Marianne; Dornyei, Zoltán; Thurrell, Sarah (1995). "Communicative competence: A pedagogically motivated model with content specifications". Issues in Applied Linguistics. 6 (2): 5–35. doi:10.5070/L462005216.
- Chomsky, Noam (1965). Aspects of the Theory of Syntax. Cambridge: M.I.T. Press. ISBN 9780262530071.
- Hymes, Dell (1964), "Toward ethnographies of communication", American Anthropologist, 66 (6 part 2): 1–34, doi:10.1525/aa.1964.66.suppl_3.02a00010, ISSN 0002-7294
- Hymes, Dell (1966). "Two types of linguistic relativity". In Bright, W. (ed.). Sociolinguistics. The Hague: Mouton. pp. 114–158. OCLC 2164408.
- Leung (2005). "Convivial communication: recontextualizing communicative competence". International Journal of Applied Linguistics. 15 (2): 119–144. doi:10.1111/j.1473-4192.2005.00084.x. ISSN 0802-6106.
