= Susan Speer =

British psychologist and psychologist

- Other name: Sue Speer

Academic background
- Education: Loughborough University

Academic work
- Institutions: University of Manchester
- Main interests: Psychology
- Website: University of Manchester

Susan "Sue" Speer C.Psychol, FHEA is a senior lecturer at the School of Psychological Sciences, University of Manchester.

From 2005 to 2006 Speer was an ESRC-SSRC collaborative visiting fellow in the department of sociology at the University of California at Los Angeles (UCLA).

== Selected bibliography ==
=== Forthcoming ===
- Speer, Susan A.; Stokoe, Elizabeth. Flirting: Designedly ambiguous actions in interpersonal attraction.

=== Books ===
- Speer, Susan (2005). Gender talk: feminism, discourse and conversation analysis. London New York: Routledge. ISBN 9780415246446.
- Speer, Susan A.; Stokoe, Elizabeth (2011). Conversation and gender. Cambridge New York: Cambridge University Press. ISBN 9780521696036.

=== Chapters in books ===
- Speer, Susan A.; Potter, Jonathan (2002), "From performatives to practices: Judith Butler, discursive psychology, and the management of heterosexist talk", in McIlvenny, Paul (ed.), Talking gender and sexuality, Amsterdam Philadelphia: John Benjamins, pp. 151–180, ISBN 9789027251145.
- Speer, Susan A.; Potter, Jonathan (2007), "The management of heterosexist talk: Conversational resources and prejudiced claims", in Potter, Jonathan (ed.), Discourse and psychology: Volume II, SAGE Benchmarks in Psychology, Los Angeles: SAGE, ISBN 9781412934039.
- Speer, Susan A.; Green, Richard (2010), "On passing: The interactional organization of appearance attributions in the psychiatric assessment of transsexual patients", in Clarke, Victoria; Peel, Elizabeth (eds.), Out in psychology: Lesbian, gay, bisexual, trans and queer psychology: an introduction, Cambridge New York: Cambridge University Press, pp. 335–368, ISBN 9780521700184.
- Speer, Susan A.; Parsons, Ceri (2007), ""Suppose it wasn't possible for you to go any further with treatment, what would you do?" Hypothetical questions in interactions between psychiatrists and transsexual patients", in Hepburn, Alexa; Wiggins, Sally (eds.), Discursive research in practice: new approaches to psychology and interaction, Cambridge New York: Cambridge University Press, pp. 182–199, ISBN 9780521614092.
- Speer, Susan A. (2008), "Natural and contrived data", in Brannen, Julia; Alasuutari, Pertti; Bickman, Leonard (eds.), The SAGE handbook of social research methods, Los Angeles, California London: SAGE, pp. 290–312, ISBN 9781848607309.
- Speer, Susan A.; Hutchby, Ian (2008), "From ethics to analytics: Aspects of participants orientations to the presence and relevance of recording devices", in Hutchby, Ian (ed.), Methods in language and social interaction (Volume IV: Embodiment, modality and mediation), SAGE Benchmarks in Social Research Methods, Los Angeles London: Sage, ISBN 9781412935555.
- Speer, Susan A. (2009), "Passing as a transsexual woman in the gender identity clinic", in Wetherell, Margaret (ed.), Theorizing identities and social action, Identity Studies in the Social Sciences, Houndmills, Basingstoke, Hampshire England New York: Palgrave Macmillan, pp. 116–138, ISBN 9780230580886.
- Speer, Susan A.; Hutchby, Ian (2009), "From ethics to analytics: Aspects of participants orientations to the presence and relevance of recording devices", in Fielding, Nigel G. (ed.), Interviewing II (Volume I–IV), SAGE Benchmarks in Social Research Methods, London Thousand Oaks, California: Sage, ISBN 9781412928670.

With a response by Hammersley, Martyn: 'Analytics' are no substitute for methodology: A response to Speer and Hutchby

- Speer, Susan A. (2010), "Section II Understanding social marginalisation in LGBTQ lives: Trans and queer (Box 4.1, Key researcher: Susan Speer on why I study trans)", in Clarke, Victoria; Ellis, Sonja J.; Peel, Elizabeth; et al. (eds.), Lesbian, gay, bisexual, trans and queer psychology: an introduction, Cambridge New York: Cambridge University Press, pp. 89–90, ISBN 9780521700184.
- Speer, Susan A. (2010), "Pursuing views and testing commitments: Hypothetical questions in the psychiatric assessment of transsexual patients", in Freed, Alice; Ehrlich, Susan (eds.), Why do you ask? the function of questions in institutional discourse, Oxford New York: Oxford University Press, pp. 133–158, ISBN 9780195306903.
- Speer, Susan A.; Stokoe, Elizabeth (2011), "An introduction to conversation and gender", in Speer, Susan A.; Stokoe, Elizabeth (eds.), Conversation and gender, Cambridge New York: Cambridge University Press, pp. 1–27, ISBN 9780521696036.
- Speer, Susan A. (2011), "On the role of reported, third party compliments in passing as a 'real' woman", in Speer, Susan A.; Stokoe, Elizabeth (eds.), Conversation and gender, Cambridge New York: Cambridge University Press, pp. 155–182, ISBN 9780521696036.
- Speer, Susan A.; Goodman, Simon (2015), "Part 1: Epistemology and method interpretative repertoires: Natural and contrived data", in Tileagă, Cristian; Stokoe, Elizabeth (eds.), Discursive psychology: classic and contemporary issues, Oxford New York: Routledge, ISBN 9780415721608.
- Speer, Susan A. (2015), "Sexist discourse", in Tracy, Karen; Ilie, Cornelia; Sandel, Todd (eds.), The International Encyclopedia of language and social interaction, Malden, Massachusetts: International Communication Association and Wiley-Blackwell, ISBN 9781118611104.

=== Journal articles ===
- Speer, Susan A. (November 1999). "Feminism and conversation analysis: An oxymoron?". Feminism & Psychology. 9 (4): 471–478. doi:10.1177/0959353599009004013. S2CID 143558526.
- Speer, Susan A.; Potter, Jonathan (October 2000). "The management of heterosexist talk: conversational resources and prejudiced claims". Discourse & Society. 11 (4): 543–572. doi:10.1177/0957926500011004005. S2CID 141983471.
- Speer, Susan A. (November 2000). "Let's get real? Feminism, constructionism and the realism/relativism debate". Feminism & Psychology. 10 (4): 519–530. doi:10.1177/0959353500010004014. S2CID 145016374.
- Speer, Susan A. (February 2001). "Reconsidering the concept of hegemonic masculinity: Discursive psychology, conversation analysis and participants' orientations". Feminism & Psychology. 11 (1): 107–135. doi:10.1177/0959353501011001006. S2CID 145673578.

With a response: Edley, Nigel (February 2001). "Conversation analysis, discursive psychology and the study of ideology: A response to Susan Speer" (PDF). Feminism & Psychology. 11 (1): 136–140. doi:10.1177/0959353501011001007. S2CID 144581261.

Rejoinder: Speer, Susan A. (February 2001). "Participants' orientations, ideology and the ontological status of hegemonic masculinity: A rejoinder to Nigel Edley". Feminism & Psychology. 11 (1): 141–144. doi:10.1177/0959353501011001008. S2CID 17569624.

- Speer, Susan A. (March 2001). "Sports media and gender inequality". Body & Society. 7 (1): 109–114. doi:10.1177/1357034X01007001006. S2CID 144368737.
- Speer, Susan A. (August 2002). "'Natural' and 'contrived' data: a sustainable distinction?". Discourse Studies. 4 (4): 511–525. doi:10.1177/14614456020040040601. S2CID 145705373.

With a response: Tenhave, Paul (August 2002). "Ontology or methodology? Comments on Speer's 'natural' and 'contrived' data: a sustainable distinction?". Discourse Studies. 4 (4): 527–530. doi:10.1177/14614456020040040701. S2CID 144909877.
With a response: Lynch, Michael (August 2002). "From naturally occurring data to naturally organized ordinary activities: comment on Speer". Discourse Studies. 4 (4): 531–537. doi:10.1177/14614456020040040801. S2CID 144475763.
With a response: Potter, Jonathan (August 2002). "Two kinds of natural" (PDF). Discourse Studies. 4 (4): 539–542. doi:10.1177/14614456020040040901. S2CID 143700255.

Rejoinder: Speer, Susan A. (August 2002). "Transcending the 'natural'/'contrived' distinction: a rejoinder to ten Have, Lynch and Potter". Discourse Studies. 4 (4): 543–548. doi:10.1177/14614456020040041001. S2CID 144543307.

- Speer, Susan A. (August 2002). "Sexist talk: gender categories, participants' orientations and irony". Journal of Sociolinguistics. 6 (3): 347–377. doi:10.1111/1467-9481.00192.
- Speer, Susan A. (November 2002). "What can conversation analysis contribute to feminist methodology? Putting reflexivity into practice". Discourse & Society. 13 (6): 783–803. doi:10.1177/0957926502013006757. S2CID 145754119.
- Speer, Susan A.; Hutchby, Ian (May 2003). "From ethics to analytics: Aspects of participants orientations to the presence and relevance of recording devices". Sociology. 37 (2): 315–337. doi:10.1177/0038038503037002006. hdl:2381/14096. S2CID 62463624.

With a response: Hammersley, Martyn (May 2003). "'Analytics' are no substitute for methodology: A response to Speer and Hutchby". Sociology. 37 (2): 339–351. doi:10.1177/0038038503037002007. S2CID 145494569.

Rejoinder: Speer, Susan A.; Hutchby, Ian (May 2003). "Methodology needs analytics: A rejoinder to Martyn Hammersley". Sociology. 37 (2): 353–359. doi:10.1177/0038038503037002008. S2CID 145625028.

- Speer, Susan A. (February 2005). "The interactional organization of the gender attribution process". Sociology. 39 (1): 67–87. doi:10.1177/0038038505049002. S2CID 144490354.
- Speer, Susan A.; Parsons, Ceri (November 2006). "Gatekeeping gender: some features of the use of hypothetical questions in the psychiatric assessment of transsexual patients". Discourse & Society. 17 (6): 785–812. doi:10.1177/0957926506068433. S2CID 145502573.
- Speer, Susan A. (February 2007). "On recruiting conversation analysis for critical realist purposes". Theory & Psychology. 17 (1): 125–135. doi:10.1177/0959354307073155. S2CID 143705978.

A response to: Sims-Schouten, Wendy; Riley, Sarah C.E.; Willig, Carla (February 2007). "Critical realism in discourse analysis: A presentation of a systematic method of analysis using women's talk of motherhood, childcare and female employment as an example". Theory & Psychology. 17 (1): 101–124. doi:10.1177/0959354307073153. S2CID 145646326.

- Speer, Susan A.; Goodman, Simon (August 2007). "Category use in the construction of asylum seekers". Critical Discourse Studies. 4 (2): 165–185. doi:10.1080/17405900701464832. S2CID 144338849.
- Speer, Susan A. (March 2012). "The interactional organization of self-praise: Epistemics, preference organization, and implications for identity tesearch". Social Psychology Quarterly. 75 (1): 52–79. doi:10.1177/0190272511432939. S2CID 145650820.
- Speer, Susan A. (October 2012). "Hypothetical questions: A comparative analysis and implications for "applied" versus "basic" conversation analysis". Research on Language & Social Interaction. 45 (4): 352–374. doi:10.1080/08351813.2012.724987. S2CID 143492423.
- Speer, Susan A. (October 2012). "'Feminist' conversation analysis: Who needs it?". Qualitative Research in Psychology. 9 (4): 292–297. doi:10.1080/14780887.2011.635132. S2CID 142734501.

A response to: Whelan, Pauline (October 2012). "Oxymoronic and sociologically monstrous? Feminist conversation analysis". Qualitative Research in Psychology. 9 (4): 279–291. doi:10.1080/14780887.2011.634360. S2CID 142647421.

Rejoinder: Whelan, Pauline (October 2012). "Glossing conversation analysis with feminism?". Qualitative Research in Psychology. 9 (4): 303–313. doi:10.1080/14780887.2011.634362. S2CID 142529815.

- Speer, Susan A. (December 2012). "Arsène didn't see it: Coaching, research and the promise of a discursive psychology: A commentary" (PDF). International Journal of Sports Science and Coaching. 7 (4): 635–637. doi:10.1260/1747-9541.7.4.615. S2CID 73627186.

A response to: Miller, Paul K. (December 2012). "Arsène didn't see it: Coaching, research and the promise of a discursive psychology" (PDF). International Journal of Sports Science and Coaching. 7 (4): 615–635. doi:10.1260/1747-9541.7.4.615. S2CID 73627186. Pdf of pp. 615–646.

- Speer, Susan A.; Ranjbar, Vania (2013). "Revictimization and recovery from sexual assault: Implications for health professionals". Violence & Victims. 28 (2): 274–287. doi:10.1891/0886-6708.11-00144. PMID 23763112. S2CID 33640138.
- Speer, Susan A.; McPhillips, Rebecca (June 2013). "Patients' perspectives on psychiatric consultations in the Gender Identity Clinic: Implications for patient-centered communication". Patient Education and Counseling. 91 (3): 385–391. doi:10.1016/j.pec.2012.12.009. PMID 23369376.
- Speer, Susan A. (November 2013). "Talking about sex with patients in the Gender Identity Clinic: Implications for training and practice". Health (London). 17 (6): 622–639. doi:10.1177/1363459312472085. PMID 23467897. S2CID 26310948.
- Speer, Susan A.; Stokoe, Elizabeth (March 2014). "Ethics in action: Consent-gaining interactions and implications for research practice" (PDF). British Journal of Social Psychology. 53 (1): 54–73. doi:10.1111/bjso.12009. PMID 23106687. S2CID 813294.
- Speer, Susan A. (June 2014). "Reflecting on the ethics and politics of collecting interactional data: implications for training and practice" (PDF). Human Studies. 37 (2): 279–286. doi:10.1007/s10746-014-9310-8. S2CID 143589766.
