= Rosalind Gill =

British sociologist and author (born 1963)

Rosalind Gill FBA
- Born: Rosalind Clair Gill; 22 April 1963 (age 63)
- Other name: Ros Gill

Academic background
- Education: University of Exeter; Loughborough University
- Doctoral advisor: Michael Billig
- Influences: Stuart Hall

Academic work
- Discipline: Sociology
- School or tradition: Feminism
- Institutions: Goldsmiths' College, London; London School of Economics; King's College, London; City, University of London
- Main interests: Cultural and creative work; media and popular culture; discursive, narrative, visual and psychosocial approaches; gender and sexuality

Rosalind Clair Gill (born 1963) is a British sociologist and feminist cultural theorist. She is currently Professor of Social and Cultural Analysis at City, University of London. Gill is author or editor of ten books, and numerous articles and chapters, and her work has been translated into Chinese, German, Portuguese, Spanish and Turkish.

== Biography ==
Gill was born on 22 April 1963, the daughter of Janet and Michael Gill, whom she describes as left-wing and politically engaged parents. In an interview she says she grew up to be "a young, politically active, left-wing person" with a particular interest in "how culture, and ideology gets inside us and shapes us."

She received her doctorate, which was concerned with new racism and new sexism in British pop radio, in social psychology from the Discourse and Rhetoric Group (DARG), Loughborough University in 1991. In an interview, she has identified Michael Billig (her PhD supervisor) and Stuart Hall as major influences and, together with Christina Scharff, she dedicated the book New Femininities: Postfeminism, Neoliberalism and Subjectivity to Angela McRobbie. Gill's work is interdisciplinary, and she has worked in departments of Psychology, Sociology, Media and Communications, and Gender Studies. Based mainly in London, she has held posts at Goldsmiths College, King's College and the LSE, where she was the first tenured member of staff in the Gender Institute (1997–2007). She took up her position at City, University of London, in 2013.

Gill was elected a Fellow of the British Academy in 2023.

== Research ==
Gill is known for her research interests in gender and sexuality, media and new technologies, the cultural and creative industries, and work and labour. Substantively her work has made major contributions to debates about postfeminism and neoliberalism; the persistence and dynamics of inequality; constructions of sex, sexuality and intimacy; and changing experiences of work in creative and academic fields. Her work is shaped by her interdisciplinary background, located between sociology, psychology, media and communications, and gender and sexuality studies. It is animated by psychosocial questions about power, inequality and the relationship between culture and subjectivity. She also has a long-standing interest in methodology and the research process, and has authored books and articles about discourse analysis, reflexivity, and secrets and silences in research.

=== Postfeminism ===
One of Gill's most significant theoretical contributions is her discussion of postfeminism, which she claims is "one of the most important and contested terms in the lexicon of feminist cultural analysis". She argues that though the term has been used by scholars for decades there is still "no agreement among scholars about what postfeminism means. The term is used variously and contradictorily to signal a theoretical position, a type of feminism after the Second Wave, or a regressive political stance".

In a highly cited article in European Journal of Cultural Studies (ECJS) in 2007, Gill argued that postfeminism should be thought of as a contemporary “sensibility”, shaped by neoliberalism and “by stark and continuing inequalities” related to gender race and class. Elements of this sensibility include:

- An obsessive preoccupation with the body
- The shift from women being portrayed as submissive, passive objects, to being portrayed as active, desiring sexual subjects
- The preeminence of notions of choice, 'being oneself' and 'pleasing oneself'
- A focus on self-surveillance and discipline
- A makeover paradigm
- The reassertion of sexual difference
- Media messages that are characterised by irony and knowingness

This framing of postfeminism has been very influential, with well over 1000 academic citations. In 2017, in the 20th anniversary issue of EJCS, Gill was asked to reflect on the piece and developed her argument in three important directions: emphasising the significance of intersectional analyses of postfeminist culture; highlighting the “psychic life” of postfeminism; and setting out directions for considering the affective dimensions of postfeminism, organised around confidence, resilience, positive thinking and “inspiration”. In another significant intervention in the journal Feminist Media Studies in 2016 Gill explored the status of postfeminism in a moment characterised by both a resurgence of feminist activism and a heightened popular misogyny, and defended the continued relevance of the term to signify an object of critique.

=== New sexism and the dynamics of discrimination ===
Gill's work has also made a contribution to debates about how discrimination changes. In her Ph.D. research on British broadcasting, she built on analyses of new racism, and documented new forms of sexism. The term was coined to speak to the way that patterns of discrimination were taking new forms in a cultural context marked by more egalitarian values. In later work she looked at other media environments that explicitly marked themselves as ‘cool, creative and egalitarian’ showing the novel forms that sexism took in such sites. In a 2014 article in Social Politics she developed the notion that in seemingly egalitarian workplaces inequality becomes “unspeakable” and perhaps even unintelligible. This work challenges debates centred on maternity as the primary reason for women's underrepresentation in cultural and creative fields, and pointed to the need to explore the flexibility and dynamism of sexism as a set of practices.

=== Sex, "sexualisation" and intimacy ===
Gill has been a major contributor to debates about the alleged "sexualisation of culture", with a perspective she describes as “sex positive but anti-sexism”. She was one of the organisers of a significant ESRC seminar series titled Pornified? Complicating the debates about the sexualisation of culture. This brought together artists, academics, policymakers and activists on different sides of the “sexualisation wars” divide. Gill consistently argued for the need to dialogue across differences and to think critically about the cultural processes gathered under the heading “sexualisation” with greater attention to specificities of power and identity. In an article in Sexualities she called for intersectional complications, arguing there is no “one size fits all” kind of sexualisation that does not vary by gender, sexuality, race, class, age etc. Gill's research has included a large-scale qualitative study of men's experiences of a visual culture increasingly dominated by idealised representations of the male body. She has also looked critically at the commercial “Love Your Body” trend and the packaging of “sexy” images through tropes of empowerment.

In 2012, Rosalind Gill worked with Jessica Ringrose, Sonia Livingstone and Laura Harvey on and NSPCC-funded research project about “sexting”, focused on listening to young people's experiences of mobile communications and image sharing. The research was published as a report, several articles, and was also used as the basis of a play titled Sket, written by Maya Sondhi, which premiered at London's Park Theatre in 2016, directed by Prav MJ.

The representation of sex and sexuality remain key interests and Gill's 2018 monograph, Mediated Intimacy, co-written with Meg-John Barker and Laura Harvey, argues that media are our biggest source of information about sex and relationships, and charts the representation of what is depicted as “normal”, and constructions of consent, desire, pleasure and work.

=== Work and labour ===
The experience of work in neoliberal societies represents another key focus for Gill. She has conducted extensive empirical research in “creative” occupations including broadcasting, advertising and web design. Her work has made important contributions to theorising both precariousness and inequality in these settings. Her co-edited collections Theorising Cultural Work (with Mark Banks and Stephanie Taylor) and Gender and Creative Labour (with Bridget Conor and Stephanie Taylor) pull together these arguments. Gill is also co-editor, with Ursula Huws, of Palgrave's Dynamics of Virtual Work series, which came out of an EU COST grant of the same name. In 2008 Gill co-edited a special issue of Theory, Culture & Society about work in the cultural and creative industries, and was author of an influential article about immaterial labour and precarity.

Academic work is a further interest, exemplified by Gill's much circulated essay "The Hidden Injuries of the Neoliberal University", and several subsequent articles. Gill's contribution has been to move beyond programmatic accounts of the “corporate university” or “new public management” and to explore the lived experience of working cultures marked by increasing precariousness, time pressure, and audit.

== Engagement and influence ==
Gill has received funding from and worked on projects commissioned by the Arts Council, the Arts and Humanities Research Council (AHRC), The British Academy (BA), The Economic and Social Research Council (ESRC), the European Commission and the United Nations (both UNESCO and the UNCSW).

Gill has also worked with a range of governmental, non-governmental and activist bodies. She serves on several editorial boards including Feminist Media Studies; Theory, Culture & Society; Communication, Culture and Critique; Feminism & Psychology; Psychology and Sexuality; Australian Feminist Studies; and International Journal of Media and Cultural Politics. Besides the contribution of her own research, Gill's influence has also been felt through her teaching and extensive PhD supervision. Many former PhD students have gone on to have successful academic careers.

== Work in progress ==
Gill is currently writing a book for Duke University press that develops her work with Shani Orgad on “The Confidence Cult”. She is also working on a critical collection for Palgrave interrogating “creative hubs”. This partly emerges from the AHRC award Creativeworks London. Finally, she is completing a monograph about postfeminism/gendered neoliberalism for Polity Press.

Additionally, she is developing research projects about academia, dating apps, and machine vision of the body. In an interview in Open Democracy she explains that the latter develops from work about beauty apps and surveillance.

== Selected publications ==
=== Journal articles ===
- Gill, Rosalind (1993). "Ideology, gender and popular radio: A discourse analytic approach". Innovation: The European Journal of Social Science Research. 6 (3): 323–339. doi:10.1080/13511610.1993.9968359.
- Gill, Rosalind (2002). "Cool, creative and egalitarian? Exploring gender in project-based new media work in Euro". Information, Communication & Society. 5 (1): 70–89. doi:10.1080/13691180110117668. S2CID 144395019.
- Gill, Rosalind (2005). "Technofeminism". Science as Culture. 14 (1): 97–101. doi:10.1080/09505430500042130. S2CID 219715620.
- Gill, Rosalind; Herdieckerhoff, Elena (2006). "Rewriting the romance: new femininities in chick lit?". Feminist Media Studies. 6 (4): 487–504. doi:10.1080/14680777.2011.537029. S2CID 144273865.
- Gill, Rosalind (2007). "Postfeminist media culture: Elements of a sensibility". European Journal of Cultural Studies. 10 (2): 147–166. doi:10.1177/1367549407075898. hdl:2262/52270. S2CID 145620486.
- Gill, Rosalind (2008). "Empowerment/sexism: Figuring female sexual agency in contemporary advertising" (PDF). Feminism & Psychology. 18 (1): 35–60. doi:10.1177/0959353507084950. S2CID 145666587.
- Gill, Rosalind (2009). "Beyond the "Sexualization of Culture" thesis: an intersectional analysis of "sixpacks", "midriffs" and "hot lesbians" in advertising". Sexualities. 12 (2): 137–160. doi:10.1177/1363460708100916. S2CID 144941660.
- Gill, Rosalind (2009). "Mediated intimacy and postfeminism: a discourse analytic examination of sex and relationships advice in a women's magazine" (PDF). Discourse & Communication. 3 (4): 345–369. doi:10.1177/1750481309343870. S2CID 146251079.
- Gill, Rosalind (2011). "Sexism reloaded, or, it's time to get angry again!". Feminist Media Studies. 11 (1): 61–71. doi:10.1080/14680777.2011.537029. S2CID 144273865.
- Gill, Rosalind (2012). "Media, empowerment and the Sexualization of Culture debates". Sex Roles. 66 (11–12): 736–745. doi:10.1111/j.1751-9004.2012.00433.x.
- Gill, Rosalind (2012). "The sexualisation of culture?". Social and Personality Psychology Compass. 6 (7): 483–498. doi:10.1111/j.1751-9004.2012.00433.x.
- Gill, Rosalind; Tyler, Imogen (2013). "Postcolonial girl: Mediated intimacy and migrant audibility". Interventions: International Journal of Postcolonial Studies. 15 (1): 78–94. doi:10.1080/1369801X.2013.771008. S2CID 144709880.
- Gill, Rosalind (2014). "Powerful women, vulnerable men and postfeminist masculinity in men's popular fiction". Gender and Language. 8 (2): 185–204. doi:10.1558/genl.v8i2.185. Pdf.
- Gill, Rosalind (2014). "Academics, cultural workers and critical labour studies" (PDF). Journal of Cultural Economy. 7 (1): 12–30. doi:10.1080/17530350.2013.861763. S2CID 144760376.
- Gill, Rosalind; Conor, Bridget; Taylor, Stephanie (May 2015). "Gender and creative labour" (PDF). The Sociological Review. 63 (s1): 1–22. doi:10.1111/1467-954X.12237. S2CID 145589185.

=== Books ===
- Gill, Rosalind; Grint, Keith, eds. (1995). The gender-technology relation: contemporary theory and research. London Bristol, Pennsylvania: Taylor & Francis. ISBN 9780748401611.
- Gill, Rosalind (2007). Gender and the media. Cambridge, UK Malden, Massachusetts, USA: Polity. ISBN 9780745612737.
- Gill, Rosalind (2008). Discourse analysis text, narrative and representation. City: Open University Press. ISBN 9780335217342.
- Gill, Rosalind; Ryan-Flood, Róisín (2010). Secrecy and silence in the research process: feminist reflections. London: Routledge. ISBN 9780415605175.
- Gill, Rosalind; Scharff, Christina (2011). New femininities: postfeminism, neoliberalism, and subjectivity. Houndmills, Basingstoke, Hampshire New York: Palgrave Macmillan. ISBN 9780230223349.
- Gill, Rosalind; Banks, Mark; Taylor, Stephanie Eds (2013). Theorizing cultural work: labour, continuity and change in the cultural and creative industries. Abingdon, Oxon: Routledge. ISBN 9780415502337.
- Gill, Rosalind; Scharff, Christina; Elias, Ana Sofia (2016). Aesthetic labour: rethinking beauty politics in neoliberalism. Houndmills, Basingstoke, Hampshire New York: Palgrave Macmillan. ISBN 9781137477644.
- Gill, Rosalind; Barker, Meg-John; Harvey, Laura (2018). Mediated intimacy: sex advice in media culture. Cambridge, UK Medford, Massachusetts: Polity Press. ISBN 9781509509157.
- Gill, Rosalind; Orgad, Shani (2021). Confidence Culture. Durham, UK: Duke University Press. ISBN 9781478017608

=== Chapters in books ===
- Gill, Rosalind; Grint, Keith (1995), "Introduction – the gender-technology relation: contemporary theory and research.", in Gill, Rosalind; Grint, Keith (eds.), The gender-technology relation: contemporary theory and research, London Bristol, Pennsylvania: Taylor & Francis, pp. 1–28, ISBN 9780748401611.
- Gill, Rosalind (2003), "Power and the production of subjects: a genealogy of the New Man and the New Lad", in Benwell, Bethan (ed.), Masculinity and men's lifestyle magazines, Oxford, UK Malden, MA, USA: Blackwell Publisher/Sociological Review, pp. 34–56, ISBN 9781405114639. pdf version Gender Institute, London School of Economics.
- Gill, Rosalind (2010), "Supersexulize me! Advertising and the "midriffs"", in Dines, Gail; Humez, Jean M. (eds.), Gender, race and class in media: a critical reader (3rd ed.), California: SAGE, pp. 255–260, ISBN 9781412974417.
- Gill, Rosalind (2010), "Gender", in Albertazzi, Daniele; Cobley, Paul (eds.), The media: an introduction (3rd ed.), New York: Pearson Education, pp. 410–426, ISBN 9781405840361.
- Gill, Rosalind (2010), "Breaking the silence: the hidden injuries of the neoliberal university.", in Gill, Rosalind; Ryan-Flood, Róisín (eds.), Secrecy and silence in the research process: feminist reflections, London: Routledge, pp. 228–244, ISBN 9780415605175.
- Gill, Rosalind; Harvey, Laura (2011), "Spicing it up: sexual entrepreneurs and the sex inspectors.", in Gill, Rosalind; Scharff, Christina (eds.), New femininities: postfeminism, neoliberalism, and subjectivity, Houndmills, Basingstoke, Hampshire New York: Palgrave Macmillan, pp. 52–67, ISBN 9780230223349.
- Gill, Rosalind (2011), "Bend it like Beckham: the challenges of reading gender and visual culture.", in Reavey, Paula (ed.), Visual methods in psychology: using and interpreting images in qualitative research, Hove, East Sussex New York: Psychology Press Routledge, pp. 29–42, ISBN 9780415483483.
- Gill, Rosalind (2011), "Lad flicks: discursive reconstructions of masculinity in popular film.", in Radner, Hilary; Stringer, Rebecca (eds.), Feminism at the movies: understanding gender in contemporary popular cinema, Oxon New York: Routledge, ISBN 9780415895880.
- Gill, Rosalind; Donaghue, Ngaire (2013), "Agency, sex and postfeminism.", in Madhok, Sumi; Phillips, Anne; Wilson, Kalpana (eds.), Gender, agency, and coercion, Basingstoke, Hampshire New York, New York: Palgrave Macmillan, ISBN 9780230300323.
- Gill, Rosalind (2015), "Postfeminist sexual culture.", in Carter, Cynthia; Steiner, Linda; McLaughlin, Lisa (eds.), The Routledge companion to media & gender, London New York: Routledge, pp. 589–599, ISBN 9781138849129.

== See also ==
- Feminist philosophy
- Feminist theory
- Gender studies
