= Greg Myers (linguist) =

American linguist

- Born: 22 November 1954 (age 71); Boise, Idaho, United States
- Known for: Critical discourse analysis

Academic background
- Education: Pomona College

Academic work
- Discipline: Linguist
- Sub-discipline: Critical discourse analysis
- Institutions: Lancaster University
- Website: Myers on the website of Lancaster University

Greg Myers (born 1954) is an American linguist. He is currently an Emeritus professor at the Department of Linguistics and English Language of Lancaster University, United Kingdom. His research focuses on applied linguistics with a special focus on critical discourse analysis.

== Career ==
He was the editor of the journal: Discourse, Context and Media.

He has been on the editorial boards of the journals Applied Linguistics, Discourse & Society, English for Specific Purposes, ESPecialist, Language in Society, Language Teaching Research, Science as Culture, Text and Talk, and Written Communication.

Myers was the editor, along with Ruth Wodak, the John Benjamins Publishing Company's series Discourse Approaches to Politics, Society, and Culture.

In 2011, Myers was elected as the Fellow of the Academy of Social Sciences.

Between 2012 and 2015, Myers was the Chair of the British Association for Applied Linguistics (BAAL).

== Research ==
Myers's most cited work is entitled Writing Biology: Texts in the Social Construction of Scientific Knowledge. It was published by the University of Wisconsin Press, in 1990. By using the techniques of rhetorical analysis, Myers studied the fortunes of two biologists: David Bloch and David Crews.

In a research article, entitled The pragmatics of politeness in scientific articles and published in Applied Linguistics in 1989, Myers proposed a simple model of a two-part audience, and focus on two kinds of impositions: claims and denials of claims.

== Publications ==
Myers has publications in several major journals such as Discourse Studies, Applied Linguistics, Journal of Sociolinguistics, Journal of Risk Research, Critical Discourse Studies, Journal of Pragmatics, Qualitative Research, Language and Literature, Celebrity Studies, Text and Talk, Media, Culture and Society, and Environment and Planning.

== Bibliography ==
=== Books ===
- Myers, G. (1990). Writing biology: Texts in the social construction of scientific knowledge. Madison, WI: University of Wisconsin Press.
- Myers, G. (1994). Words in Ads. London: Arnold.
- Myers, G. (1999). Ad worlds: brands, media, audiences. London: Arnold.
- Myers, G. (2004). Matters of opinion: talking about public issues. (Studies in interactional sociolinguistics). Cambridge: Cambridge University Press.
- Myers, G. (2010). The discourse of blogs and wikis. (Continuum Discourse Series). London: Continuum.

=== Articles ===
- Myers, G., & Lampropoulou, S. (2012). Impersonal you and stance-taking in social research interviews. Journal of Pragmatics, 44(10), 1206-1218. doi:
- Lampropoulou, S., & Myers, G. (2013). Stance-taking in interviews from the Qualidata Archive. Forum Qualitative Sozialforschung / Forum: Qualitative Social Research, 14(1), [12].
- Myers, G., & Lampropoulou, S. (2013). What Place References Can Do in Social Research Interviews. Discourse Studies, 15(3), 333-351. doi:
- Myers, G. A., & Lampropoulou, S. (2016). Laughter, non-seriousness and transitions in social research interview transcripts. Qualitative Research, 16(1), 78-94. doi:
- Myers, G. (2016). Response to 'Reading in the age of the internet'. Language and Literature, 25(3), 279-285. doi:
- Myers, G. (2016). Everyday oracles: authors on Twitter. Celebrity Studies, 7(4), 476-492. doi:
