= Well he would, wouldn't he? =

1963 remark by Mandy Rice-Davies

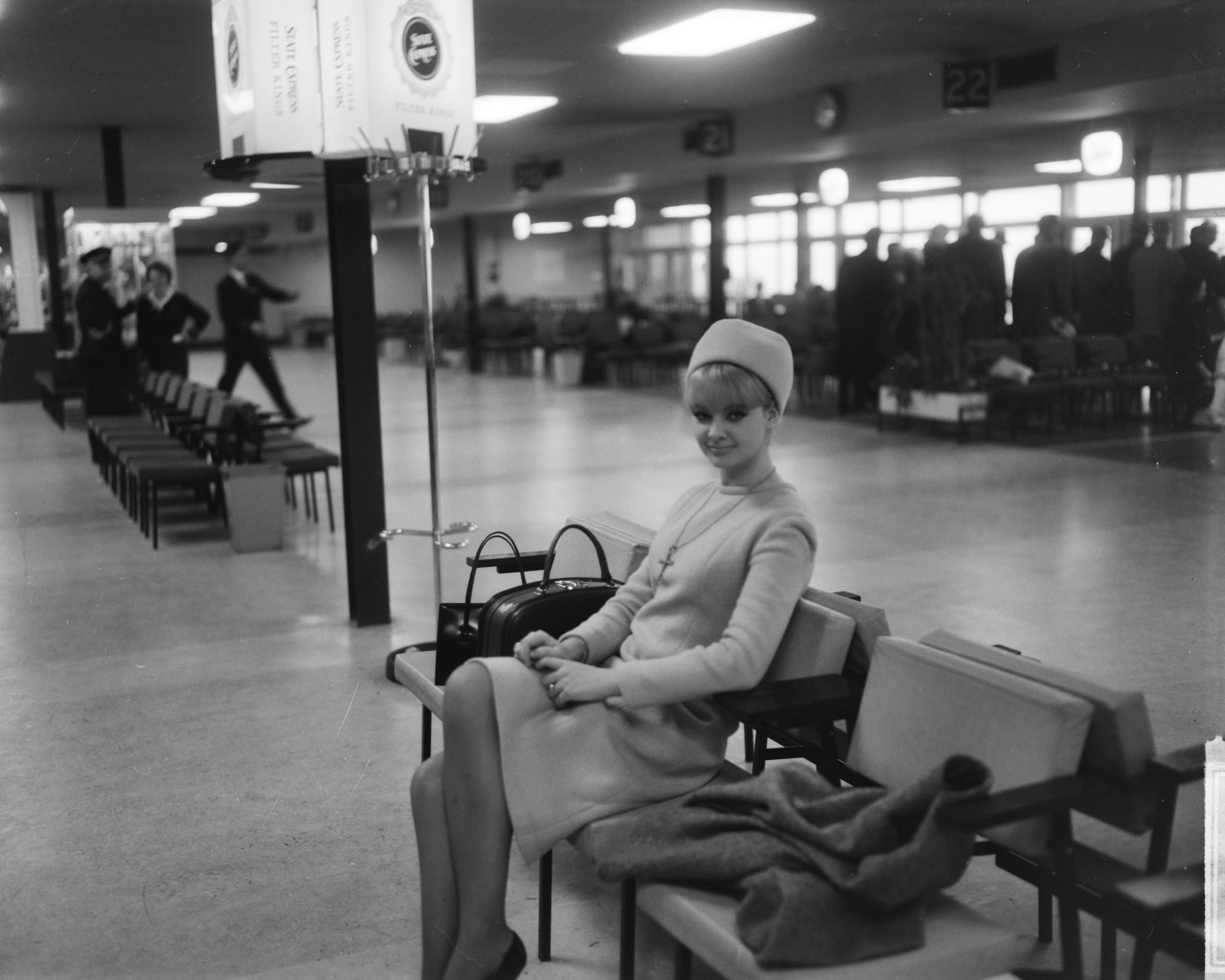
Mandy Rice-Davies uttered the phrase.

"Well he would, wouldn't he?", (Note: Quoted by contemporary sources as "he would, wouldn't he?"; sometimes misquoted as "well he would say that, wouldn't he?") occasionally referenced as Mandy Rice-Davies applies (shortened to MRDA), is a British political phrase and aphorism that is commonly used as a retort to a self-interested denial.

The Welsh model Mandy Rice-Davies used the phrase while giving evidence during the 1963 trial of the English osteopath Stephen Ward. Ward is considered to have been made a scapegoat for the Profumo affair, a scandal involving John Profumo, the Secretary of State for War. Profumo had an extramarital affair with Rice-Davies's friend, the model Christine Keeler, then lied about that affair to Parliament before publicly admitting to misleading the House. Ward was tried for living on the earnings of prostitution. The prosecution alleged that members of the British elite paid Rice-Davies and Keeler for sex, who then paid Ward from their earnings. During the trial, Ward's lawyer James Burge asked Rice-Davies whether she was aware that Lord Astor—a hereditary peer and Conservative politician—had denied having an affair with her; Rice-Davies replied "Well he would, wouldn't he?"

Since its widespread adoption following the Ward trial, political commentators, communications experts, and psychologists have interpreted "Well he would, wouldn't he?" as a political phrase that is used to indicate that the speaker believes that another person is making a self-interested denial. They have also stated that the phrase functions as a commonsense retort to the lies of elite political figures. Linguistically, the phrase has been noted for its use of the modal verb would to create rhetorical effect. The phrase has been included in the Oxford Dictionary of Quotations since 1979.

== Background ==
=== Profumo affair ===
The Profumo affair concerned John Profumo, the British Secretary of State for War, who, beginning in July 1961, had an extramarital affair with the model Christine Keeler. He denied this to the House of Commons in March 1963 when Keeler's private life became public; weeks later, he was found to have misled Parliament. The scandal severely damaged the Conservative government of Harold Macmillan, who, in October 1963, resigned for reasons of ill health. (Note: Macmillan believed that he had prostate cancer following a doctor's statement that he had an "inflammation of the prostate gland (by either a benign or malignant tumour)".) Interest in the scandal was heightened by Keeler's sexual involvement with Yevgeny Ivanov, a naval attaché at the Soviet embassy, which meant a possible national security risk. Keeler had been introduced to both Ivanov and Profumo through her friendship with Stephen Ward, an osteopath and socialite who rented a cottage on the grounds of the Cliveden estate—where Keeler and Profumo met—from William Astor, 3rd Viscount Astor, a hereditary peer and Conservative politician.

=== Investigation of Stephen Ward ===
After Profumo revealed that he had lied, the police began to investigate Ward, who was arrested and charged with living "wholly or in part on the earnings of prostitution". The police based their case on allegations that Keeler and her friend Mandy Rice-Davies, a Welsh showgirl and model, had been paid for sex and had subsequently given money to Ward. Rice-Davies was briefly jailed in HMP Holloway until she agreed to testify against Ward. Writing in The Guardian in 2014, the barrister Geoffrey Robertson stated that the Macmillan government had her arrested to coerce her into testifying. Robertson and Ward's biographer Richard Davenport-Hines consider Ward to be a scapegoat for the Profumo affair.

== Utterance ==
On 28 June 1963 Rice-Davies was cross-examined at Ward's committal proceedings at Marylebone magistrates' court, appearing the day after Keeler. The journalist Clive Irving, in his book on the Profumo affair—Scandal '63—wrote that Rice-Davies

wore a simple, grey dress and a hat of red petals, and unlike Miss Keeler she had a simple spontaneity ... Miss Rice-Davies's voice bubbled up and conquered the architecture. She seemed not bright enough to be a liar, and the drift of the questioning obviously eluded her. Her face ... was pale, like Keeler's, and her eyes had the same heavy make-up, which began to run when a hot sun came through the skylight of the court.

During the proceedings Ward's lawyer James Burge questioned her about her alleged affair with Lord Astor. Burge's question to Rice-Davies is variously given as "Do you know Lord Astor has made a statement to the police saying that these allegations of yours are absolutely untrue?" and "Are you aware that Lord Astor denies any impropriety in his relationship with you?". It is reported that Rice-Davies replied "Well he would, wouldn't he?" to laughter in the court. Newspapers also reported that Burge and Rice-Davies had the following exchange:

James Burge: Do you know the Indian doctor (Note: Referring to Emil Savundra, a Ceylonese (Sri Lankan) businessman with whom Rice-Davies had sexual relations.) has made a statement to the police saying that these allegations are absolutely untrue? Mandy Rice-Davies: I can't help that, can I?

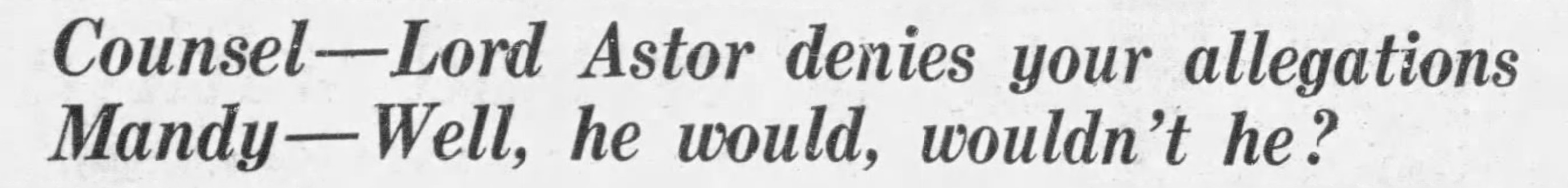
The phrase as quoted in the Evening Standard newspaper

Rice-Davies's retort about Lord Astor was widely reported in the press the day after her testimony, and the Evening Standard featured the phrase above the headline on its front page. Some contemporary sources reported Rice-Davies's retort as "he would, wouldn't he?"; it is also sometimes misquoted as "well he would say that, wouldn't he?" (Note: Ivan Lawrence, who was Burge's pupil and attended the trial, recorded Rice-Davies's response as "Of course it's not untrue that I have had relations with Lord Astor. I'm not going to perjure myself in court." The Guardian's readers' editor investigated Lawrence's claim and determined that leading British newspapers at the time reported the question-and-answer as: James Burge: Do you know Lord Astor has made a statement to the police saying that these allegations of yours are absolutely untrue? Mandy Rice-Davies: He would, wouldn't he?)

== Analysis ==
"Well he would, wouldn't he?" is also commonly referred to as "Mandy Rice-Davies applies" (MRDA), and is an aphorism. The phrase is used as a retort to a self-interested denial. It has been interpreted in political, rhetorical, and linguistic terms as representing a counter to political elites, an ironic response to self-interested criticism, and a means of dismissing a person's opinion.

=== Political use ===
As a political phrase, "Well he would, wouldn't he?" has been interpreted as a form of defiance against elite political figures. The Scotsman and The New York Times, in their 2014 obituaries of Rice-Davies, wrote that her response represented "a new lack of deference" by ordinary people toward the political figures of post–World War II austerity governments, (Note: In 2014 Rice-Davies said: "It was the age of deference, wasn't it? People still doffed their caps. I'm afraid I have no deference.") and The Independent commented that it "became a potent symbol of changing times". Robert McCrum, in his review of Peter Stanford's biography of Bronwen Astor, stated that the phrase was "among the most devastating sentences uttered in the English language in the last half century", and that it caused the Macmillan government's "careful reconstruction of pre-war social certainties" to be "finally exposed as utterly fraudulent".

In a 2015 article Gerard Hastings, an expert in social marketing, wrote that the phrase captured the idea of vested interest, and that with its utterance, Rice-Davies had exposed—as he saw it—that people in positions of power are willing to cover up their misdeeds and put their own interests above national security. (Note: Hastings uses the Cold War as the example for his claim about national security.) The psychologists Derek Edwards and Jonathan Potter have suggested that Rice-Davies's use of ordinary language undermined the authority of elite lawyers and the aristocracy's denials. The historian Ged Martin said that the phrase represents a truism that some evidence presented in self-defence should be doubted "because it is inconceivable that its source would have said anything else".

=== Linguistic analysis ===
Scholars have analysed "Well he would, wouldn't he?" in linguistic and rhetorical terms as a statement that uses linguistic modality to dismiss another person's opinion as self-interested, obvious, or irrelevant. Daniel Carroll, Anne-Marie Simon-VandenBergen, and Sonia Vandepitt said that the phrase is a famous example of "usuality modalisation", which can be used to "present a personal opinion in terms of a general rule". They said that the phrase, as an if–then statement, enables the speaker to cast an opponent's utterance as "'too obvious to be worthy of comment' or irrelevant to the discussion", while showing that they are not surprised. The philosopher Timothy Williamson stated that Rice-Davies's statement was an effective explanation of Lord Astor's denial because his self-interest was evident, irrespective of whether she was being truthful; he suggested that Rice-Davies would not have achieved the same effect had she instead said "Well he did, didn't he?"

Edwards and Potter contended that Rice-Davies's response rebutted—through use of the modal verb would—an implied criticism from Lord Astor (that Rice-Davies was lying) by ironically suggesting that he was known as a self-interested person. They also stated that the phrase signifies to the listener that because the speaker of the original claim is self-interested, their opinion can be discounted. Likewise, the conversation analysts Alexa Hepburn and Sally Wiggins wrote in their 2007 book Discursive Research in Practice that Rice-Davies's statement should be evaluated from the subjective standpoint of "Astor's stake or interest in the matter" and his "clear motive to lie", rather than from an objective standpoint of reality.

== Legacy ==
"Well he would, wouldn't he?" has been included in the Oxford Dictionary of Quotations (as "he would, wouldn't he") since 1979; the addition, according to her biographer Richard Davenport-Hines, "delighted" Rice-Davies. In its obituary of Rice-Davies, The Washington Post said that "the quip ... endeared her to the public". The 1992 edition of Eric Partridge's Dictionary of Catch Phrases states that the phrase "acknowledges the exasperating, and predictably contrary, reaction of someone known to the speaker(s)".

== Sources ==
=== Books and journal articles ===
- Antaki, Charles; Horowitz, Ava (2010). "Using identity ascription to disqualify a rival version of events as 'interested'". Research on Language and Social Interaction. 33 (2): 155–177. doi:10.1207/S15327973RLSI3302_2. S2CID 144907668.
- Chorley, Matt (2023). Planes, Trains and Toilet Doors: 50 Places that Changed British Politics. London: William Collins. ISBN 978-0-00-862206-0.
- Edwards, Derek (2006). "Facts, norms and dispositions: practical uses of the modal verb would in police interrogations". Discourse Studies. 8 (4): 475–501. doi:10.1177/1461445606064830. S2CID 145483143.
- Edwards, Derek; Potter, Jonathan (1992). Discursive Psychology. Inquiries in Social Construction. London: Sage Publications. ISBN 978-0-8039-8442-4.
- Hastings, Gerard (2015). "'Well, he would say that, wouldn't he?'". Addiction. 110 (8): 1226–1227. doi:10.1111/add.12965. PMID 26173153.
- Hepburn, Alexa; Wiggins, Sally (2007). Discursive Research in Practice. Cambridge University Press. ISBN 978-0-521-84929-6.
- Horne, Alistair (1988). Macmillan: The Official Biography. Vol. 2. Frome, Somerset: Macmillan. ISBN 978-0-33-349621-3.
- Irving, Clive; Hall, Ron; Wallington, Jeremy (1964). Scandal '63: The Profumo Sensation: Complete. London: William Heinemann. OCLC 989401716.
- Martin, Ged (2004). Past Futures: The Impossible Necessity of History. University of Toronto Press. doi:10.3138/9781442620971. ISBN 978-1-4426-2097-1 – via De Gruyter.
- Partridge, Eric (1992). Dictionary of Catch Phrases. Lanham, Maryland: Scarborough House. ISBN 978-1-46-166040-8.
- Robertson, Geoffrey (2013). Stephen Ward was Innocent, OK: The Case for Overturning His Conviction. London: Biteback Publishing. ISBN 978-1-84-954690-4.
- Thorpe, D. R. (2010). Supermac: The Life of Harold Macmillan. London: Vintage Digital. OCLC 1004975387.
- Williamson, Timothy (2020). Suppose and Tell: The Semantics and Heuristics of Conditionals. Oxford University Press. doi:10.1093/oso/9780198860662.001.0001. ISBN 978-0-19-886066-2.

=== Newspaper articles ===
- Bowcott, Owen (2 December 2013). "Profumo affair scapegoat's wrongful conviction down to top judges, says QC". The Guardian. Archived from the original on 5 December 2013.
- Cowell, Alan (19 December 2014). "Mandy Rice-Davies, figure in Profumo scandal, dies at 70". The New York Times. Archived from the original on 2 December 2023.
- Elliott, Chris (27 January 2013). "The readers' editor on why that cheeky Mandy Rice-Davies quote needs no correction". The Guardian. Archived from the original on 20 September 2023.
- "A Cliveden swim—by Miss R". Evening Standard. 29 June 1963 – via Newspapers.com.
- Halls, Eleanor (27 January 2020). "'It was just a pimple': how Mandy Rice-Davies shrugged off the Profumo affair, and spun a scandal into gold". The Daily Telegraph. Archived from the original on 7 January 2024.
- "Mandy Rice-Davies, figure in Profumo sex scandal, dies at 70". The Washington Post. 19 December 2014. Archived from the original on 15 December 2017.
- Maume, Chris (20 December 2014). "Obituaries: Mandy Rice-Davies". The Independent. p. 43 – via Newspapers.com.
- McCrum, Robert (27 February 2000). "She would, wouldn't she?". The Guardian. Archived from the original on 29 November 2022.
- "Profumo scandal's Mandy Rice-Davies dies aged 70". The Scotsman. 19 December 2014. Archived from the original on 7 July 2022.
- Robertson, Geoffrey (19 December 2014). "Mandy Rice-Davies: fabled player in a very British scandal". The Guardian. Archived from the original on 26 August 2023.
- "Second day of the Ward case". The Observer. 30 June 1963. p. 4 – via Newspapers.com.
- Sherwin, Adam (16 December 2019). "BBC's The Trial of Christine Keeler gets famous 'he would ...' quote right". iNews. Archived from the original on 30 October 2022.
- Stanford, Peter (19 December 2014). "Mandy Rice-Davies obituary". The Guardian. Archived from the original on 2 October 2023.
- Tonkin, Boyd (12 January 2013). "Half a century after Profumo's fall, a different kind of deference still stifles us". The Independent. Archived from the original on 9 July 2022.
- Tweedie, Neil (2 December 2013). "The Profumo affair: 'It was decided that Stephen Ward had to die'". The Daily Telegraph. Archived from the original on 31 October 2021.

=== Other ===
- Carroll, Daniel; Simon-VandenBergen, Anne-Marie; Vandepitt, Sonia (1986). "Mood and modality in political interviews". In van Eemeren, Frans H.; Grootendorst, Rob; Blair, J. Anthony; Willard, Charles A. (eds.). Argumentation: Perspectives and Approaches. Conference on Argumentation 1986. Studies of Argumentation in Pragmatics and Discourse Analysis (PDA). Vol. 3A. Dordrecht: Foris Publications Holland. pp. 52–60. doi:10.1515/9783110869163.52. ISBN 90-6765-319-5 – via De Gruyter.
- Davenport-Hines, Richard (2018). "Davies, Marilyn Rice [known as Mandy Rice-Davies]". Oxford Dictionary of National Biography (online ed.). Oxford University Press. doi:10.1093/odnb/9780198614128.013.108173. (Subscription, Wikipedia Library access or UK public library membership required.)
- Davenport-Hines, Richard (2013). "Ward, Stephen Thomas". Oxford Dictionary of National Biography (online ed.). Oxford University Press. doi:10.1093/ref:odnb/40839. (Subscription, Wikipedia Library access or UK public library membership required.)
- Knowles, Elizabeth, ed. (2014). "Mandy Rice-Davies (1944–2014)". Oxford Dictionary of Quotations (8th ed.). Oxford University Press. doi:10.1093/acref/9780199668700.001.0001. ISBN 978-0-19-966870-0.
