= Meredith Marra =

New Zealand professor of linguistics

- Born: 1974 (age 51–52)

Academic background
- Education: Victoria University of Wellington
- Thesis: Decisions in New Zealand business meetings: a sociolinguistic analysis of power at work (2003)

Meredith Helena Marra (born 1974) is a New Zealand academic, and is a full professor of linguistics at University of Canterbury, specialising in sociolinguistics and workplace discourse.

== Academic career ==
Marra completed a PhD at Victoria University of Wellington in 2003, in which she used critical discourse analysis to examine decision-making language. She initially intended to be an accountant, but changed focus after taking a linguistic course in her second year as an undergraduate. Marra then joined the faculty of Massey University, before moving back to Victoria, and rising to full professor in 2020.

Marra is a linguist, and researches workplace discourse and culture. She focuses mainly on the language of business meetings, but has published on power, politeness, humour and aspects of identity. Marra describes humour in the workplace as "social glue" and says that "humour is serious", as it can be used to both include and exclude people. Since 2015 Marra has been the director of the Wellington-based Language in the Workplace project, which studies workplace language with the aim of helping improve working culture in New Zealand and overseas. They have found that New Zealanders tend to use chit-chat and humour more than British or American workers, and this can be confusing for new migrants. Marra has also looked at gender and ethnic identity in relation to bias and discrimination in the workplace.

Marra has co-edited a number of books, including a festschrift for Janet Holmes, with Paul Warren.

== Selected works ==
=== Books ===
- Holmes, Janet; Marra, Meredith; Vine, Bernadette, eds. (2011). Leadership, Discourse, and Ethnicity. Oxford Studies in Sociolinguistics. doi:10.1093/acprof:oso/9780199730759.001.0001. ISBN 978-0-19-973075-9.
- Holmes, Janet; Marra, Meredith, eds. (11 August 2010). Femininity, Feminism and Gendered Discourse: A Selected and Edited Collection of Papers from the Fifth International Language and Gender Association Conference (IGALA5). Cambridge Scholars Publishing. ISBN 9781443824378.Holmes J Marra M. Femininity, Feminism and Gendered Discourse : A Selected and Edited Collection of Papers from the Fifth International Language and Gender Association Conference Igala5. Cambridge Scholars; 2010.
- Angouri, Jo; Marra, Meredith; Holmes, Janet, eds. (10 May 2017). "Introduction: Negotiating Boundaries at Work". Negotiating Boundaries at Work. Edinburgh University Press. pp. 1–8. doi:10.1515/9781474403146-002. ISBN 9781474403146.
- Marra, Meredith; Warren, Paul, eds. (2017). Linguist at work : festschrift for Janet Holmes. Wellington: Victoria University Press. ISBN 9781776561728.
- Angouri, Jo; Marra, Meredith, eds. (2011). Constructing Identities at Work. London: Palgrave Macmillan. ISBN 978-0-230-27237-8.

=== Journal articles ===
- Holmes, Janet; Marra, Meredith Helena (2002). "Having a laugh at work". Journal of Pragmatics. 34 (12): 1683–1710. doi:10.1016/s0378-2166(02)00032-2. Wikidata Q124350957.
- Holmes, Janet; Marra, Meredith Helena (2004). "Relational practice in the workplace: Women's talk or gendered discourse?". Language in Society. 33 (03). doi:10.1017/s0047404504043039. Wikidata Q124350958.
- Holmes, Janet; Marra, Meredith Helena (2006). "Humor and leadership style". Humor. 19 (2). doi:10.1515/humor.2006.006. Wikidata Q124350965.
- Stubbe, Maria; Chris Lane; Hilder, Jo; Elaine Vine; Bernadette Vine; Marra, Meredith Helena; Holmes, Janet; Ann Weatherall (2003). "Multiple Discourse Analyses of a Workplace Interaction". Discourse Studies. 5 (3): 351–388. doi:10.1177/14614456030053004. Wikidata Q124350964.
- Bernadette Vine; Holmes, Janet; Marra, Meredith Helena; Dale Pfeifer; Brad Jackson (2008). "Exploring Co-leadership Talk Through Interactional Sociolinguistics". Leadership. 4 (3): 339–360. doi:10.1177/1742715008092389. Wikidata Q124350968.
- Holmes, Janet; Marra, Meredith Helena; Stephanie Schnurr (2008). "Impoliteness and ethnicity: Māori and Pākehā discourse in New Zealand workplaces". Journal of Politeness Research. 4 (2). doi:10.1515/jplr.2008.010. Wikidata Q124350970.
