= Ann Weatherall =

New Zealand psychology academic (born 1964)

Ann Weatherall (born 1964) is a New Zealand academic psychologist. Her research methodologies include discursive psychology and conversation analysis, and interests include 'the relationships between gendered patterns of social disadvantage, language and discourse.' In 2014 she received a Marsden grant to investigate rape culture. She was an editor of the 'Women's Studies Journal' until 2012. From 2022 - 2025 she was head of psychology at the University of Bedfordshire.

== Selected works ==
- Weatherall, Ann. Gender, language and discourse. Routledge, 2005.
- Weatherall, Ann, and White, Jo. "A grounded theory analysis of older adults and information technology." Educational Gerontology 26.4 (2000): 371–386.
- Ulrich, Miriam, and Ann Weatherall. "Motherhood and infertility: Viewing motherhood through the lens of infertility." Feminism & Psychology 10.3 (2000): 323–336.
- Bayard, D., Weatherall, Ann, Gallois, C., & Pittam, J. (2001). Pax Americana? Accent attitudinal evaluations in New Zealand, Australia and America. Journal of Sociolinguistics, 5(1), 22–49.
