= Discursive psychology =

Form of discourse analysis

Discursive psychology (DP) is a form of discourse analysis that focuses on psychological themes in talk, text, and images.

As a counter to mainstream psychology's treatment of discourse as a "mirror" for people's expressions of thoughts, intentions, motives, etc., DP's founders made the case for picturing it instead as a "construction yard" wherein all such presumptively prior and independent notions of thought and so on were built from linguistic materials, topicalised and, in various less direct ways, handled and managed. Here, the study of the psychological implies commitment not to the inner life of the mind, but rather, to the written and spoken practices within which people invoked, implicitly or explicitly, notions precisely like "the inner life of the mind". Discursive psychology therefore starts with psychological phenomena as things that are constructed, attended to, and understood in interaction. An evaluation, say, may be constructed using particular phrases and idioms, responded to by the recipient (as a compliment perhaps) and treated as the expression of a strong position. In discursive psychology, the focus is not on psychological matters somehow leaking out into interaction; rather, interaction is the primary site where psychological issues are live. It is philosophically opposed to more traditional cognitivist approaches to language. It uses studies of naturally occurring conversation to critique the way that topics have been conceptualised and treated in psychology.

== History ==
The origins of what is now termed "discursive psychology" can arguably be traced to the late 1980s, and the collaborative research and analysis sessions that took place as part of Loughborough University's then newly formed Discourse and Rhetoric Group (DARG). A key landmark was the publication of Jonathan Potter and Margaret Wetherell's classic text Discourse and social psychology: Beyond attitudes and behaviour in 1987. Charles Antaki, writing in the Times Higher Education Supplement, described the impact of this book:

Potter and Wetherell have genuinely presented us with a different way of working in social psychology. The book's clarity means that it has the power to influence a lot of people ill-at-ease with traditional social psychology but unimpressed with (or simply bewildered by) other alternatives on offer. It could rescue social psychology from the sterility of the laboratory and its traditional mentalism.

The linguistic reorientation associated with discursive psychology drew on intellectual movements that challenged traditional psychological explanation, including post-structuralism, postmodernism, Foucault’s analyses of knowledge/power, theories of ideology, Lacanian psychoanalysis, microsociology, and social constructionism. It was further informed by analytic traditions such as conversation analysis, ethnomethodology, classical rhetoric, the sociology of science, Rom Harré’s ethogenics, and speech act theory. The field itself was originally labeled as DP during the early 1990s by Derek Edwards and Potter at Loughborough University. It has since been developed and extended by a number of others, including (but by no means limited to): Charles Antaki, Malcolm Ashmore, Frederick Attenborough, Bethan Benwell, Steve Brown, Carly Butler, Derek Edwards, Alexa Hepburn, Eric Laurier, Hedwig te Molder, Sue Speer, Liz Stokoe, Cristian Tileaga, Sally Wiggins and Sue Wilkinson. Discursive psychology draws on the philosophy of mind of Gilbert Ryle and the later Ludwig Wittgenstein, the rhetorical approach of Michael Billig, the ethnomethodology of Harold Garfinkel, the conversation analysis of Harvey Sacks and the sociology of scientific knowledge of those like Mike Mulkay, Steve Woolgar and Bruno Latour. The term "discursive psychology" was designed partly to indicate that there was not just a methodological shift at work in this form of analysis, but also, and at the same time, that it involved some fairly radical theoretical rethinking.

== Study ==
Discursive psychology conducts studies of both naturally occurring and experimentally engineered human interaction that offer new ways of understanding topics in social and cognitive psychology such as memory, identity and attitude. Although discursive psychology subscribes to a different view of human mentality than is advanced by mainstream psychology, Edwards and Potter's work was originally motivated by their dissatisfaction with how psychology had treated discourse. In many psychological studies, the things people (subjects) say are treated as windows (with varying degrees of opacity) into their minds. Talk is seen as (and, in experimental psychology and protocol analysis, used as) descriptions of people's mental content. In contrast, discursive psychology treats talk as social action; that is, we say what we do as a means of, and in the course of, doing things in a socially meaningful world. Thus, the questions that it makes sense to ask also change.

== DP-in-action: an illustration ==
DP can be illustrated with an example from Edwards' research on script formulations. Traditional social psychology treats scripts as mentally encoded templates that guide action. Discursive psychology focuses on the foundational issue of how a description is built to present a course of action as following from a standardized routine. Take the following example from a couple counselling session (the transcription symbols here were developed by Gail Jefferson). The Counsellor says: "before you moved over here how was the marriage". After a delay of about half a second, Connie, the wife who is being jointly counselled, replies "Oh to me all along, right up to now, my marriage was rock solid. Rock solid = We had arguments like everybody else had arguments, but to me there was no major problems." One thing that discursive psychologists would be interested in would be the way that Connie depicts the arguments that she and her partner have as the routine kind of arguments that everybody has. While arguments might be thought as a problem with a marriage, Connie "script formulates" them as actually characteristic of a "rock solid" marriage. Action and interaction is accomplished as orderly in interactions of this kind. Discursive psychology focuses on the locally organized practices for constructing the world to serve relevant activities (in this case managing the live question of who is to blame and who needs to change in the counselling). In the discursive psychological vision, scripts are an inseparable part of the practical and moral world of accountability.

== Applications of DP: spoken and textual approaches ==
In the past few years, one particular strand of discursive psychology has focused its analytic gaze on spoken interaction. As a consequence, it has relied heavily on (but also contributed to the development of) the principles and practices of conversation analysis. Focusing on material drawn from real world situations such as relationship counselling, child protection helplines, neighbour disputes and family mealtimes, it has asked questions such as: How does a party in relationship counselling construct the problem as something that the other party needs to work on? How does a child protection officer working on a child protection helpline manage the possibly competing tasks of soothing a crying caller and simultaneously eliciting evidence sufficient for social services to intervene to help an abused child? And what makes a parent's request to a child to eat different from a directive, and different in turn from a threat?

Although most recent DP oriented studies take talk-in-interaction as their primary data, it is not difficult to locate another strand of DP-related research in which texts are approached as sites for the active literary/narratorial management of matters such as agency, intent, doubt, culpability, belief, prejudice, and so on. One of the founding studies for this kind of textual approach was "Who killed the Princess? Description and Blame in the British Print Press" by Derek Edwards and Katie MacMillan. The "generally applicable discourse analytic approach" articulated and demonstrated therein has proved particularly useful for the study of media texts. Whereas traditional DP studies explore the situated, occasioned, rhetorical use of our rich common sense psychological lexicon across various forms of spoken data, this newer form of textual DP shows that and how authors use that same lexicon in order to present themselves (or others) as individuals and/or members of larger collectives that are (ab)normal, (ir)rational, (un)reasonable, etc. This approach has proved particularly productive in an age marked by the growth in usage of social media, SMS texts, photo messaging apps, blogs/vlogs, YouTube, interactive websites (etc.): never before have so many opportunities for explicitly public, accountably interactional and rhetorically motivated invocations of psychological terms been available to so many people.

== See also ==
- Critical discourse analysis
- Discursive complex
- Mediated stylistics
- Ordinary language philosophy
- Postcognitivism
- Stylistics (field of study)
