= Margaret Wetherell =

New Zealand academic (born 1954)

- Born: 24 November 1954 (age 71)

Academic background
- Education: Bristol University
- Thesis: Social identification, social influence and group polarisation (1983)
- Doctoral advisor: John Turner

Academic work
- Institutions: Open University, University of Auckland
- Main interests: Discourse analysis
- Website: open.ac.uk/Margaret_Wetherell

Margaret Wetherell (born 24 November 1954) is a prominent academic in the area of discourse analysis.

== Career ==
Wetherell worked for 23 years at the Open University, UK from which she retired as Emeritus Professor in 2011. She then took up a part-time post of Professor in Psychology at the University of Auckland, New Zealand.

== Work ==
Wetherell has promoted a discursive approach to psychology. Her 1987 book, Discourse and Social Psychology: Beyond Attitudes and Behaviour, cowritten with Jonathan Potter, was very influential, particularly in social psychology, though also in other fields (e.g. Wood & Kroger, 2000). While discourse analysis has many different meanings, Wetherell's approach has been quite catholic in line with other anglophone discourse analysts like Gilbert & Mulkay (1984).

Wetherell asserts that social actions and routines are formed within our respective social organizations, and that we can not separate a bodies, talk, and text.

In 2010/11 she led a collaboration on identity funded by the UK Economic and Social Research Council (ESRC).

== Selected bibliography ==
=== Books ===
- Wetherell, Margaret; Potter, Jonathan; Stringer, Peter (1984). Social texts and context: literature and social psychology. London Boston: Routledge & Kegan Paul. ISBN 9780710095534.
- Wetherell, Margaret; Potter, Jonathan (1987). Discourse and social psychology: beyond attitudes and behaviour. London Newbury Park, California: SAGE. ISBN 9780803980563.
- Wetherell, Margaret; Sapsford, Roger; Still, Arthur; Miell, Dorothy; Stevens, Richard (1998). Theory and social psychology. London Thousand Oaks California: SAGE in association with the Open University. ISBN 9780761958390.
- Wetherell, Margaret; Miell, Dorothy (1998). Doing social psychology. London Thousand Oaks, California: SAGE in association with the Open University. ISBN 9780761960492.
- Wetherell, Margaret; Miell, Dorothy; Sapsford, Roger; Still, Arthur; Stevens, Richard (1998). Theory and social psychology. London Thousand Oaks California: SAGE in association with the Open University. ISBN 9780761958390.
- Wetherell, Margaret; Taylor, Stephanie; Yates, Simeon J. (2001). Discourse theory and practice: a reader. D843 Course: Discourse Analysis. London Thousand Oaks California: SAGE in association with the Open University. ISBN 9780761971566.
- Wetherell, Margaret; Taylor, Stephanie; Yates, Simeon J. (2001). Discourse as data: a guide for analysis. D843 Course: Discourse Analysis. London Thousand Oaks, California: SAGE in association with the Open University. ISBN 9780761971580.
- Wetherell, Margaret (2012). Affect and emotion a new social science understanding. Los Angeles London: SAGE. ISBN 9780857028570.

=== Book chapters ===
- Wetherell, Margaret; Still, Arthur (1998), "Realism and relativism", in Wetherell, Margaret; Sapsford, Roger; Still, Arthur; Miell, Dorothy; Stevens, Richard (eds.), Theory and social psychology, London Thousand Oaks California: SAGE in association with the Open University, pp. 99–114, ISBN 9780761958390.
- Wetherell, Margaret; Still, Arthur (1988), "Discourse analysis and the identification of interpretative repertoires", in Antaki, Charles (ed.), Analysing everyday explanation: a casebook of methods, London Newbury Park, California: SAGE, pp. 168–183, ISBN 9780803981409.
- Wetherell, Margaret; Edley, Nigel (1998), "Gender practices: steps in the analysis of men and masculinities", in Henwood, Karen; Griffin, Christine; Phoenix, Ann (eds.), Standpoints and differences: essays in the practice of feminist psychology, London Thousand Oaks, California: SAGE, pp. 165–173, ISBN 9780761954446.
- Wetherell, Margaret (2001), "Editor's introduction, Part one: foundations and building blocks", in Wetherell, Margaret; Taylor, Stephanie; Yates, Simeon J. (eds.), Discourse theory and practice: a reader, D843 Course: Discourse Analysis, London Thousand Oaks California: SAGE in association with the Open University, pp. 9–13, ISBN 9780761971566.
- Wetherell, Margaret (2001), "Themes in discourse analysis: the case of Diana", in Wetherell, Margaret; Taylor, Stephanie; Yates, Simeon J. (eds.), Discourse theory and practice: a reader, D843 Course: Discourse Analysis, London Thousand Oaks California: SAGE in association with the Open University, pp. 14–28, ISBN 9780761971566.
- Wetherell, Margaret (2001), "Editor's introduction, Part three: minds, selves and sense making", in Wetherell, Margaret; Taylor, Stephanie; Yates, Simeon J. (eds.), Discourse theory and practice: a reader, D843 Course: Discourse Analysis, London Thousand Oaks California: SAGE in association with the Open University, pp. 186–197, ISBN 9780761971566.
- Wetherell, Margaret; Potter, Jonathan (2001), "Unfolding discourse analysis", in Wetherell, Margaret; Taylor, Stephanie; Yates, Simeon J. (eds.), Discourse theory and practice: a reader, D843 Course: Discourse Analysis, London Thousand Oaks California: SAGE in association with the Open University, pp. 198–209, ISBN 9780761971566.
- Wetherell, Margaret (2001), "Debates in discourse research", in Wetherell, Margaret; Taylor, Stephanie; Yates, Simeon J. (eds.), Discourse theory and practice: a reader, D843 Course: Discourse Analysis, London Thousand Oaks California: SAGE in association with the Open University, pp. 380–399, ISBN 9780761971566.

=== Journal articles ===
- Wetherell, Margaret; Potter, Jonathan; Stiven, Hilda (March 1987). "Unequal egalitarianism: a preliminary study of discourses concerning gender and employment opportunities". British Journal of Social Psychology. 26 (1): 59–71. doi:10.1111/j.2044-8309.1987.tb00761.x.
- Wetherell, Margaret (July 1998). "Positioning and interpretative repertoires: conversation analysis and post-structuralism in dialogue" (PDF). Discourse & Society. 9 (3): 387–412. doi:10.1177/0957926598009003005. S2CID 145411889.
- Wetherell, Margaret (June 1999). "Beyond binaries". Theory & Psychology. 9 (3): 399–406. doi:10.1177/0959354399093009. S2CID 220400917.
- Wetherell, Margaret; Edley, Nigel (August 1999). "Negotiating hegemonic masculinity: imaginary positions and psycho-discursive practices" (PDF). Feminism & Psychology. 9 (3): 335–356. doi:10.1177/0959353599009003012. S2CID 145350243.
