= MRDA =

MRDA may refer to:

- Mandy Rice-Davies Applies, a British political aphorism
- Men's Roller Derby Association, the governing body of men's roller derby
- Mitsubishi Motors R&D of America (MRDA), a subdivision of Mitsubishi Motors North America
- Mongko Region Defence Army, an insurgent group in Mongko, Shan State, Myanmar
- Myanmar Royal Dragon Army, an armed resistance organisation in Pale Township, Sagaing Region, Myanmar

== People with the surname ==
- Dragan Mrđa (born 1984), Serbian football player
