= Jonathan Potter =

British psychologist

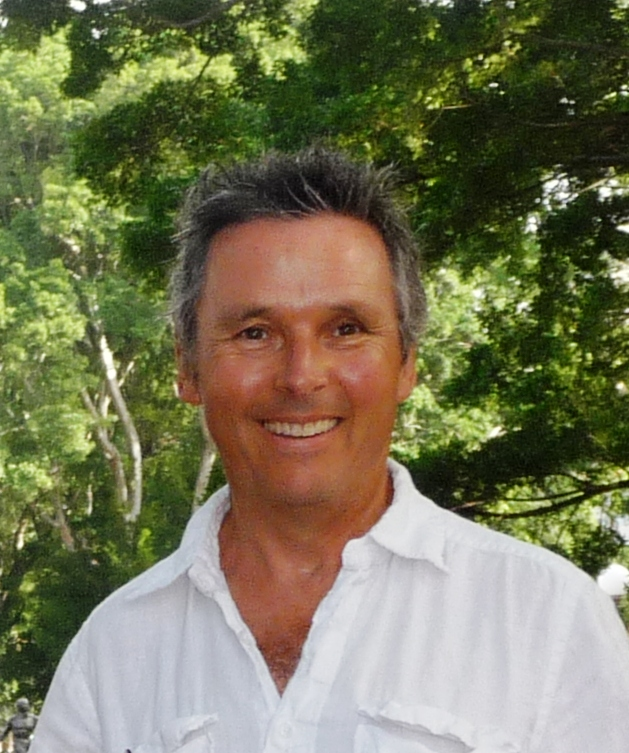
- Potter in 2009
- Born: 8 June 1956 (age 70); Ashford, Kent, England

Academic background
- Education: University of Surrey

Academic work
- Institutions: Loughborough University
- Main interests: Discursive psychology
- Website: Rutgers University

Jonathan Potter (born 8 June 1956) is a British psychologist and Dean of the School of Communication and Information at Rutgers University. He is one of the pioneers of discursive psychology.

== Life ==
Jonathan Potter was born in Ashford, Kent. He studied psychology at the University of Liverpool. During his studies, he became interested in alternative therapies and the emerging critical perspectives in social psychology, influenced by the work of John Shotter, Kenneth Gergen, and Rom Harré.

Potter completed a master's degree in the philosophy of science at the University of Surrey, where he studied speech act theory and post-structuralism, particularly the work of Roland Barthes. His interest in the philosophy of science led him to the new sociology of scientific knowledge, engaging with the work of Harry Collins, Michael Mulkay, and Steve Woolgar.

Potter began a part-time PhD at the University of Surrey, studying the experiences of overseas tourists in Bath. During this period, he met and started living with Margaret Wetherell, a prominent figure in British social psychology.

Potter later transferred to the University of York, working with Michael Mulkay on the sociology of scientific knowledge, focusing on scientific discourse analysis. He completed his DPhil in 1983.

Potter joined the University of St Andrews, where he taught statistics and developed a course on discourse, covering various theories and methods that influenced his later work. He moved to Loughborough University in 1988, and became head of department in 2010.

Since 1996, Potter has lived with and collaborated with Alexa Hepburn. He has conducted workshops and short courses internationally. In 2005, his book Cognition and Conversation (co-edited with Hedwig te Molder) received the inaugural prize of the American Sociological Association's Ethnomethodology and Conversation Analysis section. In 2008, he was elected to the UK Academy of Social Sciences.

== Work ==
In 1984, Jonathan Potter published Social Texts and Context: Literature and Social Psychology with Margaret Wetherell and Peter Stringer. This collaboration developed alongside Potter and Wetherell's PhD research.

Potter co-authored the book Discourse and Social Psychology with Margaret Wetherell, which is a foundational text in the development of a discourse analytic approach to social psychology, now known as discursive psychology. The book introduced new ways to conceptualize fundamental social psychological concepts such as attitudes, categories, social representations, and rules. It has been cited over three thousand times in more than a hundred different journals. One of its key contributions was the development of the analytic notion of 'interpretative repertoires,' adapted from Gilbert and Mulkay's work on scientific discourse, and its application to social psychological topics. A joint grant led by Margaret Wetherell resulted in the 1992 volume Mapping the Language of Racism, which examined how racism is expressed and legitimized in conversations, newspaper articles, and parliamentary debates.

In the early 1990s, Potter and Derek Edwards authored Discursive Psychology. The book challenged core notions in cognitive psychology, particularly memory and attribution, by demonstrating that cognitive processes and events are embedded in and part of language use. For example, they reanalyzed Ulric Neisser's work on the Watergate testimony, showing how John Dean's accounts of his memory were used by counsel in building the case against Richard Nixon.

In 1996, Potter published Representing Reality, which built on his engagement with the sociology of scientific knowledge and other approaches to factuality. The book provided an overview, extension, and critique of social constructionism in the social sciences, developing a discursive version of constructionism in contrast to the more familiar social constructionism of thinkers such as Peter L. Berger and Thomas Luckmann.

Potter co-edited Conversation and Cognition with Hedwig te Molder, a collection that brought together conversation analysts, ethnomethodologists, and discursive psychologists, including Geoff Coulter, John Heritage, Anita Pomerantz, and Robert Hopper.

In 2007, Potter edited a three-volume set of studies in discursive psychology.

== Recent work ==
In a 2010 paper in the British Journal of Social Psychology, Potter summarized and continued the debate over the status of discursive psychology concerning both traditional social psychology and alternative styles of critical work.

== Bibliography ==
=== Books ===
- Potter, Jonathan; Wetherell, Margaret; Stringer, Peter (1984). Social texts and context: literature and social psychology. London Boston: Routledge & Kegan Paul. ISBN 9780710095534.
- Potter, Jonathan; Wetherell, Margaret (1987). Discourse and social psychology: beyond attitudes and behaviour. London Newbury Park, California: SAGE. ISBN 9780803980563.
- Potter, Jonathan; Edwards, Derek (1992). Discursive psychology. London: Sage. ISBN 9780803984431.
- Potter, Jonathan (1996). Representing reality discourse, rhetoric and social construction. London Thousand Oaks, California: SAGE. ISBN 9780803984110.
- Potter, Jonathan; Puchta, Claudia (2004). Focus group practice. London Thousand Oaks, California: SAGE. ISBN 9780761966913.
- Potter, Jonathan; te Molder, Hedwig (2005). Conversation and cognition. Cambridge New York: Cambridge University Press. ISBN 9780521793698.
- Potter, Jonathan (2007). Discourse and psychology: Volumes I, II and III. SAGE Benchmarks in Psychology. Los Angeles: SAGE. ISBN 9781412934039.

=== Book chapters ===
- Potter, Jonathan (2001), "Wittigenstein and Austin", in Wetherell, Margaret; Taylor, Stephanie; Yates, Simeon J. (eds.), Discourse theory and practice: a reader, D843 Course: Discourse Analysis, London Thousand Oaks California: SAGE in association with the Open University, pp. 39–46, ISBN 9780761971566.
- Potter, Jonathan; Wetherell, Margaret (2001), "Unfolding discourse analysis", in Wetherell, Margaret; Taylor, Stephanie; Yates, Simeon J. (eds.), Discourse theory and practice: a reader, D843 Course: Discourse Analysis, London Thousand Oaks California: SAGE in association with the Open University, pp. 198–209, ISBN 9780761971566.
- Potter, Jonathan; Speer, Susan A. (2002), "From performatives to practices: Judith Butler, discursive psychology, and the management of heterosexist talk", in McIlvenny, Paul (ed.), Talking gender and sexuality, Amsterdam Philadelphia: John Benjamins, pp. 151–180, ISBN 9789027251145.
- Potter, Jonathan; Puchta, Claudia (2007), "Mind, mousse and moderation", in Hepburn, Alexa; Wiggins, Sally (eds.), Discursive research in practice: new approaches to psychology and interaction, Cambridge New York: Cambridge University Press, pp. 104–124, ISBN 9780521614092.
- Potter, Jonathan; Speer, Susan A. (2007), "The management of heterosexist talk: Conversational resources and prejudiced claims", in Potter, Jonathan (ed.), Discourse and psychology: Volume II, SAGE Benchmarks in Psychology, Los Angeles: SAGE, ISBN 9781412934039.
- Potter, Jonathan; Stokoe, Elizabeth (2010), "Interrogating tears: Some uses of "tag questions" in a child-protection helpline", in Freed, Alice; Ehrlich, Susan (eds.), Why do you ask? the function of questions in institutional discourse, Oxford New York: Oxford University Press, pp. 108–132, ISBN 9780195306903.

=== Journal articles ===
- Potter, Jonathan; Wetherell, Margaret; Stiven, Hilda (March 1987). "Unequal egalitarianism: A preliminary study of discourses concerning gender and employment opportunities". British Journal of Social Psychology. 26 (1): 59–71. doi:10.1111/j.2044-8309.1987.tb00761.x.
- Potter, Jonathan; Speer, Susan A. (October 2000). "The management of heterosexist talk: conversational resources and prejudiced claims". Discourse & Society. 11 (4): 543–572. doi:10.1177/0957926500011004005. S2CID 141983471.
- Potter, Jonathan (August 2002). "Two kinds of natural". Discourse Studies. 4 (4): 539–542. doi:10.1177/14614456020040040901. S2CID 143700255.

A response to: Speer, Susan A. (August 2002). "'Natural' and 'contrived' data: a sustainable distinction?". Discourse Studies. 4 (4): 511–525. doi:10.1177/14614456020040040601. S2CID 145705373.

Rejoinder: Speer, Susan A. (August 2002). "Transcending the 'natural'/'contrived' distinction: a rejoinder to ten Have, Lynch and Potter". Discourse Studies. 4 (4): 543–548. doi:10.1177/14614456020040041001. S2CID 144543307.

- Potter, Jonathan (December 2010). "Contemporary discursive psychology: Issues, prospects, and Corcoran's awkward ontology". British Journal of Social Psychology. 49 (4): 657–678. doi:10.1348/014466610X486158. PMID 20178684.
- Potter, Jonathan (December 2012). "Arsène didn't see it: Coaching, research and the promise of a discursive psychology: A commentary" (PDF). International Journal of Sports Science and Coaching. 7 (4): 629–633. doi:10.1260/1747-9541.7.4.615. S2CID 73627186.

A response to: Miller, Paul K. (December 2012). "Arsène didn't see it: Coaching, research and the promise of a discursive psychology" (PDF). International Journal of Sports Science and Coaching. 7 (4): 615–635. doi:10.1260/1747-9541.7.4.615. S2CID 73627186. Pdf of pp. 615–646.
