= Bethan Benwell =

British linguist

- Born: 4 August 1971 (age 55)

Academic work
- Main interests: The relationship between discourse and identity
- Notable works: Discourse and Identity

Notes
- Senior Lecturer in English Language and Linguistics, University of Stirling

Bethan Benwell (born 4 August 1971), is a British linguist. She has been a senior lecturer in English Language and Linguistics, for the Division of Literature and Languages, at the University of Stirling since 2008.

She was co-investigator on an AHRC-funded project (2007–2010): Devolving Diasporas: Migration and Reception in Central Scotland, 1980–present with James Procter (Newcastle University), Gemma Robinson (University of Stirling), and Jackie Kay (Newcastle University).

Her book, Discourse and Identity, which was co-authored with Elizabeth Stokoe, was nominated for the British Association for Applied Linguistics (BAAL) Book Prize in 2007.

== Bibliography ==
=== Books ===
- Benwell, Bethan (2003). Masculinity and men's lifestyle magazines. Oxford, UK Malden, Massachusetts, USA: Blackwell Pub./Sociological Review. ISBN 9781405114639.
- Benwell, Bethan; Stokoe, Elizabeth (2006). Discourse and identity. Edinburgh: Edinburgh University Press. ISBN 9780748617500.
- Benwell, Bethan; Procter, James; Robinson, Gemma (2012). Postcolonial audiences: readers, viewers and reception. New York: Routledge. ISBN 9780415888714.
- Benwell, Bethan; Procter, James (2015). Reading across worlds: transnational book groups and the reception of difference. Houndmills, Basingstoke, Hampshire New York City: Palgrave Macmillan. ISBN 9781137276391.

=== Chapters in books ===
- Benwell, Bethan (2002), "Introduction: masculinity and men's lifestyle magazines", in Litosseliti, Lia; Sunderland, Jane (eds.), Gender identity and discourse analysis, Philadelphia, Pennsylvania: John Benjamins Publishing Co., pp. 149–174, ISBN 9789027226921. Online.
- Benwell, Bethan (2002), "Elusive masculinities: Locating the male in the men's lifestyle magazine", in Sanchez-Macarro, Antonia (ed.), Windows on the world: media discourse in English, English in the World, Vol. 1, València: Universitat de València, pp. 41–62, ISBN 9788437054469.
- Benwell, Bethan (2003), "Introduction: masculinity and men's lifestyle magazines", in Benwell, Bethan (ed.), Masculinity and men's lifestyle magazines, Oxford, UK Malden, Massachusetts, USA: Blackwell Pub./Sociological Review, pp. 6–29, ISBN 9781405114639.
- Benwell, Bethan (2003), "Ambiguous masculinities: heroism and anti-heroism in the men's lifestyle magazine", in Benwell, Bethan (ed.), Masculinity and men's lifestyle magazines, Oxford, UK Malden, Massachusetts, USA: Blackwell Pub./Sociological Review, pp. 151–168, ISBN 9781405114639.
- Benwell, Bethan (2005), "University students resisting academic identity", in Richards, Keith; Seedhouse, Paul (eds.), Applying conversation analysis, Houndmills, Basingstoke, Hampshire New York: Palgrave Macmillan, pp. 124–140, ISBN 9781403942333.
- Benwell, Bethan (2010), "Masculinity and men's magazines", in Simpson, Paul; Mayr, Andrea (eds.), Language and power: a resource book for students, London New York City: Routledge, pp. 172–179, ISBN 9780415468992.
- Benwell, Bethan; Stokoe, Elizabeth (2010), "University students resisting academic identity", in Griffiths, Patrick; Merrison, Andrew John; Bloomer, Aileen (eds.), Language in use: a reader, London New York: Routledge, pp. 82–97, ISBN 9780415442046.
- Benwell, Bethan; Stokoe, Elizabeth (2010), "Analysing identity in interaction: contrasting discourse, genealogical, narrative and conversation analysis", in Wetherell, Margaret; Mohanty, Chandra Talpade (eds.), The sage handbook of identities, Thousand Oaks, California: SAGE, pp. 82–104, ISBN 9781412934114.
- Benwell, Bethan; Procter, James; Robinson, Gemma (2012), "Introduction", in Benwell, Bethan; Procter, James; Robinson, Gemma (eds.), Postcolonial audiences: readers, viewers and reception, New York: Routledge, pp. 1–23, ISBN 9781138851559.
- Benwell, Bethan; Procter, James; Robinson, Gemma (2012), ""That may be where I come from but that's not how I read": diaspora, location and reading identities", in Benwell, Bethan; Procter, James; Robinson, Gemma (eds.), Postcolonial audiences: readers, viewers and reception, New York: Routledge, pp. 43–56, ISBN 9781138851559.
- Benwell, Bethan; Allington, Daniel (2012), "Reading the reading experience: an ethnomethodological approach to "booktalk"", in Lang, Anouk (ed.), From codex to hypertext: reading at the turn of the twenty-first century, Amherst: University of Massachusetts Press, pp. 217–233, ISBN 9781558499539.
- Benwell, Bethan (2014), "Language and masculinity", in Ehrlich, Susan; Meyerhoff, Miriam; Holmes, Janet (eds.), The handbook of language, gender, and sexuality (2nd ed.), Chichester, West Sussex: Wiley-Blackwell, pp. 240–259, ISBN 9780470656426.
- Benwell, Bethan; Beynon, John (2015), "Masculinity and the media", in Donsbach, Wolfgang (ed.), The concise encyclopedia of communication, Chichester, West Sussex, UK Malden, Massachusetts, USA: International Communication Association and Wiley-Blackwell, p. 341, ISBN 9781118789308.

=== Journal articles ===
- Benwell, Bethan (1999). "The organisation of knowledge in British university tutorial discourse: Issues, pedagogic discourse strategies and disciplinary identity". Pragmatics. 9 (4): 535–565. doi:10.1075/prag.9.4.06ben.
- Benwell, Bethan (Spring 2001). "Male gossip and language play in the letters pages of men's lifestyle magazines". The Journal of Popular Culture. 34 (4): 19–33. doi:10.1111/j.0022-3840.2001.3404_19.x.
- Benwell, Bethan (July 2004). "Ironic discourse: evasive masculinity in men's lifestyle magazines". Men and Masculinities. 7 (1): 3–21. doi:10.1177/1097184X03257438. S2CID 145210684.
- Benwell, Bethan (March 2005). ""Lucky this is anonymous!" Men's magazines and ethnographies of reading: A textual culture approach". Discourse and Society. 16 (2): 147–172. doi:10.1177/0957926505049616. hdl:1893/13065. S2CID 144963267.
- Benwell, Bethan (2007). "New sexism? Readers' responses to the use of irony in men's magazines" (PDF). Journalism Studies. 8 (4): 539–549. doi:10.1080/14616700701411797. hdl:1893/13077. S2CID 18568206.
- Benwell, Bethan (August 2009). "'A pathetic and racist and awful character': ethnomethodological approaches to the reception of diasporic fiction". Language and Literature. 18 (3): 300–315. doi:10.1177/0963947009105855. S2CID 145670068.
- Benwell, Bethan; Procter, James; Robinson, Gemma (Winter 2011). "Not reading "Brick Lane"". New Formations: A Journal of Culture, Theory & Politics. 73 (73): 64–90. doi:10.3898/NEWF.73.06.2011. S2CID 144465250. Pdf.
- Benwell, Bethan (December 2011). "Masculine identity and identification as ethnomethodological phenomena: revisiting Cameron and Kulick". Gender and Language. 5 (2): 187–211. doi:10.1558/genl.v5i2.187.
- Benwell, Bethan (July 2012). "Common-sense anti-racism in book group talk: The role of reported speech". Discourse & Society. 23 (4): 359–376. doi:10.1177/0957926512441106. hdl:1893/13073. S2CID 143966075.
- Benwell, Bethan; Stokoe, Elizabeth; Attenborough, Frederick (June 2013). "University students managing engagement, preparation, knowledge and achievement: Interactional evidence from institutional, domestic and virtual settings". Learning, Culture and Social Interaction. 2 (2): 75–90. doi:10.1016/j.lcsi.2013.01.001. Pdf.

=== Book reviews ===
- Benwell, Bethan (November 2000). "Review of: Star Authors: Literary Celebrity in America, Joe Moran, London/Sterling, Virginia: Pluto Press, 2000, 192 pp, ISBN 9780745315195". Media, Culture & Society. 22 (6): 853–855. doi:10.1177/016344300022006010. S2CID 220925410.
- Benwell, Bethan (May 2002). "Review of: Good To Talk?: Living and Working in a Communication Culture, Deborah Cameron, London: Sage, 2000, 213 pp., ISBN 9780761957713". Media, Culture & Society. 24 (3): 443–444. doi:10.1177/016344370202400310. S2CID 144483570.
- Benwell, Bethan (May 2004). "Review of: Making Sense of Men's Magazines, Peter Jackson, Nick Stevenson and Kate Brooks, London: Polity, 2001, 224 pp, ISBN 9780745621753". Media, Culture & Society. 26 (3): 459–461. doi:10.1177/0163443704042563. S2CID 220930451.
- Benwell, Bethan (February 2007). "Review of: The Sociolinguistics of Narrative, Joanna Thornborrow and Jennifer Coates, Amsterdam / Philadelphia: John Benjamins Pub. Co., 2005, 299 pp, ISBN 9781588116352". Journal of Sociolinguistics. 11 (1): 116–121. doi:10.1111/j.1467-9841.2007.00312_7.x.
- Benwell, Bethan (2007). "Review of: Speaking Out: The Female Voice in Public Contexts, Dr. Judith Baxter, Basingstoke, Palgrave Macmillan, 2006, 288 pp. ISBN 9781403994080". Journal of Gender Studies. 16 (2): 192–194. doi:10.1080/09589230701334388. S2CID 216137306.
