= Michael Billig =

British academic

- Born: 8 September 1947 (age 79); London
- Education: University of Bristol
- Known for: rhetorical psychology
- Awards: Fellow of the British Academy
- Scientific career
- Fields: Social psychology
- Workplaces: University of Birmingham, Loughborough University
- Thesis: Social categorization and intergroup relations (1972)
- Doctoral advisor: Henri Tajfel

Michael Billig (born 1947) is a British academic and social psychologist. He is Emeritus Professor of Social Sciences at Loughborough University, working principally in contemporary social psychology although much of his work crosses disciplinary boundaries in the social sciences.

== Early life and education ==
Billig was born in 1947 to a Jewish family from London. His father's brother was Levi Billig and his father's sister was Hannah Billig. Michael Billig went to the University of Bristol to study Philosophy and Psychology. While at Bristol he was taught by Professor Henri Tajfel, a renowned social psychologist, who was to have an enduring and profound influence on Billig. After Billig obtained his undergraduate degree in 1968, he was encouraged by Tajfel to stay at Bristol and work as Tajfel's research assistant in an experimental project on intergroup relations. Billig also registered for a doctoral degree under Tajfel's supervision, and he obtained his doctorate from Bristol University in 1972.

== Career ==
As Tajfel's research assistant, Billig's task was to help design, conduct and analyse the first so-called minimal group experiments which examined how people will favour members of their own group and discriminate against members of an outgroup, even when these groups were deliberately artificial and meaningless. These experiments were to become foundational to the approach of social identity theory. In 1973 Billig was appointed to a lectureship in psychology at the University of Birmingham. Even before he left Bristol, he was moving away from experimental work to considering issues of power, political extremism and ideology. He wrote a series of important books exploring these topics.

He held visiting professor positions at Temple University, Philadelphia (1991), University of California-Santa Barbara (1992) and the Sapienza University of Rome (1996)

== Work ==
His Social Psychology and Intergroup Relations (1976) offered a critique of orthodox approaches to the study prejudice in psychology and criticised approaches that concentrated on individuals and neglected group contexts. Billig became interested in studying the far-right and realised that an experimental approach would be inappropriate. Fascists (1978) revealed the classic fascist and antisemitic ideology underlying the UK's National Front at a time when it was bidding for political legitimacy and electoral success. Billig also wrote a pamphlet, Psychology, Racism and Fascism (1979), published by the anti-fascist Searchlight magazine. In this pamphlet he exposed links between far-right groups and some psychologists who were seeking to prove that there were biological differences between the intellectual capacities of different so-called 'races'. The pamphlet was extended into a full-length book, L'Internationale Raciste (1981), which also looked at European links between psychology and the extreme-right . L'Internationale Raciste was published in French and German, but not in English.

In the 1980s Billig's focus shifted to everyday thinking and the relationship between ideology and common sense (Ideology and Social Psychology, 1982). This strand of work became more pronounced after he moved to Loughborough University in 1985 to become professor of Social Science in the multidisciplinary department of Social Sciences. He became interested in highlighting and reinvigorating the use of classical rhetoric to explore thinking in the context of social issues. For example, he suggests that attitudes are best understood not as individual positions on topics, but as rhetorical stances in argumentative contexts. This perspective was introduced in his book Arguing and Thinking (1987; 2nd Edition, 1996).

Ideological Dilemmas (1988), which was collectively written with his Loughborough colleagues, Condor, Edwards, Gane, Middleton and Radley, argued that if you look closely at the ways people justify and criticise, it is possible to see how common sense and everyday thinking are not marked by consistency as many social psychologists suppose. At Loughborough he was a founding member of the influential Discourse and Rhetoric Group, which included figures such as Derek Edwards and Jonathan Potter. The group, which stressed that psychologists should examine in detail the way language is used, was central to the creation of discursive psychology.

One feature of Billig's work is the variety of topics that he has worked on. For example, he studied views about the British royalty in Talking of the Royal Family (1998, 2nd Edition). Banal Nationalism, probably Billig's most well known, and certainly his most cited book, threw new light on the topic of nationalism, by examining the small and largely unnoticed details of the ways that nation-states are routinely reproduced. His Freudian Repression (1999) reinterpreted psychoanalytic theory in terms of conversation, while Laughter and Ridicule (2005) suggested that humour, in the form of ridicule, had an important, disciplinary function in society. The Politics and Rhetoric of Political Celebration, written in collaboration with Cristina Marinho, examined the language used in the Portuguese parliament.

Billig's work often has a historical and cultural dimension. The Hidden Roots of Critical Psychology (2008) sought to expand conventional histories of psychology by arguing that in the eighteenth century the Third Earl of Shaftesbury and Thomas Reid formulated ideas about the mind that today are being proposed by critical psychologists. Rock'n'Roll Jews (2000) focused on the crucial, creative contribution of Jews in the early years of rock'n'roll. According to Billig, the specifically Jewish dimension is often overlooked by those studying the history of rock music.

More recently, Billig has been critically examining the ways that social scientists write. Learn to Write Badly (2013) criticised social scientists for using too much jargon. Billig argued that, when it comes to describing human actions, heavy technical nouns are, in fact, often less precise than ordinary language. He developed these themes in More Examples, Less Theory (2019), which claims that psychologists and other social scientists today accord theory too much importance. Billig suggests that researchers should try to examine real-life examples directly, rather than through the oversimplifying lens of theory. In this book, Billig proposed Marie Jahoda as the example that psychologists today should try to follow on account of her clear writing, social commitment, scepticism of theory and use of well-chosen examples.

Billig has collaborated with Cristina Marinho, who was a doctoral student at Loughborough University and is a lecturer at Edinburgh University. Together thay wrote The Politics and Rhetoric of Commemoration. In this book they examined in detail how the Portuguese Revolution of 1974 was celebrated annually in the Portuguese Parliament, with some politicians using complex rhetoric to avoid appearing as if they had doubts about the Revolution.

In Politicians Manipulating Statistics, Billig and Marinho examined the ways that politicians can mis-use public statistics for political gain and how the official statistical authorities try to step them from doing this. The book paid particular attention to the statistical authorities of the United Kingdom and of France, but also paid attention to the political manipulation of statistics from around the world. The book crossed different academic disciplines. It was even reviewed in Nature.

Billig retired in 2017 and was appointed emeritus professor at Loughborough University.

== Awards ==
- 2023: Lifetime Achievement Award, British Psychological Society
- 2020: Fellow of the British Academy
- 2010: Distinguished Contribution to Social Psychology Award, Social Psychology Section British Psychological Society
- Erik Erikson Award, International Society of Political Psychology
- 1996: Gustavus Myers Outstanding Book Award

== Bibliography ==
- Billig, M. (1976). Social Psychology and Intergroup Relations. London: Academic Press.
- Billig, M. (1978). Fascists: A social psychological view of the National Front. London: Academic Press.
- Billig, M. (1979). Psychology, Racism & Fascism. A.F. & R. Publications. A Searchlight pamphlet.
- Billig, M. (1981). L'internationale raciste: de la psychologie a la "science" des races. Paris: Maspero
- Billig, M. (1982). Ideology and Social Psychology. Oxford: Basil Blackwell.
- Billig, M. (1987). Arguing and Thinking: a rhetorical approach to social psychology. Cambridge: Cambridge University Press.
- Billig, M., Condor, S., Edwards, D., Gane, M., Middleton, D. and Radley, A.R. (1988). Ideological Dilemmas. London: Sage Publications.
- Billig, M. (1991). Ideology and opinions: Studies in rhetorical psychology. SAGE Publications Limited.
- Billig, M. (1995). Banal Nationalism. London: Sage Publications.
- Billig, M. (1996). Arguing and Thinking: a rhetorical approach to social psychology, revised edition. Cambridge: Cambridge University Press. (Italian edition: Discutere e Pensare: un approccio retorico alla psicologia sociale. Milan: Raffaello Cortina, 1999).
- Billig, M. (1998). Talking of the Royal Family: second edition with new introduction. London: Routledge.
- Billig, M. (1999). Freudian Repression: conversation creating the unconscious. Cambridge: Cambridge University Press. ISBN 0-521-65956-6
- Billig, M. (2000). Rock’n’Roll Jews. Nottingham: Five Leaves/ New York: Syracuse University Press.
- Billig, M. (2005). Laughter and Ridicule: toward a social critique of humour. London: Sage.
- Billig, M. (2008). The Hidden Roots of Critical Psychology: Understanding the Impact of Locke, Shaftesbury and Reid. London: Sage.
- Billig, M. (2013). Learn to Write Badly: How to Succeed in the Social Sciences. Cambridge: Cambridge University Press. ISBN 978-1107676985
- Billig, M. and C. Marinho (2017). The Politics and Rhetoric of Commemoration: how the Portuguese parliament celebrates the 1974 Revolution. London: Bloomsbury.
- Billig, M. (2019). More Examples, Less Theory: historical studies of writing psychology. Cambridge: Cambridge University Press.
- Billig, M. and C. Marinho (2025). Politicians Manipulating Statistics: how they do it and how to stop them. Cambridge: Cambridge University Press.
