= Dorothy Miell =

Professor of Social Psychology

Dorothy Miell OBE, FRSE
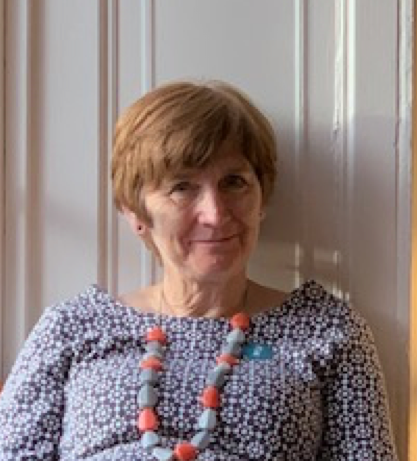

Academic background
- Education: Bradford Girls Grammar School, University of Lancaster

Academic work
- Institutions: University of Edinburgh
- Main interests: Social psychology
- Website: University of Edinburgh

Dorothy Evelyn Miell OBE FRSE is a professor of Social Psychology. Since March 2010, she has been Head of the College of Arts, Humanities and Social Sciences, and Vice-Principal, at the University of Edinburgh. Before moving to Edinburgh, she was Dean of Social Sciences at the Open University. Her research focuses on collaboration and communication patterns, recently in the context of creative endeavors.

Miell is a Fellow of the Royal Society of Edinburgh and a Fellow of the British Psychological Society. She was President of the British Psychological Society from 2014 to 2015. She is Vice-Chair of the Board of Directors on Scottish Opera and a member of the Council of the Edinburgh International Festival. She is a Governor of the Royal Conservatoire of Scotland

She was appointed Officer of the Order of the British Empire (OBE) in the 2019 Birthday Honours for services to higher education and psychology.

== Selected bibliography ==
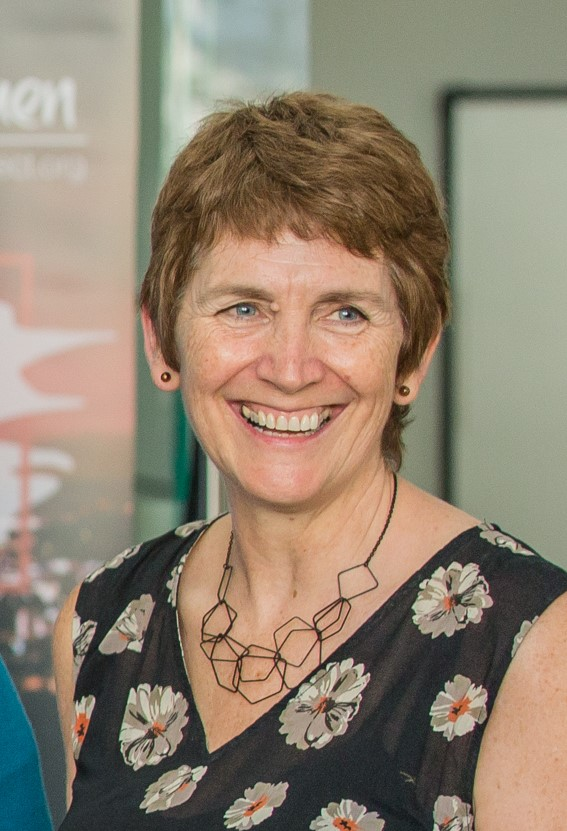
Dorothy Miell at Institute for Advanced Studies in the Humanities at the University of Edinburgh

=== Books ===
- Miell, Dorothy; Dallos, Rudi (1996). Social interaction and personal relationships. London Thousand Oaks, California: SAGE in association with the Open University. ISBN 9780761950363.
- Miell, Dorothy; Sapsford, Roger; Still, Arthur; Wetherell, Margaret; Stevens, Richard (1998). Theory and social psychology. London Thousand Oaks California: SAGE in association with the Open University. ISBN 9780761958390.
- Miell, Dorothy; Wetherell, Margaret (1998). Doing social psychology. London Thousand Oaks, California: SAGE in association with the Open University. ISBN 9780761960492.
- Miell, Dorothy; MacDonald, Raymond; Hargreaves, David J. (2005). Musical communication. Oxford New York: Oxford University Press. ISBN 9780198529361.
- Miell, Dorothy; Phoenix, Ann; Thomas, Kerry (2007). Mapping psychology. DSE212 Course: Exploring Psychology. Milton Keynes: Open University. ISBN 9781780074986.
- Miell, Dorothy; MacDonald, Raymond; Hargreaves, David (2012). Musical imaginations: multidisciplinary perspectives on creativity, performance, and perception. Oxford: Oxford University Press. ISBN 9780199568086.
