= Walter Kintsch =

American psychologist and academic (1932–2023)

- Born: May 30, 1932; Timișoara, Timiș County, Romania
- Died: March 24, 2023 (aged 90)
- Education: University of Kansas (PhD)
- Occupations: Psychologist; academic
- Awards: APA Award for Distinguished Scientific Contributions to Psychology (1992)

Walter Kintsch (May 30, 1932 – March 24, 2023) was an American psychologist and academic who was professor emeritus of psychology at the University of Colorado Boulder. He was known for his theories in cognitive psychology, especially in relation to text comprehension.

== Biography ==
Walter Kintsch was born in Timișoara, raised in Austria, and received his PhD at the University of Kansas in 1960. He died on March 24, 2023, at the age of 90.

== Research ==
His research focus was on how people understand language, using both experimental methods and computational modeling techniques. He formulated a psychological process theory of discourse comprehension that views comprehension as a bottom-up process in which various alternatives are explored in parallel, resulting in an incoherent intermediate mental representation that is then cleaned up by an integration process. Integration is a constraint satisfaction process that ensures that constructions that are linked together become strongly activated, whereas contradictory and irrelevant elements become deactivated. Kintsch details the Construction-Integration (CI) model in Comprehension: A Paradigm for Cognition.

== Awards ==
In 1992 he won the APA Award for Distinguished Scientific Contributions to Psychology.

He was honored by the Federation of Associations in Behavioral & Brain Sciences as one of the "scientists who have made important and lasting contributions to the sciences of mind, brain, and behavior".

He was awarded an honorary doctorate from the Humboldt University of Berlin in 2001.

== Selected publications ==
=== Books ===
- Learning, Memory and Conceptual Processes, Wiley, 1972 (ISBN 978-0471480716)
- Memory and Cognition, Wiley, 1977 (ISBN 978-0471480723)
- Comprehension: A Paradigm for Cognition, Cambridge University Press, 1998 (ISBN 978-0521629867)
- The Representation of Meaning in Memory, Erlbaum, 1974 (ISBN 978-0-470-48074-8)

=== Articles ===
- Kintsch, Walter; van Dijk, Teun A. (September 1978). "Toward a model of text comprehension and production". Psychological Review. 85 (5): 363–394. doi:10.1037/0033-295X.85.5.363. S2CID 1825457.
- Kintsch, Walter (1988). "The role of knowledge in discourse comprehension: A construction-integration model". Psychological Review. 95 (2): 163–182. doi:10.1037/0033-295X.95.2.163. PMID 3375398.
