= Janet Holmes (linguist) =

New Zealand sociolinguist

Janet Holmes ONZM
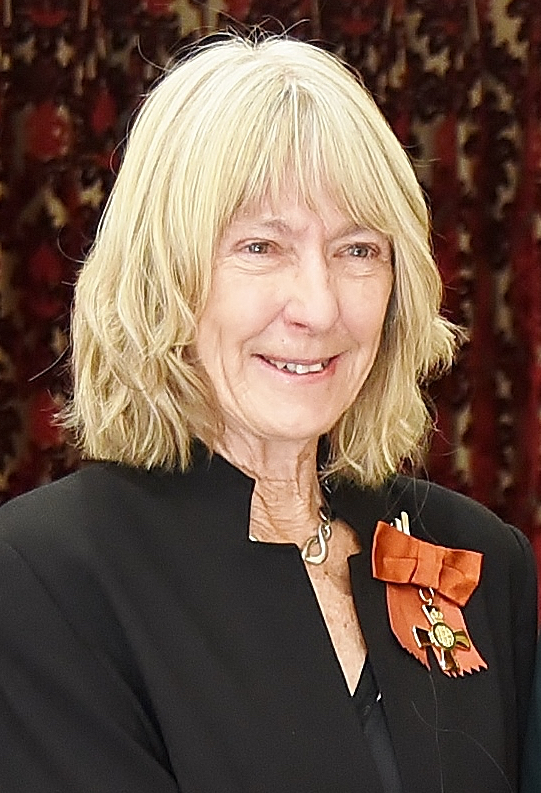
- Holmes in 2016
- Born: 17 May 1947 (age 79); Liverpool, England
- Citizenship: New Zealand
- Education: University of Leeds
- Scientific career
- Workplaces: Victoria University of Wellington
- Thesis: The language of spoken monologue: an analysis of topic and narrative structure. (1970)

Janet Holmes ONZM (born 17 May 1947) is a New Zealand sociolinguist. Her research interests include language and gender, language in the workplace, and New Zealand English.

== Academic career ==
After obtaining an MPhil at the University of Leeds, Holmes moved to Victoria University of Wellington in New Zealand, later becoming a naturalised New Zealander in 1975. She published a textbook Introduction to Sociolinguistics in 1992 which has run to five editions. She is a Fellow of the Royal Society of New Zealand and won the Dame Joan Metge Medal in 2012. She is now an emeritus professor of linguistics at Victoria University of Wellington, New Zealand. Holmes has published widely on an array of topics. In 1996, she established the Wellington Language in the Workplace (LWP) project, which is an ongoing study of communication formats occurring in the workplace, which examines “small talk, humour, management strategies, directives, and leadership in a wide range of New Zealand workplaces”.

Holmes has been featured on the media, such as the Radio New Zealand and newspapers. Topics she talked about included the way people communicate at work, how complicated the phenomenon of sexist language is, the pitfalls and possibilities of cross-cultural communication in the workplace, or whether men or women talk more.

== Recognition ==
In recognition of Holmes' contributions to the field of Sociolinguistics, Linguist at Work: Festschrift for Janet Holmes brings together works by Holmes's colleagues, students, collaborators, and friends which present new ideas and analysis within the field. In the 2016 New Year Honours, Holmes was appointed an Officer of the New Zealand Order of Merit for services to linguistics.

In 2017, Holmes was selected as one of the Royal Society Te Apārangi's "150 women in 150 words", celebrating the contributions of women to knowledge in New Zealand.

In July 2019, Holmes was conferred with an honorary Doctor of Letters degree by the University of Warwick.

== Publications ==
- 2017 Holmes, Janet and Nick Wilson An Introduction to Sociolinguistics. (5th edition). London: Pearson.
- 2015 Holmes, Janet and Maria Stubbe (2nd edition) Power and Politeness in the Workplace. London and New York: Routledge.
- 2014 Holmes, Janet and Kirk Hazen (eds.) Research Methods in Sociolinguistics: A Practical Guide. Oxford/Malden MA: Wiley Blackwell.
- 2014 Ehrlich, Susan, Miriam Meyerhoff and Janet Holmes (eds.) The Handbook of Language, Gender and Sexuality. Oxford/Malden: Wiley-Blackwell.
- 2013 Holmes, Janet. An Introduction to Sociolinguistics. Fourth Edition. London: Pearson.
- 2011 Holmes, Janet, Meredith Marra and Bernadette Vine Leadership, Discourse and Ethnicity. Oxford University Press.
- 2011 Laurie Bauer, Dianne Bardsley, Janet Holmes and Paul Warren Q and Eh: Questions and Answer on Language with a Kiwi Twist.
- Holmes, J. (2008). An Introduction to Sociolinguistics (3rd ed.). Pearson Longman, Harlow, England
- 2006 Holmes, Janet Gendered Talk at Work: Constructing Gender Identity through Workplace Discourse. New York, Oxford: Blackwell.
- 2006 Laurie Bauer, Janet Holmes and Paul Warren. Language Matters. Palgrave Macmillan.
- 2003 Holmes, Janet and Maria Stubbe. Power and Politeness in the Workplace: a Sociolinguistic Analysis of Talk at Work. London: Pearson.
- 2002. Holmes, J. and M. Marra. "Having a laugh at work: How humour contributes to workplace culture," Journal of pragmatics,34(12): 1683–1710
- 2000 Editor. Gendered Speech in Social Context: Perspectives from Gown and Town. Wellington: Victoria University Press.
- 1995. Holmes, Janet. Women, Men and Politeness. Harlow: Addison, Wesley, Longman.
- 1988. Holmes, Janet. "Paying compliments: A sex-preferential politeness strategy," Journal of Pragmatics. 12(4): 445–465.
- 1984. Holmes, Janet. "Modifying illocutionary force," Journal of Pragmatics. 8(3): 345–365.
