= Discourse & Communication =

- Discipline: Communication
- Language: English
- Edited by: Jo Angouri

Publication details
- History: 2007-present
- Publisher: SAGE Publications
- Frequency: Quarterly
- Impact factor: 0.939 (2011)

Standard abbreviations
- ISO 4: Discourse Commun.

Indexing
- ISSN: 1750-4813 (print); 1750-4821 (web)
- LCCN: 2007206019
- OCLC no.: 644333053

Links
- Journal homepage; Online access; Online archive

Discourse & Communication is a quarterly peer-reviewed academic journal that covers the fields of discourse analysis and social communication by focusing on topics in communication analyzed with discourse analytical methods. The journal was established in 2007 by Teun A. van Dijk, and edited by Jo Angouri.

== Scope ==
The journal concentrates on the cross-disciplinary fields of discourse studies and communication studies, with a particular focus on qualitative, discourse analytical study of organizational and mass communication. General studies of discourse are published in its sister journal, Discourse Studies, and articles on the sociopolitical role of discourse are published in its other sister journal Discourse & Society.

== Abstracting and indexing ==
Discourse & Communication is abstracted and indexed in Scopus and the Social Sciences Citation Index. According to the Journal Citation Reports, its 2011 impact factor is 0.939, ranking it 31st out of 72 journals in the category "Communication".
