= Alexa Hepburn =

British professor

Alexa Hepburn is professor of communication at Rutgers University, and honorary professor in conversation analysis in the Social Sciences Department at Loughborough University.

== Life ==
Hepburn was born in Leicester. Because her father was a telecoms engineer she moved between twelve different schools in the North of England and Scotland. She did an undergraduate degree in Philosophy and Psychology at the University of Dundee. She did her PhD at Glasgow Caledonian University supervised by Gerda Siann. This focused on school bullying, with a particular interest in the way that traditional research had isolated pupils and their problematic personalities, rather than seeing them as part of a broader system of relationships, including teachers and parents. This was combined with a poststructuralist approach to psychological methods, to power, and to the nature of persons.

Hepburn was awarded her PhD in 1995 and she held teaching positions at Napier University, Staffordshire University and then Nottingham Trent University. After being a Leverhulme Fellow in 2002 she was appointed to a lectureship and then senior lectureship at Loughborough University. In 2009 she was promoted to Reader in Conversation Analysis, and in 2015 to Professor of Conversation Analysis. In September 2015 she took up a position of Research Professor in the Communication Department at Rutgers University.https://comminfo.rutgers.edu/hepburn-alexa

== Work ==
Her early research combined her interests in critical psychology and theory with an empirical examination of school bullying. She explored the relationship between Derrida's deconstruction and the nature of psychology and considered the implications of relativism for feminism. Her work was influenced by, and influenced, the approach known as discursive psychology.

Her critical concerns were brought together in her Introduction to Critical Social Psychology published in 2003. This integrated and evaluated critical work inspired by Marxism, poststructuralism, feminism and discourse analysis.

In the years after this she was heavily involved in editing two collections jointly with Sally Wiggins, one a special issue of the journal Discourse and Society and the other a volume for Cambridge University Press, Discursive Research in Practice.

From 2005 she has undergone extensive training in conversation analysis, attending workshops taught by Emanuel Schegloff, John Heritage and Gene Lerner in UCLA and masters level modules in conversation analysis at the University of York taught by Celia Kitzinger.

Since 2000 she has been working with a large corpus of phone calls to the UK National Society for the Prevention of Cruelty to Children child protection helpline, originally collected as part of her Leverhulme Fellowship. Her work focused on the way the calls are opened, the way emotion is expressed and responded to, and the way shared understandings are developed and contested in the course of sequences of advice. This programme of work has resulted in a series of articles. Much of this work is collaborative with Jonathan Potter.

She has become expert in transcription and has developed Gail Jefferson's basic system for transcribing talk to encompass phenomena associated with crying and upset (sobbing, sniffing, tremulous delivery). This is part of a broader concern with the way emotion becomes something live in interaction.

== Developments ==
Her work has focused on interaction in family mealtimes involving young children. This involved video recordings of meals and studying basic actions such as requests, directives, admonishments and threats.

In addition to these topics she has been involved in a series of studies of the role of tag questions in interaction. Her focus has been on the way tag questions can be used to both build and contest intersubjectivity.

She has also been working on technical features of indexical repair - conversational moments where speakers 'fix' their own talk before another speaker can take their turn.

A joint paper in 2022 looked at the different meanings of the word "right" when used by speakers in the UK and the US.

== Publications ==
- Hepburn, A. (1999). Derrida and Psychology: Deconstruction and its ab/uses in critical and discursive psychologies, Theory and Psychology, 9 (5), 641-667.
- Hepburn, A. (2003). An Introduction to Critical Social Psychology. London: Sage.
- Hepburn, A. (2004). Crying: Notes on description, transcription and interaction, Research on Language and Social Interaction, 37, 251-90.,
- Hepburn, A. and Wiggins, S. (Eds.)(2005). Developments in discursive psychology, Discourse & Society (special issue) 16(5).
- Hepburn, A. and Wiggins, S. (Eds.) (2007). Discursive research in practice: New approaches to psychology and interaction. Cambridge: Cambridge University Press.
- Hepburn, A. and Potter, J. (2010). Interrogating tears: Some uses of ‘tag questions’ in a child protection helpline. In A.F. Freed & S. Ehrlich (Eds). “Why Do You Ask?”: The Function of Questions in Institutional Discourse (pp. 69–86). Oxford: Oxford University Press.
- Galina B. Bolden, Alexa Hepburn and Jenny Mandelbaum (2023) The distinctive uses of right in British and American English interaction, 16 January 2023, Journal of Pragmatics. DOI: 10.1016/j.pragma.2022.12.017
- Hepburn, A. (2023). Decoding Human Interaction: Transcription Conventions for Conversation Analysis. National Centre for Research Methods online learning resource
