= Teun A. van Dijk =

Dutch critical discourse analyst

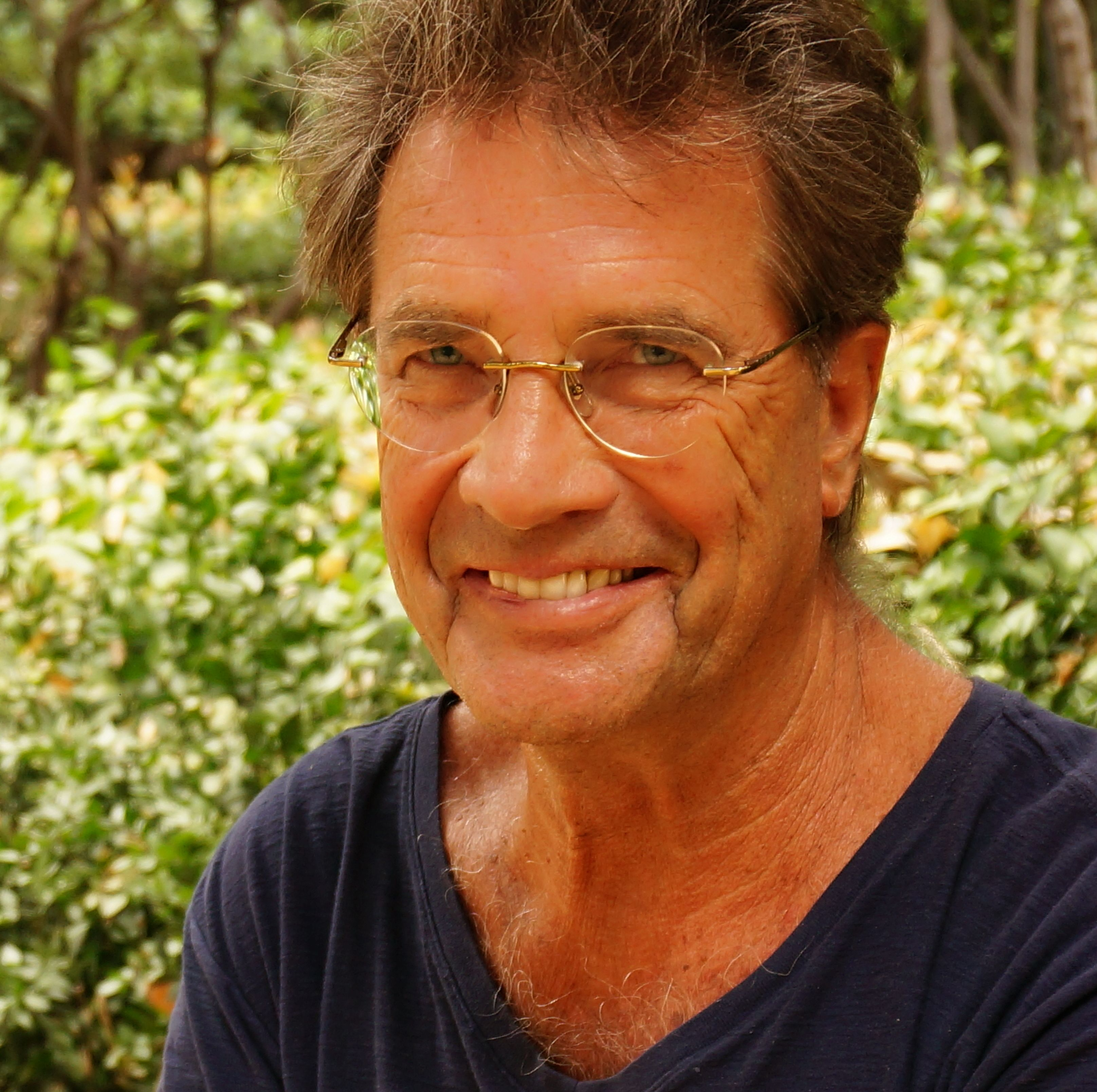
- van Dijk in 2013
- Born: 7 May 1943 (age 83); Naaldwijk, Reichskommissariat Niederlande
- Employer: Pompeu Fabra University
- Known for: Critical discourse analysis
- Website: discourses.org

Teun Adrianus van Dijk (born 7 May 1943 in Naaldwijk, German-occupied Netherlands) is a scholar in the fields of text linguistics, discourse analysis and critical discourse studies (CDS).

He studied French Language and Literature at the Vrije Universiteit Amsterdam and General Literary Studies at the University of Amsterdam, and did post-graduate studies at the University of Strasbourg, École pratique des hautes études, University of California at Berkeley, and University of California at San Diego.

With Walter Kintsch he contributed to the development of the psychology of text processing. Since the 1980s his work in CDS focuses especially on the study of the discursive reproduction of racism by what he calls the "symbolic elites" (politicians, journalists, scholars, writers), on the study of news in the press, and on the theories of ideology, context, and knowledge. His recent work is on social movement discourse and on discourse and ideologies of the radical right. His publications since the 1980s on topics in critical discourse studies are increasingly multidisciplinary and relate discourse and society via a sociocognitive interface.

He founded six international journals: Poetics, Text (now called Text & Talk), Discurso & Sociedad, Discourse & Communication,Discourse & Society, and Discourse Studies, of which he still edits the latter two.

Teun A. van Dijk was a professor of discourse studies at the University of Amsterdam from 1968 until 2004, and since 1999 he has taught at the Pompeu Fabra University in Barcelona. In 2017 he founded the Centre of Discourse Studies in Barcelona.

He has given lectures in more than 60 countries; taught at Bielefeld University, the National Autonomous University of Mexico, El Colegio de México, the University of Puerto Rico at Rio Piedras, the State University of Campinas, and Rio de Janeiro State University; and received honorary doctorates from the University of Buenos Aires, National University of Tucumán, and Universidad de Mendoza.

== Selected bibliography ==
=== Authored books ===
- Some aspects of text grammars: A study in theoretical poetics and linguistics. The Hague: Mouton, 1972.
- Text and context: Explorations in the semantics and pragmatics of discourse. London: Longman, 1977.
- Macrostructures: An interdisciplinary study of global structures in discourse, interaction, and cognition. Hillsdale, NJ: Erlbaum.
- Studies in the pragmatics of discourse. The Hague/Berlin: Mouton, 1981.
- Strategies of discourse comprehension. With Walter Kintsch. New York: Academic Press, 1983.
- Prejudice in discourse. Amsterdam: Benjamins, 1984.
- Communicating Racism: Ethnic Prejudice in Thought and Talk. Newbury Park, CA: Sage, 1987.
- News as discourse. Hillsdale, NJ: Erlbaum, 1988.
- News Analysis: Case studies of international and national news in the press. Hillsdale, NJ: Erlbaum, 1988.
- Racism and the press. London: Routledge, 1991.
- Elite discourse and racism. Newbury Park, CA: Sage, 1993.
- Ideology: A multidisciplinary approach. London: Sage, 1998.
- Racism and discourse in Spain and Latin America. Amsterdam: Benjamins, 2005.
- Discourse and context: A sociocognitive approach. Cambridge University Press, 2008.
- Society and discourse: How social contexts control text and talk. Cambridge University Press, 2009.
- Discourse and power: Contributions to critical discourse studies. Houndsmills: Palgrave MacMillan, 2008.
- Discourse and knowledge: A sociocognitive approach. Cambridge University Press, 2014.
- Antiracist discourse in Brazil: From abolition to affirmative action.. Lanham: Lexington Books, 2020.
- Antiracist discourse: Theory and history of a macromovement. Cambridge University Press, 2021.
- Social movement discourse: An introduction. Abington: Routledge, 2024.
- Discourse and ideologies of the radical right. Cambridge University Press, 2024.

=== Edited books ===
- Pragmatics of language and literature. Amsterdam: North Holland, 1976.
- Handbook of discourse analysis. 4 volumes. London: Academic Press, 1985.
- Discourse and communication. Berlin/New York: De Gruyter, 1985.
- Discourse studies. A multidisciplinary introduction. 2 volumes. London: Sage, 1997.
- Discourse studies. 5 volumes. New Delhi: Sage, 2007.
- Discourse and discrimination. With Geneva Smitherman. Detroit: Wayne State University Press, 1988.
- Racism at the top: Parliamentary discourses on ethnic issues in six European countries. With Ruth Wodak. Klagenfurt: Drava Verlag, 2000.
- Communicating ideologies: Multidisciplinary perspectives on language, discourse and social practice. With Martin Pütz and JoAnne Neff-van Aertselaer. Frankfurt/Main: Peter Lang, 2004.
- Racism and discourse in Latin America. Lanham: Lexington Books, 2009.
- Handbook of discourse studies in Spanish. With Carmen López and Isolda Carranza. London: Routledge, 2022.
