= Elizabeth Stokoe =

British social scientist and conversation analyst

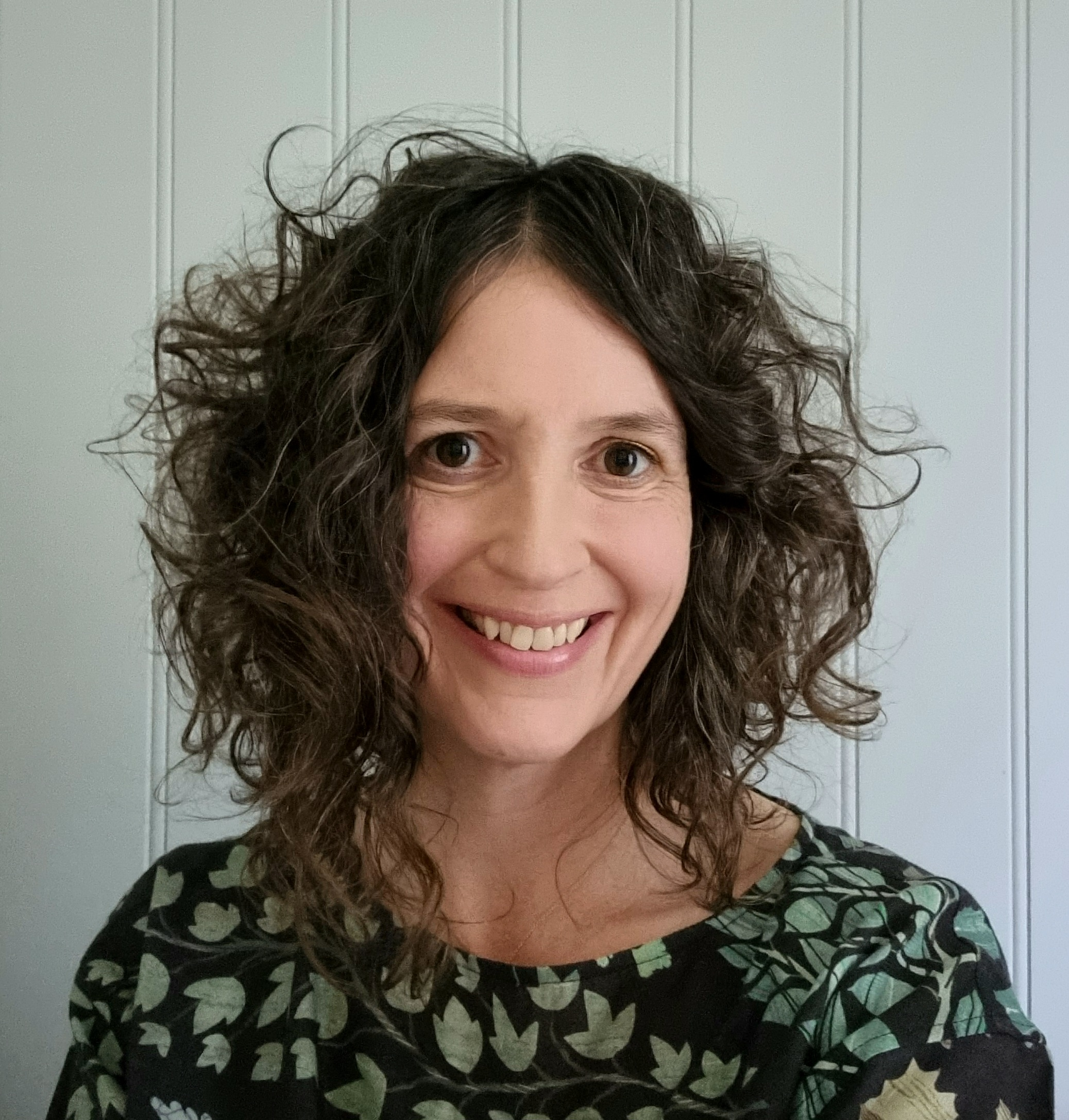
- Education: Leicester University, University of Central Lancashire
- Known for: Research in conversation analysis. Conversation Analytic Role-play Method (CARM)
- Awards: Wired Innovation Fellow (2015) HonFBPsS (2021)
- Scientific career
- Fields: Conversation analysis, Psychology
- Workplaces: The London School of Economics and Political Science, Loughborough University
- Website: https://www.lse.ac.uk/PBS/People/Professor-Elizabeth-Stokoe

Elizabeth Stokoe is a British social scientist and conversation analyst. Since January 2023, she has been Professor in the Department of Psychological and Behavioural Science at The London School of Economics and Political Science. She was previously Professor of Social Interaction at Loughborough University (2002–2022) in the Discourse and Rhetoric Group, where she remains an Honorary Professor. She has been Professor II at University of South-Eastern Norway since 2016.

== Education ==
External videos
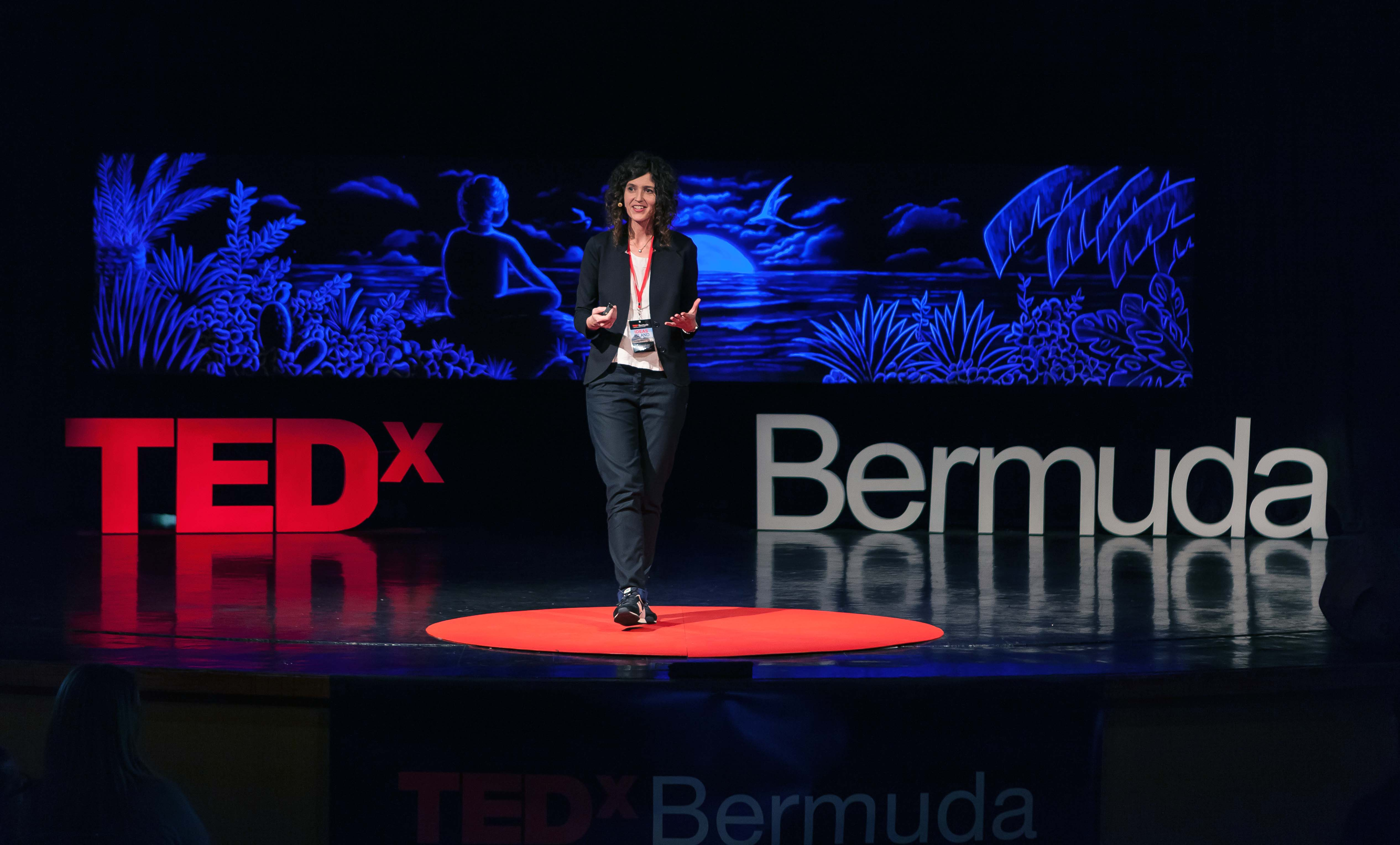
- The science of analyzing conversations, second by second, 19:23, TEDxBermuda
- Inaugural Lecture: Professor Elizabeth Stokoe, 1:03:10, Loughborough University
- CARM – Conversation Analytic Role Play Method Elizabeth Stokoe, 6:53, Loughborough University
- Elizabeth Stokoe at The Royal Institution giving a Friday Evening Discourse
- Elizabeth Stokoe at The Royal Society giving the National Centre for Research Method's Annual Lecture

Stokoe graduated from the University of Central Lancashire ("Preston Poly") in 1993 with an undergraduate degree in psychology. She completed her PhD in psychology at what was then Nene College, though her PhD was accredited by Leicester University. Her supervisors were Dr. Eunice Fisher and (as external), Professor Derek Edwards. Her PhD was entitled, "Gender and Discourse in Higher Education". Stokoe collected video recordings of university tutorials, and conducted conversation analyses of the way students produced on-task talk and managed topics, as well as academic identity and the relevance of gender to interaction.

== Career ==
After starting her lecturing career at University of Derby (1997–2000) and University of Worcester (2000–2002), Stokoe joined the (then) Department of Social Sciences at Loughborough University in October 2002. She became a chair in 2009.

Stokoe's research is in conversation analysis, focused on understanding how social interaction works in settings from first dates to medicine and healthcare; from mediation to police crisis negotiation and emergency service calls, and from sales encounters to interaction in “SaaS” (Software as a Service) platforms and conversational user interfaces. Much of her early research focused on how people categorize themselves and each other – and resist, challenge, embrace those categorizations – in talk and text of all kinds. It examined ‘isms’ and the incredibly subtle as well as blatant ways in which power, prejudice, and inclusion/exclusion are made manifest in the details of social interaction. Another common thread in her work is the identification of effective and less effective interactional practices and their impact on the outcome of conversational encounters. She has published over 150 research outputs, including several co-authored academic books (Discourse and Identity, 2006, Conversation and Gender, 2011, Disursive Psychology: Classic and Contemporary Issues, 2016; Crisis Talk: Negotiating with Indivudials in Crisis, 2022). She is currently a co-investigator on the Economic and Social Research Council-funded Centre for Early Mathematics Learning (2022–2027) led by Professor Camilla Gilmore.

During her 20 years at Loughborough University, she was Associate Dean Research (2013–2018) for the School of Social Sciences and Humanities, and Associate Pro Vice-Chancellor (2019–2021) for REF2021.She co-edited Gender and Language from 2011 to 2014 and was an Associate Editor of British Journal of Social Psychology from 2009 to 2014. She launched the journal Mediation Theory and Practice in 2016.

Between 2008 and 2011, Stokoe developed the Conversation Analytic Role-play Method (CARM), an approach to communications skills training based on conversation analytic research evidence about what sorts of problems and roadblocks can occur in conversation, as well as the communicative practices that resolve them. Stokoe developed CARM as a challenge or corrective to other kinds of communication training including role-play and simulation. CARM won a Wired Innovation Fellowship 2015.

Stokoe is passionate about translating research in conversation analysis for wider audiences and she has spoken at many science festivals and events including at Microsoft, Google, TED, Latitude Festival, and The Royal Institution, and featured on BBC Radio 4's “The Life Scientific” and “Word of Mouth." Her book, Talk: The Science of Conversation, was published in 2018 (Little, Brown). Since 2008, she has worked extensively with external partners across public, third, and private sectors, and been an industry fellow at Typeform and Deployed. During the COVID-19 pandemic, she participated in the Policing and Security subgroup of the Independent Scientific Pandemic Insights Group on Behaviours (SPI-B), which provided independent, expert behavioural science advice to the Scientific Advisory Group for Emergencies (SAGE). She is also a member of Independent SAGE's behaviour group. She became an Honorary Fellow of the British Psychological Society, awarded for distinguished service in the field of psychology, in 2021.

== Selected bibliography ==
Stokoe's academic publications are listed at Google Scholar:

=== Books ===
- Sikveland, Rein Ove; Kevoe-Feldman, Heidi; Stokoe, Elizabeth (2022). Crisis Talk: Negotiating with Individuals in Crisis. Routledge.
- Stokoe, Elizabeth (2018). Talk: The Science of Conversation. London: Robinson. ISBN 978-1472140845.
- Tileagă, Cristian; Stokoe, Elizabeth (2016). Discursive psychology: Classic and contemporary issues. Oxford: Routledge. ISBN 9780415721608.
- Speer, Susan A.; Stokoe, Elizabeth (2011). Conversation and gender. Cambridge: Cambridge University Press. ISBN 9780521696036.
- Stokoe, Elizabeth; Benwell, Bethan (2006). Discourse and identity. Edinburgh: Edinburgh University Press. ISBN 9780748617500.
