= Karen Henwood =

British social psychologist

Academic background
- Education: University of Bristol

Academic work
- Main interests: Social psychology
- Website: Cardiff University

Karen Henwood is a British social psychologist and Professor of Social Sciences at Cardiff University, and an expert on identity and risk, particularly socio-cultural and environmental change. Her research in recent years includes the ESRC project "Timescapes" on relationships and identities through the life course, and a project on men as fathers, as well as research on energy use, sustainable development, climate change policy and on living with nuclear risk. She was editor-in-chief of Qualitative Research from 2016 to 2019.

== Biography ==
She holds a BSc in psychology and a PhD in social psychology from the University of Bristol, and worked in clinical psychology and health psychology at the School of Psychology, Bangor University (1995–1999) and the School of Medicine, Health Policy and Practice at the University of East Anglia (1999–2006), before her 2006 appointment as senior lecturer and later professor at the Cardiff School of Social Sciences. She is affiliated with the Collaborative Centre of Excellence in Understanding and Managing Natural and Environmental Risks, and with the Sustainable Places Research Institute.

Henwood has authored several highly cited publications within social psychology. Her most cited work, "Qualitative research and psychological theorizing," was cited over 1100 times as of 2019. According to Google Scholar Henwood has been cited around 12,000 times in scientific literature and has an h-index of 45.

== Selected bibliography ==
- Henwood, Karen; Phoenix, Ann; Griffin, Christine (1998). Standpoints and differences: essays in the practice of feminist psychology. London Thousand Oaks, California: SAGE. ISBN 9780761954446.
