= Ann Phoenix =

British psychologist (born 1955)

- Born: 27 March 1955 (age 71)
- Citizenship: British
- Education: University of London
- Scientific career
- Fields: Social psychology, Developmental psychology
- Workplaces: UCL Institute of Education
- Thesis: Motherhood in 16-19 year old women (1992)

Ann Phoenix, FBA, FAcSS (born 27 March 1955) is a British psychologist and academic, whose research focuses on psychosocial issues related to identity. She is Professor of Psychosocial Studies at the Institute of Education, University College London. She was previously ESRC Professorial Fellow for the Transforming Experiences research programme. She was previously co-director of the Thomas Coram Research Unit, and Reader in Psychology at the Open University.

== Academic career ==
Phoenix's early academic career was spent at the Open University. She was a senior lecturer and then Reader in psychology. She was a visiting professor at the University of Humanistic Studies in Utrecht, The Netherlands, for the 1997–1998 academic year. In 2003, she was promoted to Professor of Social Science and Developmental Psychology. In 2007, she joined the Institute of Education, then part of the University of London, as Professor of Education, and co-director, Thomas Coram Research Unit. In 2014, the Institute of Education became part of University College London (UCL).

== Honours ==
In 2014, Phoenix was elected a Fellow of the British Academy, the United Kingdom's national academy for the humanities and social sciences. She is also a Fellow of the Academy of Social Sciences (FAcSS).

== Publications ==
=== Books ===
- Phoenix, Ann (1991). Young mothers. Cambridge, UK: Polity Press. ISBN 9780745608549.
- Phoenix, Ann; Hinds, Hilary; Stacey, Jackie (1992). Working out: New directions for women's studies. Gender and Society: Feminist Perspectives on Past and Present. London Washington, D.C: The Falmer Press. ISBN 9780750700436.
- Phoenix, Ann; Lutz, Helma; Yuval-Davis, Nira (1995). Crossfires: Nationalism, racism, and gender in Europe. London East Haven, Connecticut: Pluto Press for the European Forum of Left Feminists. ISBN 9780745309941.
- Phoenix, Ann; Henwood, Karen; Griffin, Christine (1998). Standpoints and differences: Essays in the practice of feminist psychology. London Thousand Oaks, California: SAGE. ISBN 9780761954446.
- Phoenix, Ann; Frosh, Stephen; Pattmann, Rob (2002). Young masculinities understanding boys in contemporary society. Basingstoke: Palgrave Macmillan. ISBN 9780333779231.
- Phoenix, Ann; Tizard, Barbara (2002). Black, white or mixed race? Race and racism in the lives of young people of mixed parentage. London New York: Routledge. ISBN 9780415259828.
- Phoenix, Ann; Husain, Fatima (2007). Parenting and ethnicity. York: Joseph Rowntree Foundation in association with the Open University. ISBN 9781859355978. Pdf.
- Phoenix, Ann; Miell, Dorothy; Thomas, Kerry (2007). Mapping psychology. DSE212 Course: Exploring Psychology. Milton Keynes: Open University. ISBN 9781780074986.

=== Journal articles ===
- Phoenix, Ann (August 2000). "Aspiring to a politics of alliance: response to Sylvia Walby's 'Beyond the politics of location: the power of argument in a global era'". Feminist Theory. 1 (2): 230–235. doi:10.1177/14647000022229182. S2CID 143740067.

=== Conference papers ===
- Phoenix, Ann; Nairn, Agnes; Griffin, Christine; Wickes, Patricia G.; Croghan, Rosaleen; Hunter, Janine (2006), "Girly girls, tomboys and micro-waving Barbie: child and youth consumption and the disavowal of femininity", in Stevens, Lorna; Borgerson, Janet (eds.), GCB - Gender and Consumer Behavior Volume 8, vol. GCB-08, Edinburgh, Scotland: Association for Consumer Research (ACR), pp. 6–21. Pdf.
