= Theory & Psychology =

- Discipline: Psychology
- Language: English
- Edited by: Kieran C. O'Doherty

Publication details
- History: 1991–present
- Publisher: SAGE Publications
- Frequency: Bi-monthly
- Impact factor: 1.062 (2010)

Standard abbreviations
- ISO 4: Theory Psychol.

Indexing
- CODEN: THPSEJ
- ISSN: 0959-3543 (print); 1461-7447 (web)
- LCCN: 91640670
- OCLC no.: 663104224

Links
- Journal homepage; Online access; Online archive

Theory & Psychology is a peer-reviewed academic journal that publishes papers in the field of Psychology. The journal's founding editor is Henderikus J Stam. The journal's current editor is Kieran C O'Doherty. It has been in publication since 1991 and is currently published by SAGE Publications.

== Scope ==
Theory & Psychology is a forum for theoretical and meta-theoretical analysis in Psychology. The journal publishes papers which focus on the emergent themes of contemporary psychological debate. Theory & Psychology is published six times a year and is aimed at a broad psychological audience, particularly those concerned with the evolution of Modern Psychology.

== Abstracting and indexing ==
Theory & Psychology is abstracted and indexed in, among other databases: SCOPUS, and the Social Sciences Citation Index. According to the Journal Citation Reports, its 2021 impact factor is 1.553, ranking it 105 out of 147 journals in the category 'Psychology, multidisciplinary'.
