= Feminism & Psychology =

- Discipline: Psychology
- Language: English
- Edited by: Tracy Morison

Publication details
- History: 1991–present
- Publisher: SAGE Publishing
- Frequency: Quarterly
- Open access: Hybrid
- Impact factor: 2.2 (2023)

Standard abbreviations
- ISO 4: Fem. Psychol.

Indexing
- ISSN: 0959-3535 (print); 1461-7161 (web)
- LCCN: 91649264
- OCLC no.: 23367452

Links
- Journal homepage; Online access; Online archive

Feminism & Psychology is a quarterly peer-reviewed academic journal that covers feminist theory and practice in psychology. It was established in 1991 by Sue Wilkinson (University of York) and is published by SAGE Publishing. The editor-in-chief is Tracy Morison (Massey University).

== Abstracting and indexing ==
The journal is abstracted and indexed in Scopus and the Social Sciences Citation Index. According to the Journal Citation Reports, the journal has a 2023 impact factor of 2.2.

== Editors ==
Since its establishment in 1991 the editorial leadership has taken different configurations. After the founding editor-in-chief Sue Wilkinson stepped down in 2007, Nicola Gavey and Virginia Braun took the helm as joint editors-in-chief (2008–2012). They were succeeded by Catriona Macleod (Rhodes University; 2013–2021) and then Tracy Morison from 2025.

== See also ==
- List of women's studies journals
