= Discourse Studies =

- Discipline: Communication
- Language: English
- Edited by: Teun A van Dijk

Publication details
- History: 1999-present
- Publisher: SAGE Publications
- Frequency: Bimonthly
- Impact factor: 1.603 (2014)

Standard abbreviations
- ISO 4: Discourse Stud.

Indexing
- ISSN: 1461-4456 (print); 1461-7080 (web)
- LCCN: 99023261
- OCLC no.: 475056445

Links
- Journal homepage; Online access; Online archive

Discourse Studies is a bimonthly peer-reviewed academic journal that covers the field of discourse analysis, especially articles that offer a detailed, systematic and explicit analysis of the structures and strategies of text and talk, their cognitive basis and their social, political and cultural functions. It specifically also publishes studies in conversation analysis. The journal was established in 1999 by Teun A. van Dijk.

== Scope ==
Discourse Studies is a general journal for the study of text and talk. It features work on the structures and strategies of written and spoken discourse, with a particular focus on cross-disciplinary studies of text and talk in linguistics, communication studies, ethnomethodology, anthropology, cognitive and social psychology, and law. Articles on the socio-political aspects of discourse are published in its sister journal, Discourse & Society. Articles that study the relations between discourse and communication are specifically published in Discourse & Communication.

== Abstracting and indexing ==
Discourse Studies is abstracted and indexed in Scopus and the Social Sciences Citation Index. According to the Journal Citation Reports, its 2012 impact factor is 0.938, ranking it 31st out of 72 journals in the category "Communication".
