= Journal of Sociolinguistics =

- Discipline: Sociolinguistics
- Language: English
- Edited by: Lauren Hall-Lew, Jaspal Naveel Singh, and Andrew Wong

Publication details
- History: 1997–present
- Publisher: Wiley-Blackwell (United Kingdom)
- Frequency: 5/year
- Impact factor: 4.0 (2025)

Standard abbreviations
- ISO 4: J. Socioling.

Indexing
- ISSN: 1360-6441 (print); 1467-9841 (web)
- LCCN: 97657172
- OCLC no.: 49863808

Links
- Journal homepage

The Journal of Sociolinguistics is a peer-reviewed academic journal that covers topics in sociolinguistics. Its scope encompasses a wide range of languages treated from a multidisciplinary point of view. It was established in 1997 and appears five times a year. It is published by Wiley-Blackwell and the current editors in chief are Lauren Hall-Lew (the University of Edinburgh), Jaspal Naveel Singh (the Open University), and Andrew Wong (California State University, East Bay).

== Abstracting and indexing ==
The journal is indexed in the following services:

- Academic Search and Academic Search Premier
- Communication & Mass Media Index
- CSA Biological Sciences Database
- CSA Environmental Sciences & Pollution Management Database
- Current Contents/Social & Behavioral Sciences
- Ecology Abstracts
- Educational Research Abstracts Online
- FRANCIS
- IBR & IBZ: International Bibliographies of Periodical Literature
- Journal Citation Reports, Social Science Edition
- Linguistics & Language Behavior Abstracts
- PsycINFO
- Social Sciences Citation Index
- Social Services Abstracts
- SocINDEX
- Sociological Abstracts

According to the Journal Citation Reports, the journal has a 2024 impact factor of 2.6.
