= Discourse & Society =

- Discipline: Discourse analysis
- Language: English
- Edited by: Teun A. van Dijk

Publication details
- History: 1990-present
- Publisher: SAGE Publications
- Frequency: Bimonthly
- Impact factor: 1.390 (2019)

Standard abbreviations
- ISO 4: Discourse Soc.

Indexing
- CODEN: DISOEN
- ISSN: 0957-9265 (print); 1460-3624 (web)
- LCCN: 91650382
- OCLC no.: 38526133

Links
- Journal homepage; Online access; Online archive

Discourse & Society is a bimonthly peer-reviewed academic journal that covers the field of discourse analysis. It was established in 1990 by Teun A. van Dijk (Pompeu Fabra University), who has been the editor-in-chief ever since.

== Abstracting and indexing ==
The journal is abstracted and indexed in Scopus and the Social Sciences Citation Index. According to the Journal Citation Reports, its 2019 one-year impact factor is 1.39, and its five-year impact factor is 1.987, ranking it 71st out of 150 in the category "Sociology", 69th out of 138 in the category "Psychology, Multidisciplinary", and 55th out of 92 in the category "Communication".
