= Anne Warfield Rawls =

American sociologist

- Born: November 20, 1950 (age 75); Princeton, NJ
- Occupation: Professor of Sociology
- Parent: John Rawls

Anne Warfield Rawls (born November 20, 1950) is an American sociologist, social theorist and ethnomethodologist. She is professor of sociology at Bentley University, Professor for Interaction, Work and Information at the University of Siegen, Germany and director of the Harold Garfinkel Archive, Newburyport, MA. Rawls has been teaching courses on social theory, social interaction, ethnomethodology and systemic racism for over forty years. She has also written extensively on Émile Durkheim and Harold Garfinkel, explaining their argument that equality is needed to ground practices in democratic publics, and showing how inequality interferes with the cooperation and reflexivity necessary to successfully engage in complex practices.

== Education and career ==
Rawls received her BA (1976), MA (1979), and PhD (1983) degrees from Boston University, where she studied sociology, philosophy, and classics. While still an undergraduate, she began developing original ideas about grounding a theory of ethics in interactionist sociology. She was particularly inspired by Immanuel Kant, whose notion of a Kingdom of Ends that is grounded in Social Contract had influenced the development of sociology, and by Erving Goffman, and Harold Garfinkel, whose 1975 seminar at Boston University she participated in, and with whom she would later collaborate extensively (see below). Goffman and Garfinkel both built on the notion that self and meaning depend on a collective commitment to the ground-rules of interaction, an idea related to Kant, which influenced her own argument that equality and reciprocity are necessary preconditions for making sense and self in society.

Anne Rawls' study of interaction orders of Race (see below) began in 1971 when she went to night school at Harvard University through an extension program founded by the Lowell family that was open to members of the greater Cambridge community and often taught by Harvard faculty. Taking advantage of this opportunity, Rawls was able to take courses with Ephraim Isaac (now at Princeton), who taught African religions and philosophy, and with Martin Kilson, Harvard's first African American professor of government, who taught the history of Black politics in the US. Anne Rawls was also able to spend time with Hollis Lynch, then director of the Institute of African Studies at Columbia University, and with some of his students.

In 1973, at Wheelock College in Boston, Frances Chaput Waksler (a Boston University PhD, and student of George Psathas) introduced Rawls to sociology and the work of Erving Goffman and Harold Garfinkel, which led her to see how questions of race and justice could be approached through an interactionist sociology. This led her to Boston University in the fall of 1974 to study with George Psathas, Jeff Coulter, and then in 1975 with Harold Garfinkel (and Emanuel Schegloff). Harvey Sacks and Anita Pomerantz also taught at Boston University during this period.

Pursuing degrees in both philosophy and sociology, Rawls took courses in the Philosophy Department at BU with Alasdair MacIntyre, Thomas A. McCarthy, Bernard Elevitch, Erazim Kohák, and John Findlay. Through a cooperative program she was also able to study with Kurt Wolff, Gila Hayim, at Brandeis University and Dieter Henrich at Harvard. She also studied classical and medieval Latin with Emily Albu (pursuing research on women in the classical and medieval period). Yearly conferences in ethnomethodology brought students and colleagues from around the world to Boston University (including Harold Garfinkel, Harvey Sacks, Gail Jefferson, Emanuel Schegloff, Christian Heath, Michael Lynch, Anita Pomerantz, David Sudnow, Charles and Marjorie Harness Goodwin, Wes Sharrock, John Heritage, Rod Watson, Douglas Maynard, Paul Drew, Alene Terasaki, John O’Neill, Jim Heap, and Lindsey Churchill). It was these meetings, and Garfinkel's presence at them in 1975, that eventually led to Rawls' collaborative relationship with Harold Garfinkel.

Rawls received an MA in philosophy in 1976 and a PhD in sociology in 1983. Her thesis, titled “Constitutive justice: An interactionist contribution to the understanding of social order and human value,” argues that social order is inseparable from social justice, and that a viable theory of ethics must be grounded in the constitutive requirements of interaction, which is where all social facts, including the self, are ultimately produced. Taking a social contract approach to social order, she argues that self is produced in society, and so cannot serve as its foundation. Instead, interaction and its ground-rules must be the primary unit of analysis.

After receiving her PhD, Rawls did a two-year NIMH postdoctoral fellowship (1986–87) at the University of Wisconsin-Madison’s Department of Psychiatry. Following a year at Michigan State University in 1988, she became assistant professor of sociology at Wayne State University in 1989, and was promoted to associate professor the following year. She remained at Wayne until 2001, when she took a professorship at Bentley University. In 2008, she became director of the Garfinkel Archive, and since 2016 holds an additional research professorship of socio-informatics at the University of Siegen, Germany. She has also been associate researcher at the École des hautes études en sciences sociale in Paris (since 2010), and senior research fellow at Yale University’s Center for Urban Ethnography (since 2015).

== Research areas ==
- Social Interaction and Interaction Orders
- Ethnomethodology and Conversation Analysis
- Sociological Theory (Durkheim / Parsons / Goffman / Garfinkel)
- Epistemology and its Intersection with Sociological Theory and Practice Theory
- Inequalities of Race/Culture in Social Interaction
- Social Justice/Inequality and the need for Moral Reciprocity in Interaction
- Policing and Prison Inmate Societies: Power and Inequality in Social Interaction
- History of Social Research: How Qualitative approaches to Praxeology got sidelined
- Information Technology and Information Systems
- The Social Self and the Presentation of Marginalized Identity

== Rawls' major work ==
=== Interaction Order ===
One of Rawls’ most significant contributions to sociology is her theory of interaction order. In an influential 1987 article published in Sociological Theory, Rawls builds on Goffman's argument that "Interaction order" is the sui generis site where meaning, self, and other social objects are achieved. Interaction orders consist of tacit, taken for granted rules, practices, and expectations that members of society use to coordinate their actions and make sense together. These rules and practices are not universal, but specific to particular settings and circumstances. Rawls' work on interaction order also builds on Emile Durkheim's (1893/1933) argument that society consists of social facts that must be continually made through constitutive practices in interaction (see below), Immanuel Kant's (1783) Kingdom of Ends, and Harold Garfinkel's (1967) specification of constitutive practices and their conditions of possibility in social interaction, which Garfinkel (1963) calls Trust Conditions. Interaction order is central to Rawls' arguments about race and equality (see below: Interaction Orders of Race).

=== Durkheim's Epistemology and Social Justice ===
Rawls has distinguished herself as one of the foremost contemporary interpreters of Émile Durkheim. In her article “Durkheim’s Epistemology: The Neglected Argument” and subsequent book, “Epistemology and Practice” Rawls challenges influential conceptions of Durkheim’s work, including the claims that his thought can be separated into an early “materialist” phase and a later “idealist” phase, that these phases were never fully reconciled, and that Durkheim lacks a coherent epistemology. Based on a close reading of Durkheim's (1912) The Elementary Forms of Religious Life, Rawls argues that Durkheim does in fact have such an epistemology and that because he grounds it in an empirical analysis of the constitutive practices and expectations that make up society, he is able to solve the problems posed by Hume and Kant without falling into the traps of relativism or idealism. Durkheim's approach, argues Rawls, supplants Kant's philosophical epistemology with a sociological one rooted in the concrete empirical details of social life. Durkheim does this by showing how, what Kant called "the categories of the understanding" emerge through social processes, so that the primary unit of analysis is no longer the mind of the individual, but social interactions that produce social facts – including the individual as such. This move allowed Durkheim to resolve Hume's famous formulation of the problem of induction: people have a direct experience of creating social facts in interaction, of causing such facts to come into being, an experience that remains primary even as they later represent and transform it through accounts and beliefs about causal forces. Therefore, knowledge of social facts does not come through induction (or deduction).

In more recent work, Rawls develops her position that social justice is central to Durkheim's work. Focusing on Durkheim's Division of Labor in Society, she expounds and elaborates his argument that modern societies require equality in order to function. In contrast with traditional societies, which are held together by broadly shared meanings and traditions, diverse modern societies cannot take the existence of shared symbolic meaning for granted. Instead, meaning must be assembled "on the spot" in interaction via practices that belong to situations (like queues, classrooms, or scientific practices) that are shared by two or more participants. According to Rawls' argument, this requires that participants commit to the ground rules of an interaction order, and that Trust Conditions be met. It also requires that constitutive practices be equally accessible to all members of society, which in turn requires equality. Where practices are not equally accessible, people cannot cooperate to create social facts – including self – making interaction impossible and threatening the very foundations of society, which regularly has to be 'remade' by its members or it will cease to exist.

=== Collaboration with Harold Garfinkel, the Garfinkel Archive and "Media of Cooperation" ===
Rawls first met Garfinkel in 1975 at Boston University, where she participated in the summer seminar he was teaching. This marked the beginning of a relationship that would continue for the rest of Garfinkel's life, and which eventually led to a collaboration that produced several publications – Ethnomethodology’s Program (2002), Seeing Sociologically (2006), and Toward a Sociological Theory of Information (2008) – all of which are edited and introduced by Rawls.

Ethnomethodology’s Program (2002), Garfinkel's first book since his landmark Studies in Ethnomethodology (1967), captures the major developments in his thinking and research over the previous three and a half decades. Seeing Sociologically (2006) and Toward a Sociological Theory of Information (2008), on the other hand, reach back to the beginning of Garfinkel's career: “Seeing Sociologically” was originally a dissertation proposal Garfinkel wrote in 1947, while “Toward a Sociological Theory of Information” was a lengthy research memo written while Garfinkel had a research/teaching appointment (with the Organizational Behavior Project) at Princeton (1951–53). Both of these works are important not only for the light they shed on Garfinkel's early career, but for the theoretical framework they provide for understanding the work he would do later on, and for which he became famous, i.e. in particular Studies in Ethnomethodology (1967).

==== Harold Garfinkel Archive ====
In 2008, Rawls became director of the Garfinkel Archive. In this role, she manages all of the materials Garfinkel accumulated over his 72-year career (1939–2011), including manuscripts, correspondence, course materials, and audio and video recordings of meetings, seminars, and lectures. The Archive is located in Newburyport, Massachusetts.

Recent publications from the Garfinkel Archive include Parsons’ Primer (2019) (for which Rawls co-authored an introduction with Jason Turowetz), and The History of Gulfport Field 1942 (2019) (co-edited with Michael Lynch). Written in 1962 but published for the first time in 2019, Parsons' Primer documents the little known collaboration between Garfinkel and Parsons and the mutual influences these scholars, who are traditionally placed on opposite ends of the sociological spectrum, had on one another's work. In particular, it shows how Garfinkel and Parsons each put interaction at the center of their theories, and how this move embedded a radical critique of mainstream social theory, which tends to remain centered on individuals rather than on interactions (treating interaction in terms of connections between pre-existing individuals, rather than as the social rules and expectations that are used to make self and meaning in the first place). “A History of Gulfport Field 1942,” Garfinkel's report to the U.S. military on the training of airplane mechanics during WW-II, can in important respects be considered the first "hybrid study" of work, an approach to the sociology of work that Garfinkel (1986) pioneered and would popularize in subsequent decades.

==== Collaborative Research Center "Media of Cooperation" ====
Since 2016, Rawls has been collaborating on projects involving the archive with faculty at the University of Siegen, where she is one of the principal investigators on a German Research Foundation (DFG)-funded grant "Media of Cooperation" (SFB-1187). The Collaborative Research Center is an interdisciplinary research association consisting of 14 projects and more than 60 researchers from the fields of media studies, anthropology, sociology, philosophy, German language and literature studies, computer sciences, and medicine, as well as history, education, jurisprudence, and engineering. At the center of the research is the exploration of digitally networked media and data practices. Media of cooperation focuses on the formation, history, and dissemination of digital media, that are understood as cooperatively produced conditions of cooperation.

Research interest and media-science challenge:

- Scientific investigation of cooperative practices that arise in media and from which, vice versa, media arise.
- The digitalization of the media transforms media practices and leads to new questions for media history and media theory

The research center aims at the development of a digital praxeology, that is informed by Ethnomethodology and Garfinkel's research available in the Archive. Project area P ("Praxeology of media") is therefore reevaluating an ethnomethodological understanding of praxeology, contributing to the historicization of Science and Technology Studies as well as to the reflection of methods in Media Studies and Social Sciences. Currently three sub-projects in collaboration with Erhard Schüttpelz, Tristan Thielmann, Carolin Gerlitz, Anne Rawls, Michael Lynch, Christian Meyer, Clemens Knobloch, Patrick Sahle, Jason Chao, Andreas Mertgens, Jörn Preuß, Christian Erbacher, Andrea Ploder, James McElvenny, Philippe Sormani, Clemens Eisenmann, and Jason Turowetz are engaged with a "praxeology of media", investigating the "'Discovery Procedures' of Science and Technology Studies", the "History of audio-visual sequence analysis as a methodology", and "Digital Tools and Environments for Research".

=== Interaction Orders of Race ===
Anne Rawls' study of interaction orders of Race began in 1971 (see Education and Career above).

==== “Race” as an Interaction Order Phenomenon: W.E.B. Du Bois’s “Double Consciousness” Thesis Revisited* ====
In 2000, Rawls published “Race” as an Interaction Order Phenomenon: W.E.B. Du Bois’s “Double Consciousness” Thesis Revisited* She argued that a theoretical explanation needs to be offered for why and how two groups of people, both speaking the same language and apparently occupying the same geographical space, could come to differ so significantly in their communicative expectations that they are not able to achieve mutual understanding. In offering this explanation, she argued that while “race” is a socially constructed phenomenon, it is very real in its consequences and that important phenomena of inequality result from the Interaction Order effects of “race” as a social construction. Consistent with her argument that Race is a socially constructed phenomenon Rawls capitalized Race terms in all of her publications to highlight their socially constructed character, a practice that will be followed here. The argument builds directly on the earlier papers on Interaction Order.

==== Tacit Racism ====
In July 2020, Anne W. Rawls and Waverly Duck published Tacit Racism with University of Chicago Press. Tacit Racism is about how Race in the United States has become deeply embedded in the taken-for-granted structures of day-to-day interaction, producing tacit forms of racism that go on every day – yet (mostly) remain hidden. Rawls and Duck identify features of interaction that developed separately because of racism and segregation that prevent equal access to interaction order in contemporary US society. They argue that through a number of factors, centering primarily on what W.E.B. Du Bois identified as "Double Consciousness", Black American Interaction Order expectations are more democratic and egalitarian that White American expectations. Contrary to the general argument that assimilation would improve the current situation of racial inequality, Rawls and Duck argue that White Americans could learn some important lessons from Black Americans about the importance of equality. The book is also about the high cost of racism and inequality to society more generally. Rawls and Duck introduce and identify a set of interrelated phenomena they call “Interaction Orders of Race”, “Fractured Reflections” and “Submissive Civility” that provide novel ways of understanding Race in everyday interactions.

==== Black Lives Matter: Ethnomethodological and Conversation Analytic Studies of Race and Systemic Racism in Everyday Interaction ====
In the summer of 2020, Anne W. Rawls, Kevin Whitehead, and Waverly Duck wrote an introduction, curated and edited a free book: Black Lives Matter: Ethnomethodological and Conversation Analytic Studies of Race and Systemic Racism in Everyday Interaction with Routledge/Taylor and Francis (published October 2020). This book offers an introduction and collection of articles on topics related to Race, exclusion and category stigma. It opens with an overview of the significance of Race and racism in the development of ethnomethodology. In doing so, it considers a much-overlooked synergy between Harold Garfinkel and W.E.B. Du Bois – first mentioned twenty-years ago (Rawls 2000) – that treats Garfinkel's focus on “troubles” as clues to taken-for-granted processes of exclusion, and what they reveal about “normality” as a way of producing something very much like what Du Bois called “double consciousness”. those who frequently experience trouble, Garfinkel argues, have a heightened awareness of social interaction that can be useful to social researchers. The importance of attending to formerly excluded minority voices, including those of Du Bois, Garfinkel and Durkheim is highlighted. The introduction summarizes Garfinkel's research on Race and racism, and his argument about how categories are both created and used to structure inequality and exclusion; and then discusses Harvey Sacks’ research on how categorization works in actual interactions, and its relationship to Race and inequality.

== Selected publications ==
=== Monographs ===
- Rawls W. Anne; Duck, Waverly. 2020. Tacit Racism. Chicago: University of Chicago Press.
- Rawls W. Anne; Durkheim, Émile. 2019. La Division du Travail Revisited: Vers une Théorie Sociologique de la Justice. Translated by Francesco Callegaro and Philip Chanial. Paris: Le Bord de l’ Eau.
- Rawls W. Anne. 2004. Epistemology and Practice: Durkheim’s The Elementary Forms of Religious Life. Cambridge University Press: Cambridge. (Reprinted 2009)

=== Edited volumes and articles ===
- 2020, Editor (with Kevin Whitehead and Waverly Duck) Black Lives Matter: Ethnomethodological and Conversation Analytic Studies of Race and Systemic Racism in Everyday Interaction with Routledge/Taylor and Francis.
- 2019. Editor (with Mike Lynch), The History of Gulfport Field 1942, Volume II, Part II, a report written by Garfinkel for the Army Airforce in 1943. University of Siegen.
- 2019. Editor (with Jason Turowetz), Parsons’ Primer, by Harold Garfinkel, a manuscript written in 1962. Stuttgart: Springer.
- 2019. Editor of “Notes on language games as a source of methods for studying the formal properties of linguistic events”, by Garfinkel, an article written in 1960 and previously unpublished. The European Journal of Social Theory. May.
- 2012. Editor of “The Red”, by Garfinkel, an article written in 1947 and previously unpublished. Etnografia e ricerca qualitativa 2012(1).
- 2008. Editor, Toward a Sociological Theory of Information, by Harold Garfinkel, a manuscript written in 1952. Paradigm Publishers: Boulder Colorado.
- 2006. Editor, Seeing Sociologically, by Harold Garfinkel, a manuscript written in 1948. Paradigm Publishers: Boulder Colorado.
- 2002. Editor, Ethnomethodology’s Program: Working out Durkheim’s Aphorism, by Harold Garfinkel. Rowman and Littlefield Press: Boulder Colorado.
- 1989. Co-Editor, with D. Helm, T. Anderson and A. Meehan, Interactional Order: New Directions in the Study of Social Order. New York: Irvington Press.

=== Selected journal articles ===
- 2008 “Harold Garfinkel, Ethnomethodology and Workplace Studies.” Organization Studies . Special Symposium Issue. (29) 5: 701–732.
- 2000 “Race as an Interaction Order Phenomenon: W.E.B. Du Bois’s ‘Double Consciousness’ Thesis Revisited.” Sociological Theory . 18(2): 239-272.
- 1996 “Durkheim's Epistemology: The Neglected Argument.” American Journal of Sociology . Volume 102(2): 430–482.
- 1989 “Language, Self, and Social Order: a Re-evaluation of Goffman and Sacks.” Human Studies. Volume 12(1): 147–172.
- 1987 “The Interaction Order Sui Generis: Goffman's Contribution to Social Theory.” Sociological Theory. Volume 5(2): 136–149.
