= Turn-taking =

Type of organization in conversation and discourse

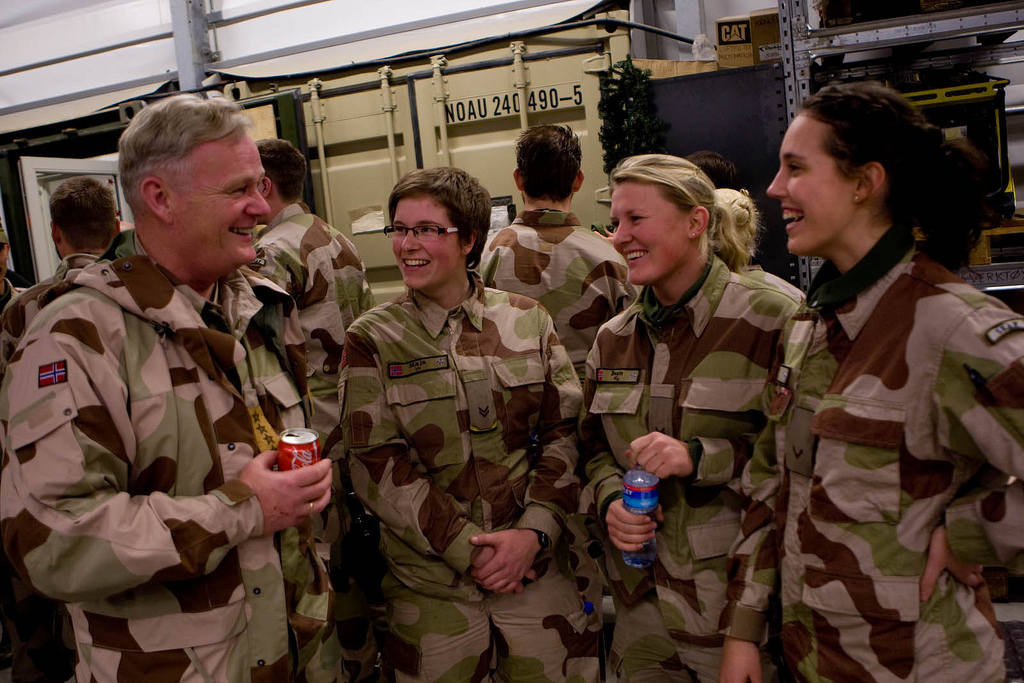
Individuals involved in a conversation take turns speaking

Turn-taking is a type of organization in conversation and discourse where participants speak one at a time in alternating turns. In practice, it involves processes for constructing contributions, responding to previous comments, and transitioning to a different speaker, using a variety of linguistic and non-linguistic cues.

While the structure is generally universal, that is, overlapping talk is generally avoided and silence between turns is minimized, turn-taking conventions vary by culture and community. Conventions vary in many ways, such as how turns are distributed, how transitions are signaled, or how long the average gap is between turns.

Sensitivity to turn-taking exists in other species and develops early in humans, emerging within the first year of life. Two-month-olds can recognize whether a human partner or an object responds to infants’ own actions in a contingent manner. From seven months of age, infants can understand that such turn-taking reactivity is shown by psychological agents. From 10 months of age, infants recognize that turn-taking is fundamental in communicative exchanges. They can identify the transfer of communicative information (or the lack of it) based on three dimensions of turn-taking contingent responding: the “when” (is it a turn-taking response?), “what” (is it a meaningful response?), and “how” (is it a congruent response?). Accordingly, the Contingency Cube theory posits that infants are capable of all these sophisticated inferences, because by relying on these three dimensions, they can keep track of the predictability of others’ reactions and decide whether a behavior is, for instance, communicative or not.

In many contexts, conversation turns are a valuable means to participate in social life and have been subject to competition. It is often thought that turn-taking strategies differ by gender; consequently, turn-taking has been a topic of intense examination in gender studies. While early studies supported gendered stereotypes, such as men interrupting more than women and women talking more than men, recent research has found mixed evidence of gender-specific conversational strategies, and few overarching patterns have emerged.

== Organization ==
In conversation analysis, turn-taking organization describes the sets of practices speakers use to construct and allocate turns. The organization of turn-taking was first explored as a part of conversation analysis by Harvey Sacks with Emanuel Schegloff and Gail Jefferson in the late 1960s/early 1970s, and their model is still generally accepted in the field.

Turn-taking structure within a conversation has three components:

- The turn-taking component contains the main content of the utterance and is built from various unit types (turn construction units, or TCUs). The end of a TCU is a point where the turn may end and a new speaker may begin, known as a transition relevance place or TRP.
- The turn allocation component comprises techniques that select the next speaker. There are two types of techniques: those where the current speaker selects the next speaker, and those where the next speaker selects themself.
- Rules govern turn construction and give options to designate the next turn-taker in such a way as to minimize gaps and overlap. Once a TRP is reached, the following rules are applied in order:
1. The current speaker selects the next speaker and transfers the turn to them; or
2. One of the non-speakers self-selects, with the first person to speak claiming the next turn; or
3. No one self-selects, and the current speaker continues until the next TRP or the conversation ends

This order of steps serves to maintain two important elements of conversation: one person speaking at a time and minimized space between when one person stops talking and another begins. Because the system is not optimized for fairness or efficiency, and because turn-taking is not reliant on a set number or type of participants, there are many variations in how turn-taking occurs.

=== Timing ===
Another cue associated with turn-taking is that of timing. Within turn-taking, timing may cue the hearer to know that they have a turn to speak or make an utterance. Due to the very nature of turn-taking and that it is dependent on the context, timing varies within a turn and may be subjective within the conversation. Vocal patterns, such as pitch, specific to the individual also cue the hearer to know how the timing will play out in turn-taking.

Deborah Tannen also shows timing differences in relation to turn-taking. For a particular study, she used a recording of a conversation between a group of her friends at dinner. The group included men and women from across the United States of mixed ethnicities. She concluded that while the amount of space left between speakers may differ, it differs most dramatically between people from different regions. For instance, New Yorkers tend to overlap in conversation, while Californians tend to leave more space between turns and sentences.

Kobin H. Kendrick argues that rules and constraints that are established within a turn-taking system are done so to minimize the amount of time spent transitioning between turns. Not all transitions are minimal; Schlegloff found that transitions before turns that incorporate other-initiations of repair (OIRs; e.g. "what?", "who?") were found to be longer than other transitions.

=== Overlap ===
When more than one person is engaging in a conversation, there is potential for overlapping or interruption while both or many parties are speaking at the same time. Overlapping in turn-taking can be problematic for the people involved. There are four types of overlap including terminal overlaps, continuers, conditional access to the turn, and chordal. Terminal overlaps occur when a speaker assumes the other speaker has or is about to finish their turn and begins to speak, thus creating overlap. Continuers are a way of the hearer acknowledging or understanding what the speaker is saying. As noted by Schegloff, such examples of the continuer's phrases are "mm hm" or "uh huh." Conditional access to the turn implies that the current speaker yields their turn or invites another speaker to interject in the conversation, usually as collaborative effort. Another example that Schegloff illustrates is a speaker invited another to speak out of turn when finding a word in a word search. Chordal consists of a non-serial occurrence of turns; meaning both speakers' turns are occurring at once, such as laughter. The above types of overlap are considered to be non-competitive overlap in conversation.

Schegloff suggested an overlap resolution device, which consists of three parts:

- A set of resources that are used to compete for the turn space
- A set of places where the resources are used
- An interactional logic of the use of those resources at those places

Gail Jefferson proposed a categorization of overlaps in conversation with three types of overlap onsets: transitional overlap, recognitional overlap and progressional overlap.

- Transitional overlap occurs when a speaker enters the conversation at the possible point of completion (i.e. transition relevance place). This occurs frequently when speakers participate in the conversation enthusiastically and exchange speeches with continuity.
- Recognitional overlap occurs when a speaker anticipates the possible remainder of an unfinished sentence, and attempts to finish it for the current speaker. In other words, the overlap arises because the current speaker tries to finish the sentence, when simultaneously the other speaker "thinks aloud" to reflect their understanding of the ongoing speech.
- Progressional overlap occurs as a result of the speech dysfluency of the previous speaker when another speaker self-selects to continue with the ongoing utterance. An example would be when a speaker is retrieving an appropriate word to utter when other speakers make use of this gap to start their turn.

Sacks, one of the first to study conversation, found a correlation between keeping only one person speaking at a time and controlling the amount of silences between speakers. Although there is no limit or specific requirement for the number of speakers in a given conversation, the number of conversations will rise as the number of participants rise.

Overlaps can often be seen as problematic in terms of turn-taking, with the majority of research being between cooperative versus competitive overlap. One theory by Goldberg (1990) argues the dynamic relationship between overlap and power over the conversation by suggesting that two types of overlap are power interruptions and displays of rapport. During conversation, a listener has an obligation to support the speaker. An interruption impedes upon this obligation by infringing upon the wishes of the speaker (which is to be heard). The difference between a power interruption or rapport is the degree to which the speakers' wishes are impeded upon. Rapport interruptions contribute to the conversation in that they ultimately cooperate and collaborate with the speaker in order to reach a mutual goal of understanding. Power interruptions are generally hostile and do not cooperate with the speaker. The goals of the power interruptor are both divergent from and regardless of the goals of the speaker. Power interruptions are further categorized into two types: process control interruptions and content control interruptions. Process control interruptions involve attempts to change the topic by utilizing questions and requests, and because they return control to the original speaker are generally seen as the less threatening of the two. Content control interruptions involve attempts to change the topic by utilizing assertions or statements that are unrelated to the current topic. Content control interruptions are viewed as problematic and threatening since they seize control of both the topic and attention away from the speaker.

However, while overlaps have the potential to be competitive, many overlaps are cooperative. Schegloff concludes that the majority of overlaps are non-problematic. Konakahara et al. explores cooperative overlap by observing 15 graduate students from 11 different lingua-cultural backgrounds in an ELF (English as a lingua franca) conversation, or an English-based conversation among individuals of multiple native languages. Two types of overlap were observed: overlaps that were continuers or assessments and did not substantially contribute to the conversation or demand attention away from the speaker, and overlaps that were questions or statements and moved the conversation forwards. The majority of overlap during the study consisted of continuers or assessments that were non-interruptive. Overlapping questions and their interactional environment were analyzed in particular. It was found that overlapping questions demonstrate the speaker's interest in the conversation and knowledge of the content, act as clarifiers, and progress the conversation. In response, speakers who are interrupted by overlapping questions continue on to clarify their meaning. This suggests that overlapping questions, while interruptive in the fact that they demand attention away from the speaker, are cooperative in nature in that they significantly contribute to achieving mutual understanding and communication.

While Goldberg's study primarily focuses on the distinctions and characteristics between power interrupters and displays of rapport, Konakahara et al. explores the ways in which overlap, in particular overlapping questions, can be collaborative and cooperative.

=== Eye contact ===
During a conversation, turn-taking may involve a cued gaze that prompts the listener that it is their turn or that the speaker is finished talking. There are two gazes that have been identified and associated with turn-taking. The two patterns associated with turn-taking are mutual-break and mutual-hold. Mutual-break is when there is a pause in the conversation and both participants use a momentary break with mutual gaze toward each other, breaking the gaze, then continuing conversation again. This type is correlated with a perceived smoothness due to a decrease in the taking of turns. Mutual-hold is when the speaker also takes a pause in the conversation with mutual gaze, but then still holds the gaze as they start to speak again. Mutual-hold is associated with less successful turn-taking process, because there are more turns taken, thus more turns required to complete.

David Langford also argues that turn-taking is an organizational system. Langford examines facial features, eye contact, and other gestures in order to prove that turn-taking is signaled by many gestures, not only a break in speech. His claims stem from analysis of conversations through speech, sign language, and technology. His comparisons of English and American Sign Language show that turn-taking is systematic and universal across languages and cultures. His research concludes that there is more to turn-taking than simply hearing a pause. As other researchers have shown, eye gaze is an important signal for participants of a conversation to pay attention to. Usually, whoever is speaking will shift their gaze away from the other participants involved in the conversation. When they are finished or about to be finished speaking the speaker will revert their gaze back to the participant that will speak next.

== Cultural variation ==
Turn-taking is developed and socialized from very early on – the first instances being the interactions between parent and child – but it can still be thought of as a learned skill, rather than an innate attribute. Conversational turn-taking is greatly affected by culture. For instance, in Japanese culture, social structure and norms of interaction are reflected in the negotiation of turns in Japanese discourse, specifically with the use of backchannel, or reactive tokens (aizuchi). Backchannel refers to listener responses, mostly phatic expressions, that are made by a listener to support another speaker's flow of speech and right to maintain the floor in conversation. Aizuchi is simply the Japanese term for backchannel, but some linguists make a distinction since aizuchi in Japanese conversation can be considered more varied than in English conversation.

Japanese speakers make use of backchannel far more than American English speakers. In recorded conversations between pairs of same-sex college-age friends, Maynard (1990) found that English-speaking students used backchannel expressions such as uh-huh or right, mainly at grammatical completion points. Less frequently, the English speakers moved their head or laughed while the other speaker paused or after an utterance was completed.

B: Yeah I think I know what you mean./

(A:1 Yeah)

In contrast, the Japanese speakers often produced backchannel expressions such as un or sō while their partner was speaking. They also tended to mark the end of their own utterances with sentence-final particles, and produced vertical head movements near the end of their partner's utterances. Example:

Japanese	Translation
B: Oya kara sureba kodomo ga sureba iya/ [LAUGH]	B: From your parent's view, if the child does... [laugh]
(A:2 Sō sō sō sō)	(A:2 Yeah, yeah, yeah, yeah)
A: Demo oya wa ne mō saikin sō mo	A: But nowadays parents don't
(B:2 Sō)	(B:2 I see)
A: iwanaku-natta kedo	A: say those things

This demonstrates culturally different floor management strategies. The form of backchannels was similar: both Japanese and American subjects used brief utterances and head movements to signal involvement. The Japanese interlocutors, however, produced backchannels earlier and more often throughout conversation, while the Americans limited their responses mainly to pauses between turns.

Additionally, turn-taking can vary in aspects such as time, overlap, and perception of silence in different cultures, but can have universal similarities as well. Stivers et al. (2009) cross-examined ten various indigenous languages across the globe to see if there were any similar underlying foundation in turn-taking. In analyzing these languages, it was discovered that all ten languages had the same avoidance of wanting to overlap in conversation and wanting to minimize the silence between turn-taking. However, depending on the culture, there was variation in the amount of time taken between turns. Stivers claims that their evidence from examining these languages suggests that there is an underlying universal aspect to turn-taking.

== Gender ==
Research has shown that gender is one of many factors that influence the turn-taking strategies between conversation participants. Studies of turn-taking in male-female interactions have yielded mixed results about the exact role of gender in predicting conversational patterns. Such analyses of turn-taking have analyzed conversations in various contexts ranging from verbal exchange between two romantic partners to scripted dialogue in American sitcoms. Rates of interruption are a widely researched area of turn-taking that has elicited various results that conflict with one another, reflecting inconsistencies across studies of gender and turn-taking.

One study reports that male interlocutors systematically interrupt females and tend to dominate conversations, and women are frequently treated in much the same way as children are in conversations. This interruption, however, is not due to female interlocutors' lack of desire or initiative to speak and be heard in a conversation. "Deep" interruption, or interruption at least two syllables before a potential utterance boundary, is perpetuated more frequently by men, towards women, regardless of ways that women negotiate these interruptions.

Other studies suggest that in certain situational contexts, the dominant participants of a conversation will interrupt others regardless of the gender of the speakers. In a study of various romantic relationships, the dominant partners were the ones who interrupted more. Neither the gender of the interrupter nor that of the interrupted partner were correlated with interruption rates.

Language and conversation are primary ways in which social interaction is organized. Unequal conversational patterns are therefore reflective of larger power disparities between men and women. One study by Zimmerman and West found that in same-sex pair conversations, overlap and interruption tend to be equally distributed between the two interlocutors, and interruptions are clustered – that is, only a few of the pairs did all of the interrupting. For opposite-sex pairs, male interlocutors interrupt much more, and interruptions are much more widely distributed – that is, most men did it. Gender differences in turn-taking are not invariable, however, and are related to the conditions and context of the speech. Gendered aspects of speech and turn-taking must be recognized as being reflective of the cultures in which they exist.

Questions have been raised about the correlation between interruption and dominance, and its importance to gender as opposed to other social categories. Studies done by Beattie find status difference more important than gender difference in predicting which speakers interrupted more. In another study done by Krupnick, in a classroom setting, the gender of a conversation moderator, namely the instructor, will affect the turn-taking of male and female speakers. She found that boys talk more than female students in classes taught by men, and although women may speak three times more when the instructor is female, their turns came in very short bursts. Krupnick observes that these conversations maintain a "gender rhythm" which cannot be separated from the academic and authoritative contexts.

== See also ==
- Agency (psychology)
- Conversation Analysis
