= Harvey Molotch =

American sociologist (born 1940)

- Born: January 3, 1940 (age 86); Baltimore, Maryland, US

Academic background
- Education: University of Michigan; University of Chicago

Academic work
- Discipline: sociology
- Sub-discipline: environmental sociology
- Institutions: New York University; University of California, Santa Barbara
- Notable works: Urban Fortunes

Harvey Luskin Molotch (born January 3, 1940) is an American sociologist known for studies that have reconceptualized power relations in interaction, the mass media, and the city. He helped create the field of environmental sociology and has advanced qualitative methods in the social sciences. In recent years, Molotch helped develop a new field—the sociology of objects. He is currently a professor of Sociology and of Metropolitan Studies at New York University. His Introduction to Sociology is featured as one of NYU Open Education's courses available to stream freely. Other courses that he teaches include Approaches to Metropolitan Studies and Urban Objects. He is also affiliated with the graduate program in Humanities and Social Thought.

== Biography ==
Molotch was born Harvey Luskin in Baltimore, Maryland, where his family was in the retail car business on one side and the Luskin's home appliance business on the other. His father, Paul Luskin, died in the Battle of the Bulge in 1944 during World War II. His mother remarried to Nathan Molotch. He received a BA in philosophy from the University of Michigan (1963), with a thesis on John Dewey. He received an MA (1966) and PhD (1968) in sociology from the University of Chicago. He served in the U.S. Army, stationed in Maryland and Virginia, 1961–62.

He taught at the University of California, Santa Barbara from 1967 to 2003. He has also been a visiting professor at Stony Brook University, the University of Essex, and Northwestern University. In 1998-99 he was Centennial Professor at the London School of Economics.

== Ideas ==
=== Racial segregation ===
Molotch's early work on race criticized mainstream strategies then underway to achieve residential integration. To stem transition from all-white to all-black (a major concern at the time), such efforts were curtailing black people's access to housing, and ironically, increasing rather than lessening racial segregation. Molotch presented data to back up his critique, documenting why whites left in the first place and why blacks moved into the vacancies they left behind. Rather than "white flight" and "block busting," racial succession occurred through normal rates of whites moving into the suburbs and blacks, otherwise hindered by racist practice, utilizing opportunities thus provided.

=== Santa Barbara Oil Spill and environmental sociology ===
On January 28, 1969, there was a massive eruption of crude oil from Union Oil's Platform A in the Santa Barbara Channel—an eruption which was to cover much of the coast line of two counties with oil. Molotch saw in this disaster a research opportunity. His article "Oil in Santa Barbara and Power in America" became a founding document of the new field of environmental sociology, and a key contribution to political sociology.

Molotch argued that accident research at the local level might be capable of revealing what political scientists called the "second face of power." This is a dimension of power ordinarily ignored by traditional community studies which fail to concern themselves with the processes by which bias is mobilized and thus how issues rise and fall.

Molotch's findings highlighted the extraordinary intransigence of national institutions in the face of local dissent, but more importantly, pointed out the processes and tactics which undermine that dissent and frustrate and radicalize the dissenters. Molotch called for comparable studies of the agriculture industry, the banking industry, and for more accident research at the local level, which might bring to light the larger social arrangements which structure the parameters of such local debate. In this way, research at the local level might serve as an avenue to knowledge about national power. Molotch ended, "Sociologists should be ready when an accident hits in their neighborhood, and then go to work."

=== Mass media and the social construction framework ===
Molotch helped introduce the social construction framework to the study of news media. Whereas news accounts had been treated, however critically, as "failed" representations of a presumed reality, Molotch and Marilyn Lester held that every account is a product of the social organization that goes into its production. In founding papers in the sociology of the mass media, Molotch and Lester applied the insights of ethnomethodology to the Santa Barbara oil spill and the way it was covered. They argued for an approach to the mass media which does not look for reality, but for practices of those having the power to determine the experience of others.

In addition, Molotch and Lester recognized that this social construction of the news had a crucial political component, a perspective later endorsed by such media sociologists as W. Lance Bennett. In normal times, Molotch and Lester said, the news is merely the ritualized presentation of the stories of powerful corporate and governmental organizations. Only in certain contexts does the veil of this ruling elite consensus get pushed aside to reveal other possible constructions of the facts. Molotch and Lester pointed to such disruptive contexts as scandals and accidents like the Santa Barbara Oil Spill, while Bennett pointed to significant social issues that break through the normally ritualized conflicts of the two political parties.

Molotch's work has inspired studies of the social construction of news, of the particular ways that the content of presentation is contingent on the social setting of its production, including the occupational workplace of news professionals as well as the larger societal setting. His more recent work on mass media has included studies of war protest and the stock market.

=== City as a growth machine ===
Molotch is probably best known for his book Urban Fortunes (1987, with John Logan), which won him the Award for Distinguished Contribution to Sociological Scholarship by the American Sociological Association in 1990. Urban Fortunes builds on Molotch's 1976 classic paper, "The City as a Growth Machine." In this body of work, Molotch took the dominant convention of studying urban land use and turned it on its head. The field of urban sociology (as well as urban geography, planning, and economics) was dominated by the idea that cities were basically containers for human action, in which actors competed among themselves for the most strategic parcels of land, and the real estate market reflected the state of that competition. Out of this competition were thought to come the shape of the city and the distribution of social types within it (e.g. banks in the center, affluent residents in the suburbs). Long established notions such as central place theory and the sectoral hypothesis were claims that are more or less "natural" spatial geography evolved from competitive market activity.

Molotch helped reverse the course of urban theory by pointing out that land parcels were not empty fields awaiting human action, but were associated with specific interests—commercial, sentimental, and psychological. Especially important in shaping cities were the real estate interests of those whose properties gain value when growth takes place. These actors make up what Molotch termed "the local growth machine"—a term now standard in the urban studies lexicon. From this perspective, cities need to be studied (and compared) in terms of the organization, lobbying, manipulating, and structuring carried out by these actors. The outcome—the shape of cities and the distribution of their peoples—is thus not due to an interpersonal market or geographic necessities, but to social actions, including opportunistic dealing. Urban Fortunes has influenced hundreds of national and international studies. A twentieth anniversary edition was issued by the University of California Press in 2007 with a new preface.

=== Other work ===
Molotch has also conducted a series of studies in conversation analysis on mechanisms such as gaps and silences in human conversation that reveal the way power operates at the micro-interactional level. This work includes a notable collaboration with Mitchell Duneier on talk between men on the street and women passersby. His research builds on writings of Don Zimmerman, Harvey Sacks, Gail Jefferson, and Emanuel Schegloff. Molotch was among the first to utilize ethnomethodology and conversation analysis in the study of traditional sociological topics, bridging what had been regarded as a highly esoteric and specialized approach to micro-sociology with mainstream, macro-level sociological issues such as hegemony and power.

He has also written on product design and consumption. His book, Where Stuff Comes From, builds on the work of Howard S. Becker and Bruno Latour, to show how objects and physical artifacts are joint result of various types of actors, most particularly product designers operating within frameworks of technology, regulation, mass tastes, and corporate profits. While neo-Marxists and others have treated "commodity fetishism" as a signal of oppression, repression, and delusion, he uses goods to understand, in a more comprehensive way, just what makes production happen and how artifacts reveal larger social and cultural forces. Still more recently, he turned to analyses of rising cities of the Gulf in the volume The New Arab Urban.

== Honors and awards ==
- W.E.B. Du Bois Career of Distinguished Scholarship Award, American Sociological Association (2019)
- Fred Buttel Distinguished Contribution Award, Section on Environment and Technology, American Sociological Association (2009)
- Lifetime Career Achievement in Urban and Community Scholarship, American Sociological Association Urban and Community Studies Section (2003)
- ASA Journal Article of the Year in Political Sociology (2001)
- Robert E. Park Award of the American Sociological Association (1988) (Urban Fortunes)
- Distinguished Scholarly Publication Award of the American Sociological Association (1990) (Urban Fortunes)
- Scholar in Residence, Russell Sage Foundation, 2008–2009.
- Fellow, Center for Advanced Study in the Behavioral Sciences, Stanford, CA (2000)
- Resident Fellow, Rockefeller Foundation, Bellagio Center, Como Italy (1999)
- Stice Lecturer in the Social Sciences, University of Washington, Seattle (1996)
- Distinguished Visiting professor, University of Lund, Sweden (1995)

== Selected publications ==
- The New Arab Urban: Cities of Wealth, Ambition, and Distress (co-edited with Davide Ponzini) New York University Press (2019)
- Against Security: How We Go Wrong at Airports, Subways, and Other Sites of Ambiguous Danger. Princeton University Press (2012)
- Toilet: The Public Restroom and the Politics of Sharing. [co-edited with Laura Noren] New York: New York University Press (2010).
- Where Stuff Comes From: How Toasters, Toilets, Cars, Computers and Many Other Things Come to Be as They Are. New York and London: Routledge (2003).
- Urban Fortunes: The Political Economy of Place. (With John Logan.) Berkeley and Los Angeles: University of California Press. 1987.
- "The City as a Growth Machine: Toward a Political Economy of Place." The American Journal of Sociology, Vol. 82, No. 2 (Sep., 1976), pp. 309–332.
- "News as Purposive Behavior: On the Strategic Use of Routine Events, Accidents, and Scandals," American Sociological Review, Vol 39, No. 1 (Feb., 1974), pp. 101–112.
- Managed Integration: Dilemmas of Doing Good in the City. Berkeley: University of California Press (1972).
