= Turn construction unit =

A turn construction unit (TCU) is the fundamental segment of speech in a conversation, as analysed in conversation analysis.

The idea was introduced in "A Simplest Systematics for the Organization of Turn-Taking for Conversation" by Harvey Sacks, Emanuel Schegloff, and Gail Jefferson in 1974. It describes pieces of conversation which may comprise an entire speaking turn by a speaker. The model is designed to explain that when people talk in conversation, they do not always talk all at the same time, but generally, one person speaks at a time, and then another person can follow. Such a contribution to a conversation by one speaker is then a turn. A turn is created through certain forms or units that listeners can recognize and count on, called turn construction units (TCUs), and speakers and listeners will know that such forms can be a word or a clause, and use that knowledge to predict when a speaker is finished so that others can speak, to avoid or minimize both overlap and silence.

A listener will look for the places where they can start speaking - so-called transition relevant places (TRPs) - based on how the units appear over time. A TRP marks a point where the turn may go to another speaker, or the present speaker may continue with another TCU.

The model also leaves puzzles to be solved, for example concerning how turn boundaries are identified and projected, and the role played by gaze and body orientation in the management of turn-taking. It also establishes some questions for other disciplines: for example, the split second timing of turn-transition sets up a cognitive 'bottle neck' in which potential speakers must attend to incoming speech while also preparing their own contribution - something which imposes a heavy load of human processing capacity, and which may impact the structure of languages.

Interaction in more specialized, institutional environments such as meetings, courts, news interviews and mediation hearings has distinctive turn-taking organizations that depart in various ways from ordinary conversation. Studies have looked at institutional interaction and turn-taking in institutional contexts.

A pair of TCUs making up an utterance and a response from another is known as an adjacency pair.

== Transition relevance place ==
A transition relevance place (TRP) is a point of possible completion (or potential end) of an utterance (hence a TCU) where speaker change is a possible next action.

== Turn allocation ==
Each time a turn is over, speakers also have to decide who can talk next, and this is called turn allocation. The rules for turn allocation are commonly formulated in the same way as in the original Simplest Systematics paper, with 2 parts where the first consists of 3 elements:

  - a. If the current speaker selects a next one to speak at the end of current TCU (by name, gaze or contextual aspects of what is said), the selected speaker has the right and obligation to speak next.
  - b. If the current speaker does not select a next speaker, other potential speakers have the right to self-select (the first starter gets the turn)
  - c. If options 1a and 1b have not been implemented, current speaker may continue with another TCU.
1. At the end of that TCU, the option system applies again.

Some types of turns may require extra work before they can successfully take place. Speakers wanting a long turn, for example to tell a story or describe important news, must first establish that others will not intervene during the course of the telling through some form of preface and approval by the listener (a so-called go-ahead). The preface and its associated go-ahead comprise a pre-sequence. Conversations cannot be appropriately ended by 'just stopping', but require a special closing sequence.

== Classifications ==
=== Role types ===
Four types of TCU can be distinguished through the form of the utterance:

- Lexical TCU: e.g. "Yes", "There"
- Phrasal TCU: e.g. "In the basket", "out of here"
- Clausal TCU: e.g. "When I am free", "If I got the job"
- Sentential TCU: e.g. "I am working on my thesis", "He has got my car"

=== Unit design types ===
TCUs can be created or recognized via four methods, i.e. types of unit design:

- Grammatical methods, i.e. morphosyntactic structures.
- Prosodic methods, e.g. pitch, speed and changes in pronunciation.
- Pragmatic methods: turns perform actions, and at the point where listeners have heard enough and know enough, a turn can be pragmatically complete.
- Visual methods: Gesture, gaze and body movement is also used to indicate that a turn is over. For example, a person speaking looks at the next speaker when their turn is about to end.

Scholars debate over the relative significance of the above four resources as signifiers of the end of an utterance.

== Types of silence ==
Based on the turn-taking system, three types of silence may be distinguished:

- Pause: A period of silence within a speaker's TCU, i.e. during a speaker's turn when a sentence is not finished.
- Gap: A period of silence between turns, for example after a question has been asked and not yet answered
- Lapse: A period of silence when no sequence or other structured activity is in progress: the current speaker stops talking, does not select a next speaker, and no one self selects. Lapses are commonly associated with visual or other forms of disengagement between speakers, even if these periods are brief.
