= Christian Heath =

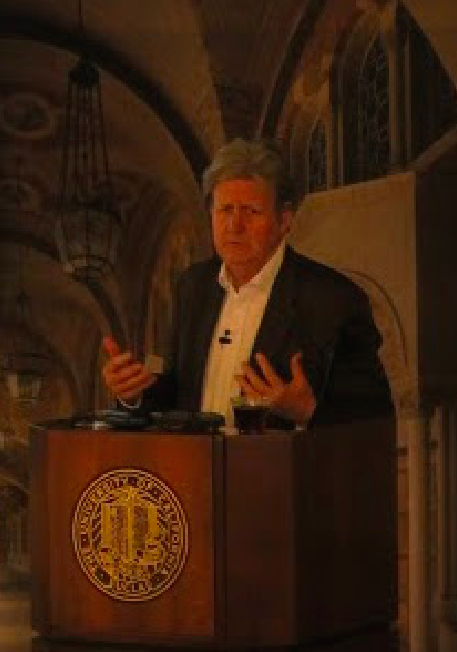
Christian Heath presenting a recent paper, 2017

Christian Heath is Professor of Work and Interaction at King's College London. He is known for his research in which he uses video to analyse social interaction in everyday settings in particular the workplace.

== Career ==
In 1977 Heath was appointed Research Fellow in the Department of General Practice, University of Manchester working with the late Professor P.S Byrne. In 1986 Heath published Body Movement and Speech in Medical Interaction which drew on ethnomethodology and conversation analysis to analyse multimodal communication in the general practice consultations, including the physical examination, the opening and closing of the consultation and the use of medical records and early computers.

In 1988 while continuing research on medical interaction, including studies of diagnosis, the expression of pain, and the management of embarrassment, he was granted leave from the University of Surrey firstly to undertake an Alexandra von Humboldt Stiftung Fellowship at the University of Constance with Thomas Luckmann and then to become a visiting senior fellow at the EuroPARC, (the European base of Xerox PARC at that time) in Cambridge. With Paul Luff he explored the interactional foundations of technology use in a variety of settings, including architectural practices, medical consultations and the control rooms of London Underground. These projects and the collaboration with Paul Luff led to the organization of the Work, Interaction and Technology (WIT) Research Group, now Research Centre. Since 1998 WIT has been based at King's College London.

In 2000 Heath published Technology in Action which addressed diverse issues including collaborative production of news stories, teamwork in traffic control, and the interactional incongruities that arise in media spaces and virtual environments. These studies became part of the emerging fields of Workplace Studies and CSCW (Computer Supported Cooperative Work) and contributed to knowledge of embodied action and multimodal interaction in ethnomethodology and conversation analysis. Heath's research was undertaken in close collaboration with industry and the public services; the results were used in the design and development of paper-digital technologies, media spaces and virtual environments, and also in the creation of systems to enable event recognition for European transport operators including London Underground and the RATP Paris.

In the late 1990s, Heath continued to study work and organisation, medical and healthcare settings and auctions of art and antiques. He collaborated with Dirk vom Lehn, Jason Cleverly and colleagues at WIT, to examine communication in museums, galleries and science centres, focusing on how people engage and respond to exhibits and exhibitions through social interaction. The programme of research involved close collaboration with museums and galleries in the UK and abroad including the Science Museum London, Tate Britain, the V&A and the Exploratorium San Francisco.

In 2010, with Jon Hindmarsh and Paul Luff, he published Video in Qualitative Research, an introduction to using video analysis in the study of social interaction in everyday life.

Since 1998 Heath has also been series editor with Roy Pea and Lucy Suchman of the Cambridge University Press book series Learning and Doing: Social Cognitive and Computational Perspectives.

A Festschrift was held for Christian Heath at the University of Bayreuth in 2012.

In 2013 Heath published The Dynamics of Auction: Social Interaction and the Sale of Fine Art and Antiques. It was awarded the Prize for the Best Book (2010-2014) by the International Society for Conversation Analysis.

In 2014, Christian Heath was presented with the EUSSET-IISI Lifetime Achievement Award - awarded to scholars for an outstanding contribution to the reorientation of the fields of computing and informatics.

In 2014 he became a Freeman of the Worshipful Company of Arts Scholars and was granted the Freedom of the City of London in 2015.

He is a fellow of the Academy of Social Sciences.

== Selected publications ==
- Heath, Christian (2002). "Demonstrative suffering: the gestural (re)embodiment of symptoms". Journal of Communication. 52 (3): 597–617. doi:10.1093/joc/52.3.597.
- Heath, Christian (1986). Body Movement and Speech in Medical Interaction. Cambridge: Cambridge University Press. ISBN 9780521253352.
- Luff, Paul; Hindmarsh, Jon; Heath, Christian (2000). Workplace Studies: Recovering Work Practice and Informing System Design. Cambridge: Cambridge University Press.
- Heath, Christian; Button, Graham (2002). "Special Issue on Workplace Studies". British Journal of Sociology.
- Schmidt, Kjeld; Heath, Christian; Rodden, Tom (2002). "Special Double Issue on Awareness in CSCW". International Journal of Computer Support for Cooperative Work.
- Heath, Christian (2013). The Dynamics of Auction: Social Interaction and the Sale of Fine Art and Antiques. Cambridge: Cambridge University Press.
- Heath, Christian; vom Lehn, Dirk (2004). "Configuring reception: looking at exhibits in museums and galleries". Theory, Culture and Society. 21 (6): 43–65. doi:10.1177/0263276404047415. S2CID 59248452.
- Heath, Christian; Hindmarsh, Jon; Luff, Paul (2010). Video in Qualitative Research: Analysing Social Interaction in Everyday Life. London: Sage.
- Heath, C.C. and P. Luff (2000) Technology in Action Cambridge: Cambridge University Press
