= Ethnomethodology =

Study of how social order is produced

Ethnomethodology is the study of how social order is produced in and through processes of social interaction. It generally seeks to provide an alternative to mainstream sociological approaches. It can be seen as posing a challenge to the social sciences as a whole, as it re-specifies the assumed phenomena of those sciences as being themselves social achievements. Its early investigations led to the founding of conversation analysis, which has found its own place as an accepted discipline within the academy. According to Psathas, it is possible to distinguish five major approaches within the ethnomethodological family of disciplines (see § Varieties).

Ethnomethodology is a fundamentally descriptive discipline which does not engage in the explanation or evaluation of the particular social order undertaken as a topic of study. It seeks "to discover the things that persons in particular situations do, the methods they use, to create the patterned orderliness of social life". However, applications have been found within many applied disciplines, such as software design and management studies.

== Definition ==
The term's meaning can be broken down into its three constituent parts: ethno – method – ology, for the purpose of explanation. Using an appropriate Southern California example: ethno refers to a particular socio-cultural group (for example, a particular, local community of surfers); method refers to the methods and practices this particular group employs in its everyday activities (for example, related to surfing); and ology refers to the systematic description of these methods and practices. The focus of the investigation used in our example is the social order of surfing, the ethnomethodological interest is in the "how" (the methods and practices) of the production and maintenance of this social order. In essence ethnomethodology attempts to create classifications of the social actions of individuals within groups through drawing on the experience of the groups directly, without imposing on the setting the opinions of the researcher with regards to social order, as is the case with other forms of sociological investigation.

== Origin and scope ==
The approach was originally developed by Harold Garfinkel, who attributed its origin to his work investigating the conduct of jury members in 1954. His interest was in describing the common sense methods through which members of a jury produce themselves in a jury room as a jury. Thus, their methods for: establishing matters of fact; developing evidence chains; determining the reliability of witness testimony; establishing the organization of speakers in the jury room itself; and determining the guilt or innocence of defendants, etc. are all topics of interest. Such methods serve to constitute the social order of being a juror for the members of the jury, as well as for researchers and other interested parties, in that specific social setting.

This interest developed out of Garfinkel's critique of Talcott Parsons' attempt to derive a general theory of society. This critique originated in his reading of Alfred Schutz, though Garfinkel ultimately revised many of Schutz's ideas. Garfinkel also drew on his study of the principles and practices of financial accounting; the classic sociological theory and methods of Durkheim and Weber; and the traditional sociological concern with the Hobbesian "problem of order".

For the ethnomethodologist, participants produce the order of social settings through their shared sense making practices. Thus, there is an essential natural reflexivity between the activity of making sense of a social setting and the ongoing production of that setting; the two are in effect identical. Furthermore, these practices (or methods) are witnessably enacted, making them available for study. This opens up a broad and multi-faceted area of inquiry. John Heritage writes: "In its open-ended reference to [the study of] any kind of sense-making procedure, the term represents a signpost to a domain of uncharted dimensions rather than a staking out of a clearly delineated territory."

== Theory and methods ==
Ethnomethodology has often perplexed commentators, due to its radical approach to questions of theory and method. With regard to theory, Garfinkel has consistently advocated an attitude of ethnomethodological indifference, a principled agnosticism with regard to social theory which insists that the shared understandings of members of a social setting under study take precedence over any concepts which a social theorist might bring to the analysis from outside that setting. This can be perplexing to traditional social scientists, trained in the need for social theory. A multiplicity of theoretical references by Anne Rawls, in her introduction to Ethnomethodology's Program, might be interpreted to suggest a softening of this position towards the end of Garfinkel's life. However, the position is consistent with ethnomethodology's understanding of the significance of "member's methods", and with certain lines of philosophical thought regarding the philosophy of science (Polanyi 1958; Kuhn 1970; Feyerabend 1975), and the study of the actual practices of scientific procedure. It also has a strong correspondence with the later philosophy of Ludwig Wittgenstein, especially as applied to social studies by Peter Winch.

Regarding theory, Garfinkel's work references the phenomenology of Husserl, Gurwitsch, Merleau-Ponty and, most frequently, to the works of the social phenomenologist Alfred Schutz. Sociologists Talcott Parsons and Emile Durkheim are also frequently referenced. However, the emphasis is upon 'misreading' texts, intended to refer to the activity of "misreading a description as instructions, the work of following which exhibits the phenomenon that the text describes." Ethnomethodology's policy of ethnomethodological indifference and its unique adequacy requirement of methods explicitly reject commitment to any sociological or philosophical theory.

Similarly, ethnomethodology advocates no formal methods of enquiry, insisting that the research method be dictated by the nature of the phenomenon that is being studied. Ethnomethodologists have conducted their studies in a variety of ways, and the point of these investigations is "to discover the things that persons in particular situations do, the methods they use, to create the patterned orderliness of social life". Michael Lynch has noted that: "Leading figures in the field have repeatedly emphasised that there is no obligatory set of methods [employed by ethnomethodologists], and no prohibition against using any research procedure whatsoever, if it is adequate to the particular phenomena under study".

== Some leading policies, methods and definitions ==
The fundamental assumption of ethnomethodological studies
As characterised by Anne Rawls, speaking for Garfinkel: "If one assumes, as Garfinkel does, that the meaningful, patterned, and orderly character of everyday life is something that people must work to achieve, then one must also assume that they have some methods for doing so". That is, "...members of society must have some shared methods that they use to mutually construct the meaningful orderliness of social situations."
Ethnomethodology is an empirical enterprise
Rawls states: "Ethnomethodology is a thoroughly empirical enterprise devoted to the discovery of social order and intelligibility [sense making] as witnessable collective achievements." "The keystone of the [ethnomethodological] argument is that local [social] orders exist; that these orders are witnessable in the scenes in which they are produced; and that the possibility of [their] intelligibility is based on the actual existence and detailed enactment of these orders." Ethnomethodology is not, however, conventionally empiricist. Its empirical nature is specified in the weak form of the unique adequacy requirement.
The unique adequacy requirement of methods (weak form)
is that the researcher should have a 'vulgar competence' in the research setting. That is, they should be able to function as an ordinary member of that setting.
The unique adequacy requirement of methods (strong form)
is identical to the requirement for ethnomethodological indifference.
Ethnomethodological indifference
This is the policy of deliberate agnosticism, or indifference, towards the dictates, prejudices, methods and practices of sociological analysis as traditionally conceived (examples: theories of "deviance", analysis of behavior as rule governed, role theory, institutional (de)formations, theories of social stratification, etc.). Dictates and prejudices which serve to pre-structure traditional social scientific investigations independently of the subject matter taken as a topic of study, or the investigatory setting being subjected to scrutiny. The policy of ethnomethodological indifference is specifically not to be conceived of as indifference to the problem of social order taken as a group (member's) concern.
First time through
This is the practice of attempting to describe any social activity, regardless of its routine or mundane appearance, as if it were happening for the very first time. This is in an effort to expose how the observer of the activity assembles, or constitutes, the activity for the purposes of formulating any particular description. The point of such an exercise is to make available and underline the complexities of sociological analysis and description, particularly the indexical and reflexive properties of the actors', or observer's, own descriptions of what is taking place in any given situation. Such an activity will also reveal the observer's inescapable reliance on the hermeneutic circle as the defining "methodology" of social understanding for both lay persons and social scientists.
Breaching experiment
A method for revealing, or exposing, the common work that is performed by members of particular social groups in maintaining a clearly recognisable and shared social order. For example, driving the wrong way down a busy one-way street can reveal myriads of useful insights into the patterned social practices, and moral order, of the community of road users. The point of such an exercise—a person pretending to be a stranger or boarder in their own household—is to demonstrate that gaining insight into the work involved in maintaining any given social order can often best be revealed by breaching that social order and observing the results of that breach—especially those activities related to the reassembly of that social order, and the normalisation of that social setting.
Sacks' gloss
A question about an aspect of the social order that recommends, as a method of answering it, that the researcher should seek out members of society who, in their daily lives, are responsible for the maintenance of that aspect of the social order. This is in opposition to the idea that such questions are best answered by a sociologist. Sacks' original question concerned objects in public places and how it was possible to see that such objects did or did not belong to somebody. He found his answer in the activities of police officers who had to decide whether cars were abandoned.
Durkheim's aphorism
Durkheim famously recommended: "our basic principle, that of the objectivity of social facts". This is usually taken to mean that we should assume the objectivity of social facts as a principle of study (thus providing the basis of sociology as a science). Garfinkel's alternative reading of Durkheim is that we should treat the objectivity of social facts as an achievement of society's members, and make the achievement process itself the focus of study. An ethnomethodological respecification of Durkheim's statement via a "misreading" (see below) of his quote appears above. There is also a textual link/rationale provided in the literature. Both links involve a leap of faith on the part of the reader; that is, we don't believe that one method for this interpretation is necessarily better than the other, or that one form of justification for such an interpretation outweighs its competitor.
Accounts
Accounts are the ways members signify, describe or explain the properties of a specific social situation. They can consist of both verbal and non-verbal objectifications. They are always both indexical to the situation in which they occur (see below), and, simultaneously reflexive—they serve to constitute that situation. An account can consist of something as simple as a wink of the eye, a material object evidencing a state of affairs (documents, etc.), or something as complex as a story detailing the boundaries of the universe.
Indexicality
The concept of indexicality is a key core concept for ethnomethodology. Garfinkel states that it was derived from the concept of indexical expressions appearing in ordinary language philosophy (1967), wherein a statement is considered to be indexical insofar as it is dependent for its sense upon the context in which it is embedded (Bar-Hillel 1954:359–379). The phenomenon is acknowledged in various forms of analytical philosophy, and sociological theory and methods, but is considered to be both limited in scope and remedied through specification operationalisation. In ethnomethodology, the phenomenon is universalised to all forms of language and behavior, and is deemed to be beyond remedy for the purposes of establishing a scientific description and explanation of social behavior. The consequence of the degree of contextual dependence for a "segment" of talk or behavior can range from the problem of establishing a "working consensus" regarding the description of a phrase, concept or behavior, to the end-game of social scientific description itself. Note that any serious development of the concept must eventually assume a theory of meaning as its foundation (see Gurwitsch 1985). Without such a foundational underpinning, both the traditional social scientist and the ethnomethodologist are relegated to merely telling stories around the campfire (Brooks 1974).
Misreading (a text)
Misreading a text, or fragments of a text, does not denote making an erroneous reading of a text in whole or in part. As Garfinkel states, it means to denote an "alternate reading" of a text or fragment of a text. As such, the original and its misreading do not "translate point to point" but, "instead, they go together". No criteria are offered for the translation of an original text and its misreading—the outcome of such translations are in Garfinkel's term: "incommensurable." The misreading of texts or fragments of texts is a standard feature of ethnomethodology's way of doing theory, especially in regards to topics in phenomenology.
Reflexivity
Despite the fact that many sociologists use "reflexivity" as a synonym for "self-reflection," the way the term is used in ethnomethodology is different: it is meant "to describe the acausal and non-mentalistic determination of meaningful action-in-context". See also: Reflexivity (social theory).
Documentary method of interpretation
The documentary method is the method of understanding utilised by everyone engaged in trying to make sense of their social world—this includes the ethnomethodologist. Garfinkel recovered the concept from the work of Karl Mannheim and repeatedly demonstrates the use of the method in the case studies appearing in his central text, Studies in Ethnomethodology. Mannheim defined the term as a search for an identical homologous pattern of meaning underlying a variety of totally different realisations of that meaning. Garfinkel states that the documentary method of interpretation consists of treating an actual appearance as the "document of", "as pointing to", as "standing on behalf of", a presupposed underlying pattern. These "documents" serve to constitute the underlying pattern, but are themselves interpreted on the basis of what is already known about that underlying pattern. This seeming paradox is quite familiar to hermeneuticians who understand this phenomenon as a version of the hermeneutic circle. This phenomenon is also subject to analysis from the perspective of Gestalt theory (part/whole relationships), and the phenomenological theory of perception.
Social orders
Theoretically speaking, the object of ethnomethodological research is social order taken as a group member's concern. Methodologically, social order is made available for description in any specific social setting as an accounting of specific social orders: the sensible coherencies of accounts that order a specific social setting for the participants relative to a specific social project to be realised in that setting. Social orders themselves are made available for both participants and researchers through phenomena of order: the actual accounting of the partial (adumbrated) appearances of these sensibly coherent social orders. These appearances (parts, adumbrates) of social orders are embodied in specific accounts, and employed in a particular social setting by the members of the particular group of individuals party to that setting. Specific social orders have the same formal properties as identified by A. Gurwitsch in his discussion of the constituent features of perceptual noema, and, by extension, the same relationships of meaning described in his account of Gestalt Contextures (see Gurwitsch 1964:228–279). As such, it is little wonder that Garfinkel states: "you can't do anything unless you do read his texts".
Ethnomethodology's field of investigation
For ethnomethodology the topic of study is the social practices of real people in real settings, and the methods by which these people produce and maintain a shared sense of social order.

== Differences with sociology ==
Since ethnomethodology has become anathema to certain sociologists, and since those practicing it like to perceive their own efforts as constituting a radical break from prior sociologies, there has been little attempt to link ethnomethodology to these prior sociologies. However, whilst ethnomethodology is distinct from sociological methods, it does not seek to compete with it, or provide remedies for any of its practices. The ethnomethodological approach differs as much from the sociological approach as sociology does from psychology even though both speak of social action. This does not mean that ethnomethodology does not use traditional sociological forms as a sounding board for its own programmatic development, or to establish benchmarks for the differences between traditional sociological forms of study and ethnomethodology as it only means that ethnomethodology was not established in order to: repair, criticize, undermine, or poke fun at traditional sociological forms. In essence the distinctive difference between sociological approaches and ethnomethodology is that the latter adopts a commonsense attitude towards knowledge.

In contrast to traditional sociological forms of inquiry, it is a hallmark of the ethnomethodological perspective that it does not make theoretical or methodological appeals to: outside assumptions regarding the structure of an actor or actors' characterisation of social reality; refer to the subjective states of an individual or groups of individuals; attribute conceptual projections such as, "value states", "sentiments", "goal orientations", "mini-max economic theories of behavior", etc., to any actor or group of actors; or posit a specific "normative order" as a transcendental feature of social scenes, etc.

For the ethnomethodologist, the methodic realisation of social scenes takes place within the actual setting under scrutiny, and is structured by the participants in that setting through the reflexive accounting of that setting's features. The job of the ethnomethodologist is to describe the methodic character of these activities, not account for them in a way that transcends that which is made available in and through the actual accounting practices of the individual's party to those settings.

The differences can therefore be summed up as follows:

1. While traditional sociology usually offers an analysis of society which takes the facticity (factual character, objectivity) of the social order for granted, ethnomethodology is concerned with the procedures (practices, methods) by which that social order is produced, and shared.
2. While traditional sociology usually provides descriptions of social settings which compete with the actual descriptions offered by the individuals who are party to those settings, ethnomethodology seeks to describe the procedures (practices, methods) these individuals use in their actual descriptions of those settings.

== Varieties ==
According to George Psathas, five types of ethnomethodological study can be identified (Psathas 1995:139–155). These may be characterised as:

1. The organisation of practical actions and practical reasoning. Including the earliest studies, such as those in Garfinkel's seminal Studies in Ethnomethodology.
2. The organisation of talk-in-interaction. More recently known as conversation analysis, Harvey Sacks established this approach in collaboration with his colleagues Emanuel Schegloff and Gail Jefferson.
3. Talk-in-interaction within institutional or organisational settings. While early studies focused on talk abstracted from the context in which it was produced (usually using tape recordings of telephone conversations) this approach seeks to identify interactional structures that are specific to particular settings.
4. The study of work. 'Work' is used here to refer to any social activity. The analytic interest is in how that work is accomplished within the setting in which it is performed.
5. The haecceity of work. Just what makes an activity what it is? e.g. what makes a test a test, a competition a competition, or a definition a definition?

Further discussion of the varieties and diversity of ethnomethodological investigations can be found in Maynard & Clayman's work.

== Relationship with conversation analysis ==
The relationship between ethnomethodology and conversation analysis has been contentious at times, given their overlapping interests, the close collaboration between their founders and the subsequent divergence of interest among many practitioners. In as much as the study of social orders is "inexorably intertwined" with the constitutive features of talk about those social orders, ethnomethodology is committed to an interest in both conversational talk, and the role this talk plays in the constitution of that order. Talk is seen as indexical and embedded in a specific social order. It is also naturally reflexive to and constitutive of that order. Anne Rawls pointed out: "Many, in fact most, of those who have developed a serious interest in ethnomethodology have also used conversation analysis, developed by Sacks, Schegloff, and Jefferson, as one of their research tools."

On the other hand, where the study of conversational talk is divorced from its situated context—that is, when it takes on the character of a purely technical method and "formal analytic" enterprise in its own right—it is not a form of ethnomethodology. The "danger" of misunderstanding here, as Rawls notes, is that conversation analysis can become just another formal analytic enterprise, like any other formal method which brings an analytical toolbox of preconceptions, formal definitions, and operational procedures to the situation/setting under study. When such analytical concepts are generated from within one setting and conceptually applied (generalised) to another, the (re)application represents a violation of the strong form of the unique adequacy requirement of methods.

== Links with phenomenology ==
Even though ethnomethodology has been characterised as having a "phenomenological sensibility", and reliable commentators have acknowledged that "there is a strong influence of phenomenology on ethnomethodology" (Maynard and Kardash 2007:1484), some orthodox adherents to the discipline—those who follow the teachings of Garfinkel—do not explicitly represent it as a form of phenomenology.

Garfinkel speaks of phenomenological texts and findings as being "appropriated" for the purposes of exploring topics in the study of social order. Even though ethnomethodology is not a form of phenomenology, the reading and understanding of phenomenological texts, and developing the capability of seeing phenomenologically is essential to the praxis of ethnomethodological studies. As Garfinkel states in regard to the work of the phenomenologist Aron Gurwitsch, especially his Field of Consciousness (1964: ethnomethodology's phenomenological urtext): "you can't do anything unless you do read his texts".
