= Harold Garfinkel =

American sociologist (1917 – 2011)

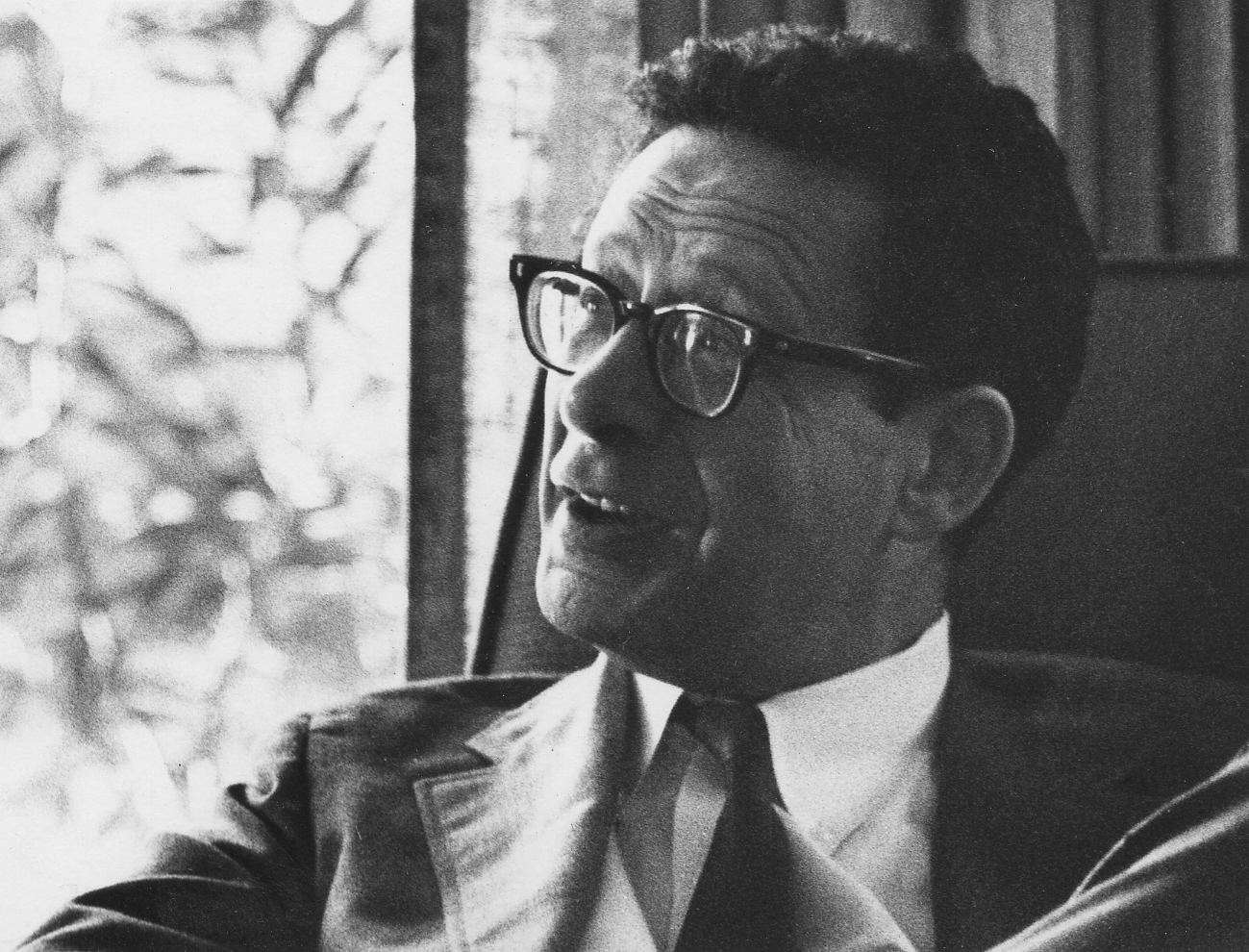
- Born: October 29, 1917; Newark, New Jersey, US
- Died: April 21, 2011 (aged 93); Los Angeles, California, US
- Known for: Studies in Ethnomethodology
- Spouse: Arlene Steinbeck
- Scientific career
- Fields: Sociological theory; social theory
- Doctoral advisor: Talcott Parsons

Harold Garfinkel (October 29, 1917 – April 21, 2011) was an American sociologist and ethnomethodologist, who taught at the University of California, Los Angeles. Having developed and established ethnomethodology as a field of inquiry in sociology, he is probably best known for Studies in Ethnomethodology (1967), a collection of articles. Selections from unpublished materials were later published in two volumes: Seeing Sociologically and Ethnomethodology's Program. Moreover, during his time at University of Newark, which became Rutgers University, he enrolled in Theory of Accounts, a course that covered accounting and bookkeeping procedures. Garfinkel realized from this class "even in setting up an accounting sheet, he was theorizing the various categories into which the numbers would be placed" which furthered his understanding of accountability.

== Biography ==
=== Youth and education ===
Harold Garfinkel was born in Newark, New Jersey on October 29, 1917, where he grew up in a Jewish family. His father, a furniture dealer, had hoped his son would follow him into the family business, but while he did work with his father, Garfinkel enrolled at the University of Newark to study accounting. At the University of Newark, courses were mainly taught by Columbia graduate students, whose theoretical approach guided Garfinkel later on. In the summer following graduation, Garfinkel volunteered at a Quaker work camp in Cornelia, Georgia, where he worked with students from diverse backgrounds who demonstrated a wide variety of interests, influencing his decision to later take up sociology as a career. While volunteering in Georgia, Garfinkel learned about the sociology program at the University of North Carolina. This program specifically focused on public work projects like the one Garfinkel was working on.

Garfinkel completed his master's in 1942 at the University of North Carolina at Chapel Hill after writing his thesis on interracial homicide under the supervision of Howard W. Odum. Garfinkel wrote the short story "Color Trouble", which was first published in the journal Opportunity in 1940, and discussed the victimization of segregated black women traveling on a bus in Virginia. His short story was based on the actual experience of civil rights attorney and activist Pauli Murray, and her housemate Adelene McBean, while traveling from Washington, D.C. to Murray's childhood home in Durham, North Carolina. With the onset of World War II, he was drafted into the Army Air Corps and served as a trainer at a base in Florida. As the war effort wound down he was transferred to Gulfport, Mississippi, where he met his wife and lifelong partner, Arlene Steinback. Harold died from congestive heart failure on April 21, 2011, in his home in Los Angeles, leaving his wife Arlene behind.

=== Harvard Department of Social Relations ===
After the war, Garfinkel went to study at Harvard and met Talcott Parsons at the newly formed Department of Social Relations at Harvard University. While Parsons studied and emphasized abstract categories and generalizations, Garfinkel's work was more focused on detailed description. "What set Garfinkel apart from Parsons's other students and colleagues was his extreme commitment to empirical studies. Rather than ask, for example, what kinds of normative networks are necessary to sustain family structures, Garfinkel would more likely ask: 'What normative networks are there?' or 'Are there any normative networks?'" While Garfinkel continued to earn his degree at Harvard, sociologist Wilbert E. Moore, invited Garfinkel to work on the Organizational Behavior Project at Princeton University. Garfinkel taught at Princeton University for two years. This brought him in contact with some of the most prominent scholars of the day in the behavioral, informational, and social sciences including: Gregory Bateson, Kenneth Burke, Paul Lazarsfeld, Frederick Mosteller, Philip Selznick, Herbert A. Simon, and John von Neumann. Garfinkel completed his dissertation, "The Perception of the Other: A Study in Social Order," in 1952.

After receiving his doctorate from Harvard, Garfinkel was asked to talk at a 1954 American Sociological Association meeting and created the term "ethnomethodology." In addition, he was working alongside other people to listen to tape recordings and interview jurors for the University of Chicago's American Jury Project, which is led by Fred Strodtbeck which also furthered his research in Ethnomethodology. Ethnomethodology became his main focus of study. It is "the investigation of the rational properties of indexical expressions and other practical actions as contingent ongoing accomplishments of organized artful practices of everyday life" In 1954 he joined the sociology faculty at UCLA. During the period 1963–64 he served as a Research Fellow at the Center for the Scientific Study of Suicide. Garfinkel spent the '75-'76 school year at the Center for Advanced Study in the Behavioral Sciences and, in 1979–1980, was a visiting fellow at Oxford University. In 1995 he was awarded the "Cooley-Mead Award" from the American Sociological Association for his contributions to the field. He received an honorary doctorate from the University of Nottingham in 1996. He officially retired from UCLA in 1987, though continued as an emeritus professor until his death on April 21, 2011.

== Influences ==
Garfinkel was very intrigued by Parsons' study of social order. Parsons sought to offer a solution to the problem of social order (i.e., How do we account for the order that we witness in society?) and, in so doing, provide a disciplinary foundation for research in sociology. Drawing on the work of earlier social theorists (Marshall, Pareto, Durkheim, Weber), Parsons postulated that all social action could be understood in terms of an "action frame" consisting of a fixed number of elements (an agent, a goal or intended end, the circumstances within which the act occurs, and its "normative orientation"). Agents make choices among possible ends, alternative means to these ends, and the normative constraints that might be seen as operative. They conduct themselves, according to Parsons, in a fashion "analogous to the scientist whose knowledge is the principal determinant of his action." Order, by this view, is not imposed from above, but rather arises from rational choices made by the actor. Parsons sought to develop a theoretical framework for understanding how social order is accomplished through these choices.

Ethnomethodology was not designed to supplant the kind of formal analysis recommended by Parsons. Garfinkel stipulated that the two programs are "different and unavoidably related." Both seek to give accounts of social life, but ask different kinds of questions and formulate quite different sorts of claims. Sociologists operating within the formal program endeavor to produce objective (that is to say, non-indexical) claims similar in scope to those made in the natural sciences. To do so, they must employ theoretical constructs that pre-define the shape of the social world. Unlike Parsons, and other social theorists before and since, Garfinkel's goal was not to articulate yet another explanatory system. He expressed an "indifference" to all forms of sociological theorizing. Instead of viewing social practice through a theoretical lens, Garfinkel sought to explore the social world directly and describe its autochthonous workings in elaborate detail. Durkheim famously stated, "[t]he objective reality of social facts is sociology's fundamental principle." Garfinkel substituted 'phenomenon' for 'principle', signaling a different approach to sociological inquiry. The task of sociology, as he envisions it, is to conduct investigations into just how Durkheim's social facts are brought into being. The result is an "alternate, asymmetric and incommensurable" program of sociological inquiry.

Alfred Schütz, a European scholar and acquaintance of Garfinkel introduced the young sociologist to newly emerging ideas in social theory, psychology and phenomenology. Schütz, like Parsons, was concerned with establishing a sound foundation for research in the social sciences. He took issue, however, with the Parsonsian assumption that actors in society always behave rationally. Schütz made a distinction between reasoning in the 'natural attitude' and scientific reasoning. The reasoning of scientists builds upon everyday commonsense, but, in addition, employs a "postulate of rationality." Scientific reasoning imposes special requirements on their claims and conclusions (e.g., application of rules of formal logic, standards of conceptual clarity, compatibility with established scientific 'facts'). This has two important implications for research in the social sciences. First, it is inappropriate for sociologists to use scientific reasoning as a lens for viewing human action in daily life, as Parsons had proposed, since they are distinct kinds of rationality. On the other hand, the traditionally assumed discontinuity between the claims of science and commonsense understandings is dissolved since scientific observations employ both forms of rationality. This raises a flag for researchers in the social sciences, since these disciplines are fundamentally engaged in the study of the shared understandings that underlie the day-to-day functioning of society. How can we make detached, objective claims about everyday reasoning, if our conceptual apparatus is hopelessly contaminated with commonsense categories and rationalities?

=== Ethnomethodology ===
Garfinkel's concept of ethnomethodology started with his attempt at analyzing a jury discussion after a Chicago case in 1945. Garfinkel was attempting to understand the way jurors knew how to act as jurors. After attempting to understand the jurors' actions, Garfinkel created the term "ethnomethodology" as a way to describe how people use different methods in order to understand the society they live in. Garfinkel noticed through his study of ethnomethodology that the methods people use to understand the society they live in are very much fixed in people's natural attitudes. His main idea was that when thinking through a sociological lens, sociologists would be only thinking about outside sources (social facts) to explain a situation when trying to explain what is happening within it. Garfinkel uses this point to emphasize how different ethnomethodology is from sociology and Durkheim's thinking. In sociology, it is more common to use outside sources such as institutions to describe a situation, rather than the individual.

=== Rationality ===
Accepting Schütz's critique of the Parsonian program, Garfinkel sought to find another way of addressing the Problem of Social Order. Social order arises in the very ways that participants conduct themselves together. The sense of a situation arises from their interactions. Garfinkel writes, "any social setting [can] be viewed as self-organizing with respect to the intelligible character of its own appearances as either representations of or as evidences-of-a-social-order." The orderliness of social life, therefore, is produced through the moment-to-moment work of society's members and ethnomethodology's task is to explicate just how this work is done. He wrote, "Members to an organized arrangement are continually engaged in having to decide, recognize, persuade, or make evident the rational, i.e., the coherent, or consistent, or chosen, or planful, or effective, or methodical, or knowledgeable character of [their activities]". On first inspection, this might not seem very different from Parsons' proposal; however their views on rationality are not compatible. For Garfinkel, society's character is not dictated by an imposed standard of rationality, either scientific or otherwise.

To Garfinkel, rationality is itself produced as a local accomplishment in, and as, the very ways that society's members craft their moment-to-moment interaction. He writes:

Instead of the properties of rationality being treated as a methodological principle for interpreting activity, they are to be treated only as empirically problematical material. They would have the status of data and would have to be accounted for in the same way that the more familiar properties of conduct are accounted for.

In his chapter, "The Rational Properties of Scientific and Common Sense Activities" in his book, Studies in Ethnomethodology, 1967, Garfinkel discusses how there are various meanings of the term "rationality" in relation to the way people behave. Garfinkel mentions Schütz's paper on the issues of rationality and his various meanings of the term. Garfinkel discusses each of these "rationalities" and the "behaviors" that result, which are:

1. Categorizing and Comparing: "Sometimes rationality refers to the fact that he searches the two situations with regard to their comparability, and sometimes to his concern for making matters comparable"
2. Tolerable error: "It is possible for a person to 'require' varying degrees of 'goodness of fit' between an observation and theory in terms of which he names, measures, describes, or otherwise intends the sense of his observation as a datum"
3. Search for "means": "Rationality is sometimes used to mean that a person reviews rules of procedure which in the past yielded the practical effects now desired"
4. Analysis of alternatives and consequences: "Frequently the term rationality is used to call attention to the fact that a person in assessing a situation anticipates the alterations which his actions will produce"
5. Strategy: "Prior to the actual occasion of choice a person may assign to a set of alternative courses of action the conditions under which any one of them is to be followed"
6. Concern for timing: "the concern for timing involves the extent to which he takes a position with regard to the possible ways in which events can temporally occur"
7. Predictability: "He may seek preliminary information about it in order to establish some empirical constants or he may attempt to make the situation predictable by examining the logical properties of the constructs he uses in 'defining' it ..."
8. Rules of procedure: "Sometimes rationality refers to rules of procedure and inference in terms of which a person decides the correctness of his judgments, inferences, perceptions, and characterizations"
9. Choice: "Sometimes the fact that a person is aware of the actual possibility of exercising a choice and sometimes the fact that he chooses are popular meanings of rationality"
10. Grounds of choice: "The grounds upon which a person exercises a choice among alternatives as well as the grounds he uses to legitimize a choice are frequently pointed out as rational features of an action"
11. Compatibility of ends-means relationships with principles of formal logic: "A person may treat a contemplated course of action as an arrangement of steps in the solution of a problem"
12. Semantic clarity and distinctness: "Reference is often made to a person's attempt to treat the semantic clarity of a construction as a variable with a maximum value which must be approximated as a required step in solving the problem of constructing a credible definition of a situation"
13. Clarity and distinctness "for its own sake": "Schütz points out that a concern for clarity and distinctness may be a concern for distinctness that is adequate for the person's purposes."
14. Compatibility of the definition of a situation with scientific knowledge: "A person can allow what he treats as 'matters of fact' to be criticized in terms of their compatibility with the body of scientific findings"

Garfinkel notes that often, rationality refers to "the person's feelings that accompany his conduct, e.g. "affective neutrality," "unemotional," "detached," "disinterested," and "impersonal." For the theoretical tasks of this paper, however, the fact that a person may attend his environment with such feelings is uninteresting. It is of interest, however, that a person uses his feelings about his environment to recommend the sensible character of the thing he is talking about or the warrant of a finding."

=== Reflexivity ===
Reflexivity means that members shape action or want relation to context while the context itself is constantly being redefined through action. Garfinkel regarded indexical expressions as key phenomena. Words like here, now, and me shift their meaning depending on when and where they are used. Philosophers and linguists refer to such terms as indexicals because they point into (index) the situational context in which they are produced. One of Garfinkel's contributions was to note that such expressions go beyond "here", "now," etc. and encompass any and all utterances that members of society produce. As Garfinkel specified, "The demonstrably rational properties of indexical expressions and indexical actions [are] an ongoing achievement of the organized activities of everyday life". The pervasiveness of indexical expressions and their member-ordered properties means that all forms of action provide for their own understandability through the methods by which they are produced. That is, action has the property of reflexivity whereby such action is made meaningful in the light of the very situation within which it is produced.

The contextual setting, however, should not be seen as a passive backdrop for the action. The initial insight into the importance of reflexivity occurred during the study of juror's deliberations, wherein what jurors had decided was used by them to reflexively organize the plausibility of what they were deciding. Other investigations revealed that parties did not always know what they meant by their own formulations; rather, verbal formulations of the local order of an event were used to collect the very meanings that gave them their coherent sense. Garfinkel declared that the issue of how practical actions are tied to their context lies at the heart of ethnomethodological inquiry. Using professional coffee tasting as an illustration here, taste descriptors do not merely describe but also direct the tasting of a cup of coffee; hence, a descriptor is not merely the causal result of what is tasted, as in:

coffee ⇒ taste descriptor

Nor is it an imperialism of a methodology:

taste descriptor ⇒ coffee

Rather, the description and what it describes are mutually determinative:

taste descriptor ⇔ coffee

The descriptors operate reflexively by finding in the coffee what they mean, and each is used to make the other more explicit. Much the same may be said about rules-in-games or the use of accounts in ordinary action. This reflexivity of accounts is ubiquitous, and its sense has nearly nothing to do with how the term "reflexivity" is used in analytic philosophy, in "reflexive ethnographies" that endeavor to expose the influence of the researcher in organizing the ethnography, or the way many social scientists use "reflexivity" as a synonym for "self-reflection." For ethnomethodology reflexivity is an actual, unavoidable feature of everyone's daily life.

=== Service lines ===
Garfinkel has frequently illustrated ethnomethodological analysis by means of the illustration of service lines. Everyone knows what it is like to stand in a line. Queues are a part of our everyday social life; they are something within which we all participate as we carry out our everyday affairs. We recognize when someone is waiting in a line and, when we are "doing" being a member of a line, we have ways of showing it. In other words, lines may seem impromptu and routine, but they exhibit an internal, member-produced embodied structure. A line is "witnessably a produced social object;" it is, in Durkheimian terms, a "social fact." Participants' actions as "seeably" what they are (such as occupying a position in a queue) depend upon practices that the participant engages in relation to others' practices in the proximate vicinity. To recognize someone as in a line, or to be seen as "in line" ourselves requires attention to bodily movement and bodily placement in relation to others and to the physical environment that those movements also constitute. This is another sense that we consider the action to be indexical—it is made meaningful in the ways in which it is tied to the situation and the practices of members who produce it. The ethnomethodologist's task becomes one of analyzing how members' ongoing conduct is a constituent aspect of this or that course of action. Such analysis can be applied to any sort of social matter (e.g., being female, following instructions, performing a proof, participating in a conversation). These topics are representative of the kinds of inquiry that ethnomethodology was intended to undertake. In particular, Garfinkel conducted a famous case study on Agnes, a transgender woman in 1967, to whom he expressed consistent sexual attraction (pp. 136, 144, 148). "Garfinkel view[ed] sexuality as a practical and ongoing accomplishment of members through their practical activities" and focused on how "Agnes 'passed' as a normal female despite the continuous risk that she would be revealed as a transsexual."

=== Breaching experiments ===
According to George Ritzer, a sociologist, breaching experiments are experiments where "social reality is violated in order to shed light on the methods by which people construct social reality." In Garfinkel's work, he encouraged his students to attempt breaching experiments in order to provide examples of basic ethnomethodology. According to Garfinkel, these experiments are important because they help us understand "'the socially standardized and standardizing, "seen but unnoticed," expected, background features of everyday scenes.'" He highlights many of these experiments in his books.

The following is an example of one of Garfinkel's breaching experiments from his book, Studies in Ethnomethodology.

Case 3: On Friday night my husband and I were watching television. My husband remarked that he was tired. I asked, 'How are you tired? Physically, mentally, or just bored?'

S: I don't know, I guess physically, mainly.

E: You mean that your muscles ache or your bones?

S: I guess so. Don't be so technical. (After more watching)

S: All these old movies have the same kind of old iron bedstead in them.

E: What do you mean? Do you mean all old movies, or some of them, or just the ones you have seen?

S: What's the matter with you? You know what I mean.

E: I wish you would be more specific.

S: You know what I mean! Drop dead!

Today, some textbooks in sociology often suggest that breaching experiments are the research method that ethnomethodologists use to explore the social organization of action. However, for Garfinkel breaching experiments mostly are a teaching tool that he describes as "tutorial exercises in Ethnomethodology's Program.

== Influence on later research ==
A substantial corpus of empirical work has developed exploring the issues raised by Garfinkel's writings.

Directly inspired by Garfinkel, Harvey Sacks undertook to investigate the sequential organization of conversational interaction. This program, pioneered with colleagues Gail Jefferson and Emanuel Schegloff, has produced a large and flourishing research literature. A second, smaller literature has grown out of another of Sacks' interests having to do with social categorization practices.

Sociologist Emanuel A. Schegloff used the concept of ethnomethodology to study telephone conversations and how they influence social interaction. Gail Jefferson used ethnomethodology to study laughter and how people know when it is appropriate to laugh in conversation. John Heritage and David Greatbach studied rhetoric of political speeches and their relation to the amount of applause the speaker receives, whereas Steven Clayman studied how booing in an audience is generated. Philip Manning and George Ray studied shyness in an ethnomethodological way. Ethnomethodologists such as Graham Button, R. J. Anderson, John Hughes, Wes Sharrock, Angela Garcia, Jack Whalen, and D. H. Zimmerman all study ethnomethodology within institutions.

Early on, Garfinkel issued a call for ethnomethodologically informed investigations into the nature of work. This led to a wide variety of studies focusing on different occupations and professions, including laboratory science, law, police work, medicine, jazz improvisation, education, mathematics, philosophy, and others.

Garfinkel's program strongly resonates in a wide range of disciplines, including sociology, linguistics, gender studies, organization studies and management as well as in the technical sciences. In the technical sciences, ethnomethodology's influence can probably be ascribed to Lucy Suchman's analysis of learning to use a copy machine. It came to serve as an important critique of theories of planning in Artificial Intelligence.

== Selected publications ==
The bulk of Garfinkel's original writings came in the form of scholarly articles and technical reports, most of which were subsequently republished as book chapters. To appreciate the sequential development of Garfinkel's thought, however, it is important to understand when these pieces were actually written. Although published in 2006, Seeing Sociologically was actually written as an annotated version of a draft dissertation proposal two years after arriving at Harvard. Toward a Sociological Theory of Information was also written while Garfinkel was a student and was based on a 1952 report prepared in conjunction with the Organizational Behavior Project at Princeton. Some of Garfinkel's early papers on ethnomethodology were republished as Studies in Ethnomethodology. This publication is well known by many sociologists. Garfinkel subsequently published an edited anthology showcasing selected examples of ethnomethodologically informed work. Later still, a mix of previously published papers and some new writing was released as Ethnomethodology's Program: Working Out Durkheim's Aphorism. This latter collection, in conjunction with the Studies, represent the definitive exposition of the ethnomethodological approach. Garfinkel had planned to publish a companion piece to Ethnomethodology's Program, which was tentatively entitled, "Workplace and Documentary Diversity of Ethnomethodological Studies of Work and Sciences by Ethnomethodology's Authors: What did we do? What did we learn?". This project was never completed, but some preliminary notes were published in Human Studies.
