= Robert E. Longacre =

American linguist (1922–2014)

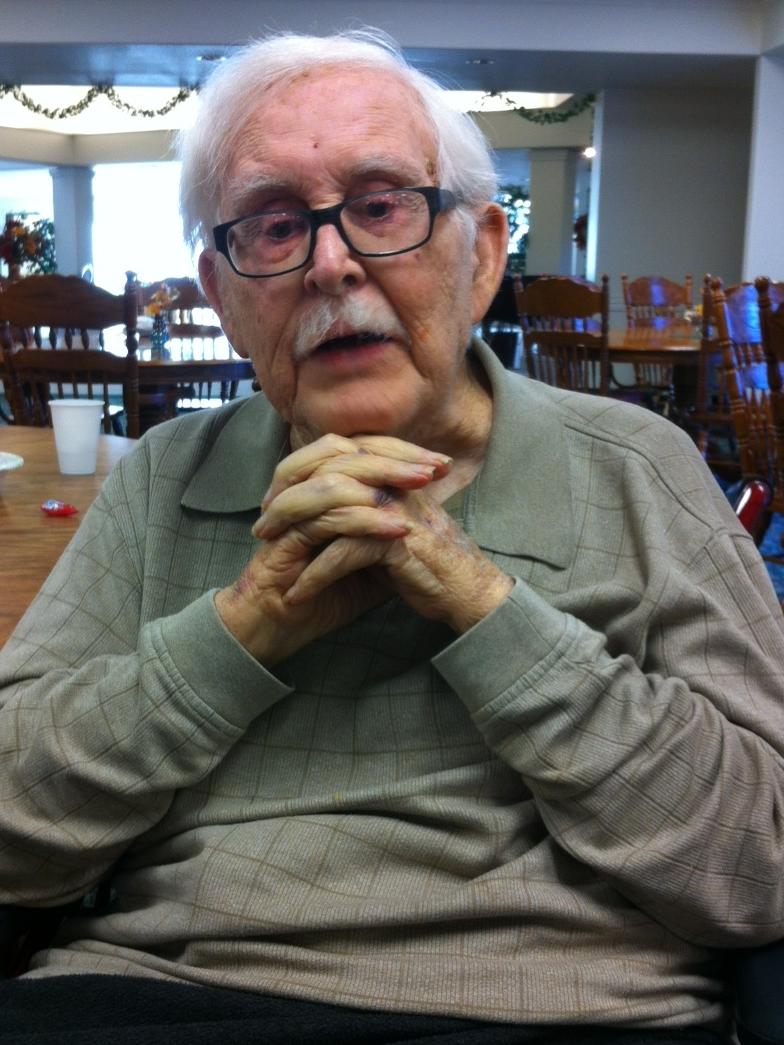
- Longacre in 2013
- Born: August 13, 1922; Akron, Ohio
- Died: April 20, 2014 (aged 91); California
- Education: University of Pennsylvania
- Known for: Discourse analysis
- Scientific career
- Fields: Linguistics
- Doctoral advisor: Zellig Harris and Henry Hoenigswald

Robert E. Longacre (August 13, 1922–April 20, 2014) was an American linguist and missionary who worked on the Triqui language and a text-based theory and method of discourse analysis. He is well known for his seminal studies of discourse structure (text linguistics), but he also made significant contributions in other linguistic areas, especially the historical linguistics of Mixtec, Trique, and other related languages. His PhD was at the University of Pennsylvania under Zellig Harris and Henry Hoenigswald. His 1955 dissertation on Proto-Mixtecan was the first extensive linguistic reconstruction in Mesoamerican languages. This was one of several SIL studies which helped to establish the Oto-Manguean language family as being comparable in time depth to Proto-Indo-European. His research on Trique was the first documented case of a language with five distinct levels of tone.

He was Professor Emeritus at the University of Texas at Arlington, where he taught Linguistics for over 20 years (1972-1993), mostly on topics related to his approach to discourse analysis. In 1994-1995, he served as President of the Linguistic Association of Canada and the United States (LACUS) and was honored by LACUS in 2007.

He continued working until his death. His last book, Understanding Biblical Hebrew Verb Forms: Distribution and Function across Genres, co-written with Andrew C. Bowling, was published posthumously in 2015.

Born in Akron, Ohio, he attended Houghton College in upper New York State where he met his wife, Gwen. After graduating in 1943 they married in 1946 and went to Mexico in 1947 where they lived with the Trique peoples in the mountains of Oaxaca State.

== Education ==
- 1943 – BA, Religious Education, Houghton College
- 1946 – BD, Faith Theological Seminary
- 1952 – MA, Linguistics, University of Pennsylvania
- 1955 – PhD, Linguistics, University of Pennsylvania

== Major publications ==
- 1952. Five phonemic pitch levels in Trique. Acta Linguistica 7 (1-2): 62-82.
- 1957. Proto-Mixtecan. International Journal of American Linguistics 23(4), Part 3:1-195.
- 1960 (with Mak, Cornelia). Proto-Mixtec phonology. International Journal of American Linguistics 26.1: 23-40.
- 1964. Progress in Otomanguean reconstruction. Janua Linguarum, Proceedings of the Ninth International Congress of Linguists, Horace G. Lunt (ed.), pp. 1016–1025.
- 1964. Grammar discovery procedures: a field manual. Janua Linguarum, series minor, Academic Training.
- 1965 (with Upson, B. W.). Proto-Chatino phonology. International Journal of American Linguistics 31.4: 312-22.
- 1968. Discourse, paragraph and sentence structure in selected Philippine languages. Dallas: SIL International.
- 1970. Paragraph and sentence structure in New Guinea Highlands languages. Kivung (now Language and Linguistics in Melanesia), pp. 150–163.
- 1975. The tone system of Proto-Mixtecan. Bibliotheca Phonetica, Studies in tone and intonation by members of the Summer Institute of Linguistics, Ruth M. Brend (ed.) pages 152-154.
- 1976. (with Frances M. Woods, editor), Discourse grammar: Studies in indigenous languages of Colombia, Panama, and Ecuador 1, Dallas: SIL International.
- 1976. 'Mystery' particles and affixes. Papers from the Twelfth Regional Meeting Chicago Linguistic Society. Salikoko S. Mufwene, Carol A. Walker and Sanford B. Steever (eds.) pages 468-77.
- 1976. An anatomy of speech notions. Peter de Ridder Publications in Tagmemics.
- 1977 (with Frances M. Woods, editor). Discourse grammar: Studies in Indigenous Languages of Colombia, Panama, and Ecuador 2. Dallas: SIL International.
- 1979. Why we need a vertical revolution in linguistics. The Fifth LACUS Forum 1978, Wolfgang Wölck and Paul Garvin (eds.), pp. 247–70.
- 1979. The discourse structure of the flood narrative. Journal of the American Academy of Religion XLVII (1) Supplement, pp. 89–133.
- 1983. Spectrum, profile and constituency structure in text analysis. In Shiró̱ Hattori and Kazuko Inoue (eds.), Proceedings of the 13th International Congress of Linguists, Tokyo. pp. 1024–27.
- 1990. Storyline concerns and word order typology in East and West Africa. Studies in African Linguistics. Monograph Supplement 10, 181 pages.
- 1996. The Grammar of Discourse, 2nd edition, Springer.
- 2003. Joseph: A Story of Divine Providence: A Text Theoretical and Textlinguistic Analysis of Genesis 37 and 39-48, 2nd ed. Eisenbrauns.
- 2012 (with Shin Ja J. Hwang). Holistic Discourse Analysis, Second Edition, Dallas: SIL International.
- 2015 (with Andrew Bowling). Understanding Biblical Hebrew Verb Forms: Distribution and Function across Genres. Dallas: SIL International.

== See also ==
- Wycliffe Bible Translators
- SIL
