= Discourse analysis =

Analysis of social and lingual policy, or historiographical discourse phenomena

Discourse analysis (DA), or discourse studies, is a collection of approaches to the analysis or study of any written, spoken, or sign communication discourse including any semiotic event.

The objects of discourse analysis (discourse, writing, conversation, communicative event) are variously defined in terms of coherent sequences of sentences, propositions, speech, or turns-at-talk. Contrary to much of traditional linguistics, discourse analysts not only study language use 'beyond the sentence boundary' but also prefer to analyze 'naturally occurring' language use, not invented examples. Text linguistics is a closely related field. The essential difference between discourse analysis and text linguistics is that discourse analysis aims at sociological or psychological insights rather than text structure for its own sake. Some approaches use discourse as a guide to common psychological characteristics, such as personality traits while others in discursive psychology seek explanations more grounded in discourse itself.

Discourse analysis has been taken up in a variety of disciplines in the humanities and social sciences, including linguistics, education, economics sociology, anthropology, social work, cognitive psychology, social psychology, area studies, cultural studies, international relations, human geography, environmental studies, communication studies, biblical studies, public relations, argumentation studies, and translation studies. This disciplinary variety may be related to great variety in discourse studies of assumptions, dimensions of analysis, and methodologies.

== History ==
=== Early use of the term ===
There is ongoing discussion about whether Austria-born Leo Spitzer's Stilstudien (Style Studies) of 1928 is the earliest example of discourse analysis (DA). Michel Foucault translated it into French. However, the term first came into general use following the publication of a series of papers by Zellig Harris from 1952 reporting on work from which he developed transformational grammar in the late 1930s. Formally equivalent relations among the sentences of a coherent discourse are made explicit by using sentence transformations to put the text in a canonical form. Words and sentences with equivalent information then appear in the same column of an array.

This work progressed over the next four decades (see references) into a science of sublanguage analysis (Kittredge & Lehrberger 1982), culminating in a demonstration of the informational structures in texts of a sublanguage of science, that of immunology (Harris et al. 1989), and a fully articulated theory of linguistic informational content (Harris 1991). During this time, however, most linguists ignored such developments in favor of a succession of elaborate theories of sentence-level syntax and semantics.

In January 1953, a linguist working for the American Bible Society, James A. Lauriault (alt. Loriot), needed to find answers to some fundamental errors in translating Quechua, in the Cuzco area of Peru. Following Harris's 1952 publications, he worked over the meaning and placement of each word in a collection of Quechua legends with a native speaker of Quechua and was able to formulate discourse rules that transcended the simple sentence structure. He then applied the process to Shipibo, another language of Eastern Peru. He taught the theory at the Summer Institute of Linguistics in Norman, Oklahoma, in the summers of 1956 and 1957 and entered the University of Pennsylvania to study with Harris in the interim year. He tried to publish a paper,Shipibo Paragraph Structure, but it was delayed until 1970 (Loriot & Hollenbach 1970). In the meantime, Kenneth Lee Pike, a professor at the University of Michigan, taught the theory, and one of his students, Robert E. Longacre, developed it in his writings. Harris's methodology disclosing the correlation of form with meaning was developed into a system for the computer-aided analysis of natural language by a team led by Naomi Sager at NYU, which has been applied to a number of sublanguage domains, most notably to medical informatics.

=== In the humanities ===
In the late 1960s and 1970s, and without reference to this prior work, a variety of other approaches to a new cross-discipline of DA began to develop in most of the humanities and social sciences concurrently with, and related to, other disciplines. These include semiotics, psycholinguistics, sociolinguistics, and pragmatics. Many of these approaches, especially those influenced by the social sciences, favor a more dynamic study of oral talk-in-interaction. An example is "conversational analysis" (CA), which was influenced by the sociologist Harold Garfinkel, the founder of ethnomethodology.

== Perspectives ==
The following are some of the specific theoretical perspectives and analytical approaches used in linguistic discourse analysis:

- Applied linguistics, an interdisciplinary perspective on linguistic analysis
- Cognitive neuroscience of discourse comprehension
- Cognitive psychology, studying the production and comprehension of discourse
- Conversation analysis
- Critical discourse analysis
- Discursive psychology
- Emergent grammar
- Ethnography of communication
- Functional grammar
- Interactional sociolinguistics
- Mediated stylistics
- Pragmatics
- Response based therapy (counselling)
- Rhetoric
- Stylistics (linguistics)
- Sublanguage analysis
- Tagmemics
- Text linguistics
- Variation analysis

Although these approaches emphasize different aspects of language use, they all view language as social interaction and are concerned with the social contexts in which discourse is embedded.

Often a distinction is made between 'local' structures of discourse (such as relations among sentences, propositions, and turns) and 'global' structures, such as overall topics and the schematic organization of discourses and conversations. For instance, many types of discourse begin with some kind of global 'summary', in titles, headlines, leads, abstracts, and so on.

== Topics of interest ==
Topics of discourse analysis include:

- The various levels or dimensions of discourse, such as sounds (intonation, etc.), gestures, syntax, the lexicon, style, rhetoric, meanings, speech acts, moves, strategies, turns, and other aspects of interaction
- Genres of discourse (various types of discourse in politics, the media, education, science, business, etc.)
- The relations between discourse and the emergence of syntactic structure
- The relations between text (discourse) and context
- The relations between discourse and power
- The relations between discourse and interaction
- The relations between discourse and cognition and memory
- Lexical density
- Ecocultural discourse studies consider human relationships with their wider ecologies. As Milstein writes, “discourses not only serve to structure, oppress, and transform human lives, but so, too, do discourses serve to symbolically and materially construct, constrain, and change the more than human world”.

=== Political discourse ===
Political discourse is the text and talk of professional politicians or political institutions, such as presidents and prime ministers and other members of government, parliament or political parties, both at the local, national and international levels, includes both the speaker and the audience.

Political discourse analysis is a field of discourse analysis which focuses on discourse in political forums (such as debates, speeches, and hearings) as the phenomenon of interest. Policy analysis requires discourse analysis to be effective from the post-positivist perspective.

Political discourse is the formal exchange of reasoned views as to which of several alternative courses of action should be taken to solve a societal problem.

=== Corporate discourse ===
Corporate discourse can be broadly defined as the language used by corporations. It encompasses a set of messages that a corporation sends out to the world (the general public, the customers and other corporations) and the messages it uses to communicate within its own structures (the employees and other stakeholders).

== See also ==
- Actor (policy debate)
- Critical discourse analysis
- Dialogical analysis
- Discourse representation theory
- Frame analysis
- Communicative action
- Essex School of discourse analysis
- Ethnolinguistics
- Foucauldian discourse analysis
- Interpersonal communication
- Linguistic anthropology
- Narrative analysis
- Pragmatics
- Rhetoric
- Sociolinguistics
- Statement analysis
- Stylistics (linguistics)
- Worldview
