= James McElvenny =

Australian linguist and historian

- Born: Sydney, New South Wales, Australia

James McElvenny is an Australian linguist and intellectual historian based in Germany, known for his work on the history of modern linguistics in the nineteenth and twentieth centuries. He has directed research into the theoretical underpinnings of formal linguistics, and has published extensively on the history of typology and language documentation, in particular as it relates to the tradition of linguistic scholarship established by Wilhelm von Humboldt. In this connection, he has worked extensively on Georg von der Gabelentz. He has also published on early twentieth-century language study in Britain and its connections to philosophy of language in analytic philosophy, with a particular focus on C. K. Ogden and his milieu.

He is editor of the book series History and Philosophy of the Language Sciences at Language Science Press, and the presenter of the monthly podcast of the same name.

== Career ==
James McElvenny is a researcher at the University of Siegen in Germany. He has previously been a Newton International Fellow at the University of Edinburgh in Scotland, and an Alexander von Humboldt Fellow at the University of Potsdam in Germany.

== Selected works ==
- 2025. Entstehung und Entwicklung der modernen Linguistik. De Gruyter.
- 2024. A History of Modern Linguistics: From the Beginnings to World War II. Edinburgh University Press.
- 2023. Limits of Structuralism. Oxford University Press. (Edited volume)
- 2019. Form and Formalism in Linguistics. Language Science Press. (Edited volume)
- 2018. Language and Meaning in the Age of Modernism: C. K. Ogden and his contemporaries. Edinburgh University Press.
