= Marjorie Harness Goodwin =

American anthropologist

Marjorie Harness Goodwin is an American anthropologist, currently Distinguished Professor at University of California, Los Angeles, and also a published author of books.

== Education ==
She received her PhD from the University of Pennsylvania and her honorary PhD from Uppsala University.
