= Harvey Sacks =

American sociologist

- Born: July 19, 1935
- Died: November 14, 1975 (aged 40)
- Occupations: Sociologist, anthropologist
- Known for: Founder of conversation analysis

Harvey Sacks (July 19, 1935 – November 14, 1975) was an American sociologist influenced by the ethnomethodology tradition. He pioneered extremely detailed studies of the way people use language in everyday life. Despite his early death in a car crash and the fact that he did not publish widely, he is recognized as the founder of conversation analysis. His work has had significant influence on fields such as linguistics, discourse analysis, and discursive psychology.

== Life and academic career ==
Sacks received his doctoral degree in sociology at the University of California, Berkeley (1966), an LL.B. at Yale Law School (1959), and a B.A. at Columbia College (1955). He lectured at the University of California, Los Angeles and Irvine from 1964 to 1975.

In 1975 Sacks died in a car accident. He was survived by his wife, two siblings, and his parents.

== Work ==
Sacks became interested in the structure of conversation while working at a suicide counseling hotline in Los Angeles in the 1960s. The calls to the hotline were recorded, and Sacks was able to gain access to the tapes and study them. In the 1960s, prominent linguists like Noam Chomsky believed that conversation was too disorganized to be worthy of any kind of in-depth structural analysis. Sacks strongly disagreed, since he saw structure in every conversation, and developed conversation analysis as a result.

Sacks's recorded lectures were transcribed (by Gail Jefferson who also edited them posthumously) but the tapes were not saved. The duplicated copies of the transcribed lectures were made freely available by Sacks and achieved international circulation and recognition during his lifetime and subsequently .

He treated such topics as: the organization of person-reference; topic organization and stories in conversation; speaker selection preferences; pre-sequences; the organization of turn-taking; conversational openings and closings; and puns, jokes, stories and repairs in conversation among many others.

== Legacy ==
Emanuel Schegloff, one of Sacks's close collaborators, colleagues and co-authors, became his literary executor.

Sacks's major work, Lectures on Conversation, is composed of edited revisions of transcribed lectures held from Spring 1964 through to 1972, and comprises about 1200 pages in a two-volume work published by Basil Blackwel in 1992. This publication project was instigated largely by David Sudnow and Gail Jefferson, colleagues and students of Sacks at Berkeley, UCLA and Irvine, and includes an introduction by Emanuel Schegloff. In her acknowledgements in these volumes, Jefferson mentioned the help of Sudnow in dealing with Sacks's literary estate. The Harvey Sacks Memorial Association, registered as a not-for-profit Association, was formed by Sudnow.

These Lectures have been important for Sacks's later influence and for the field of Conversation Analysis.

Sudnow was a follower of Alfred Schutz in phenomenology, and Harold Garfinkel in ethnomethodology. Sudnow regards the work of Sacks as outside the ethnomethodological mainstream. By contrast Garfinkel lists Sacks as one of 'Ethnomethodology's Authors'

== Works ==
- Sacks, H. (1963) "Sociological Description," in Berkeley Journal of Sociology, 8:1–16.
- Sacks, H. (1967) "The Search for Help. No One To Turn To," In E.S. Schneidman (ed) Essays in Self Destruction, New York, NY: Science House, pp. 203–223.
- Sacks, H. and Garfinkel, H. (1970) "On formal structures of practical action," in J.C. McKinney and E.A. Tiryakian (eds.), Theoretical Sociology, Appleton-Century-Crofts, New York, 1970, pp. 338–366. Reprinted in H. Garfinkel, ed., (1986) Ethnomethodological Studies of Work, 160–193.
- Sacks, H. (1972) "An Initial Investigation of the Usability of Conversational Data for Doing Sociology," in D. Sudnow (ed.) Studies in Social Interaction, Free Press, New York, pp. 31–74.
- Sacks, H. (1972) "Notes on Police Assessment of Moral Character," in D.N. Sudnow (ed.) Studies in Social Interaction, Free Press, New York, NY, pp. 280–293.
- Sacks, H. (1973/1987). On the preferences for agreement and contiguity in sequences in conversation. In G. Button & J. R. Lee (Eds.), Talk and social organisation (pp. 54 – 69). Clevedon, UK: Multilingual Matters.
- Sacks, H. (1974) "On the Analyzability of Stories by Children," in R. Turner (ed.) Ethnomethodology, Penguin, Harmondsworth, pp. 216–232.
- Sacks, H. (1974) "An Analysis of the Course of a Joke's telling in Conversation," in R. Bauman and J.F. Sherzer (eds.) Explorations in the Ethnography of Speaking. Cambridge, UK; Cambridge University Press, pp. 337–353.
- Sacks, H., Schegloff, E. A. & Jefferson, G. (1974) "A Simplest Systematics for the Organisation of Turn-Taking for Conversation," in Language, 50:696–735.
- Sacks, H. (1975) "Everyone Has To Lie," in B. Blount and M. Sanches (eds.) Sociocultural Dimensions of Language Use, Academic Press, New York, NY, pp. 57–80.
- Sacks, H. (1978) "Some Technical Considerations of a Dirty Joke," in J. Schenkein (ed.) Studies in the Organization of Conversational Interaction, Academic Press, New York, NY, pp. 249–269.
- Sacks, H. (1979) "Hotrodder: A Revolutionary Category," in G. Psathas (ed.) Everyday Language: Studies in Ethnomethodology. Irvington Press, New York, NY, pp. 7–14.
- Sacks, H. and E.A. Schegloff. (1979) "Two Preferences in the Organization of Reference to Persons in Conversation and Their Interaction," in G. Psathas (ed.) Everyday Language: Studies in Ethnomethodology, Irvington Press, New York, NY, pp. 15–21.
- Sacks, H. (1989) "Lectures 1964-1965," in Gail Jefferson (ed.) with an Introduction/Memoir by E.A. Schegloff, Human Studies, 12: 211–393.
- Sacks, H. (1992). Lectures on Conversation, Volumes I and II. Edited by G. Jefferson with Introduction by E.A. Schegloff, Blackwell, Oxford. ISBN 1-55786-705-4
