= Conversation analysis =

Approach to the study of social interaction

Conversation analysis (CA) is an approach to the study of social interaction that investigates the methods members use to achieve mutual understanding through the transcription of naturally occurring conversations from audio or video. It focuses on both verbal and non-verbal conduct, especially in situations of everyday life. CA originated as a sociological method, but has since spread to other fields. CA began with a focus on casual conversation, but its methods were subsequently adapted to embrace more task- and institution-centered interactions, such as those occurring in doctors' offices, courts, law enforcement, helplines, educational settings, and the mass media, and to focus on multimodal and nonverbal activity in interaction, including gaze, body movement and gesture. As a consequence, the term conversation analysis has become something of a misnomer, but it has continued as a term for a distinctive and successful approach to the analysis of interactions. CA and ethnomethodology are sometimes considered one field and referred to as EMCA.

Conversation analysis should not be confused with other methods of analyzing conversation or interaction, such as other areas of pragmatics and discourse analysis.

== History ==
Conversation analysis was developed in the late 1960s and early 1970s principally by the sociologist Harvey Sacks and his close associates Emanuel Schegloff and Gail Jefferson. Sacks was inspired by Harold Garfinkel's ethnomethodology and Erving Goffman's conception of what came to be known as the interaction order, but also a number of minor sources of contemporary influences such as the generativism of Noam Chomsky and its focus on building an apparatus. The speech act theory of John Searle was a parallel development rather than influencing or being influenced by CA. Today CA is an established method used in sociology, anthropology, linguistics, speech-communication and psychology, and works alongside related approaches such as interactional sociolinguistics, interactional linguistics, discourse analysis and discursive psychology.

== Method ==
Conversation analysts typically start by gathering audio or video recordings of real life encounters, which they transcribe using a detailed system pioneered by Gail Jefferson. Generalizations are built up through close examination and interpretation of specific encounters with an eye towards trying to uncover the methods the members are using, often from different interactions with different people, but some studies also focus on a single-case analysis. Crucially, the method uses the fact that interaction consists of multiple participants and that they make sense of each other, so the method proceeds by considering e.g. how one turn by a specific participant displays an understanding of the previous turn by another participant (or other earlier interaction). This is commonly referred to as the next-turn proof procedure even though proof is not to be taken literally. Research questions revolve around participants' orientation, that is, what features (linguistic or other) that cues people to respond in certain ways and influence the trajectory of an interaction. A key part of the method are deviant cases in collections, as they show that when a participant does not follow a norm, the interaction is affected in a way that reveals the existence of the norm in focus. Sacks spoke of 'noticeable absences' in his lectures.

The data used in CA is in the form of video- or audio-recorded conversations, collected with or without researchers' involvement, typically from a video camera or other recording device in the space where the conversation takes place (e.g. a living room, picnic, or doctor's office). The researchers construct detailed transcriptions from the recordings, containing as much detail as is possible.

The transcription often contains additional information about nonverbal communication and the way people say things. Jeffersonian transcription is a commonly used method of transcription and nonverbal details are often transcribed according to Mondadan conventions by Lorenza Mondada.

After transcription, the researchers perform inductive data-driven analysis aiming to find recurring patterns of interaction. Based on the analysis, the researchers identify regularities, rules or models to describe these patterns, enhancing, modifying or replacing initial hypotheses. While this kind of inductive analysis based on collections of data exhibits is basic to fundamental work in CA, it has been more common in recent years to also use statistical analysis in applications of CA to solve problems in medicine and elsewhere.

While conversation analysis provides a method of analysing conversation, this method is informed by an underlying theory of what features of conversation are meaningful and the meanings that are likely implied by these features. Additionally there is a body of theory about how to interpret conversation.

== Basic structures ==
Conversation analysis provides a model that can be used to understand interactions, and it offers a number of concepts to describe them. The following section contains important concepts and phenomena identified in the conversation analytical literature, and it will refer to articles that are centrally concerned with the phenomenon. A conversation is viewed as a collection of turns of speaking; errors or misunderstandings in speech are addressed with repairs, and turns may be marked by the delay between them or other linguistic features.

=== Turn-taking organization ===
The analysis of turn-taking started with the description in a model in the paper known as the Simplest Systematics, which was very programmatic for the field of Conversation analysis and one of the most cited papers published in the journal Language.

The model is designed to explain that when people talk in conversation, they do not always talk all at the same time, but generally, one person speaks at a time, and then another person can follow. Such a contribution to a conversation by one speaker is then a turn. A turn is created through certain forms or units that listeners can recognize and count on, called turn construction units (TCUs), and speakers and listeners will know that such forms can be a word or a clause and use that knowledge to predict when a speaker is finished so that others can speak, to avoid or minimize both overlap and silence. A listener will look for the places where they can start speaking – so-called transition relevant places (TRPs) – based on how the units appear over time. Turn construction units can be created or recognized via four methods, i.e. types of unit design:

- Grammatical methods, i.e. morphosyntactic structures.
- Prosodic methods, e.g. pitch, speed and changes in pronunciation.
- Pragmatic methods: turns perform actions, and at the point where listeners have heard enough and know enough, a turn can be pragmatically complete.
- Visual methods: gesture, gaze and body movement is also used to indicate that a turn is over. For example, a person speaking looks at the next speaker when their turn is about to end.

Each time a turn is over, speakers also have to decide who can talk next, and this is called turn allocation. The rules for turn allocation are commonly formulated in the same way as in the original Simplest Systematics paper, with 2 parts, whereby the first consists of 3 elements:

  - a. If the current speaker selects a next one to speak at the end of current TCU (by name, gaze or contextual aspects of what is said), the selected speaker has the right and obligation to speak next.
  - b. If the current speaker does not select a next speaker, other potential speakers have the right to self-select (the first starter gets the turn)
  - c. If options 1a and 1b have not been implemented, the current speaker may continue with another TCU.
1. At the end of that TCU, the option system applies again.

Based on the turn-taking system, three types of silence may be distinguished:

- Pause: A period of silence within a speaker's TCU, i.e. during a speaker's turn when a sentence is not finished.
- Gap: A period of silence between turns, for example after a question has been asked and not yet answered
- Lapse: A period of silence when no sequence or other structured activity is in progress: the current speaker stops talking, does not select a next speaker, and no one self-selects. Lapses are commonly associated with visual or other forms of disengagement between speakers, even if these periods are brief.

Some types of turns may require extra work before they can successfully take place. Speakers wanting a long turn, for example, to tell a story or describe important news, must first establish that others will not intervene during the course of the telling through some form of preface and approval by the listener (a so-called go-ahead). The preface and its associated go-ahead comprise a pre-sequence. Conversations cannot be appropriately ended by 'just stopping', but require a special closing sequence.

The model also leaves puzzles to be solved, for example, concerning how turn boundaries are identified and projected, and the role played by gaze and body orientation in the management of turn-taking. It also establishes some questions for other disciplines: for example, the split second timing of turn-transition sets up a cognitive 'bottle neck' in which potential speakers must attend to incoming speech while also preparing their own contribution - something which imposes a heavy load of human processing capacity, and which may impact the structure of languages.

However, the original formulation in Sacks et al. 1974 is designed to model turn-taking only in ordinary and informal conversation, and not interaction in more specialized, institutional environments such as meetings, courts, news interviews, mediation hearings, which have distinctive turn-taking organizations that depart in various ways from ordinary conversation. Later studies have looked at institutional interaction and turn-taking in institutional contexts. Interruptions have also been examined and analyzed.

=== Recipient Design ===
In his lectures, Harvey Sacks posited that speakers try to judge what referents their recipients will understand, and design their speech with that in mind, so they will be understood. He called this 'recipient design.' The psychologist Herbert H. Clark called the same concept 'audience design,' while psychologist Howard Giles wrote of 'accommodation.'

=== Sequence organization ===
==== Adjacency pairs ====
Talk tends to occur in responsive pairs; however, the pairs may be split over a sequence of turns. Adjacency pairs divide utterance types into first pair parts and second pair parts to form a pair type. There are many examples of adjacency pairs including Questions-Answers, Offer-Acceptance/Refusal and Compliment-Response.

==== Sequence expansion ====
Sequence expansion allows talk which is made up of more than a single adjacency pair to be constructed and understood as performing the same basic action and the various additional elements are as doing interactional work related to the basic action underway.
Sequence expansion is constructed in relation to a base sequence of a first pair part (FPP) and a second pair part (SPP) in which the core action underway is achieved. It can occur prior to the base FPP, between the base FPP and SPP, and following the base SPP.

- Pre-expansion: an adjacency pair that may be understood as preliminary to the main course of action. A generic pre-expansion is a summon-answer adjacency pair, as in "Mary?"/ "Yes?". It is generic in the sense that it does not contribute to any particular types of base adjacency pair, such as request or suggestion. There are other types of pre-sequence that work to prepare the interlocutors for the subsequent speech action. For example, "Guess what!"/"What?" as preliminary to an announcement of some sort, or "What are you doing?"/"Nothing" as preliminary to an invitation or a request.
- Insert expansion: an adjacency pair that comes between the FPP and SPP of the base adjacency pair. Insert expansions interrupt the activity under way, but are still relevant to that action. Insert expansion allows a possibility for a second speaker, the speaker who must produce the SPP, to do interactional work relevant to the projected SPP. An example of this would be a typical conversation between a customer and a shopkeeper:

Customer: I would like a turkey sandwich, please. (FPP base)
Server: White or wholegrain? (Insert FPP)
Customer: Wholegrain. (Insert SPP)
Server: Okay. (SPP base)

- Post-expansion: a turn or an adjacency pair that comes after, but is still tied to, the base adjacency pair. There are two types: minimal and non-minimal. Minimal expansion is also termed sequence closing thirds, because it is a single turn after the base SPP (hence third) that does not project any further talk beyond their turn (hence closing). Examples of sequence closing thirds include "oh", "I see", "okay", etc.

==== Preference organization ====
CA may reveal structural (i.e. practice-underwritten) preferences in conversation for some types of actions (within sequences of action) over others, as responses in certain sequential environments. For example, responsive actions which agree with, or accept, positions taken by a first action tend to be performed more straightforwardly and faster than actions that disagree with, or decline, those positions. The former is termed a preferred turn shape, meaning the turn is not preceded by silence nor is it produced with delays, mitigation and accounts. The latter is termed a dispreferred turn shape, which describes a turn with opposite characteristics. One consequence of this is that agreement and acceptance are promoted over their alternatives, and are more likely to be the outcome of the sequence. Pre-sequences are also a component of preference organization and contribute to this outcome.

=== Repair ===
Repair organization describes how parties in conversation deal with problems in speaking, hearing, or understanding, and there are various mechanisms through which certain "troubles" in interaction are dealt with. Repair segments are classified by who initiates repair (self or other), by who resolves the problem (self or other), and by how it unfolds within a turn or a sequence of turns. The organization of repair is also a self-righting mechanism in social interaction. Participants in conversation seek to correct the trouble source by initiating and preferring self repair, by the speaker of the trouble source, over other repair. Self repair initiations can be placed in three locations in relation to the trouble source: in a first turn, a transition space or in a third turn.

=== Action formation ===
Turns in interaction implement actions, and a specific turn may perform one (or more) specific actions. The study of action focuses on the description of how turns at talk are composed and positioned so as to realize one or more actions. This could include questions, assessments, storytelling, and complaints. Focus is both on how those actions are formed through linguistic or other activity (the formation of action) and how they are understood (the ascription of action to turns). The study of action also concerns the ways in which the participants’ knowledge, relations, and stances towards the ongoing interactional projects are created, maintained, and negotiated, and thus the intersubjectivity of how people interact. The concept of action within CA resembles, but is different from the concept of speech act in other fields of pragmatics.

== Jeffersonian transcription ==
Gail Jefferson developed a system of transcription while working with Harvey Sacks. In this system, speakers are introduced with a name followed by a colon, as conventionally used in scripts. It is designed to use typographical and orthographical conventions used elsewhere, rather than a strict phonetic system such as the International Phonetic Alphabet. The transcription conventions take into account overlapping speech, delays between speech, pitch, volume and speed based on research showing that these features matter for the conversation in terms of action, turn-taking and more. Transcripts are typically written in a monospaced font to ease the alignment of overlap symbols.

Partial table of annotations added in Jeffersonian Transcription
Feature	Symbol Used	Example
Very quietly spoken	°°...°°	Matt: Shoes °°I love shoes°°_
Quietly spoken	°...°	Sue: Have you had any °symptoms°,?
Loudly spoken	Capital letters	Sara: Why can't you JUST STOP?
Falling pitch	.	Fred: That's a good idea.
Unchanging (level) pitch	_	Matt: That's a good idea_
Slightly rising pitch	,	Matt: We like to shop, and to eat fish,
Intermediately rising pitch	,?	Alex: We're buying shoes,?
Rising pitch	?	Bill: Should we open the door?
Stressed syllables	Underlined letters	Dave: That is a good idea.
Absence of normal pauses	=	Lucy:    Perhaps we should leave= William: =I don't think that's a good idea_
Noticeable pauses	(.)	Lucy: James (.) we need to talk.
Pauses of a specific duration	(Duration)	Lucy: James (1.0) we need to talk.
Rushed speech	><	Alex: What are you doing? Jack: >I need to buy the shoes<
Slowed speech	<>	Fred: <That's a good idea,> I think
Overlapping speech	[...]	Dave: Perhaps we should [leave.] Tom:                    [Go inside,?]
Prolonged sounds (non-phonemic)	:	Dave: O:h wo::w.
Creaky voice	*...*	Lucy:  Do you want to talk? James: *No* (.) Sorry.

There are various transcription systems based on the jeffersonian conventions with slight differences. Galina Bolden has designed a system for transcribing Russian conversations while Samtalegrammatik.dk uses their own system for Danish. GAT2 (Gesprächsanalytisches Transskriptionssystem 2) was also designed originally for German and to systematize the way some of the prosodic features are handled. The TalkBank also has its own system designed for use with its CLAN (CHILDES Language Analyzer) software.

== Different approaches ==
=== Interactional linguistics ===
Interactional linguistics (IL) is Conversation analysis when the focus is on linguistic structure. While CA has worked with language in its data since the beginning, the interest in the structure of it, and possible relations to grammatical theory, was sometimes secondary to sociological (or ethnomethodological) research questions. The field developed during the 90's and got its name with the publication of the 2001 Studies in Interactional Linguistics and is inspired by West Coast functional grammar which is sometimes considered to have effectively merged with IL since then, but has also gained inspiration from British phoneticians doing prosodic analysis. Levinson's former department on Language and Cognition at the Max Planck Institute for Psycholinguistics has been important in connecting CA and IL with linguistic typology. Interactional linguistics has studied topics within syntax, phonetics and semantics as they relate to e.g. action and turn-taking. There is a journal called Interactional Linguistics.

=== Discursive psychology ===
Discursive psychology (DP) is the use of CA on psychological themes, and studies how psychological phenomena are attended to, understood and construed in interaction. The subfield formed through studies by Jonathan Potter and Margaret Wetherell, most notably their 1987 book Discourse and social psychology: Beyond attitudes and behaviour.

=== Membership categorization analysis ===
Membership categorization analysis (MCA) was influenced by the work of Harvey Sacks and his work on Membership Categorization Devices (MCD). Sacks argues that members' categories comprise part of the central machinery of organization and developed the notion of MCD to explain how categories can be hearably linked together by native speakers of a culture. His example that is taken from a children's storybook (The baby cried. The mommy picked it up) shows how "mommy" is interpreted as the mother of the baby by speakers of the same culture. In light of this, categories are inference rich – a great deal of knowledge that members of a society have about the society is stored in terms of these categories. Emanuel Schegloff fleshed out the concept in his article on the formulation of place. When asked 'where are you from?' the recipient can choose to respond in many different ways, eg. Main St., downtown, Irvine, California, the United States. How they respond shows what identity they hope to claim, and the questioner will decide whether the recipient is indeed a member of the group they claim to be a member of based on how they speak going forward. There is a connection here with the Other (philosophy) in philosophy, social identity theory, and The Social Construction of Reality. Stokoe further contends that members’ practical categorizations form part of ethnomethodology's description of the ongoing production and realization of ‘facts’ about social life and including members’ gendered reality analysis, thus making CA compatible with feminist studies.

== Relations to other fields ==
=== Contrasts to other theories about language ===
In contrast to the use of introspection in linguistics, conversation analysis studies naturally occurring talk in a strongly empirical fashion through the use of recordings Unlike ethnographers, Conversation Analysts tend to focus on transcribing recordings, and usually do not question the people doing the talk nor members of their speech community to ask for their interpretations. A lot of CA research has been done by researchers analyzing encounters in their own native tongue rather than in other languages.

Unlike discourse analysis, Conversation Analysts focus on interaction at a micro level, and usually do not look at written texts nor overarching sociocultural concepts (for example, 'discourses' in the Foucauldian sense). Its method, following Garfinkel and Goffman's initiatives, is aimed at uncovering the methods that the interacting members rely on to make sense of each other. Conversation Analysts look for clues to these methods in the actions of the interlocutors themselves rather than trying to impose some outside analytical framework onto them. The aim is to model the resources and methods by which those understandings are produced.

In considering methods of qualitative analysis, Braun and Clarke distinguish thematic analysis from conversation analysis and discourse analysis, viewing thematic analysis to be theory agnostic while conversation analysis and discourse analysis are considered to be based on theories although Sacks himself argued that researchers should follow the data.

=== Applied conversation analysis ===
Conversation analysis is used in various contexts leading to a number of different fields benefitting from conversation analytic findings. This includes the study of doctor-patient interactions, media interviews, second-language acquisition, and various institutional settings. For instance, Tanya Stivers studied the pressures that lead to doctors prescribing antibiotics. A focus on interaction in professional contexts was established by the 1992 book Talk at Work by Paul Drew and John Heritage, but earlier studies had also focused on specific institutional contexts, mostly one at a time. More recently, conversation analysis has also been used in the development of conversational user interfaces and chatbots.

== Criticism ==
Conversation analysis has been criticized for not being able to address issues of power and inequality in society at large. Another point of critique is the focus on single-case analysis and the generalizability of collection-based descriptions has been questioned.

== Bibliography ==
- Beattie, Geoffrey (1983) Talk: An Analysis of Speech and Non-Verbal Behaviour in Conversation. Milton Keynes: Open University Press.
- Heritage, John (1984) Garfinkel and Ethnomethodology. Cambridge: Polity Press.
- Heritage, John and Steven E. Clayman (2010) Talk in Action: Interactions, Identities and Institutions. Boston: Wiley-Blackwell.
- Hutchby, Ian and Wooffitt, Robin (1988) Conversation Analysis. Polity Press.
- Levinson, Stephen C. (1983) Pragmatics. Cambridge University Press. pp 284–370. ISBN 0-521-29414-2.
- Pain, Jean. (2008) Not Just Talking: Conversational Analysis and Psychotherapy. Karnac. ISBN 978-1-85575-689-2
- Psathas, George (1995) Conversation Analysis. Thousand Oaks: Sage.
- Ten Have, Paul (1999) Doing Conversation Analysis. A Practical Guide, Thousand Oaks: Sage.
