= Gail Jefferson =

American sociologist

- Born: April 22, 1938; Iowa City, Iowa, United States
- Died: February 21, 2008 (aged 69); Rinsumageast, Netherlands
- Education: University of California, Los Angeles (B.A.); University of California, Irvine (Ph.D.)
- Occupation: Sociologist

Gail Jefferson (22 April 1938 – 21 February 2008) was an American sociologist with an emphasis in sociolinguistics. She was, along with Harvey Sacks and Emanuel Schegloff, one of the founders of the area of research known as conversation analysis (CA). She is remembered for the methods and notational conventions she developed for transcribing speech, the latter forming the Jefferson Transcription System. This is now used widely in CA research.

== Early life ==
Jefferson was born on April 22, 1938, in Iowa City. Her family then moved to New York for a short period before moving to Los Angeles, where she spent most of her educational years, attending high school, then UCLA.

In 1965, she received a Bachelors of Arts degree in Dance from UCLA. She would go on to complete a PhD in Social Sciences at UC Irvine in 1972.

She had temporary appointments at the University of Pennsylvania, the University of Massachusetts Amherst and several University of California campuses (UCSB, UCI and UCLA).

After these temporary positions, Jefferson began a more permanent research position at the University of Manchester where she worked from 1978 to 1981. There, she used her methods of transcription in a project with John R.E. Lee titled, "conversations in which 'troubles' and 'anxieties' are expressed".

Four years after her position in the UK, she traveled to Tilburg, Netherlands (1981–1983) where she became a research associate with Konrad Ehlich. Together, they worked on a project involving overlap and interpretation.

In 1984, she returned to the UK and began an honorary position at the University of York.

She moved back to the Netherlands in 1987 and married Albert Stuulen. She remained there until she died in Rinsumageest, The Netherlands, in 2008 at the age of 69.

== Conversation Analysis ==
Jefferson's work in conversation analysis began as a part of her coursework in a class she took in the spring of 1965 that was taught by Harvey Sacks. She enrolled in the class to fulfill her graduation requirement for her dance major. She had learned basic transcription skills through her work as a clerk typist at the UCLA Department of Public Health and her experience and work there in transcribing sensitivity-training sessions for prison guards. This gave her the experience that allowed her to begin transcribing some of the recordings that served as the materials out of which Sacks’ earliest lectures were developed. She transcribed many of his lectures on the topic and edited and released them after his death. Later she did graduate work under his supervision, by which time she was already beginning to shape the field conceptually as well as through her transcriptions of the really fine details of interaction, including the detail of laughter, capturing as closely as possible precisely what is said and how it is said, rather than glossing things in the talk as, for instance ((S laughs)). Along with Sacks and Schegloff, Jefferson is also known for her studies of turn-taking in conversation. While working with Sacks, Jefferson’s contribution to the study of Conversation Analysis was particularly significant at the time, as Conversation Analysis was not only a new field in sociology but also indicated the beginning of the focus on micro-sociology, another subtopic within the field of sociology. Jefferson directed her main focus toward two key foundational aspects of interaction which were moment-by-moment shaping interaction, and re-shaping interaction. Her contributions toward these two types of interaction, in addition to her explanation of how interaction correlates with unpredictability, are what separated her benefactions from other sociologists within the field of Conversation Analysis.

During the last ten years of her life, Jefferson worked on transcribing the Watergate tapes. The Watergate tapes were composed of 22 transcripts of 37th President Richard Nixon's conversations with his lawyers and some of his closest staff members. Jefferson produced all of these transcripts in MS Word Format and also transcribed four of them using a typewriter. Additionally, one of Jefferson’s specific focuses within sociolinguistics was laughter. Consequently, in 2007 she presented her final paper on the machinery of laughter at a conference in Sweden. This final paper incorporated statistics taken from her transcriptions of the Watergate tapes, along with some of the dialogue she had with Harvey Sacks in her younger years.

== Later life ==
Over four decades, for the majority of which she held no university position and was unsalaried, Jefferson’s research into talk-in-interaction has set the standard for what became known as CA. Her contributions to Conversation Analysis were significant as she created what is now referred to as "Jeffersonian Transcription" or the "Jeffersonian Transcription System". This system is composed of several different symbols each followed by a detailed explanation of what the symbol itself represents in the context which it is used. The underlying purpose of this system is to aid in the identification of speech patterns, and assist those trying to annotate a conversation. Her work has greatly influenced the sociological study of interaction, but also disciplines beyond, especially linguistics, communication, and anthropology. It would not be so much true that her work was inter- or multi-disciplinary as that disciplinary boundaries were irrelevant to her enquiries into what Erving Goffman referred to as the “interaction order.”

== Selected bibliography ==
- Jefferson, G. (1972). Side sequences. In D. Sudnow (Ed.), Studies in social interaction (pp. 294–338). New York: Free Press.
- Jefferson, G. (1986). Notes on 'latency' in overlap onset. Human Studies, 9, 153–183.
- Jefferson, G. (1988). On The Sequential Organization Of Troubles-Talk In Ordinary Conversation. Social Problems, 35, 418–441.
- Jefferson, G. (1991). List construction as a task and resource. In G. Psathas, ed. Interactional Competence. New York, NY: Irvington Publishers. pp. 63–92.
- Jefferson, G. (2004). Glossary of transcript symbols with an introduction. In G. Lerner (Ed.), Conversation analysis: Studies from the first generation (pp. 13–31). Amsterdam, Netherlands: John Benjamins Publishing.
- Sacks, H., Schegloff, E., & Jefferson, G. (1974). A simplest systematics for the organization of turn-taking for conversation. Language, 50, 696–735.
- Schegloff, E., Jefferson, G., & Sacks, H. (1977). The preference for self-correction in the organization of repair in conversation. Language, 53, 361–382.
