= Emanuel Schegloff =

American sociologist (1937–2024)

- Born: July 24, 1937; Brooklyn, New York, US
- Died: May 23, 2024 (aged 86); Santa Monica, California, US
- Other name: Manny Schegloff
- Known for: conversation analysis

Academic background
- Education: Hebrew Teacher's College; Harvard University; University of California, Berkeley
- Thesis: The First Five Seconds: The Order of Conversational Opening (1967)
- Doctoral advisor: Erving Goffman

Academic work
- Institutions: Columbia University; UCLA

Emanuel Abraham "Manny" Schegloff (July 24, 1937 – May 23, 2024) was an American sociologist and sociolinguist who was a distinguished professor of sociology at the University of California at Los Angeles.

== Life and career ==
Schegloff was born in a Jewish household in Brooklyn, New York and raised in Boston. He studied journalism at the Hebrew Teacher's College from 1953 to 1957 where he was awarded a Bachelor of Jewish Education (cum laude). He also had a Bachelor of Arts from Harvard College, where he studied 1954–58. He took a Master of Arts at University of California, Berkeley 1958–1963. He finished a PhD in 1967 and move. In 1972, Schegloff moved back to California and started working at UCLA as an assistant professor of sociology. In 1996, he was promoted to distinguished professor of sociology, from 2010 emeritus. Along with his collaborators Harvey Sacks and Gail Jefferson, Schegloff is regarded as a co-creator of the field of conversation analysis.They and their students have developed methods, vocabulary, and a transcription system for their analysis.” Alongside Harvey Sacks, Gail Jefferson, and Schegloff, their students also helped develop most of the key parts of their analysis. Research on Language and Social Interaction, vol.57, no. 3, 2024, pp. 255-256. “Since the mid-1960s, more than 11,000 research papers and monographs in conversation analysis have now been published and, in addition to North America, CA is practiced on almost every continent and addresses more than 100 languages.” The growth and development of CA has been substantially contingent on this achievement to which Schegloff has made a substantial, indeed latterly, an overwhelming contribution.” (Tampone). This shows the achievement that Schegloff did in helping grow and develop the field of conversation analysis.“Though understandably difficult to implement, I would have liked to have seen a smoother integration of these two dimensions and more regular cross-referencing between discussions of how we perform quantitative tests (i.e. what we are doing) and discussions of what the results of those tests can tell us (i.e. why we are doing it)

Schegloff died on May 23, 2024, at the age of 86.

== Honours and memberships ==
Schegloff became a member of the Sociological Research Association in 1990 and was declared "Outstanding Scholar of the Year" by the Language and Social Interaction Division of the International Communication Association in 1995. In 2010, he received the Lifetime Achievement Award from the American Sociological Association.

Schegloff was a member of the council of the American Sociological Association 1997–2000. He was a fellow of the Center for Advanced Study in the Behavioral Sciences 1998–99 and a Guggenheim Fellow 1998–99. He was a member of the editorial board for Language in Society (1971–72), Behavioral and Brain Sciences (1979–1983), Sociological Theory (1981–83), Poetics Today (1979–1992 and later), Discourse Processes (from 1975), Journal of Pragmatics (from 1981) and the honorary editorial board of Discourse Studies (from 1997).

== Selected publications ==
- Ochs, Elinor, Emanuel Schegloff and Sandra Thompson. (1996) Interaction and Grammar. Cambridge University Press. ISBN 0-521-55828-X
- Harvey Sacks, Emanuel A. Schegloff, Gail Jefferson. "A Simplest Systematics for the Organization of Turn-Taking for Conversation." Language, Vol. 50, No. 4, Part 1 (Dec., 1974), pp. 696–735
- Schegloff, Emanuel A. (1972). "Notes on a conversational practice: formulating place." David Sudnow (ed). Studies in Social Interaction. New York: Free Press.
- Schegloff, Emanuel A. (2007). Sequence organization in interaction: A primer in conversation analysis. Cambridge: Cambridge University Press. ISBN 0-521-82572-5
- Tampone,Azaria. "Presenting Emanuel A. Schegloff" Academia University.
- Standford University. “Emanuel A Schegloff and Harvey Sacks, Opening up and Closing”
