= English Text Construction =

- Discipline: Linguistics, literature
- Language: English
- Edited by: Gaëtanelle Gilquin, Lieven Vandelanotte

Publication details
- History: 2008–present
- Publisher: John Benjamins Publishing Company
- Frequency: Biannually

Standard abbreviations
- ISO 4: Engl. Text Constr.

Indexing
- ISSN: 1874-8767 (print); 1874-8775 (web)
- OCLC no.: 804255495

Links
- Journal homepage; Online access

English Text Construction is a biannual peer-reviewed academic journal covering English studies, including applied linguistics, English language teaching, cultural studies, linguistics, and literary studies. It is published by John Benjamins Publishing Company and was established in 2008. The journal publishes articles and book reviews, as well as review articles. The editors-in-chief are Gaëtanelle Gilquin (Université catholique de Louvain) and Lieven Vandelanotte (Facultés universitaires Notre-Dame de la Paix and Katholieke Universiteit Leuven).

== Abstracting and indexing ==
The journal is abstracted and indexed in Linguistics and Language Behavior Abstracts, MLA International Bibliography, and Scopus.
