= Cognitive rhetoric =

Cognitive rhetoric refers to an approach to rhetoric, composition, and pedagogy as well as a method for language and literary studies drawing from, or contributing to, cognitive science.

== History ==
Following the cognitive revolution, cognitive linguists, computer scientists, and cognitive psychologists have borrowed terms from rhetorical and literary criticism. Specifically, metaphor is a fundamental concept throughout cognitive science, particularly for cognitive linguistic models in which meaning-making is dependent on metaphor production and comprehension.

Computer scientists and philosophers of mind draw on literary studies for terms like "scripts", "stories", "stream of consciousness", "multiple drafts", and "Joycean machine". Cognitive psychologists have researched literary and rhetorical topics such as "reader response" and "deixis" in narrative fiction, and transmission of poetry in oral traditions.

== Composition ==
Rhetoric is a term often used in reference to composition studies and pedagogy, a tradition that dates back to Ancient Greece. The emergence of rhetoric as a teachable craft (techne) links rhetoric and composition pedagogy, notably in the tradition of Sophism. Aristotle collected Sophist handbooks on rhetoric and critiqued them in Synagoge Techne (fourth century BCE).

In Ancient Rome, the Greek rhetorical tradition was absorbed and became vital to education, as rhetoric was valued in a highly political society with an advanced system of law, where speaking well was crucial to winning favor, alliances, and legal rulings.

Cognitive rhetoricians focusing on composition (such as Linda Flower and John Hayes) draw from the paradigm, methods, and terms of cognitive science to build a pedagogy of composition, where writing is an instance of everyday problem-solving processes. Colleagues at Carnegie Mellon, Flower and Hayes conducted studies on problem-solving in writing using think-aloud protocols where subjects talk as they solve a problem showing what is happening in their minds while writing.

Janet Emig explored elements of the writing process and the relationship between process and product. Building upon cognitive theories of transactional and experiential learning by John Dewey and Jean Piaget, Emig's contribution to cognitive rhetoric is her differentiation between speech acts and writing acts. Because speaking and writing are different ways of performing linguistic functions, Emig argues that the process of speaking and the process of writing result in differing means of expression. One issue Emig points out is that writing can be a sort of trap since the writer becomes a participant in the event through their writing. Another issue Emig identifies involves the way the structure of writing can shape how an event is presented by the writer. This structure becomes a conflict, Emig asserts, because writing should be dictated by the writer's experience—not the form.

Patricia Bizzell juxtaposes writing and thinking to illustrate problems between form and convention. Bizzell identifies two theoretical positions: (1) inner-directed theorists approach writing instruction by focusing on style and conventions, and (2) outer-directed theorists believe these language functions are innate. The inner-directed theory is where students use what they know and apply it to a writing situation (thinking process). The outer-directed theory argues forms can't be taught because how writers choose language may be different depending on the rhetorical situation of the writing task or objective (social process). According to Bizzell, students participate in a variety of discourse communities, and writers are limited by the writer's ability to define the rules which exist in that particular discourse. Bizzell calls for a more flexible process that considers where the writer is at in their process and argues that the writer should use what they know to apply to the task; then, go back and figure out what they don't know—adapting their task to the situation.

James A. Berlin has argued that by focusing on professional composition and communications and ignoring ideology, social-cognitive rhetoric—which maps structures of the mind onto structures of language and the interpersonal world—lends itself to use as a tool for training workers in corporate capitalism. Berlin contrasts social-cognitive rhetoric with social-epistemic rhetoric, which makes ideology the core issue of composition pedagogy.

== Language and literary studies ==
Cognitive rhetoric offers a new way of looking at properties of literature from the perspective of cognitive science. It is interdisciplinary in character and committed to data and methods that produce falsifiable theory. Rhetoric also offers a store of stylistic devices observed for their effect on audiences, providing a rich index with distinguished examples available to researchers in cognitive neuropsychology and cognitive science.

For Mark Turner (a prominent figure in cognitive rhetoric), narrative imaging is the fundamental instrument of everyday thought. Individuals organize experience in a constant narrative flow, starting with small spatial stories. Meaning is fundamentally parabolic (like a parable): two or more event shapes or conceptual spaces converge (blending) in the parabolic process, generating concepts with unique properties not found in either of the inputs. This process is everyday: anticipating that an object you are headed toward will make contact with you is a parable whereby you project a spatial viewpoint. Such narrative flow is a highly adaptive process, crucial for planning, evaluating, explaining, as well as recalling the past and imagining a future. Thus, literary processes have adaptive value prior to the emergence of linguistic capability (modular or continuous).

== Related work ==
- Brain imaging
- Perception
- Rhetorical figures
- Rhetorical stylistics

== Key terms ==
- Binding
- Cognitive instability
- Conceptual blending
- Conceptual metaphor
- Projection

== Notable researchers ==
=== Cognitive rhetoric ===
- Ellen Spolsky
- George Lakoff
- Mark Johnson
- Mark Turner
- Raymond Gibbs
- Reuven Tsur
- Todd Oakley

=== Social-cognitive rhetoric ===
- John Hayes
- Linda Flower

=== Social-epistemic rhetoric ===
- James A. Berlin

=== Cognitive poetics ===
- Reuven Tsur

== See also ==
- Cognitive historicism
- Cognitive linguistics
- Cognitive neuropsychology
- Cognitive philology
- Cognitive poetics
- Cognitive science

== Bibliography ==
=== Cognitive rhetoric ===
- Fahnestock, Jeanne. "Rhetoric in the Age of Cognitive Science". The Viability of Rhetoric. Graff, Richard. ed. New York: State University of New York Press, 2005.
- Gibbs, Raymond. The Poetics of Mind: Figurative Thought, Language, and Understanding. Cambridge: Cambridge University Press, 1993.
- Jackson, Tony. "Issues and Problems in the Blending of Cognitive Science, Evolutionary Psychology, and Literary Study." Poetics Today, 23.1 (2002) 161–179.
- Jackson, Tony. "Questioning Interdisciplinarity: Cognitive Science, Evolutionary Psychology, and Literary Criticism". Poetics Today, 21: 319–47.
- Johnson, Mark. The Body in the Mind: The Bodily Basis of Meaning, Imagination and Reason. Chicago: University of Chicago Press, 1987.
- Lakoff, George, and Mark Turner. More than Cool Reason: A Field Guide to Poetic Metaphor. Chicago: University of Chicago Press, 1989.
- Lakoff, George. "The Contemporary Theory of Metaphor." In Metaphor and Thought, 2nd ed. Ed. Andrew Ortony. Cambridge: Cambridge University Press, 1993.
- Lakoff, George. Women, Fire, and Dangerous Things: What Categories Reveal about the Mind. Chicago: University of Chicago Press, 1987.
- Oakley, Todd. "From Attention to Meaning: Explorations in Semiotics, Linguistics, and Rhetoric." European Semiotics Series, Volume 8. Lang Verlag, 2009.
- Parrish, Alex C. Adaptive Rhetoric: Evolution, Culture, and the Art of Persuasion. New York: Routledge, 2013.
- Pinker, Stephen. Words and Rules: The Ingredients of Language. New York: Basic Books, 1999.
- Richardson, Alan. "Literature and the Cognitive Revolution: An Introduction." Poetics Today, 23.1 (2002) 1–8.
- Shen, Yeshayahu. "Cognitive Aspects of Metaphor". Poetics Today, 13.4: 567–74.
- Tomascello, Michael. "Language Is Not an Instinct." Cognitive Development, 10 (1995): 131–56.
- Turner, Mark. Death is the Mother of Beauty: Mind, Metaphor, and Criticism. Chicago: University of Chicago Press, 1987
- Turner, Mark. Reading Minds: The Study of English in the Age of Cognitive Science. Princeton: Princeton University Press, 1991.

=== Cognitive rhetoric, composition, and pedagogy ===
- Berlin, James. "Rhetoric and Ideology in the Writing Class". College English, 50.5 September 1988: 477–494.
- Bruner, Jerome S. The Process of Education. Cambridge: Harvard University Press, 1960.
- Bruner, Jerome S., R.R.Oliver and P.M. Greenfield et al. Studies in Cognitive Growth. New York: John Wiley, 1967.
- Christensen, Francis. Notes Toward a New Rhetoric: Six Essays for Teachers. New York: Harper and Row, 1967.
- Flower, Linda and John R. Hayes. "A Cognitive Process Theory of Writing." College Composition and Communications, 32 (1981): 365–87.
- Flower, Linda. Problem-Solving Strategies for Writing. 2nd Ed. San Diego: Harcourt, 1985.
- Flower, Linda. The Construction of Negotiated Meaning: A Social Cognitive Theory of Writing. Carbondale and Edwardsvill: Southern Illinois University Press, 1994.
- Hayes, John R. and Linda Flower. "Cognitive Processes in Revision." In Rosenberg (ed.), Advances In Applied Psycholinguistics. New York: Cambridge University Press, 1987.
- Shor, Ira. Critical Teaching and Everyday Life. Chicago: University of Chicago Press, 1987.
- Tsur, Reuven. "The Place of Nonconceptual Information in University Education with Special Reference to Teaching Literature". Pragmatics & Cognition, 17 (2009): 309–330.
- Tsur, Reuven. Toward a Theory of Cognitive Poetics. Amsterdam: North-Holland. 1992.
