= Synaesthesia (rhetorical device) =

Describing one sense in terms of another

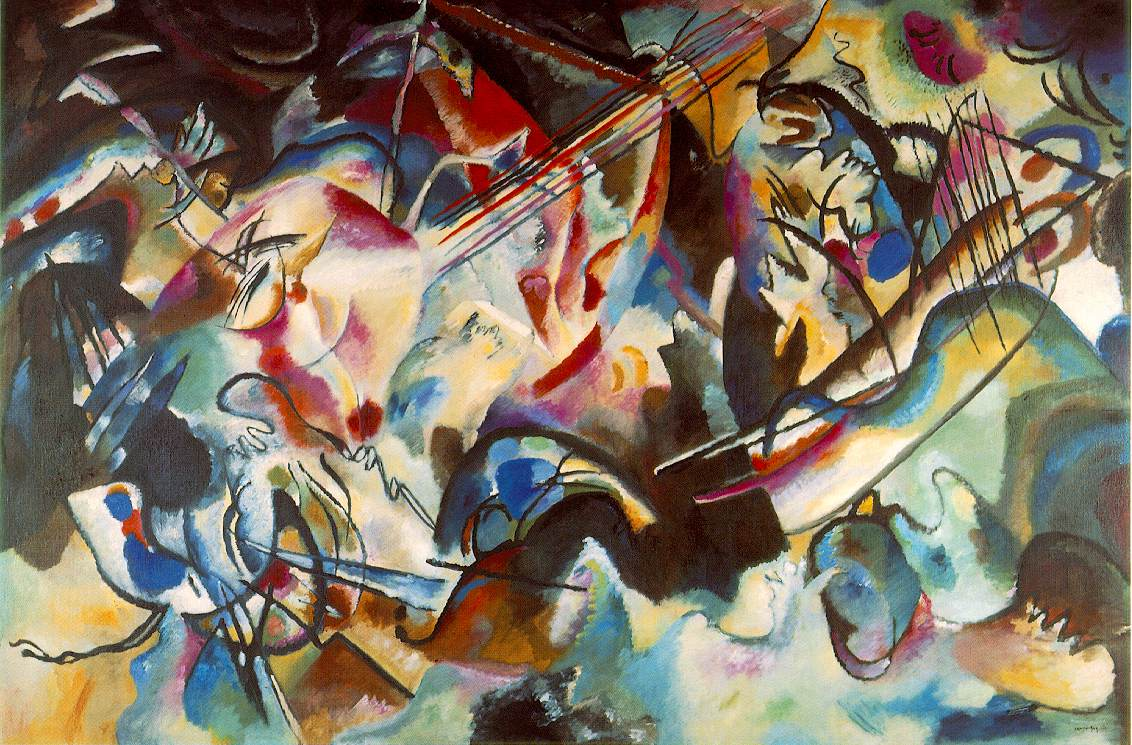
Composition VI (1913) is a work by Vassily Kandinsky (who may have had syanesthesia) that deals with non-scientific relations between colors and sound in art.

Synaesthesia is a rhetorical device or figure of speech where one sense is described in terms of another. This may often take the form of a simile. One can distinguish the literary joining of terms derived from the vocabularies of sensory domains from synaesthesia as a neuropsychological phenomenon. A simple example of synaesthesia is "a bright sound" or "quiet color."

== Panchronistic tendencies ==
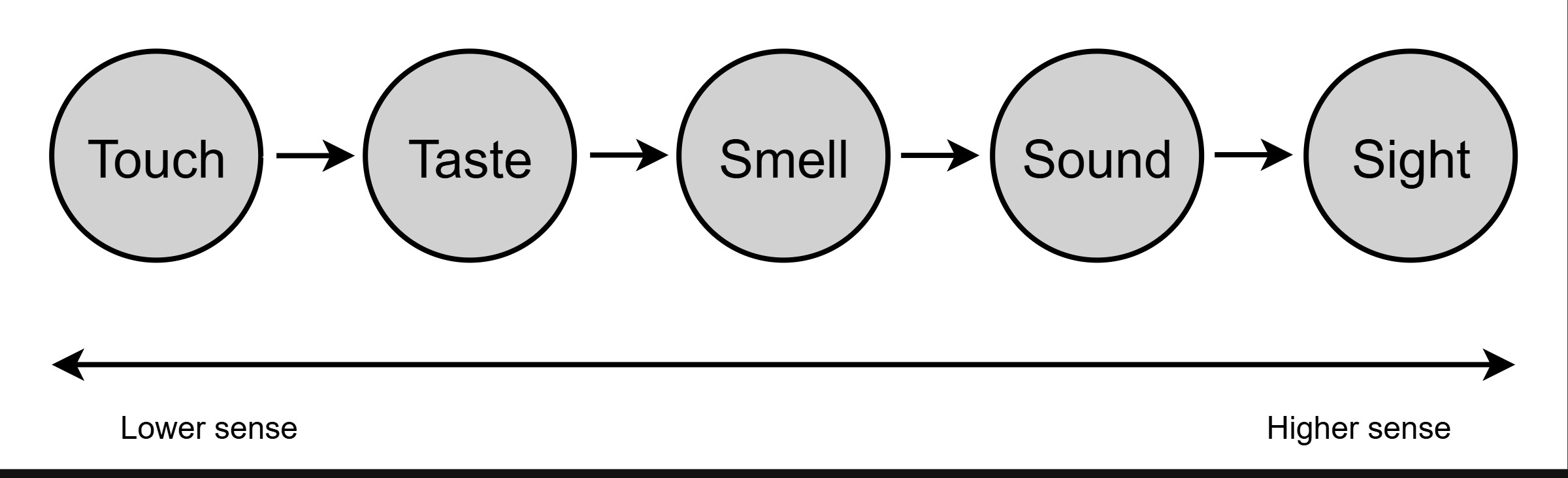
Diagram of the order of senses according to Stephen Ullmann

It has been suggested that, in the tradition of Romantic poetry, the sensory transfer consisting in the synaesthesic metaphor tends to be from a lower (less differentiated) sense to a higher sense. In this respect, the sequence of senses from low to high is generally taken to be touch, taste, smell, sound, then sight. This observation was named a panchronistic tendency by Stephen Ullmann since he saw the lowest levels of sense having the poorest vocabulary. Upwards transfers are thought to have strong emotional effects, but downwards transfers generally witty effects.

The more antipodal and discordant the sensory qualities are, according to Tsur, the more witty the device is perceived as; consequently, the reconciliation or similarity in the qualities gives a more emotional effect. Stable, opposed to less-defined, qualities of a sense often resist fusion into a soft focus to facilitate an emotion effect. Tsur argues, for example, that the strangeness in the quote from Keats' Endymion, The same bright face I tasted in my sleep, despite its upward transfer (taste → sight), derives from the stable characteristic (the definite shape of face) resisting tasting.

== Types and examples ==
Synaesthesia can often be used in the form of a simile:

- "his words cut the air like a dagger" (Oscar Wilde, The Picture of Dorian Gray)
- "thy voice is like wine to me" (Oscar Wilde, Salome)

When a modifier which would normally apply to one sense is used collocating a noun evocative of another sense, this is known as transmodal modification:

- "mauve Hungarian music" (Oscar Wilde, An Ideal Husband)
- "The wild ducks cry / is faintly white" (Bashō)

When a noun evoking one sense is linked with a predicate evoking another, this is known as transmodal predication:

- "My nostrils see her breath burn like a bush." (Dylan Thomas, When all my Five and Country Senses See)
- "the silence that dwells in the forest is not so black" (Oscar Wilde, Salome)
- "I see a voice; now will I to the chink, / To spy an I can hear my Thisby’s face." (Shakespeare, A Midnight Summer's Dream, act 5, scene 1)

When a linkage of two senses depends upon a pun, this is known as synaesthetic polysemy:

"the hyacinth purple, and white, and blue,
Which flung from its bells a sweet peal anew
Of music"

— Percy Bysshe Shelley, The Sensitive Plant

In Romantic poetry and 19th-century French literature, the literary use of synaesthesia was associated with altered states of consciousness or dreamy and hallucinatory moods. In modern poetry (as well as some other older types of poetry, including mannerist poetry), synaesthesia is typically used for its witty quality.
