= Mediated stylistics =

Mediated stylistics or media stylistics is a new and still emerging approach to the analysis of media texts (e.g. news programs, newspaper articles). It aims to take seriously two ideas: first, that media texts involve 'the construction of stories by other means'; and second, that in an age marked by digital connectivity, media texts are inherently interactive phenomena. To meet this twofold aim, mediated stylistics has brought together the analytic toolkits of discursive psychology—which is finely attuned to the contextual specificities of interaction—and stylistics—which is finely attuned to the grammatical/rhetorical/narratorial specificities of texts as texts. Recent research in which mediated stylistics has been put to work, for instance, has shown how mediated representation of issues like sexism, sexualisation, alleged rape and violence against women can differ, and differ in rhetorically consequential ways, from the original un-mediated source material.

== History ==
As a broadly ethnomethodological approach, mediated stylistics is strongly influenced by discursive psychology (DP), as well as the sociology of scientific knowledge (SSK), membership categorization analysis (MCA), and the work of stylisticians like Mick Short, Paul Simpson and Lesley Jeffries, in which the analytic utility of stylistics for an understanding of data other than strictly 'literary' texts becomes immediately apparent. What unites these approaches is their rejection of a particularly widespread understanding of language in which words-in-here-on-a-page name things-out-there-in-the-world. Because this understanding assumes a natural link between descriptions and the events so described it also assumes a non-linguistic sense of the world as the final arbiter of the in/accuracy of descriptions. For DP, SSK and MCA, however, there can be no socially meaningful sense of the non-linguistic without the founding, constitutive force of language. Although language might not be all there is in the world, it is, nevertheless, all there is in the world that allows for the world to become accountable and knowable to ourselves and others. And once you reject—as these approaches reject—the possibility of some non-linguistic arbiter of accuracy, it follows that all descriptions (whether those we decide to treat as accurate or those we do not) have to be understood as the products of particular, locally specific contexts. The issue is no longer whether mediated texts transmit in/accurate in-formation, but how they act as "vehicles for action", where such actions might include defending someone, accusing someone, confessing to something, or any number of other things. It is here that we see how an ethnomethodological approach to language opens the possibility for a mediated stylistics; that is, for analytical tools traditionally associated with stylistics to be adopted for use within media studies. A journalist writing a news article about 'real events' and a novelist constructing a plausible-yet-imaginary-world may well be working with different materials, but they are both engaged in essentially the same kind of literary task: building descriptive vehicles with the potential to pull off a certain set of contextually specific actions such as detailing, characterizing, informing, confessing, defending, accusing, and so on, in what constitutes an infinitely extendable list of other such social actions.

== Study ==
So what does all of this mean in practice? Traditionally, stylistics has treated literature—whether institutionally sanctioned Literature (with a capital "L") or more popular non-canonical forms of literary writing—as its primary focus. Mediated stylistics, however, in taking seriously the idea that journalists are the "professional storytellers of our age", orients towards the types of creativity and innovation in language-use that are required in and for the construction of mediated stories. This shift in empirical focus requires a shift in analytic focus. For although literary and mediated texts both tell stories, they do so in differing ways. In that stylistics asks how certain aesthetic effects are achieved through the language of a literary text, it is able to assume that the text in question represents a story in which characters, plot, events, etc. have all been constructed by that text's author (e.g. Burton's analysis of Plath's prose, 1982). Media texts, on the other hand, almost always involve attempts to translate—or recontextualise—characters, plots and events that have already been constructed elsewhere, by others, in a different context. Unlike other forms of stylistics, then, mediated stylistics is interested not in one-off stories, but in the various iterations of a story that are reproduced over time and across various contexts. This contrasts with the extremely insightful, but different, form of stylistics developed by Leslie Jeffries known as critical stylistics.

== An example ==
One recent example is Attenborough's article 'Rape is rape (except when it's not): the media, recontextualisation and violence against women' (2014). This article studies mediated reportage of the charges of rape and sexual molestation made against Julian Assange, the editor-in-chief of the organisation WikiLeaks, in late 2010. This event was rich with recontextualising possibilities: during the appeal hearing in which Assange's lawyers challenged the warrant for his arrest, transcripts of the witness statements that had led to the warrant being issued were leaked online. Media commentators took this opportunity to build their own recontextualised descriptions of what actually happened as the (apparently) factual starting points for their own, subsequent evaluations of the (un)fairness and/or (il)legitimacy of the allegations. An analysis of media reports in which those witness statements were passed-on to the public subsequently reveals the textual practices through which Assange's allegedly violent actions were often recontextualised such that their status as violent was readably downgraded, mitigated or even deleted.

== Eastern Europe ==
Media stylistics as a research approach is widely known in Eastern Europe and especially in Russia, through the work of A. Vasileva, M. Kozhina, V. Kostomarov, L. Maydanova, I. Lysakova, K. Rogova, G. Solganik and others.

== See also ==
Useful journals

- Language and Literature
- Journal of Literary Semantics
- Discourse & Communication
- Media linguistics
- Stylistics
