= Text world theory =

Theory of language processing

Text world theory is a cognitive model of language processing which aims to explain how people construct meaning from language. Text world theory and schema theory seek to help people understand how we process language and create mental representations when we read or listen to something. This theory figuratively describes a piece of language (such as a text, a speech or conversation) as a "world" that the reader, hearer or interlocutor must "build" in their mind. Text world theory was first developed by Paul Werth in the 1980s, and has subsequently been used as in education as a method for pupils to engage with literature.

== Origin and development ==
Text world theory is a branch of cognitive linguistics that was first developed by Professor Paul Werth in the 1980s and 1990s. Werth was a text linguist working within generative linguistics who developed his text world theory as a professor of linguistics at the University of Amsterdam. Werth claimed to have created an approach that accounted for all aspects of human communication, but his monograph Text Worlds: Representing Conceptual Space in Discourse was not completed by the time of his death in 1995. Mick Short completed and edited the text between 1995 and 1998, and it was published in 1999.

These ideas have been expanded upon by contemporary researchers like Joanna Gavins. Since Werth's conception of text world theory, the theory has been incorporated into the study of linguistics, stylistics, cognitive poetics, narratology and literary theory. While Werth's study was largely limited to short extracts, text world theory has been expanded and tested against many different discourse types, including personal ads, poetry, recipes and radio programmes.

== Types ==
Text world theory is structured into three conceptual levels: the discourse-world, the text-worlds and world-switches.

=== Discourse worlds ===
The discourse world is the immediate environment a person is in when they are communicating. Discourse worlds can either be shared or split. A shared discourse world would include a face-to-face conversation, whereas a split discourse world would include an author and reader, where the two participants do not share a common environment. An individual's discourse world influences how they interpret language due to their background knowledge, thoughts and feelings. Rather than being an "objective set of physical surroundings", the context of a discourse world is a mental process carried out as part of a negotiation between discourse-world participants.

=== Text worlds ===
Within these discourse worlds, humans create "mental representations" which allow the language they are encountering to be understood. In Text worlds a person uses the linguistic stimuli of the text/speech and expands upon it using their background knowledge, perspectives and emotions. Language acts as a means of refining and determining the schema the reader draws upon. For instance "the house" draws up no schema other than houses the individual reader has experienced in their lifetime, whereas "the abandoned house surrounded by dead trees" likely calls up the linguistic schema of Gothic fiction and its associated features.

=== World-switches ===
World-switches are departures from the initial text world through a shift in space or time. These involve the reader constructing a mental model of a new text world through which the new time or place can be conceptualised. For instance, "Gavin stared at the crowd of revellers at the staff party..." plants the reader in one text world. However, if the sentence continued "...and he recalled the school discos of his lonely childhood", this would constitute a world shift that requires readers to call upon new schema quite differentiated from the original text world.

==== Participant-accessible and enactor-accessible worlds ====
Worlds that are accessible to every enactor within that world are known as participant accessible. This means that multiple characters in the text are having the same experience and express their own judgment of it. Enactor accessible means that only one enactor can access that world. One example of this might be an individual's imagination or inner feelings.

==== Modal Worlds ====
Modal worlds are distinct from world-switches. Changes in time and space are world-switches, while shifts in perception are described as modal worlds. They express modes of approaching the world and are only accessible to the enactors of the text experiencing these shifts.

- In the perception modality, the enactor's sub-world is believed to be factual and true: "surely she was wrong about the price of the book."
- In the deontic modality, the character expresses a form of duty or a requirement they must fulfill: "it was required that he feed the animals."
- The boulomaic modality refers to a particular desire the character has, such as a fantasy or ideal and is often demonstrated through verbs like 'wish', 'hope' and 'desire'.

=== Example ===
The first clause of Italo Calvino's short story 'The Man Who Shouted Teresa' is "I stepped off the pavement". When this is read, a split discourse world occurs due to the separation between Calvino and the reader. The reader will locate their text world in the past due to the past tense verb "stepped", and will identify a character (presumably a protagonist) with whom the reader is expected to identify through the first person pronoun, "I." The word "pavement" makes the reader use their background knowledge in order to build a text world in which this action takes place, and this will differ between readers. While many readers might construct an urban environment based on this word, each reader's text world would be informed by how their background knowledge and lived experience has influenced their understanding of the word "pavement".

== Approach ==
Text world scholars often use diagrams as initial points of entry for analysing different texts. This is to provide a visual way of understanding the different text worlds at play, as well as highlight the key elements of the schema the reader is being asked to call upon. They are used to demonstrate complex structures in a relatively simple way. A basic diagram of a single text-world from the first paragraphs of The Old Man and the Sea is shown below. The material actions or verbs are denoted with the arrow symbol →, while descriptions are marked with the = symbol.

TEXT-WORLD 1
Time:

End of fortieth day without a catch

Location:

Gulf Stream

On a boat

Enactors:

Old man (Santiago) → refusing to let boy join again

The boy → helps Santiago with lines, other equipment

Objects:

skiff = empty

scars = running down Santiago's face

sea → reflecting the sun

sail = furled, like a flag of defeat

lines = coiled

The diagram demonstrates how the first few paragraphs could trigger schemas around poverty, manual labour, conflict with nature, and loneliness. These diagrams can become significantly more sophisticated, with links to multiple text-worlds demonstrating when world-shifts occur. Text world scholars typically use diagrams as an entry point into the reader's experience and the cognitive experience of reading the text, which they elaborate on through in-depth analysis.

== Use in education ==
Text world theory has been used in schools in order to encourage a personal engagement with texts from pupils and help teachers to understand the "nature of communicative interaction and literary transaction." Louise Rosenblatt argues two types of reading are efferent reading (reading with an outcome in mind, such as reading a cookbook in order to make a meal) and aesthetic reading (reading while examining the emotional and intellectual experience of the reader). She argues that pupils are implicitly encouraged to read poetry in an efferent way. To show this, she gives an example of a third-grade textbook wherein a poem about a cow is followed by the question, "what facts does this poem teach you?". This literal-mindedness, she argues, had removed the agency of the pupil as a reader, which leads to a reduced engagement with literature.

This aspect of Rosenblatt's writing, part of her work on reader response theory, has been linked to text world theory. Text world theory provides a model through which pupils can build an "authentic" text world, and monitor their cognitive experience while reading a text. It also models the "creative nature" inherent in the reading process as pupils construct their unique text worlds.

In a classroom setting, discourse-worlds are complicated by the fact that there are multiple participants engaging with the discourse world, namely the other pupils and the educational staff. Moreover, in a classroom setting, there is often an unequal distribution of power. Marcello Giovanelli argues that this unequal distribution of power can often lead to pupils believing that their interpretations of literature are less valuable than their teachers, which, in turn, leads to pupils failing to build an independent "text world". One of the solutions that Giovanelli gives to this issue is the importance of pictorial representations of texts as related to the work in education through semiotics by Charles Suhor.

Several researchers have observed the benefits of using approaches informed by text world theory in the classroom. They both give pupils an understanding of the importance of multiple interpretations of texts, and give teachers a model for how pupils construct meaning during the reading process.
