= Kuiken =

Kuiken is a surname of Dutch origin. Notable people with the surname include:

- Attje Kuiken (born 1977), Dutch politician
- Don Kuiken, American psychologist
