= International Society for the Empirical Study of Literature =

International Society for the Empirical Study of Literature and Media
- Purpose: Empirical study of literature
- Website: igelsociety.org

The International Society for the Empirical Study of Literature and Media (IGEL: Internationale Gesellschaft für Empirische Literaturwissenschaft) is a learned society with the object of promoting empirical approach to the study of literature and culture.

== History ==
The society was founded in 1987 by Siegfried J. Schmidt of the University of Siegen. In 2010 IGEL became a registered society; it is registered as a Foundation in the Netherlands. The actual president is Moniek Kuijpers.

== Governance ==
The Society is led by a governing board. Members of the board are the president, a vice-president, treasurer, secretary, member at large, journal editor, and student representative. The board is elected at the bi-annual meeting usually held in August/September for a two or four-year term. Presidents of IGEL:

- 1987-1988: Siegfried J. Schmidt, University of Siegen
- 1988-1990: Elrud Ibsch, VU University Amsterdam
- 1990-1992: Arthur C. Graesser, University of Memphis
- 1992-1994: László Halász, Hungarian Academy of Sciences
- 1994-1996: Steven Tötösy de Zepetnek, University of Alberta
- 1996-1998: Els B. Andringa, Utrecht University
- 1998-2000: Gerald C. Cuphik, University of Toronto
- 2000-2002: János László, University of Pécs
- 2002-2004: David S. Miall, University of Alberta
- 2004-2006: Willie van Peer, LMU Munich
- 2006-2008: Max Louwerse, University of Memphis
- 2008-2012: Marisa Bortolussi, University of Alberta
- 2012-2016: Frank Hakemulder, Utrecht University
- 2016-2020: Don Kuiken, University of Alberta
- 2020-: Moniek Kuijpers, University of Basel

== Conferences ==
The Society holds biennial conferences, alternating between Europe and North America.

- 1987: Siegen
- 1990: Amsterdam
- 1992: Memphis
- 1994: Budapest
- 1996: Edmonton
- 1998: Utrecht
- 2000: Toronto
- 2002: Pécs
- 2004: Edmonton
- 2006: München
- 2008: Memphis
- 2010: Utrecht
- 2012: Montreal
- 2014: Torino
- 2016: Chicago
- 2018: Stavanger
- 2021: Liverpool
- 2022: Orlando (online)
- 2023: Monopoli

== Publications ==
Scientific Study of Literature (SSOL) is the official journal of IGEL. IGEL membership includes a subscription to SSOL.

== See also ==
- Cognitive linguistics
- Cognitive philology
- Cognitive poetics
- Cognitive psychology
- Empirical study of literature
- Literary theory
- Society for the History of Authorship, Reading and Publishing
