= Paolo Canettieri =

Italian philologist (born 1965)

Paolo Canettieri (born 1965, Viterbo) is an Italian Romance philologist. He is a full professor at the University of Rome and researcher in the Department of European, American and Intercultural Studies. He is one of the founders of Cognitive philology and Editor in chief of the Journal with the same name. Canettieri's research interests include cognitive poetics and textual criticism (ecdotics). He discovered that the 6-1-5-2-4-3 permutation formula of the sestina coincides with that of the distribution of the points on the dice.

He worked in analysis, synthesis and reviews of romance medieval literature (Italian, Provencal, French, Spanish, Portuguese), with particular emphasis on poetry and its formal structures. He also wrote essays on William IX of Aquitaine, Jaufre Rudel, Arnaut Daniel, Thibaut de Champagne, Alfonso X, Iacopone da Todi, Dante Alighieri, Francesco Petrarca, Luigi Pirandello. He is interested in relationship among latin and romance versification and the reception of troubadour lyrics in the Middle Ages, in the Renaissance and in the contemporary. He published editions and comments (also in electronic sizes) and drew up databases, metric and rhymic pattern catalogues in electronic format.

Since 1996, he has directed projects for the digitization of medieval romance literatures. In 1998 the digital critical editions of two Galician-Portuguese troubadours, Martin Codax and Pero Meogo, were among the first published on the net. He conceived:

1. Trouveors (electronic concordances of Old French Lyric, with new critical texts);

2. Lirica Medievale Romanza (digital editions of medieval romance poetry);

3. Repertorio metrico unificato della lirica medievale romanza (metrical repertory of medieval romance lyric);

4. Prosopographical Atlas of Romance Literature (geolocalization and indexing of medieval romance literatures).

His works mainly concern: versification and melodic analysis, texts history and attributions, cultural history of ideas, theory of literary genres, intertextuality - etymology and linguistics, selfdefinitions of texts and methods of determination of Corpora, Contrafacta and intertextuality, semantics of metrical structures, relationship between games and ecdotics, relationship between literary text and literary treatises, philology and cognitive sciences, philology and information theory.
