= David Ian Hanauer =

American linguist and academic

- Born: May 17, 1960 (age 66); England
- Occupations: Professor of English & Applied Linguistics
- Known for: Scientific study of literature; science education and assessment
- Awards: John Hayes Award for Excellence in Writing Research

Academic background
- Education: Bar-Ilan University [PhD]
- Thesis: Poetic Text Processing (1994)
- Doctoral advisor: Joel Walters

Academic work
- Discipline: Applied Linguistics
- Sub-discipline: Education
- Institutions: Indiana University of Pennsylvania; University of Pittsburgh

David Ian Hanauer (born 1960) is a professor of Applied Linguistics/English at Indiana University of Pennsylvania and the lead assessment coordinator for the SEA-PHAGES program at the University of Pittsburgh. He is the former editor-in-chief of the Scientific Study of Literature journal, the official publication of IGEL (International Society for the Empirical Study of Literature). An applied linguist specializing in assessment and literacy practices in the sciences and poetic inquiry, he has authored or co-authored over 88 journal articles and book chapters as well as 8 books. Hanauer’s research agenda is typified by the combination of qualitative and quantitative methods, as well as arts-based approaches, and scientific measurement of concepts traditionally considered abstract, such as voice in written text, project ownership and poeticity.

== Research and professional contributions ==
=== Science education ===
In several writings, Hanauer stresses the need for pedagogical innovation in science education. He argues that the scientific disciplines have historically tended to rely on a narrow range of externally derived assessment tools, such as multiple choice tests. Contending that such measures often fail to promote the “personal feelings of excitement and fulfillment so characteristic of the active scientist” among learners, Hanauer calls for active assessment in the sciences. Active assessment is guided by the principles that science teaching should be informed by procedural knowledge of scientific inquiry, occur in laboratory settings, and culminate in authentic scientific discovery.

Hanauer has published several studies demonstrating evidence of a positive correlation between enhanced student learning outcomes and the development of a sense of project ownership in science classrooms. Data from these studies was obtained via inter-institutional collaborations, and his own experiences with implementing an active assessment program in a bacteriophage laboratory at the University of Pittsburgh. Hanauer has also coordinated a research initiative aimed at enhancing science faculty knowledge of assessment that was funded by the Howard Hughes Medical Institute.

Additionally, Hanauer has researched literacy practices among apprentice and established scientists. His work in this vein includes a quantitative investigation of the perceived burden that Mexican scientists associated with the obligation to publish in English, their second language. He has also published a linguistic landscape study of how language is publicly displayed in laboratory contexts to express personal and professional identities, scientific ability, and community membership.

=== Poetic inquiry ===
This area of Hanauer’s research agenda builds upon a small but burgeoning body of qualitative research in the humanities that advocates for poetry writing as a means of eliciting and representing highly personalized understandings of human experience. In a 2010 book, Hanauer challenged conventional thought by proposing that poetry inquiry can be practiced among second language learners even if they possess relatively low proficiency levels and that poetry writing could be used as a research method. On the basis of corpus linguistics and qualitative analysis of poems written by university-level English as a Foreign Language students, Hanauer argues that poetic data “produced through a reflective process and cycles of revision” reveals meaningful insights about “the influence of context on individual experience” and the subjective emotional understandings that individuals attach to lived moments. This is the basis for the pedagogical approach to teaching writing in EFL classrooms that he has developed and termed meaningful literacy. His measurement work in poetry has addressed the poetic genre decisions, voice and poetic interpretation.

Hanauer developed the research method of autoethnographic poetic inquiry in order to explore his own experiences living and growing up as a second-generation Kindertransport survivor. He has used poetic ethnography to explicate the human side of war experiences and promote a pacifist agenda. In 2024, Hanauer produced a Youtube video course, Life Writing and Poetic Autoethnography, consisting of 18 video lectures focused on the methodology and process of poetic autoethnography. In 2025, Hanauer produced another YouTube video course, Linguistic Landscape -- An Autoethnography of Place Course, consisting of eight video lectures and eight video workshops focused on combining the research methodologies of linguistic landscape and autoethnography.

=== Editorial work ===
Hanauer served as editor-in-chief of the journal Scientific Study of Literature for 10 years, the official journal of the International Society for the Empirical Study of Literature, ending his tenure in 2024.

=== Teaching ===
Hanauer has taught research methodology, literacy, and second language learning to undergraduate and graduate students at the university level for over 30 years. His teaching of quantitative research at the doctoral level at Indiana University of Pennsylvania has been influential to a number of students as well as to the fields of applied linguistics, creative writing studies, writing studies, and the scientific study of literature. In 2023, Hanauer produced a video series designed for beginners on statistical analysis and quantitative research using the data analysis program jamovi.

=== Awards and honors ===
In 2015, Hanauer was the recipient of the John R. Hayes Award for Excellence in Writing Research for his article "Measuring voice in poetry written by second language learners" which was first published in 2014 in the journal Written Communication.

== Selected bibliography ==
=== Books ===
- Peskin, J.; Hanauer, D.I. (2023). A life with poetry: the development of poetic literacy. Linguistic approaches to literature. Amsterdam; Philadelphia: John Benjamins publishing company. ISBN 978-90-272-1342-6.
- Curry, M.J.; Hanauer, D.I., eds. (2014). Language, Literacy, and Learning in STEM Education. Language Studies, Science and Engineering. Amsterdam: John Benjamins Publishing Company. ISBN 978-90-272-5750-5.
- Hanauer, D. I.; Englander, Karen (2013). Scientific writing in a second language. Second language writing. Anderson. South Carolina: Parlor Press. ISBN 978-1-60235-380-0.
- Hanauer, D. I. (2010). Poetry as research: exploring second language poetry writing. Linguistic approaches to literature. Amsterdam: J. Benjamins. ISBN 978-90-272-3341-7.
- Hanauer, D.I.; Rivers, Dyanne (2004). Poetry and the meaning of life: reading and writing poetry in language arts classrooms. Pippin teacher's library. Toronto: Pippin Pub. Corp. ISBN 978-0-88751-106-6.

=== Articles and book chapters ===
- Hanauer D. I (2015). "Measuring voice in poetry written by second language learners". Written Communication. 32 (1): 66–86. doi:10.1177/0741088314563023. S2CID 145651255.
- Hanauer, D. I. (2014). Being in the Second Iraq War: A poetic ethnography. Qualitative Inquiry.
- Hanauer D (2013). "Experiencing the Blitz: A poetic representation of a childhood in wartime London". Qualitative Inquiry. 20 (5): 584–599. doi:10.1177/1077800413489536. S2CID 145094536.
- Hanauer D (2012). "Growing up in the unseen shadow of the Kindertransport: A poetic-narrative autoethnography". Qualitative Inquiry. 18 (9): 845–851. doi:10.1177/1077800412456960. S2CID 145606503.
- Hanauer D (2011). "Meaningful literacy: Writing poetry in the language classroom". Language Teaching: Surveys and Studies. 45 (1): 105–115. doi:10.1017/s0261444810000522. S2CID 144810339.
- Hanauer D., Englander K. (2011). "Quantifying the burden of writing research articles in a second language: Data from Mexican scientists". Written Communication. 28 (4): 403–416. doi:10.1177/0741088311420056. S2CID 145725350.
- Hanauer D (2011). "The scientific study of poetic writing". The Scientific Study of Literature. 1 (1): 79–87. doi:10.1075/ssol.1.1.08han.
- Hanauer D (2010). "Laboratory identity: A linguistic landscape analysis of personalized space within a microbiology laboratory". Critical Inquiry in Language Studies. 7 (2): 152–172. doi:10.1080/15427581003757442. S2CID 144459519.
- Hanauer D., Jacobs-Sera D., Pedulla M., Cresawn S., Hendrix R., Hatfull G. (2006). "Teaching scientific inquiry". Science. 314 (5807): 1880–81. doi:10.1126/science.1136796. PMID 17185586. S2CID 142760427.
- Hanauer, D. (2009). Science and the linguistic landscape: A genre analysis of representational wall space within a microbiology laboratory. In: E. Shohamy and D. Gorter (Eds.), Linguistic Landscape: Expanding the Scenery. New York: Routledge, pp. 287–301.
- Hanauer, D. (2008). Non-place identity: Britain’s response to migration in the age of supermodernity. In: G. Delanty, P. Jones and R. Wodak (Eds.), Migrant Voices: Discourses of Belonging and Exclusion. Liverpool: Liverpool University Press, pp. 198–220.
- Newman M., Hanauer D. (2005). "The NCATE/TESOL teacher education standards: A critical review". TESOL Quarterly. 39 (4): 753–763. doi:10.2307/3588536. JSTOR 3588536.
- Hanauer D (2003). "Multicultural moments in Poetry: The importance of the unique". Canadian Modern Language Review. 60 (1): 27–54. doi:10.3138/cmlr.60.1.69.
