= Milette Shamir =

Israeli academic administrator and professor of American studies

- מלאת שמיר
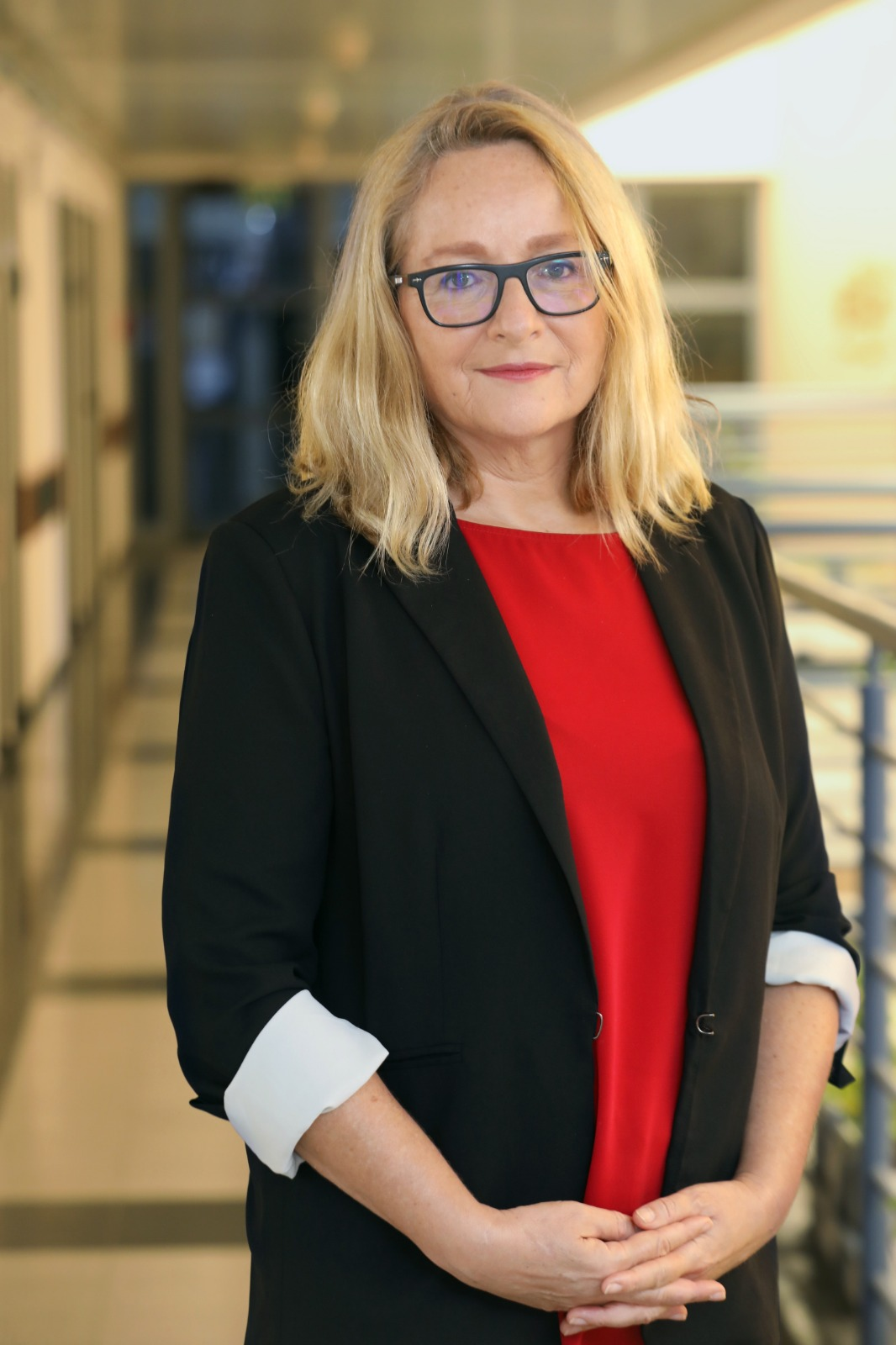
- Shamir in 2020

Academic background
- Education: Brandeis University
- Doctoral advisor: Michael Timo Gilmore

Academic work
- Discipline: American literature and culture
- Institutions: Tel Aviv University

Milette Shamir (Hebrew: מלאת שמיר) is an Israeli academic administrator and professor of American studies serving as vice president of Tel Aviv University.

== Life ==
Shamir completed a Ph.D. at Brandeis University studying under Michael Timo Gilmore and Wai Chee Dimock. Her 1996 dissertation was titled, The Cult of Privacy: Domestic Space and Gender in Antebellum Fiction.

Shamir researches American literature and culture in the nineteenth century. In 2006, she cofounded the American studies program at Tel Aviv University. She served as its head for thirteen years. From 2006 to 2009, she was chair of the department of English and American studies. In 2012, she founded the B.A. in liberal arts, an international student program and served as its academic director until 2016. From 2012 to 2015, Shamir served on the editorial board of American Literature. She and Irene Tucker are the editors-in-chief of Poetics Today. She is the vice president of Tel Aviv University and manages international academic collaborations.

== Selected works ==
- Shamir, Milette; Travis, Jennifer, eds. (2002). Boys Don't Cry?: Rethinking Narratives of Masculinity and Emotion in the U.S. Columbia University Press. ISBN 978-0-231-12034-0.
- Shamir, Milette (2006). Inexpressible Privacy: The Interior Life of Antebellum American Literature. University of Pennsylvania Press. ISBN 978-0-8122-3906-5.
- Shamir, Milette; Zakim, Michael, eds. (2008). Privacy: The History of a Modern Idea. Special Issue of Zmanim (in Hebrew). Open University Press.
- Ryan, Barbara; Shamir, Milette, eds. (2016). Bigger than Ben-Hur: The Book, Its Adaptations, and Their Audiences. Syracuse University Press. ISBN 978-0-8156-3417-1.
