= Willie van Peer =

Belgian Literary Scholar

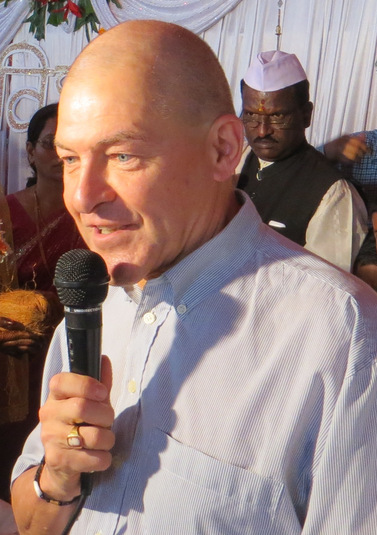
- Peer in 2012
- Born: Joannes van Peer; 1947 (age 78–79); Sint-Lenaarts, Belgium
- Occupations: Professor emeritus in the Faculty of Languages and Literature at LMU Munich in Munich, Germany
- Spouse: Mimi Debruyn

Academic background
- Education: Lancaster University
- Thesis: Stylistics and Psychology. Investigations of Foregrounding (1980) re-edited by Routledge in 2020.
- Doctoral advisor: Geoffrey Leech and Michael Short

Academic work
- Discipline: Literary theory
- Sub-discipline: Empirical study of literature
- Institutions: LMU Munich
- Notable works: Stylistics and Psychology: Investigations of Foregrounding
- Website: https://www.daf.uni-muenchen.de/personen/emeriti/van_peer/index.html

Willie van Peer is professor emeritus in the Faculty of Languages and Literature at Ludwig-Maximilians-Universität München in Munich, Germany. He is a linguist, literary scholar, and one of the founders of the empirical study of literature. Van Peer has published extensively in his main areas of research: foregrounding, narratology, literary evaluation, literary theory, emotion in literature and intimate relations in literature. Van Peer was Vice President of the International Association of Empirical Aesthetics (IAEA, 1996–1998), Chair of the Poetics and Linguistics Association (PALA, 2000–2003) and President of the International Society for the Empirical Study of Literature (IGEL, 2004–2006). He was (co-)editor of the series Linguistic Approaches to Literature (2000–2010) and founding editor of Scientific Study of Literature (2011). Directions in Empirical Literary Studies was published in his honour in 2008.

Van Peer's PhD and the book Stylistics and Psychology. Investigations of Foregrounding (1986) was the first attempt to empirically validate the concept of foregrounding, originally developed by the Russian Formalists and Prague Structuralists.

Van Peer has been Visiting Scholar in the Departments of Comparative Literature at Stanford and at Princeton University, and in the Department of (Cognitive) Psychology at the University of Memphis. He is also a Fellow of Clare Hall of Cambridge University and an Honorary Professor of Borys Grinchenko Kyiv University.

== REDES project ==
The Research for the Development of Empirical Studies project (REDES, 2002–2012) was inaugurated when Willie van Peer and Frank Hakemulder (Utrecht University) were invited to teach a summer course at the Federal University of Rio de Janeiro, Brazil, and came into contact with an on-going project being carried out by Sonia Zyngier following the tenets of critical pedagogy. They invited Anna Chesnokova (then Kyiv National Linguistic University) to join. The central goal of the project was to promote an environment where students could become autonomous researchers through intercultural cooperation over the internet and through face to face events.

For a decade, the REDES international research group investigated culture, literature, language and media from a multicultural perspective.

== Selected works ==
- van Peer, Willie; Hakemulder, Frank; Zyngier, Sonia (2012). Scientific methods for the humanities. John Benjamins Publishing Company. ISBN 978-90-272-3347-9.
- van Peer, Willie (2020). Stylistics and Psychology: Investigations of Foregrounding. Routledge & CRC Press. ISBN 978-0-367-67246-1.
- van Peer, Willie and Anna Chesnokova (2022). Experiencing Poetry: A Guidebook to Psychopoetics. Bloomsbury.
