= Media linguistics =

Media linguistics is the linguistic study of language use in the media. It studies the functioning of language in the media sphere, or modern mass communication presented by print, audiovisual, digital, and networked media. Media linguistics investigates the relationship between language use, which is regarded as an interface between social and cognitive communication practice, and public discourse conveyed through media.

Media linguistics is being formed in the process of the differentiation of linguistics as a general theory of language, and is a sub-field of linguistics similar to other fields such as psycholinguistics, sociolinguistics, developmental linguistics, legal linguistics, political linguistics, etc.

== Definition ==
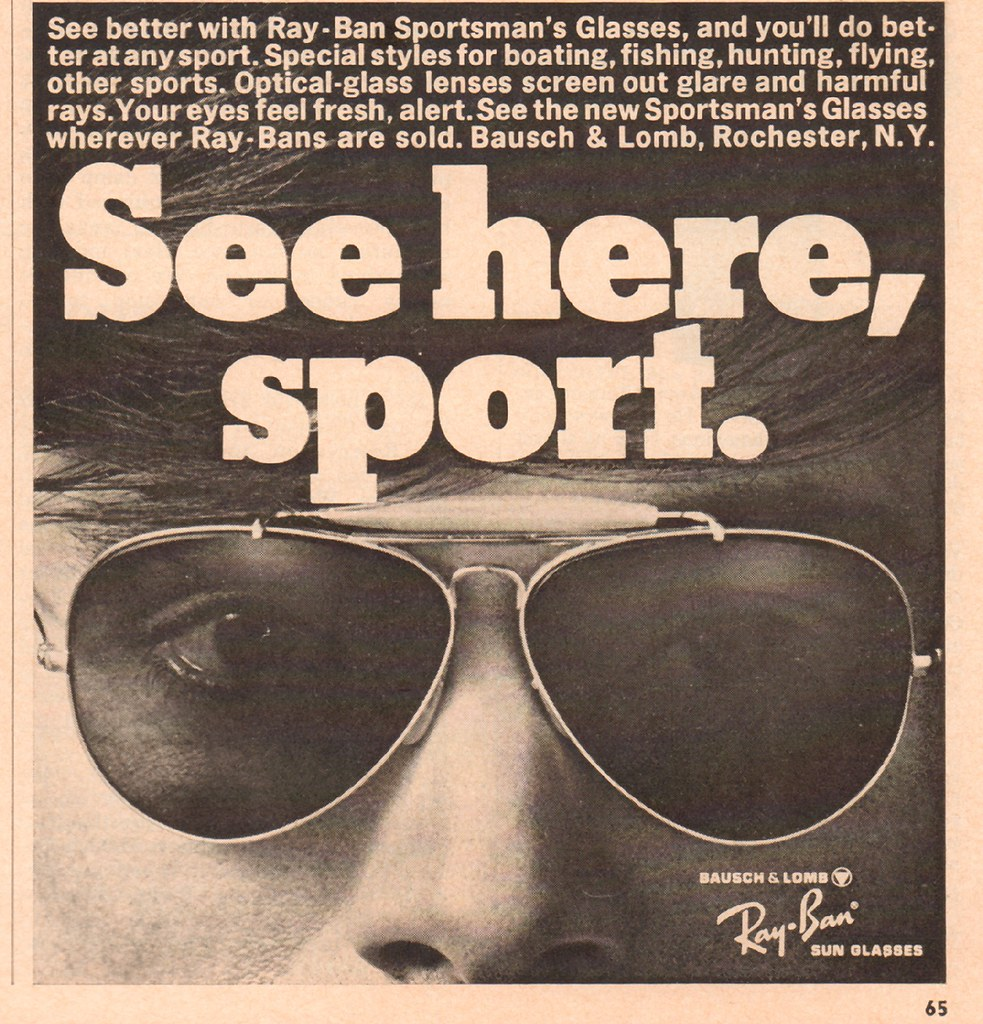
The 1968 Ray-Ban advertisement uses a play on the English word "sport," referring both to a person and the activity.

Modern media linguistics examines not only the written language of media, but also media speech. Media linguistics includes media speech studies that examine (1) the speech behavior of mass communication participants and (2) specific areas, textures, and genres of media texts. Media linguistics analyses texts, as well as their production and reception.

Thus, in principle, media linguistics seeks to explain the particular case of the functioning of language—in mass communication with its complex structure and changing properties—amid the overall trends of language and speech culture. It studies language in relation to medium-specific aspects, such as the specific properties of media texts or platforms, and sometimes includes analysis of multimodality. Other purposes include analyzing patterns of language use within certain historical contexts, and establishing differences between "normal" language and media language. Media linguistics is closely related to contemporary media practices and intends to impact them, in particular, by means of media education. Studying language use in the media can be used to help develop critical media literacy, for example in relation to stereotypes.

Media linguistics includes the study of traditional mass media texts (typically print or broadcast news) as well as social media and other digital media such as blog posts or SMS messages. Advertisements, amongst other multimodal media, are commonly analyzed in the context of media linguistics. The study of fictional film and television has recently emerged as an important area of media linguistics.

In recent years, media linguistics has been influenced by "transnational and translocal" communication and the relationship between a country's culture and its use of language.

== Importance ==
Media linguistics includes the use of the media as a source of both historical and contemporary data for research. It is critical in examining regional language and regional dialect models of media involving the portrayal of society and culture. Media linguistics is crucial for understanding how the media broadcasts language ideologies and is able to strengthen representation of a less common, minority language or maintain representation of a dominant language.

Media language is used in second language courses given its ties to culture and its surrounding context as well as its role in exposing students to native-speaker syntax and vocabulary.

=== Impact ===
The study of media linguistics can address questions surrounding power, resistance, societies and identities. A study conducted by Peng in 2020 utilised online surveys and principal component analysis to analyse the results, subsequently finding "an intertwined relationship in which the effects of media exposure on acceptability judgments are moderated by language attitudes."

== Applications ==
The advent of digital communication technologies from the mid-1990s onwards blurred the boundaries between individual and mass communication.

Since the early 21st century, linguists have been studying how "computer-mediated communication (CMC)" differs from older forms of media communication. While the level of interactivity between readers and writers remains the same, CMC shows increasing evidence of the media attempting to gain more and more of their reader's attention.

The variables that have some of the strongest effect on how language changes over time are the number of speakers of a language and how connected they are to the other speakers. This is especially evident within social media, which has the ability to connect many speakers of the same language. CMC also shows how people might form exclusive "groups" online, and form a sense of relatedness with these groups or other online users.

A technical medium (or device) can have different communication forms, so it is not enough to just study the medium. This is even more apparent with the emergence of new media.

Language and media ideologies intertwine in complex ways. People's ideas about different communicative media and different media functions shape the ways they use these media, similar to how language ideologies impact the way people speak. Some scholars found that the perception of message in new media environments was highly influenced by ideologies surrounding the generic type. For example, text messages from prominent political figures were reconstructed in TV newscasts to be more standard, adult, and official than the original transcripts.

=== Participation frameworks ===
The phrase 'participation framework' originated from Erving Goffman in 1981. With the advent of new media, the interactions that take place in media discourse has changed, and therefore the way we approach media participation framework also has to change.

Traditionally, in written discourse, the participation framework is made up of the author(s), who disseminate their message through the written medium to the reader(s), and their work can be read at any time after publication.

However, at the current stage of media discourse, there are greater levels of intertextuality, with a blurring of lines between spoken and written media. Readers are no longer reading works in protracted isolation, and can send the articles to others or post their own comments, oftentimes also eliciting a response from the journalist.

== Theories ==
=== Hyperreality ===
- Baudrillard's concept of hyperreality is closely linked to his previous idea of Simulacra and Simulation. Hyperreality introduces the concept of blending reality and representation so that there is no clear distinction between the reality and fiction. It is highly used in media representations such as films and movies. Hyperreality builds on the foundation on four historical phase of signs that Simulacra and Simulation has. For example, reality might not be the same in representations as in John Atkinson Grimshaw's paintings of Liverpool and Hull where it portray life to be glamorised and romanticised when it was in fact grim and dull.

=== Binary opposition ===
- Claude Levi Strauss' concept of binary opposition can be used in analysing media language. Binary opposition is the system of language and/or thought which is tied to the concept of two theoretical opposites being strictly defined and they set off against each other. It focuses on the contrast between mutually exclusive terms such as on and off.

=== Multimodality ===
- Multimodality is an inter-disciplinary approach which looks beyond the language aspect of the relationship between communication and representation. Media involves the usage of different modes in its representation. This approach provides different ideas, methodology in approaching the relationship between communication and representation through the collection and analysis of visual, aural, embodied and spatial aspects of interaction and environments.

== In different countries ==
- In English-speaking countries the terms media study and media discourse analysis are used, while interdisciplinary approaches such as critical discourse analysis are often used to study news media. See, for example, Teun A. van Dijk's book News as Discourse. Some scholars have recently started using the term media linguistics, while others prefer the more narrow term media stylistics.
- In German-speaking countries the term Medienlinguistik is used, and the field is regarded as "one of the most dynamic fields of applied linguistics".
- In Russia, active usage of the term Медиалингвистика is associated with the publications of T.G. Dobrosklonskaya, where English media speech is investigated. Russian media linguistics is the successor of different linguistic fields, which were designated as and called "the language of newspaper", "the language of radio", "the language of media".

== Overview of closely related linguistic fields ==
=== Sociolinguistics ===
Sociolinguistics is the study of the relationship between society and language. It is concerned with the reason for speaking differently in different social contexts and the social functions of languages. It also looks into the ways a language is used to convey social meaning. For example, a concept called language choice or diglossia involves two varieties present in a language called "high" and "low" and they are used in different conditions.

Sociolinguistics has 3 main areas of focus. They look at the language use in multilingual speech communities, language variation involving its users and its uses. Language use in multilingual speech communities includes language maintenance and shift. Language variation involving its users includes language changes while language variation involving its uses includes politeness theory.

=== Internet Linguistics ===
Internet linguistics is a field advocated by linguist David Crystal. It is defined as the synchronic analysis of language in all areas of Internet activity, including email, the various kinds of chatroom and games interaction, instant messaging, and Web pages, and including associated areas of computer-mediated communication (CMC), such as SMS messaging (texting).

As David Crystal posits, "Netspeak is more than an aggregate of spoken and written features... it does things that neither of these other mediums do, and must accordingly be seen as a new species of communication". According to Marilyn Deegan, they display fluidity, simultaneity (being available on an indefinite number of machines), and non- degradability in copying. They also transcend the traditional limitations on textual dissemination; and they have permeable boundaries (because of the way one text may be integrated within others or display links to others).

Several of these properties have consequences for language, and these combined with those associated with speech and writing to make Netspeak a genuine 'third medium'.

=== Political Linguistics ===
Political linguistics is an interdisciplinary subject of study that encompasses language, media and politics. Media platforms have played increasingly larger and dominant roles in modern politics with the rapid advancement of technology allowing for greater political discourse.

Language has the ability to shape political reality by influencing thought, guiding public discourse, and subconsciously altering the way people speak and think. The political power of language is apparent in propaganda and linguistic stereotyping, as well as through verbal nuances employed by politicians. However, it is important to realise that one may not always be aware of the extent to which their knowledge and identity have been shaped through language. Mass persuasion also has to be linguistically unobtrusive, because the more subtle the language manipulation appears, the more insidious its effect on an unsuspecting public.

== See also ==
- Media studies
- Media stylistics
