= Ronald Carter (linguist) =

British linguist (1947–2018)

Ronald Allan Carter MBE FRSA AcSS (4 May 1947 – 12 September 2018) was a British linguist.

A native of Leeds, Carter studied English, Russian, and German, as well as comparative literature, at University of Birmingham. He began teaching at the University of Nottingham after completing a doctorate in 1979. Carter was a founding member of the Poetics and Linguistics Association, and later led the group as chairman. He was elected fellow of the Royal Society of Arts in 1995, and granted an equivalent honor by the Academy of Social Sciences in 2002. In 2009, Carter was named a Member of the Order of the British Empire.

Carter died on 12 September 2018 at the age of 71.
