= Don Kuiken =

American psychologist

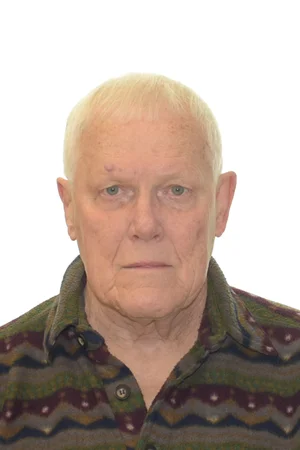
- Education: University of Texas at Austin
- Scientific career
- Fields: Cognitive psychology, Oneirology, Aesthetics, Phenomenological psychology

Donald Kuiken is a Canadian psychologist and scholar known for his interdisciplinary research concerning dreaming, literary reading, aesthetics, and phenomenology. He is currently professor emeritus in the Department of Psychology at the University of Alberta, Edmonton. Kuiken pioneered methods that blend philosophical phenomenology with systematic empirical investigation, significantly influencing research on dreams, reader response, and experiential categories of consciousness.

== Education ==
Kuiken completed his undergraduate studies in psychology at the University of Iowa in 1965, earning a B.A. He went on to pursue graduate studies at the University of Texas at Austin, where he received his Ph.D. in Social Psychology in 1970. During his doctoral training, Kuiken was influenced by mentors such as Sigmund Koch and Michael Polanyi, who were critical of the prevailing neo-positivist approaches in psychology.

== Academic career ==
Kuiken joined the University of Alberta Department of Psychology in 1969, where he spent his entire academic career until becoming professor emeritus in 2017. He held positions ranging from assistant professor to full professor and played a role in the department’s Centre for Advanced Study in Theoretical Psychology including as Director from 1987 to 1990.

== Research ==
Kuiken’s interdisciplinary research integrates phenomenological psychology with systematic empirical methods within two primary domains: dreaming and literary reading. His work emphasizes how lived experiences whether in dreams or reading can lead to changes in self‑perception, expressive reflection, and metaphoric cognition. To facilitate this work, he and collaborators developed numerically‑aided phenomenology, a methodological approach that combines qualitative sensitivity with systematic categorization of experiential narratives.

The Epistemic Limits of Impactful Dreams (2024)

In his 2024 article, The Epistemic Limits of Impactful Dreams: Metacognition, Metaphoricity, and Sublime Feeling, Kuiken presents what may be regarded as the culmination of decades of research into dreams, consciousness, and transformative experience. The paper examines a particular class of dreams that continue to exert psychological influence long after waking. Rather than treating dreams merely as reflections of memory consolidation or unconscious wish fulfillment, Kuiken investigates how certain dreams become enduring sources of reflection, self-examination, and existential questioning. He is especially interested in why some dreams leave individuals with a powerful sense that they have discovered something profound, even when they struggle to articulate exactly what has been learned.

Kuiken distinguishes between nightmares, existential dreams, and transcendent dreams. Nightmares are primarily characterized by fear, distress, and threat-related imagery, often provoking emotional aftereffects that persist into waking life. Existential dreams, by contrast, confront dreamers with fundamental questions about identity, mortality, meaning, and personal transformation. Transcendent dreams go a step further by evoking experiences of awe, unity, mystery, or connection to realities that seem to exceed ordinary understanding. Although these dream types differ in content and emotional tone, Kuiken argues that existential and transcendent dreams share a distinctive cognitive structure that contributes to their lasting impact.

Numerically Aided Phenomenology

A major strand of Kuiken's ongoing work is the development of Numerically Aided Phenomenology (NAP), a methodological framework designed to bridge qualitative and quantitative approaches to psychological research. Traditional phenomenology seeks to describe lived experience as faithfully as possible, while quantitative psychology typically relies on measurement and statistical analysis. Kuiken's innovation lies in demonstrating that these approaches need not be opposed. Through NAP, researchers identify recurring experiential patterns using phenomenological descriptions and then employ systematic numerical procedures to validate and refine those patterns.

The broader significance of this work lies in its challenge to the assumption that subjective experience cannot be studied scientifically. Kuiken argues that rigorous investigation of lived experience requires methods capable of preserving its complexity while also generating reliable empirical findings. His work has therefore become influential within qualitative psychology, consciousness studies, and mixed-methods research, offering a model for investigating phenomena that are difficult to capture through conventional experimental designs alone.

=== Dreaming and impactful dreams ===
A central focus of Kuiken’s work has been impactful dreams, that influence thoughts and feelings after awakening. He and colleagues empirically differentiated dream types, including nightmares, existential dreams, and transcendent dreams, showing how these can deepen self‑perception and affective insight. His research has explored the role of physiological correlates, metaphoric processes, and self‑reflection in dream experience. In recent years, Kuiken has published theoretical and empirical work on the metacognitive and metaphoric aspects of impactful dreams, including how such dreams produce sublime feeling through metaphoric transformation and expressive reflection.

=== Literary reading and aesthetics ===
Kuiken also conducted influential research on literary reading, especially concerning how deeply engaged reading prompts changes in self‑understanding and feeling expression. His collaborations with scholars like David Miall and Shelley Sikora yielded insights into reader response, expressive enactment, and the interplay between textual structure (e.g., foregrounding) and reader cognition. Work includes empirical studies of absorption, self‑implication, and emotional engagement during literary reading.

== Scholarly legacy ==
Kuiken's scholarly legacy lies in his sustained effort to develop a psychology that takes subjective experience seriously without abandoning empirical rigor. Across phenomenology, literary studies, and dream research, he has consistently focused on experiences that transform individuals' ways of understanding themselves and the world. His work challenges the view that psychology should be limited to observable behavior or measurable cognition, arguing instead that the deepest dimensions of human experience can be investigated systematically and scientifically.

== Other works ==
Kuiken has served as editor of Dreaming, the Journal of the International Association for the Study of Dreams, and as associate editor of Scientific Study of Literature. He has also served as president of the International Society for the Empirical Study of Literature (IGEL). His professional activities include invited lectures and collaborations with international research centres, such as the Centre for Subjectivity Research at the University of Copenhagen and the Interacting Minds Centre at Aarhus University.

== Selected publications ==
=== Dreams, Consciousness, and Phenomenological Psychology ===
- Kuiken, Don (2024-05-22). "The Epistemic Limits of Impactful Dreams: Metacognition, Metaphoricity, and Sublime Feeling". Brain Sciences. 14 (6): 528. doi:10.3390/brainsci14060528. ISSN 2076-3425. PMC 11202295. PMID 38928529.
- Kuiken, Don; Lee, Ming-Ni; Northcott, Peyton (2023). "Predicting impactful dreams: The contributions of absence-related melancholy and absence-related depression". Dreaming. 33 (2): 164–186. doi:10.1037/drm0000234. ISSN 1573-3351.
- Kuiken, Don; Porthukaran, Alex; Albrecht, Kelly-Ann; Douglas, Shawn; Cook, Megan (2018). "Metaphoric and associative aftereffects of impactful dreams". Dreaming. 28 (1): 59–83. doi:10.1037/drm0000067. ISSN 1573-3351.
- Kuiken, Don. "The Contrasting Effects of Nightmares, Existential Dreams, and Transcendent Dreams". Taylor & Francis: Routledge.

=== Literary Reading and Aesthetic Experience ===
- Kuiken, Don (2022), "14 Expressive Challenge and the Metaphoricity of Literary Reading", in Willemsen, Steven; Kiss, Miklós (eds.), Puzzling Stories, Berghahn Books, pp. 326–354, doi:10.1515/9781800735927-016, ISBN 978-1-80073-592-7
- Kuiken, Don; Douglas, Shawn (2018). "Living metaphor as the site of bidirectional literary engagement". Scientific Study of Literature. 8 (1): 47–76. doi:10.1075/ssol.18004.kui. ISSN 2210-4372.
- Kuiken, Don; Douglas, Shawn; Kuijpers, Moniek (2021-12-31). "Openness to experience, absorption-like states, and the aesthetic, explanatory, and pragmatic effects of literary reading". Scientific Study of Literature. 11 (2): 148–195. doi:10.1075/ssol.21007.kui. ISSN 2210-4372.
- Kuiken, Donald; Jacobs, Arthur M., eds. (2021). Handbook of Empirical Literary Studies. De Gruyter. doi:10.1515/9783110645958. ISBN 978-3-11-064595-8.
- Sikora, Shelley; Kuiken, Don; Miall, David S. (2011). "Expressive reading: A phenomenological study of readers' experience of Coleridge's The rime of the ancient mariner". Psychology of Aesthetics, Creativity, and the Arts. 5 (3): 258–268. doi:10.1037/a0021999. ISSN 1931-390X.

=== Phenomenological Methodology ===
- Kuiken, D. (2001). "Empirical Phenomenology: Articulating Different Types of Reading Experience.". In Billington, J. (ed.). Reading and mental health (PDF). Palgrave Macmillan. pp. 280–292.
- Kuiken, Don; Schopflocher, Don; Wild, T. Cameron (1989). "Numerically Aided Methods in Phenomenology: A Demonstration". The Journal of Mind and Behavior. 10 (4): 373–392. ISSN 0271-0137. JSTOR 43853473.

=== Edited Volumes ===
- Kuiken, Donald; Jacobs, Arthur M., eds. (2021-09-03). Handbook of Empirical Literary Studies. De Gruyter. doi:10.1515/9783110645958. ISBN 978-3-11-064595-8.
