= Scientific Study of Literature =

- Discipline: Poetics
- Language: English
- Edited by: David Ian Hanauer

Publication details
- History: 2011-present
- Publisher: John Benjamins Publishing Company
- Frequency: Biannual

Standard abbreviations
- ISO 4: Sci. Study Lit.

Indexing
- ISSN: 2210-4372 (print); 2210-4380 (web)
- OCLC no.: 864916862

Links
- Journal homepage; Online archive

Scientific Study of Literature is a biannual peer-reviewed academic journal published by John Benjamins Publishing Company since 2011. It covers research in literary study. The editor-in-chief is Moniek Kuijpers (2025-present). David Ian Hanauer (Indiana University of Pennsylvania), previously served in this role from 2014 to 2024. The founding editor and editor-in-chief from 2011 to 2013 was Willie van Peer (LMU Munich). It is the official journal of the International Society for the Empirical Study of Literature, with membership including a subscription. The concept of the journal is discussed, because of its programmatic title, which suggests to bridge the common antagonism between sciences and literary study.

== Abstracting and indexing ==
The journal is abstracted and indexed in International Bibliography of Periodical Literature, European Reference Index for the Humanities ERIH PLUS, Linguistics and Language Behaviour Abstracts, and MLA Bibliography.

== See also ==
• Poetics Today
