= Poetics and Linguistics Association =

The Poetics and Linguistics Association is an international academic association which exists to promote the research, teaching and learning in the study of linguistic style and the language of literature. The Poetics and Linguistics Association is usually known by the acronym PALA. The main activities of PALA are the publication of the journal Language and Literature, and an annual conference.

== History ==
PALA was founded in 1980 by a group of scholars who were interested in the language of literature, and who did not feel that the forums that were available to them at the time were adequate for productive academic discussion. Among the founding, or early, members were Ron Carter, Roger Fowler, Geoffrey Leech, Michael Short, Katie Wales, Michael Toolan, Paul Simpson, and Peter Verdonk.

To celebrate its Silver Jubilee in 2005, PALA held a poll of its members to award a prize to ‘the most influential book in stylistics’ to be published in its 25-year history. The prize was awarded to Style in Fiction by Geoffrey Leech and Mick Short, originally published by Longman in 1981, and a special symposium, hosted by the two authors, was held in Lancaster in March 2006.

== Organisation ==
PALA is run by a committee which is elected by the membership. An Annual General Meeting is held each year at the annual conference, and is the ultimate decision-making body of the association. The current chair is Daniela Francesca Virdis, University of Cagliari.

Former chairs of PALA are (most recent first):

- Stephen Pihlaja
- Marina Lambrou
- Michael Toolan
- Paul Simpson
- Michael Burke
- Lesley Jeffries
- Isil Bas
- Willie van Peer
- Tony Bex
- Katie Wales
- Mick Short
- Ron Carter
- Vimala Herman
- Roger Fowler

== Journal ==
Language and Literature is a peer-reviewed, international, academic journal covering the latest developments in stylistic analysis, the linguistic analysis of literature and related areas. Topics covered include: literary and non-literary stylistics, the connection between stylistics, critical theory, linguistics and literary criticism, and their applications in teaching to native and non-native speaking students. Language and Literature is published by Sage, and the current editor is Rocio Montoro of the University of Granada.

== Annual conference ==
PALA holds an annual conference each year.

=== Past conferences ===
Meetings and conferences have been held since 1980. In recent years the major annual conference has taken place at the following venues:

- 1995: University of Granada, Spain
- 1996: Queen's University, Belfast
- 1997: Nottingham (organised by University of Central England and Wolverhampton University)
- 1998: Bern, Switzerland
- 1999: Potchefstroom, South Africa
- 2000: Goldsmiths College, London
- 2001: Budapest, Hungary
- 2002: University of Birmingham, UK
- 2003: Bogazici University, Istanbul
- 2004: New York University
- 2005: Huddersfield University, UK
- 2006: Joensuu, Finland
- 2007: Kansai Gaidai University, Japan
- 2008: University of Sheffield
- 2009: Roosevelt Academy, Middelburg, the Netherlands
- 2010: Genova, Italy.
- 2011: University of Namibia
- 2012: University of Malta
- 2013: University of Heidelberg
- 2014: University of Maribor
- 2015: University of Kent
- 2016: Universita di Cagliari
- 2017: West Chester University
- 2018: University of Birmingham
- 2019: University of Liverpool
- 2021: University of Nottingham (online)
- 2022: Aix-Marseille Université
- 2023: Bertinoro University
- 2024: Sheffield Hallam University
- 2025: Aston University

=== Future conferences ===
- 2026: Uppsala University
