= International Journal of Corpus Linguistics =

- Discipline: Linguistics
- Language: English
- Edited by: Michaela Mahlberg

Publication details
- History: 1995–present
- Publisher: John Benjamins Publishing Company
- Frequency: Quarterly
- Impact factor: 0.976 (2018)

Standard abbreviations
- ISO 4: Int. J. Corpus Linguist.

Indexing
- ISSN: 1569-9811

Links
- Journal homepage

The International Journal of Corpus Linguistics is a quarterly peer-reviewed academic journal that publishes scholarly articles and book reviews on corpus linguistics, with a focus on applied linguistics. The journal is published by John Benjamins Publishing Company. The current editor-in-chief is Michaela Mahlberg (University of Birmingham). According to the Journal Citation Reports, the journal has a 2018 impact factor of 0.976.
