= Literature review =

Review of the current knowledge of a particular topic

A literature review is a critical overview and synthesis of previously published research on a particular topic or within specific field of knowledge. It shows current state of thinking on the topic, how knowledge in the field has evolved, and what is generally accepted, and which questions or areas remain insufficiently explored.

The term can refer to a full scholarly paper or a section of a scholarly work such as books or articles. Either way, a literature review provides the researcher/author and the audiences with general information of an existing knowledge of a particular topic. A good literature review has a proper research question, a proper theoretical framework, and/or a chosen research method. It serves to situate the current study within the body of the relevant literature and provides context for the reader. In such cases, the review usually precedes the methodology and results sections of the work. Producing a literature review is often part of a graduate and post-graduate requirement, included in the preparation of a thesis, dissertation, or a journal article. Literature reviews are also common in a research proposal or prospectus (the document approved before a student formally begins a dissertation or thesis).

== Types ==
Since the concept of a systematic review was formalized in the 1970s, a basic division among types of reviews is the dichotomy of narrative reviews versus systematic reviews. The main types of narrative reviews are evaluative, exploratory, and instrumental.

A fourth type of review of literature (the scientific literature) is the systematic review but it is not called a literature review, which absent further specification, conventionally refers to narrative reviews. A systematic review focuses on a specific research question to identify, appraise, select, and synthesize all high-quality research evidence and arguments relevant to that question. A meta-analysis is typically a systematic review using statistical methods to effectively combine the data used on all selected studies to produce a more reliable result.

Torraco (2016) describes an integrative literature review. The purpose of an integrative literature review is to generate new knowledge on a topic through the process of review, critique, and synthesis of the literature under investigation.

George et al (2023) offer an extensive overview of review approaches. They also propose a model for selecting an approach by looking at the purpose, object, subject, community, and practices of the review. They describe six different types of review, each with their own unique purposes:

1. Exploratory or scoping reviews focus on breadth as opposed to depth
2. Systematic or integrative reviews integrate empirical studies on a topic
3. Meta-narrative reviews are qualitative and use literature to compare research or practice communities
4. Problematizing or critical reviews propose new perspectives on a concept by association with other literature
5. Meta-analyses and meta-regressions integrate quantitative studies and identify moderators
6. Mixed research syntheses combine other review approaches in the same paper

== Process and product ==
Shields and Rangarajan (2013) distinguish between the process of reviewing the literature and a finished work or product known as a literature review. The process of reviewing the literature is often ongoing and informs many aspects of the empirical research project.

The process of reviewing the literature requires different kinds of activities and ways of thinking. Shields and Rangarajan (2013) and Granello (2001) link the activities of doing a literature review with Benjamin Bloom's revised taxonomy of the cognitive domain (ways of thinking: remembering, understanding, applying, analyzing, evaluating, and creating).

=== Use of artificial intelligence in a literature review ===
Artificial intelligence (AI) is reshaping traditional literature reviews across various disciplines. Generative pre-trained transformers, such as ChatGPT, are often used by students and academics for review purposes. Since 2023, an increasing number of tools powered by large language models and other artificial intelligence technologies have been developed to assist, automate, or generate literature reviews. Nevertheless, the employment of ChatGPT in academic reviews is problematic due to ChatGPT's propensity to "hallucinate". In response, efforts are being made to mitigate these hallucinations through the integration of plugins. For instance, Rad et al. (2023) used ScholarAI for review in cardiothoracic surgery.

== See also ==
- Empirical study of literature
- Living review
- Media monitoring
- Review journal
