= Foregrounding =

Concept in literary studies

Foregrounding is a concept in literary studies that concerns making a linguistic utterance (word, clause, phrase, phoneme, etc.) stand out from the surrounding linguistic context, from given literary traditions, or from more urban knowledge. It is "the 'throwing into relief' of the linguistic sign against the background of the norms of ordinary language." There are two main types of foregrounding: parallelism and deviation. Parallelism can be described as unexpected regularity, while deviation can be seen as unexpected irregularity. As the definition of foregrounding indicates, these are relative concepts. Something can only be unexpectedly regular or irregular within a particular context. This context can be relatively narrow, such as the immediate textual surroundings (referred to as a 'secondary norm'), or wider such as an entire genre (referred to as a 'primary norm'). Foregrounding can occur on all levels of language (phonology, graphology, morphology, lexis, syntax, semantics, and pragmatics). It is generally used to highlight important parts of a text, aid memorability, and/or invite interpretation.

== Origin ==
The term originated in English through the translation by Paul Garvin of the Czech aktualisace (literally "to actualize"), borrowing the terms from Jan Mukařovský of the Prague school of the 1930s. The Prague Structuralists' work was a continuation of the ideas generated by the Russian Formalists, particularly their notion of Defamiliarization ('ostranenie'). Especially the 1917 essay 'Art as Technique' (Iskusstvo kak priem) by Viktor Shklovsky proved to be highly influential in laying the basis of an anthropological theory of literature. To quote from his essay: "And art exists that one may recover the sensation of life; it exists to make one feel things, to make the stone stony. The purpose of art is to impart the sensation of things as they are perceived and not as they are known. The technique of art is to make objects "unfamiliar," to make forms difficult, to increase the difficulty and length of perception because the process of perception is an aesthetic end in itself and must be prolonged." It took several decades before the Russian Formalists' work was discovered in the West, but in 1960 some British stylisticians, notably Geoffrey Leech and Roger Fowler, established the notion of 'foregrounding' in the linguistically oriented analysis of literature. Soon a plethora of studies investigated foregrounding features in a multitude of texts, demonstrating its ubiquity in a large variety of literary traditions. These analyses were seen as evidence that there was a special literary register, which was called, also after the Russian Formalists, 'literariness' (literaturnost').

== Evidence Supporting Foregrounding Theory ==
The attempt to support foregrounding theory, based on real reader responses, started with Willie Van Peer in 1986, and since then, many studies have validated foregrounding theory's predictions. In 1994 Miall and Kuiken had participants read three short stories one sentence after the other – and rank each sentence for strikingness and affect. Sentences that had more foregrounding devices were found to be judged by readers as more striking, more emotional, and they also led to slower reading times. These findings were independent of the reader's previous experience with reading literature, but other experiments found foregrounding effects that seem to be connected to experience. Some evidence suggests there is a difference between experienced and inexperienced readers in second readings of a literary text that is rich with foregrounding devices: For experienced readers there is an improvement in evaluation between first and second readings. This effect was initially found by Dixon, Bortolussi, Twilley and Leung in 1993 for the story Emma Zunz by Jorge Luis Borges, and was later found by Hakemulder and his colleagues for other texts as well. However, recent replication attempts by Kuijpers and Hakemulder did not get the same results. They found that the main reason for an improvement in evaluation between readings was a better understanding of the story. Another line of research suggests that experience affects the reader tendency to engage foregrounding. In an experiment that combines eye tracking and retrospective think aloud interviews Harash found that when inexperienced readers encounter a challenging stylistic device they are more prone to use shallow processing and not to start a foregrounding process, and that experienced readers have a higher tendency both to start a foregrounding process and to finish it successfully. Foregrounding also appears to play some role in increasing empathic understanding for people in similar situations as the characters in a story they just read. Koopman gave subjects to read 1 of 3 versions of an excerpt from a literary novel about the loss of a child, the original version, a manipulated version "without imagery" and a version "without foregrounding." Results showed that readers who had read the "original" version showed higher empathy for people who are grieving than those who had read the version "without foregrounding."

== Example ==
For example, the last line of a poem with a consistent metre may be foregrounded by changing the number of syllables it contains. This would be an example of a deviation from a secondary norm. In the following poem by E. E. Cummings, there are two types of deviation:

light's lives lurch

a once world quickly from rises

army the gradual of unbeing fro

on stiffening greenly air and to ghosts go

drift slippery hands tease slim float twitter faces

Only stand with me, love! against these its

until you are, and until i am dreams...

Firstly, most of the poem deviates from 'normal' language (primary deviation). In addition, there is secondary deviation in that the penultimate line is unexpectedly different from the rest of the poem. Nursery rhymes, adverts and slogans often exhibit parallelism in the form of repetition and rhyme, but parallelism can also occur over longer texts. For example, jokes are often built on a mixture of parallelism and deviation. They often consist of three parts or characters. The first two are very similar (parallelism) and the third one starts out as similar, but our expectations are thwarted when it turns out different in end (deviation).

== See also ==
- Defamiliarization
- Glossary of rhetorical terms
- Rhetorical device
- Stylistics (linguistics)
- Effects of foregrounding - research coalition
