= Language and Literature =

- Discipline: Humanities
- Language: English
- Edited by: Dan McIntyre

Publication details
- History: 1992-present
- Publisher: SAGE Publications (United Kingdom)
- Frequency: Quarterly
- Impact factor: 0.692 (2018)

Standard abbreviations
- ISO 4: Lang. Lit.

Indexing
- ISSN: 0963-9470 (print); 1461-7293 (web)
- LCCN: 97660613
- OCLC no.: 260155706

Links
- Journal homepage; Online access; Online archive

Language and Literature is a peer-reviewed academic journal covering the field of stylistics. The journal's editor is Dan McIntyre (University of Huddersfield). The journal has been published since 1992. It was first publishes by Longman and is now published by SAGE Publications in association with the Poetics and Linguistics Association.

== Scope ==
Language and Literature covers the latest developments in the theory and practice of stylistics, the linguistic analysis of style in language (particularly in literary texts). It has a broad coverage and offers easy access to cutting-edge research in the field.

== Abstracting and indexing ==
Language and Literature is abstracted and indexed in, among other databases, SCOPUS, and the Social Sciences Citation Index. According to the Journal Citation Reports, its 2018 impact factor is 0.692, ranking it 114 out of 184 journals in the category ‘Linguistics’.

== Editorial team ==
- Dan McIntyre (editor)
- Rocío Montoro (assistant editor)
- Violeta Sotirova (assistant editor)
- Sandrine Sorlin (assistant editor)
- Simon Statham (reviews editor)

== Previous editors ==
- Geoff Hall (2010–2016)
- Paul Simpson (2004–2009)
- Katie Wales (1997–2003)
- Mick Short (1992–1996)

== History ==
The journal was originally called Parlance and was an in-house publication of the Poetics and Linguistics Association. Parlance was edited by Mick Short and produced at Lancaster University. Between 1988 and 1992, eight issues were published. In 1992 the journal was contracted to Longman and its name changed to Language and Literature. When Longman relinquished its journal activities in 1996, the journal was contracted to SAGE Publications. The name Parlance was revived in 2004 as the title of the newsletter of the Poetics and Linguistics Association.
