= Michael Short (linguist) =

British linguist

Michael Henry Short
- Born: 11 December 1945 (age 80); Lancaster, United Kingdom
- Known for: Stylistics

Academic background
- Education: University of Birmingham; Lancaster University

Academic work
- Discipline: Linguist
- Sub-discipline: Stylistics
- Institutions: Lancaster University
- Website: Short on the website of Lancaster University

Michael Henry 'Mick' Short (born 1945) is a British linguist. He is currently an honorary professor at the Department of Linguistics and English Language of Lancaster University, United Kingdom. His research focuses on applied linguistics with a special focus on stylistics.

== Career ==
In 1979 he founded the Poetics and Linguistics Association where he and acted as the treasurer from 1979 to 1982, and later served on the committee. The association started a journal, Parlance, at his instigation, and it was produced at Department of Linguistics and English Language, Lancaster University between 1988 and 1991.

In 1985, Short co-founded the journal Language and Literature.

In 2006 he organised the Style in Fiction Symposium in Lancaster.

== Awards ==
In 2000 Short was awarded with the National Teaching Fellowship.

In 2005 Short and Geoffrey Leech's book Style in Fiction was awarded the PALA 25th anniversary Book Prize as the most influential book in the field of stylistics.

== Publications ==
Short has publications in several major journals such as Applied Linguistics, The Journal of Literary Semantics, Language and Literature, Language and Style, Narrative, Poetics, Style, and Text.

Short's most famous publication is entitled Style in Fiction, co-authored with Geoffrey Leech. The book was first published in 1981 and has sold more than 30,000 copies worldwide.

In 1995, Short began compiling the research and notes made by Paul Werth, a text linguist who had been developing his text world theory before his death in that same year. Werth's monograph, Text Worlds: Representing Conceptual Space, was edited and completed by Short between 1995 and 1998, before being published in 1999.

== Bibliography ==
=== Books ===
- Culpeper, J., Short, M., Verdonk, P., Culpeper, J. (Ed.), Short, M. (Ed.), & Verdonk, P. (Ed.) (1998). Exploring the language of drama : from text to context. London: Routledge.
- Semino, E., & Short, M. H. (2004). Corpus stylistics: speech, writing and thought presentation in a corpus of English writing. London: Routledge.
- Leech, G., & Short, M. (2007). Style in fiction : a linguistic introduction to English fictional prose. (English language series). Harlow: Pearson Longman.

=== Articles ===
- Heywood, J., Semino, E., & Short, M. H. (2002). "Linguistic metaphor identification in two extracts from novels". Language and Literature, 11(1), 35–54.
- Short, M. H., Halász, L., & Varga, A. (2002). "A cross-cultural study of fictional and non-fictional text understanding". Poetics, 30(3), 195–219. doi:
- Short, MH & Archer, D 2003, "Designing a world-wide web-based stylistics course and investigating its effectiveness". Style, vol. 37, no. 1, pp. 27–64.
- Semino, E., Heywood, J., & Short, M. H. (2004). "Methodological problems in the analysis of a corpus of conversations about cancer". Journal of Pragmatics, 36(7), 1271–1294. doi:
- McIntyre, D., Bellard-Thomson, C., Heywood, J., McEnery, A. M., Semino, E., & Short, M. H. (2004). "Investigating the presentation of speech, writing and thought in British English : a corpus-based approach". ICAME Journal, 28, 49–76.
- Short, M. H., Busse, B., & Plummer, P. (2006). "Afterword". Language and Literature, 15(3), 321–322.
- Short, M. H., Busse, B., & Plummer, P. (2006). "Preface: The web-based Language and Style Course, E-learning and Stylistics". Language and Literature, 15(3), 219–233.
- Short, M. H. (2006). "E-learning and Language and Style in Lancaster". Language and Literature, 15(3), 234–256. doi:
