= Linda Flower =

Linda Flower (born March 3, 1944, in Wichita) is a composition theorist. She is best known for her emphasis on cognitive rhetoric, but has more recently published in the field of service learning. Flower is currently professor emerita of rhetoric at Carnegie Mellon University.

== Biography ==
Flower graduated with a doctorate degree from Rutgers University. Her dissertation was on Charles Dickens. Teaching professional writing to business students at Carnegie Mellon University inspired Flower to study more about problem-solving. While studying linguistics, rhetoric, and psycholinguistics, Flower connected with John Richard Hayes, a cognitive psychologist also working at Carnegie Mellon. Flower and Hayes became frequent collaborators. They used think-aloud protocols to learn more about how writers problem-solve during writing tasks. Together, they developed a cognitive model of the writing process. This model prompted discussions of cognitive rhetoric and its role with social constructivism and meaning making processes, including critiques from Patricia Bizzell and Martin Nystrand.

Flower went on to serve in multiple roles promoting the study of writing. She served as co-director of the Center for the Study of Writing at the Carnegie Mellon. She also served on the Making Thinking Visible Project and developed Pittsburgh's Community Literacy Center.

From 1996 to 2002, Flower also served as Director of the Center for University Outreach at Carnegie Mellon University.

Flower's work with the Community Literacy Center and her research into community literacy has earned her acclaim in the field of rhetoric and composition. In 2009, Flower earned the Rhetoric Society of America's Book Award for Community Literacy and the Rhetoric of Public Engagement. This book award recognizes "the best work in any branch of rhetorical study in a given year."

== Works ==
=== Independent works ===
- "Writer-Based Prose: A Cognitive Basis for Problems in Writing" College English, Vol. 41, No. 1. (September 1979), pp. 19–37.
- "The Construction of Purpose in Writing and Reading" College English, Vol. 50, No. 5. (September 1988), pp. 528–550.
- "Cognition, Context, and Theory Building" College Composition and Communication, Vol. 40, No. 3. (October 1989), pp. 282–311.
- "Intercultural Inquiry and the Transformation of Service" College English, Vol. 65, No. 2. (November 2002), pp. 181–201.
- Problem-Solving Strategies for Writing
- The Construction of Negotiated Meaning: A Social Cognitive Theory of Writing
- Community Literacy and the Rhetoric of Public Engagement (2008)
- "Difference-driven Inquiry: A Working Theory of Local Public Deliberation." Rhetoric Society Quarterly, vol. 46, no. 4, 2016, pp. 308–330.

=== Collaborative works ===
- Linda S. Flower; John R. Hayes. "Problem-Solving Strategies and the Writing Process" College English, Vol. 39, No. 4, Stimulating Invention in Composition Courses. (December 1977), pp. 449–461.
- Linda Flower; John R. Hayes. "The Cognition of Discovery: Defining a Rhetorical Problem" College Composition and Communication, Vol. 31, No. 1. (February 1980), pp. 21–32.
- Linda Flower; John R. Hayes. "A Cognitive Process Theory of Writing" College Composition and Communication, Vol. 32, No. 4. (December 1981), pp. 365–387.
- Irvin Y. Hashimoto; Linda S. Flower. "Bait/Rebait: Teachers Should not Spend Class Time Teaching Students How to Understand Their Audience" The English Journal, Vol. 72, No. 1. (January 1983), pp. 14–17.
- Linda Flower; John R. Hayes; Linda Carey; Karen Schriver; James Stratman. "Detection, Diagnosis, and the Strategies of Revision" College Composition and Communication, Vol. 37, No. 1. (February 1986), pp. 16–55.
- Christina Haas; Linda Flower. "Rhetorical Reading Strategies and the Construction of Meaning" College Composition and Communication, Vol. 39, No. 2. (May 1988), pp. 167–183.
- "Karen Schriver; Linda Flower; John Schilb. "Three Comments on 'Rhetoric and Ideology in the Writing Class' and 'Problem Solving Reconsidered'" College English, Vol. 51, No. 7. (November 1989), pp. 764–770.
- Linda Flower; Victoria Stein; John Ackerman; Margaret J. Kantz; Kathleen McCormick; Wayne C. Peck. Reading-to-Write: Exploring a Cognitive and Social Process (1990), New York: Oxford University Press
- Wayne Campbell Peck; Linda Flower; Lorraine Higgins. "Community Literacy" College Composition and Communication, Vol. 46, No. 2. (May 1995), pp. 199–222.
- Kathleen McCormick; Gary Waller; Linda Flower. Reading Texts: Reading, Responding, Writing
- Linda Flower; Elenore Long; Lorraine Higgins Learning to Rival: A Literate Practice for Intercultural Inquiry. (2000)
