= Empirical study of literature =

Study of the psychological, sociological, and philosophical aspect of texts

The empirical study of literature is an interdisciplinary field of research which includes the psychology, sociology, and philosophy of texts, the contextual study of literature, and the history of reading literary texts.

The International Society for the Empirical Study of Literature and Media (IGEL) is one learned association which brings together experts in this field. Major journals in the field are Poetics: Journal of Empirical Research on Culture, the Media and the Arts, Poetics Today: International Journal for Theory and Analysis of Literature and Communication, and Scientific Study of Literature.

The empirical study of literature attracts scholarship particularly in the areas of reception and audience studies and in cognitive psychology when it is concerned with questions of reading. In these two areas research and studies based on the framework are steadily growing. Further fields where the framework in various revised and expanded versions attracts scholarship is (comparative) cultural studies and pedagogy.

== Bibliographies ==
- Lisiak, Agata Anna, and Steven Tötösy de Zepetnek. "Bibliography of Siegfried J. Schmidt's Publications." CLCWeb: Comparative Literature and Culture 12.1 (2010)
- Tötösy de Zepetnek, Steven. "Bibliography of Contextual (Systemic and Empirical) Approaches in the Study of Literature and Culture (to 1998)." CLCWeb: Comparative Literature and Culture 3.3 (2001)
