= Political linguistics =

Study of the relations between language and politics

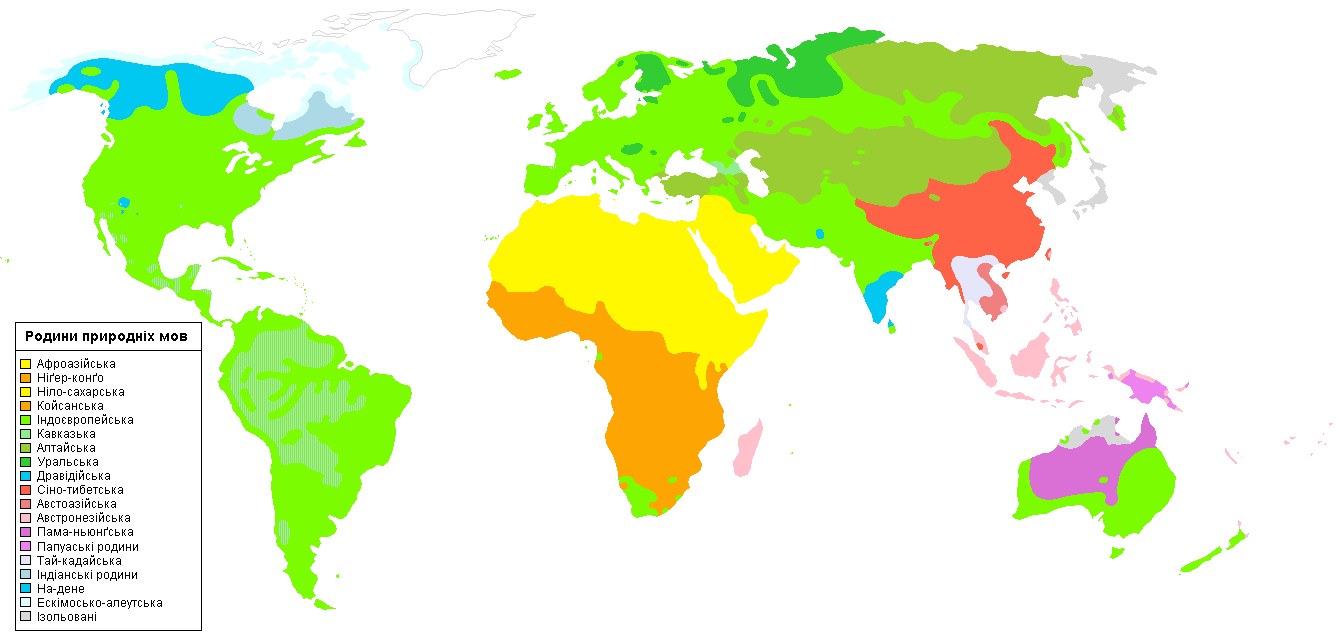
Human language families

Political linguistics is the study of the relations between language and politics. It argues that language gives origin to the state. The reason is that when humans perform linguistic communication, they use media. Media extend the distance of linguistic communication. Humans interact with one another on a large scale. They form a large community. This leads to the dissolution of the tribes and the formation of the state. Language plays a role in the growth of the state in every aspect. Language plays a role in the formation of the state, in the governance of the state and in the building of the spirit of the state. That is, language is used as a means to form a state and is enacted in various ways that help achieve political objectives. Language allows for people in a very large number to communicate with each other on a large scale to the effect that a state is formed. As language forms the basis of communication, politics is thus affected by language.

Political linguistics is a performance. In order for the public to have positive sentiments towards a party, a politician will carefully craft their manifesto in order to convince the reader of their credibility. These political parties will then be part of a system of communication between the state and the governed, which helps them influence opinions and also their power. Hence, political linguistics is a tool of persuasion in politics, especially in speeches and campaigns. When studying political linguistics, one can pay attention to the effects of slogans, mass media, debates and propaganda to persuade the values and identities of individuals.

There are strong relationships between political linguistics, social linguistics, and media linguistics.

Political linguistics is distinct from linguistic politics or language politics, which refer to the politics of language itself. Language is attached to national, cultural and ethnic identity, hence, the way language is used and disseminated is political and can be used for political gain.

== Strategies within Political Discourse ==
Language is inseparable from the political domain. It can be used in strategies to influence public thought.

Political discourse is about "the text and talk of professional politicians or political institutions, such as presidents and prime ministers and other members of government, parliament or political parties, both at the local, national and international levels".

When referring to propaganda, Hitler stated that all propaganda needed to be popular, but its intellectual content must be kept to a minimum. Instead, it should appeal to their emotions, with its effectiveness being based on the extent to which the masses’ emotions are exploited.

In this manner, according to Social Identity Theory, language can be used to divide a community by creating an in-group and an out-group. Additionally, it can be used to exaggerate the seriousness of a situation or ostracise a certain demographic.

=== Politics embedded in language ===
Languages differ essentially in what they must convey and not in what they may convey. Hence, people will strategically produce utterances in ways they expect their audience to interpret the meaning they are trying to convey. When using language, even if in a thought, any individual will seek an audience and a response from them is expected. Erving Goffman believes when "a person volunteers a statement or message, however trivial or common-place, he commits himself and those he addresses, and in a sense places everyone present in jeopardy. By saying something, the speaker opens himself up to the possibility that the intended recipients will affront him by not listening or will think him forward, foolish, or offensive in what he has said." When an utterance is made or a statement is written, a response is solicited from the audience (whether intended or not), hence, according to Goffman's Face Theory, the speaker will choose his words wisely to gain the most favourable response. "One can see the deferential use of the plural as both a negative and a positive face strategy. Addressing someone as, in effect, ‘you and yours', deflects the force of the speech act from the individual spoken to, making it less direct and less threatening. At the same time, it increases the ‘size’ of the addressee, as it were, implying that this person matters too much to be treated as a mere singular."

=== Strategies in communication ===
Face saving can appear in language choice as well. We can observe how the politics of interpersonal relationships are embedded in linguistic sign. Since different languages have different lexicons and syntax, various meanings emerge when people try to say the same things at the same time.

For example, "interpersonal relations are not performed linguistically in the same way in English as in all those other European languages that have a polite form." In French, this relationship is performed between the speaker and their interlocutor(s) by the word choice of tu or vous to show intimacy or distantness. In English, this relationship can be performed by calling the interlocutors by their first name or by their title and surname, but can generally be avoided if they speakers choose to do so.

The study of political linguistics is particularly useful when analyzing international negotiations. International negotiations are complex events with many factors where language and culture barriers often occur. Translators run into difficulties ensuring that nuances and details are not lost in the translation process. In March 2021, Chinese interpreter Zhang Jing gained fame after she was able to translate speeches which were at least 10 minutes long in a smooth and accurate manner. Her capability has prompted many netizens to sing praises of China, saying that she was "calm and collected, could translate and convey the message accurately, fully displaying the country’s diplomatic team’s elegance". In a sense, Zhang’s capabilities have not just revealed the quality of China’s diplomatic team, but improved the public’s perception of the government as well. This shows how important it is to have a good grasp of political linguistics.

Question framing is the forming of questions to elicit certain responses. This is particularly useful in negotiation as it can lead opponents to answer questions in specific ways. As an example, the Institute for Social Research at the University of Michigan investigated question framing in racial attitudes. The various scientists working on the project found that the wording of questions had great bearing on whether respondents attributed characteristics to an individual or to their racial group. Race has always been a factor of politics and the use of political linguistics to downplay racial tensions may be used by political parties. They could use questions framed to emphasize individual achievement rather than the overarching problems.

== Common manifestations of Political Linguistics ==
=== Propaganda ===
Prominent examples of political manipulation in the form of propaganda can be seen in many countries. These can be found in political elections, media, debates and propaganda posters.

The terms of propaganda are designed consciously, in order to hinder thought and understanding. For example, in the 1940s there was a decision made in public relation circles to introduce terms like "free enterprise" and "free world" instead of the conventional descriptive terms like "capitalism". Part of the reason could be to insinuate somehow that the systems of control and domination and aggression to which those with power were committed were in fact a kind of freedom. Hitler had stated that all propaganda needed to be popular, but its intellectual content must be kept to a minimum. Instead, it should appeal to their emotions, with its effectiveness being based on the extent to which the masses’ emotions are exploited.

During World War II, in Germany, the Nazis heavily used posters to spread propaganda. These posters usually had short captions blaming the Jews for the problems the Germans were facing, but provided no logical explanation for the statements. This exploits the negative emotions the Germans have towards their economic situation, and pushes the blame to the Jews.

=== Examples of political strategies ===
==== In Singapore ====
In 2020, Singapore had its general elections. Prime Minister Lee Hsien Loong from the ruling party People’s Action Party (PAP) warned Singaporeans against voting for opposition parties. His explanation was that frequent changes of governments do not lead to the societal changes people vote for, implying that voting for opposition might lead to such occurrences in Singapore too. Instead, it could lead to more instability. To emphasise his point, he mentioned that voters should pay attention to other countries whose political consensus fell after frequent handovers of power. He also mentioned how the PAP had served the people well, and will continue to do so. The balance of an example of political instability in other countries together with the contributions of PAP are invoked to convince voters that voting for PAP is the most sound choice since if what they "really want is a PAP MP to look after your constituency and town council, and a PAP government to look after Singapore."

==== In Taiwan ====
In Taiwan, the Chinese Nationalist Party (Kuomintang) who moved to Taiwan after losing the Chinese Civil War to the Chinese Communist Party (CCP) in the late 1940s changed slogans that were previously used in mainland China with one such example, a slogan used to promote anti-communism and to fight against Russian idealism - "反共抗俄救同胞" (fǎngòng kàng'é jiùtóngbāo, Resist communism and fight Russia, rescue our compatriots) - to "反攻復國救同胞" (fǎngōng fùguó jiùtóngbāo, Counter-attack, recover the nation, rescue our compatriots) to construct the idea of Chinese communists as Russian allies and traitors to the Han Chinese. This change required little effort, replacing "fǎngòng, resist communism" to "fǎngōng, counter-attack" and "kàng'é, fight Russia" to "fùguó, recover the nation" while still retaining the original seven characters in the slogan.

==== In the United States ====
Joe Biden’s campaign message in his political battle with Donald Trump is an example of appealing to the attitudes of the masses. A lawsuit was filed against Donald Trump during the 2020 presidential campaign stating "During his 2016 campaign, and throughout his presidency, Trump had threatened violence towards his opponents, encouraged his followers to commit acts of violence, and condoned acts of violence by his followers, including white supremacists and far rightwing hate groups." The campaign used Biden’s basic decency to contrast with Trump. Urging American citizens to "join in the battle for the soul of the nation" on his side, Biden persuaded the masses to make the ‘right’ choice against Trump, stating that if given "eight years in the White House, he will forever and fundamentally alter the character of this nation."

=== Social movements ===
Social movements are also places where political linguistics manifest, especially when protestors are pushing for political change. Similarly, some movements aim to have a concise catchphrase to promote their movement.

==== The Umbrella Movement in Hong Kong ====
In 2014, the name of the social movement, the Umbrella Movement in Hong Kong, makes use of wordplay between the Cantonese and Mandarin Chinese languages, who both have distinct pronunciation and vocabulary rules. When a Mandarin-Chinese reader looks at the Cantonese words for "Umbrella Movement," it will not make much sense to them. In contrast, when a Cantonese-reader looks at the same words, it means both "Chater Road Movement" and, literally, "Umbrella Fight Movement." The significance of the wordplay in the title highlights not only the defence of Hongkongers' distinct language which crucially resides in their cultural identity, as well as the history of the autonomy of Hongkongers.

==== Nationalism Movement protests in Thailand ====
In early 2020, student-led protests begun against the military dominated government, in which the Thai monarchy, after King Vajiralongkorn assumed the throne following the after the death of his father, King Bhumibol Adulyadej, began publicly intervening in political affairs. These student-led protests featured adapted use of popular culture such as the three-fingered salute from Hunger Games, a modified version of the theme song of popular Japanese cartoon Hamtaro, and references to Harry Potter’s "He Who Shall Not Be Named". These uses of popular culture reflects the youths of Thailand, theirs' and their nation's future, making use of things that represents a part of the culture of their generation.

== Politics, language and society ==
Various theorists, including structural and post structural theorists have discussed the link between language and knowledge and its influence in politics.

William Conolly summarizes political linguistics in two ways. First, from the Foucauldian perspective, power is not a possession of agents who exercise it to define the options of others, but a set of pressure lodged in institutional mechanisms which produce and maintain such privileged norms as the subject or the primacy of epistemology. While from the Anglo-American point of view, the self is an agent, capable of forming the intention of deliberately shaping conduct to rules.

Post-structural theorists Derrida and Foucault see authorship as a function rather than an initiating activity. Intentions behind the performance of political linguistics is never from a single source, but also from sources that precede this source which can come in the form of a heritage of speech and discursive practices.

There is a tendency for humans to relate things of the past to the present. Semantics of World War I were applied in preparation for World War II. We seem to have been preparing for World War III, despite desperately not wanting it, by applying the semantics of World War II.Give concrete examples of this Meanings are assigned by association with other words put together by other people (usually in the mass media) rather than from direct experience with things and events.

In support, C. Wright Mills locates the meaning of utterances in the social functions they perform. He suggests that a scrutiny on motives not to find out the reasons a given person is engaged in a particular act but about the kinds of justifications for action that are legitimized in a society at a given time. J. G. A. Pocock speaks similarly to Mills, stating "language is a repository of sedimented power and that to understand the language-power relationship, attention should be focused not on the intention of the individual user but rather on the inheritance of practices and conceptions that precede what comes out of the speaker’s mouth." He added further that resistance to language means "reshaping language in order to reshape how we can define ourselves and thus how we can act."

All linguistic accounts have perspectives to promote or a task to accomplish. Neutral accounts of activities carry with them, by virtue of their grammatical and rhetorical structures, implicit political arguments and legitimations for entrenched authority which seek to disestablish existing structures of power and domination.

Words are distinctive representations of the things referred to, and these representations can be manipulated symbolically. The meaning of a word can be understood as a simultaneous bundle of distinctive semantic features. These features solicit different reactions to things and events which have been found to make a difference in changes to the physical and social environments.

At times, it is only through breaking language rules that we can force our language into a more accurate portrayal of things as they are. For example, when a young boy was accused of a felony, exclaims, ‘Ah ain’t nevah done nothin’ to nobody nohow!’, he is guilty of a quintuple negative at the very least – but his claim to honorable character is being vividly made.

Effective metaphors also break semantic rules optimally. The link language to reality in ways existing lexicons cannot. Winston Churchill’s coinage of the phrase Iron Curtain broke pragmatic, if not semantic, rules of English, but it certainly provided an apt characterization of the Cold War situation at the time.

=== Symmetry with social realities ===
Political linguistics is highly convincing because of the symmetry with the social realities of the masses. It is a strategic use of language that appeals to and empowers people.

Murray Edelman believes "language used by a particular class of persons both constitutes a kind of political reality that enables or empowers the helping professional and disenables their clientele." It is difficult to oppose their power or authority because the language used is well within the people’s linguistic universe. In Kenneth Burke’s review of Mein Kampf, he focuses on rhetorical structures rather than individual terms. He demonstrates that an appeal to mass attitudes is effective by connecting itself to rhetorical structures which are already a part of general discursive practices and thus generalised understandings. He references Mein Kampf’s strategy is "the appropriation of ‘church thought’ with its already established script for relating economic ills to problems of personality. It therefore sets the stage for both scape-goating the Jews and for exalting the dignity of the Aryan, and, ultimately, for legitimizing violence in order to effect the desired movement in status."

Friedrich Nietzsche believes the inquiry into what people say is to learn how they construct their worlds. "The language of people’s transaction is, both grammatically and rhetorically, a set of contrivances which locks people into identities and gives them objects and kinds of action with predetermined value."

== See also ==
- Political communication
