= Cognitive poetics =

School of literary criticism

Cognitive poetics is a school of literary criticism that applies the principles of cognitive science, particularly cognitive psychology, to the interpretation of literary texts. It has ties to reader-response criticism, and also has a grounding in modern principles of cognitive linguistics. The research and focus on cognitive poetics pave the way for psychological, sociocultural and indeed linguistic dimensions to develop in relation to stylistics.

Topics addressed by cognitive poetics include deixis; text world theory (the feeling of immersion within texts); schema, script, and their role in reading; attention; foregrounding; and genre.

One of the main focal points of cognitive literary analysis is conceptual metaphor, an idea pioneered and popularized by the works of Lakoff, as a tool for examining texts. Rather than regarding metaphors as ornamental figures of speech, cognitive poetics examines how the conceptual bases of such metaphors interact with the text as a whole.

== Background ==
Prominent figures in the field include Reuven Tsur, who is credited for originating the term, Ronald Langacker, Mark Turner, Gerard Steen, Joanna Gavins and Peter Stockwell. Although Tsur's original, "precise and particular" sense of the term poetics was related to his theory of "poetry and perception", it has come to be "more broadly applied" to any "theory" or "system" of the workings (Greek poiesis) of literature of any genre.

During the first half of the twentieth century, emphasis was placed on the particular literary text itself. Moreover, concentration on style and linguistic placement of the texts helped to place importance on the structural patterns prevalent within the literature. However, during this time period, attention to the human interaction aspect of literary analysis was largely unobserved.

Cognitive poetics, therefore aimed to describe how poetic language and form are naturally constrained and shaped by various human cognitive processes. It allows for the science of cognition and the literary understanding regarding literary texts to both have significance when conducting any literary analytical process. Moreover, cognitive poetics helps demonstrate how ways of expression and ways of conscious perception are mutually inclusive.

The nature of literature involves explaining its function and application in the human mind. Cognitive poetics therefore illustrates just how vital the means of comprehending and analysing literature is to the process of human cognition.

== Application ==
=== Media and Everyday Life ===
While the framework for cognitive poetics was still in its infancy during the 1990s, the internet was simultaneously becoming an increasingly popular academic device for research purposes. This technological advancement enabled a large range of cognitive linguists to share their ideas, and scholarly awareness regarding cognitive poetics globally began to diffuse.

The current technological advancements and adjustments pertaining to the internet, social media, music, film, and television have broadened the definition of literature. Hence, the applicability of cognitive poetics to a wider scope has been realised.

The result of this recent rise in cognitive poetics solidifies the assumptions that the theory views literature as a particular type of everyday experience, especially cognition that is innate in our general cognitive capabilities for navigating the world. It further establishes the relationship of literature with the human experience and cognition. The theory states that it is due to this relationship that humans can interact in these unique methods amongst each other to begin with. The consistent and overlapping nature amongst non-literary and literary backgrounds of language use is especially emphasised through the everyday application of cognitive poetics.

=== Cognitive-Linguistic Significance ===
The close link between knowledge and meaning is essential to establish in cognitive linguistic assumptions. According to these assumptions, language is understood through an individual’s knowledge of the world. In relation to cognitive poetics, this significant relationship is also deemed a crucial assumption for the theory, as it can be applied in terms of the nature and language of literature.

Cognitive linguists use metaphor as an example for the intersection between knowledge and meaning. They explain that the root of metaphor may originate from metaphorical thought, which is described as a result of an individual’s reflection on their real-world experiences. This highlights another key assumption cognitive linguists maintain, that is, language, cognition and experience are closely connected.

Consequently, observing metaphors in this manner helps uncover the contextual background of the writer in question. In cognitive poetics, context is an essential notion for understanding literature.

One example of cognitive poetics using these assumptions is in the literary device of humour. Through the combination of metaphors and the manipulation of metaphorical schemas, a writer can successfully draw upon the desired emotional response. More research on the role of humour and cognitive poetics is needed.

== Criticism ==
=== The empirical gap ===
Many cognitive poetic frameworks borrow terminology from cognitive psychology but without importing the methodological standards — controlled experiments, falsifiability, operationalized constructs. The "cognitive" in cognitive poetics is often more metaphorical than scientific.

=== The correlation problem ===
Observing that readers report a certain experience and that the text has a certain feature doesn't establish that one causes the other, let alone via the postulated mechanism. Schema theory, for instance, can explain almost any interpretive outcome post-hoc, which makes it unfalsifiable in practice.

=== Construct validity ===
Terms like "text-world" or "deictic shift" are rarely defined with the precision needed to test whether they're actually distinct, coherent constructs or just umbrella labels for heterogeneous phenomena.

== See also ==
- Cognitive philology
- Cognitive rhetoric
- Critical theory
- Literary theory
- Evolutionary psychology
- Neuropsychology

== Bibliography ==
- Bachelard, Gaston (1960). La poétique de la rêverie. Paris: Presses Universitaires de France.
- Boyd, Brian (2009). On the Origin of Stories: Evolution, Cognition, and Fiction. Harvard.
- Brône, Geert and Jeroen Vandaele (2009). Cognitive Poetics. Goals, Gains and Gaps. Berlin: Mouton de Gruyter.
- Campbell, Paul (2009). Cognitive Poetics: A Multimodal Approach. semioticon.com. Retrieved 2022-02-19.
- Freeman, Margaret H. (2009). Cognitive Linguistic Approaches to Literary Studies: State of the Art in Cognitive Poetics. Rochester, NY.
- Gavins, Joanna and Gerard Steen (2003). Cognitive Poetics in Practice. London: Routledge.
- Gottschall, Jonathan (2012). The Storytelling Animal: How Stories Make Us Human. Houghton.
- Semino, Elena and Jonathan Culpeper (2002). Cognitive Stylistics: Language and Cognition in Text Analysis. Amsterdam and Philadelphia: John Benjamins.
- Stockwell, Peter (2002). Cognitive Poetics: An Introduction. London: Routledge.
- Stockwell, Peter (2007). Cognitive Poetics and Literary Theory. 1 (1): 135–152.
- Stockwell, Peter (2020). Cognitive Poetics: An Introduction. Second Edition. London: Routledge.
- Tsur, Reuven (2008). Toward a Theory of Cognitive Poetics, Second, expanded and updated edition. Brighton and Portland: Sussex Academic Press.
- Vermeule, Blakey (2010). Why Do We Care about Literary Characters? Baltimore: Johns Hopkins.
- Wolf, Maryanne (2007). Proust and the Squid: The Story and Science of the Reading Brain. Harper.
- Zunshine, Lisa (2006). Why We Read Fiction: Theory of Mind and the Novel. Ohio State University.
