= Stephen Ullmann =

Hungarian linguist (1914–1976)

- Born: 31 July 1914; Budapest, Hungary
- Died: 10 January 1976 (aged 61); Oxford, England
- Notable work: The Principles of Semantics, The Epic of the Finnish nation
- Spouse: Susan Ullmann (m. 1939)
- Children: Diana, Michael, Patricia

Stephen Ullmann (Hungarian: Ullmann István; 31 July 1914 – 10 January 1976) was a Hungarian linguist who spent most of his life in England and wrote about style and semantics in Romance and common languages.

== Biography ==
Born in Budapest, Austria-Hungary, Ullmann achieved degrees from Eötvös Loránd University (otherwise known as the University of Budapest) and the University of Glasgow.

== Academic career ==
After working for the BBC Monitoring Service during the Second World War, Ullmann gained an appointment as lecturer in Philology and Linguistics at the University of Glasgow in 1946. He was promoted to a senior lectureship in 1950, after having graduated DLitt on 5 November 1949 with the thesis titled "The Principles of Semantics" which had a profound influence on the Linguistics field.

Ullmann later taught at the University of Leeds where he was Professor of French Language and Romance Philology from 1953 to 1968, and at Oxford University. In 1974 he spent five months as a visitor at the Australian National University's department of Romance languages, where he lectured on "Words and their meanings".

Ullmann's ideas on semantics are said to be backed up by a wealth of published materials from across Europe. In addition, his works were translated into a variety of languages, such as French, Russian, Japanese and Spanish

== Death ==
On 10 January 1976 Ullmann suffered a heart attack while walking home in his home town of Kidlington and died on the same day. He was described by The Times as 'one of the most eminent Romance philologists this country has ever known'.

== Publications ==
- The Principles of Semantics (1951)
- Words and Their Use (1951)
- Précis de Sémantique Française (1952)
- Semantics: An Introduction to the Science of Meaning (1962)
- Language and Style (1964)
- Meaning and Style (1973)
