= Reuven Tsur =

Israeli literary scholar and professor emeritus

- ראובן צור
- Prof. Reuven Tsur
- Born: 15 December 1932; Oradea, Romania
- Died: 6 September 2021 (aged 88)
- Occupations: Professor of Hebrew literature; Literary theorist
- Known for: Developing the approach of "Cognitive Poetics"
- Awards: Israel Prize in literature (2009); Honorary doctorate from Osnabrück University (2013)

Reuven Tsur (Hebrew: ראובן צור; December 15, 1932 – September 6, 2021) was a professor emeritus of Hebrew literature and literary theory at Tel Aviv University. He was born in Oradea (Nagyvárad), Romania. His mother tongue was Hungarian. Tsur died on September 6, 2021, at the age of 88.

== Literary scholarship ==
In his doctoral dissertation (Sussex University, 1971) Tsur developed an approach which he later called "Cognitive Poetics". This is an interdisciplinary approach that combines literary theory, linguistics, psychology, and philosophy. It explores the relationship between the structure of the text and the human qualities perceived in it, and the mediating processes that take place in the reader's mind. He applied Cognitive Poetics to rhyme, sound symbolism, poetic rhythm, metaphor, poetry and altered states of consciousness, period style, genre, archetypal patterns, translation theory, the implied critic's decision style, critical competence and literary history. In his books and articles he applied his theories to English, French, German, Hungarian, Italian, Spanish, and Hebrew poetry, ranging from the Bible, through the eleventh, sixteenth and seventeenth century, to the eighteenth, nineteenth and twentieth century.

His theory of metaphor has two facets: the creation and understanding of novel meanings (based on the "controversion" and "feature deletion" theories), and perceived qualities. In his criticism of George Lakoff's claim that a road mentioned in a poem must be interpreted in light of the "life is a journey" conceptual metaphor he argued that in various works "road" may assume an indefinite number of unforeseen meanings (one of which may be "life is a journey"). In his study of poetic rhythm he argues that no rules of metre have yet been devised that have not been violated by John Milton and Percy Bysshe Shelley, who are usually regarded as exceptionally musical poets. This required to shift the focus of investigation from what deviations are permissible in metrics to the question whether a performance can be imagined or secured in which the conflicting patterns of language and versification can be perceived at the same time. He has developed a theory that enables him to investigate the auditory information that affects the reader's or listener's impression ("what our ears tell our mind"). This theory includes a theory of rhythmical performance, submitting recorded readings to an instrumental analysis. For his work in Cognitive Poetics and poetic rhythm Tsur was awarded the 2009 Israel Prize in general literature. In its reasons, the Prize committee states that "he is one of the outstanding, internationally renowned scholars of literature in Israel, who has the reputation of an exceptionally original researcher and theoretician of literature".

== Awards and recognition ==
- In 2009, Tsur was awarded the Israel Prize in literature.
- In 2013, Tsur received an honorary doctorate from Osnabrück University, Germany

== Published works ==
- A Perception-oriented Theory of Metre (Tel Aviv: The Porter Institute for Poetics and Semiotics, 1977)
- What is Cognitive Poetics (Tel Aviv: The Katz Research Institute for Hebrew Literature, 1983)
- On metaphoring (Jerusalem: Israel Science Publishers, 1987)
- Toward a Theory of Cognitive Poetics (Amsterdam: Elsevier, 1992) Review. Second, expanded and updated edition (Sussex Academic Press, 2008).
- Poetic Rhythm: Structure and Performance—An Empirical Study in Cognitive Poetics (Bern: Peter Lang, 1998)
- "Kubla Khan"—poetic Structure, Hypnotic Quality, and Cognitive Style (John Benjamins, 2006)
- On the shore of nothingness: space, rhythm, and semantic structure ()

== See also ==
- List of Israel Prize recipients
- Cognitive poetics
