= Cognitive philology =

Branch of cognitive science

Cognitive philology is the science that studies written and oral texts as the product of human mental processes. Studies in cognitive philology compare documentary evidence emerging from textual investigations with results of experimental research, especially in the fields of cognitive and ecological psychology, neurosciences and artificial intelligence. "The point is not the text, but the mind that made it". Cognitive Philology aims to foster communication between literary, textual, philological disciplines on the one hand and researches across the whole range of the cognitive, evolutionary, ecological and human sciences on the other.

Cognitive philology:

- investigates transmission of oral and written text, and categorization processes which lead to classification of knowledge, mostly relying on the information theory;
- studies how narratives emerge in so called natural conversation and selective process which lead to the rise of literary standards for storytelling, mostly relying on embodied semantics;
- explores the evolutive and evolutionary role played by rhythm and metre in human ontogenetic and phylogenetic development and the pertinence of the semantic association during processing of cognitive maps;
- Provides the scientific ground for multimedia critical editions of literary texts.

Among the founding thinkers and noteworthy scholars devoted to such investigations are:

- Alan Richardson: Studies Theory of Mind in early-modern and contemporary literature.
- Anatole Pierre Fuksas
- Benoît de Cornulier
- David Herman: Professor of English at North Carolina State University and an adjunct professor of linguistics at Duke University. He is the author of "Universal Grammar and Narrative Form" and the editor of "Narratologies: New Perspectives on Narrative Analysis".
- Domenico Fiormonte
- François Recanati
- Gilles Fauconnier, a professor in Cognitive science at the University of California, San Diego. He was one of the founders of cognitive linguistics in the 1970s through his work on pragmatic scales and mental spaces. His research explores the areas of conceptual integration and compressions of conceptual mappings in terms of the emergent structure in language.
- Julián Santano Moreno
- Luca Nobile
- Manfred Jahn in Germany
- Mark Turner
- Paolo Canettieri

== See also ==
- Artificial intelligence
- Cognitive archaeology
- Cognitive linguistics
- Cognitive poetics
- Cognitive psychology
- Cognitive rhetoric
- Information theory
- Philology
