= Irene Tucker =

American literary critic and theorist

Irene Tucker is a literary critic and theorist. She is Professor of English at the University of California, Irvine. She has authored two books, A Probable State: The Novel, the Contract, and the Jews (2000) and The Moment of Racial Sight: A History (2012), as well as the treatise A Brief Genealogy of Jewish Republicanism (2016). Tucker earned her B.A. from Columbia University and Ph.D. from University of California, Berkeley.

== Publications ==
=== A Probable State (2000) ===
In realist novels, characters act as agents struggling in an everyday, empirical world of open-ended, unfolding contingent events but readers know at every moment that they are consuming the imaginative product of a controlling author, who might turn those characters this way or that. One of Tucker’s basic achievements in A Probable State is to recharacterize realism and the liberal subject generated by its consumption around precisely the fact that the realist novel gets its readers to suspend this basic tension. Tucker shows the realist novel is diachronically probabilistic. In realism’s embrace, one comes to know the world through time and only incompletely, buffeted by empirical historical contingencies on all sides, but also nonetheless detached and understanding oneself, in tune with the controlling author’s meaningful expression of will, to know enough to be freely acting and self-determining agents. The end of realism can be seen as the moment “when the liberal subject’s capacity to know ceased to appear adequate to the task of allowing that subject to act freely.”

=== The Moment of Racial Sight: A History (2012) ===
In The Moment of Racial Sight, Tucker asks: What was it about skin that allowed it to come to emerge as a primary marker of race in the late eighteenth century and nineteenth century? Tucker first reads Kant, considered the earliest to solidify the identification of race with skin. Skin color, for Kant, gave immediate proof that people in the present had had a similar geographical groupings in the past, and in so doing it also helped him resolve certain incoherencies in his philosophy that were presented—especially clearly as he faced his own dying—by the fact that bodies are not even like themselves over time. As Tucker explains, Kant’s logical solution via skin also underpinned the contemporary emerging medical epistemology based around anatomy. Tucker brings into focus the significance of the fact that as medicine shifted away from a humoral model, skin newly came to serve to construct the opacity of our knowledge of our own body’s inner workings. That opacity authorizes modern medical knowledge. Modern medicine had, however, thereby founded itself on an epistemological temporal incoherence. By definition, in anatomical medicine cutting open dead bodies provided the grounds for knowledge, but for the doctors and patients alike that diagnostic moment tragically came a bit too late. They were struggling to treat live bodies that were sick. This temporal incoherence, hinged on the opacity of skin, made the likeness of bodies into a problem of immediate cognition: the perplexity and reach of this logic is the subject Tucker treats in depth.
