= Poetics Today =

- Discipline: Poetics
- Language: English
- Edited by: Irene Tucker and Milette Shamir

Publication details
- History: 1979–present
- Publisher: Duke University Press for the Porter Institute for Poetics and Semiotics, Tel Aviv University
- Frequency: Quarterly

Standard abbreviations
- ISO 4: Poet. Today

Indexing
- ISSN: 0333-5372 (print); 1527-5507 (web)
- OCLC no.: 6301422

Links
- Journal homepage; Online access; Online archive; Journal page at publisher's website; Journal page at university website

Poetics Today: International Journal for Theory and Analysis of Literature and Communication is a quarterly peer-reviewed academic journal in the field of poetics. The editors-in-chief are Irene Tucker and Milette Shamir.

== Abstracting and indexing ==
The journal is abstracted and indexed in:

- Academic Search Elite
- Arts and Humanities Citation Index
- Current Contents/Arts and Humanities
- Expanded Academic ASAP
- MLA Bibliography
- Scopus
- Sociological Abstracts
