= John Benjamins Publishing Company =

Independent academic publisher in the Netherlands

- Founder: John Benjamins; Claire Benjamins
- Country of origin: Netherlands
- Headquarters location: Amsterdam
- Key people: Seline Benjamins
- Publication types: Books, Academic journals
- Imprints: B. R. Grüner
- Official website: www.benjamins.com

John Benjamins Publishing Company is an independent academic publisher in social sciences and humanities with its head office in Amsterdam, Netherlands. The company was founded in the 1960s by John and Claire Benjamins and is currently managed by their daughter Seline Benjamins.

John Benjamins is especially noted for its publications in language, linguistics, translation studies, political linguistics and literary studies. It publishes books, as well as 80+ academic journals, including among others: Diachronica, International Journal of Corpus Linguistics, Language Problems and Language Planning, Studies in Language, Lingvisticae Investigationes, Target, Translation, Cognition & Behavior, Journal of Language and Politics and Linguistics of the Tibeto-Burman Area.

John Benjamins publishes in print as well as online.

John Benjamins Publishing Company is a member of these professional and trade organizations: STM Association, ALPSP, UKSG, Mediafederatie-MEVW, CrossRef.
