= Presidents' Award =

The Presidents' Award is an mid-career award of the British Psychological Society's Research Board, given in recognition of outstanding published work in psychology. Nominees will have made a major outstanding contribution in particular sub-fields of psychology (rather than a culmination of a career in psychology). They will be engaged in research of outstanding quality as evidenced through significant books, journal articles an other specific key contributions or developments.

== List of medal winners ==
Source: British Psychological Society

Year	Medal winner
1981	Alan Baddeley
1982	Peter B. Warr
1983	Jeffrey Alan Gray
1984	Peter Bryant
1985	Philip Johnson-Laird
1986	Nicholas Mackintosh
1987	Max Coltheart
1988	John Morton
1989	Howard Giles
1990	Uta Frith
1991	Tim Shallice
1992	Andrew Matthews
1993	Michael Morgan
1994	Marie Johnston
1995	Andrew Young
1996	Frank Fincham
1997	Vicki Bruce
1998	John Sloboda
1999	Glyn Humphreys
2000	Peter Perrett
2001	Miles Hewstone
2002	Graham Hitch
2003	Margaret J. Snowling
2004	Tony Manstead and Steven Tipper
2005	Peter Halligan
2006	Simon Baron-Cohen
2007	Susan Gathercole
2008	Mark H. Johnson
2009	Dominic Abrams and Jon Driver
2010	Paul Burgess
2011	Usha Goswami
2012	Constantine Sedikides
2013	Tim Dalgleish
2014	Richard J. Crisp
2015	Matthew Lambon Ralph
2016	Alex Haslam
2017	Marcus Munafò
2018	Sarah-Jayne Blakemore
2019	Francesca Happé
2020	Daniel Freeman
2021	Lucia Valmaggia
2022	Victoria Clarke
2023	Essi Viding
2024	Yi-Ling Lai
2025	Beth Jefferies
2026	Sander van der Linden

== See also ==
- List of psychology awards
