= The Experiment =

2002 BBC television documentary series

- Opening title for the BBC series
- Starring: Steve Reicher, Alex Haslam
- Narrated by: David Suchet
- Country of origin: United Kingdom
- Original language: English
- No. of seasons: 1
- No. of episodes: 4

Production
- Executive producer: Nick Mirsky
- Producers: Kuldip Dhadda, Stephanie Harvie, Gary Hunter
- Production locations: St Andrews, United Kingdom
- Running time: Hour long episodes

Original release
- Network: BBC
- Release: 1 May – 22 May 2002

The Experiment is a 2002 BBC documentary series in which 15 men are randomly selected to be either "prisoner" or guard, contained in a simulated prison over an eight-day period. Produced by Steve Reicher and Alex Haslam, it presents the findings of what has subsequently become known as the BBC Prison Study. These findings centered around "the social and psychological consequences of putting people in groups of unequal power" and "when people accept inequality and when they challenge it".

== Background ==
The findings of the study were very different from those of the Stanford Prison Experiment. Specifically, (a) there was no evidence of guards conforming "naturally" to the role, and (b) in response to manipulations that served to increase a sense of shared identity amongst the prisoners, over time, they demonstrated increased resistance to the guards' regime. This culminated in a prison breakout on Day 6 of the study that made the regime unworkable. After this, the participants created a "self-governing commune" but this too collapsed due to internal tensions created by those who had organized the earlier breakout. After this, a group of former prisoners and guards conspired to install a new prisoner-guard regime in which they would be the "new guards". Now, however, they wanted to run the system along much harsher lines – akin to those seen in the Stanford study. Signs that this would compromise the well-being of participants led to early termination of the study.

=== Stanford experiment ===
The genesis of the programme was the 1971 Stanford prison experiment carried out by Philip Zimbardo at Stanford University, in which a group of students were recruited to perform the roles of 'prisoner' and 'guard' as a psychological experiment to test how human beings conform to roles. That study was brought to a premature end as a result of the extreme brutality displayed by guards towards prisoners.

=== Milgram experiment ===
This itself was related to the Milgram experiment at Yale University in 1961.

The BBC Experiment was led by psychologists Professor Alex Haslam (University of Queensland) and Professor Steve Reicher (University of St Andrews) who planned and designed the psychological experiment with the series' executive producer Nick Mirsky and producer Gaby Koppel of the BBC. At the time, Reicher was editor of the British Journal of Social Psychology and Haslam was editor-elect of the European Journal of Social Psychology.

== Ethical considerations ==
Before The Experiment could proceed, the researchers had to secure formal ethical approval from the University of Exeter. This approval was conditional on the BBC putting in place a range of safeguards to protect against psychological damage to the participants. Key safeguards included:

- Screening of participants by clinical psychologists, together with medical and police checks
- Round-the-clock monitoring by clinical psychologists, medics and security personnel
- The creation of a six-person ethics committee, chaired by Lembit Öpik MP. Members of this Committee included Dr Stephen Smith of the Beth Shalom Holocaust Centre, and Steven Taylor, a prison reform campaigner. This committee was given the power to stop The Experiment at any time if a majority of the six members felt that participants were coming to psychological or other harm. This was the first time the BBC had given such power to an external, independent body. This power was used when The Experiment was brought to an end two days earlier than planned, after consultation with Haslam and Reicher.

== Phases of the study ==
=== Arrival ===
On the first day, the guards arrive at the prison. They are given uniforms and instructions on how to run the prison. Before the prisoners even arrive, the guards have gained a sense of ownership towards the prison.

=== Creating social identity ===
Next, the prisoners arrive and are immediately ordered to shower and change into uniforms. All their personal items are taken away, even their hair, which is cut off. Prisoners are unhappy with their mistreatment but acknowledge that there is nothing they can do to change their situation. They accept their position, just as the guards have accepted their privilege.

=== The first test ===
The first test begins when the prisoners are informed by the "experimenters" over intercom that they have the chance to be promoted to guard status. This is done to see whether prisoners will work individually, and fail. Or whether they can work together as a group to form a collective resistance to beat the guards altogether. In the series, they depict a split between the prisoners as not everyone wants to be a guard. This split keeps them from acting as a group.

=== Cognitive dissonance ===
In both groups, there are several members trying to distance themselves from their assigned roles. Later that evening, the guards acknowledge how different they feel and act as soon as they put on their uniform, which they are uncomfortable with. Although some wish they weren't guards, their privileged resources are too valuable to give up.

=== Power play ===
At breakfast the second day, the guards attempt to relieve their guilt, by offering one of the most valuable resources to the prisoners, food. The prisoners are unhappy that the guards are only doing this out of guilt, so they decline despite eating little the day before. In denying the food the guards have offered, the prisoners have denied their power. Later there was an announcement that there would be no further promotions, leaving the prisoners angry and resentful.

=== Concluding the study ===
After the third day, the prisoners accepted their position, uniting them as a group and allowing them to overthrow the guards. In rebuttal, the guards formed their own government with stricter rules and harder punishment. Finally, Reicher and Haslam were forced to terminate the experiment due to the anticipated breach of ethics due to the newly formed government.

== Themes ==
=== Individual identity ===
Within the series we see an example of social identity. We can see that the guards not only acted like guards, but internalized this term, taking on "guard" as a part of their identity. However, the attainment of this social identity would not have been possible if the prisoners did not take on "prisoner" as their social identity as well.

=== Group identity ===
As a reaction of individual social identity, groups were able to form through shared goals and identities. There are two distinct groups in the series, "prisoner" and "guard", each striving to achieve their own goals through collective self-realization. "Collective self-realization has immense psychological benefits for individual group members. As we saw when the Prisoners first confronted the Guards and later when the Commune was established, the success of groups in bringing about social change is uplifting for their members." This helped group members to ward off mental health conditions like stress and depression. However destructive the group was to the opposite group and their own mental health, they were effective in their loyalty and maintained consensus.

== Reception ==
The series courted controversy, and was criticised by Philip Zimbardo who said that his original experiment did not need repeating. He also claimed that The Experiment was simply reality television and that it had no scientific base or value, as participants would be playing for the cameras and not acting "normally". In turn, Haslam and Reicher have responded that their goal was not to replicate the Stanford study, but rather to expose limitations in Zimbardo's own theorizing and method. In particular, they sought to demonstrate that internalized group membership could be a basis for resistance as well as tyranny. This prediction was derived from social identity theory, and the study incorporated manipulations designed to test some of its core hypotheses.

Haslam and Reicher also argue that Zimbardo's own findings in the Stanford study arose from the leadership role that he had assumed as prison superintendent: explicitly encouraging the guards to demean the prisoners. Accordingly, in their study, Haslam and Reicher had no formal role within the prison. They also took non-reactive psychometric and physiological measures to back up and triangulate their behavioural observations and address concerns that the processes observed in the study were somehow "unreal".

Zimbardo also criticised the lack of external validity of the findings of the BBC study, since prisoner domination of guards is not observed "anywhere in the known universe". Haslam and Reicher have countered that the purpose of their study was to demonstrate the theoretical possibility of resistance, noting that this is a feature of most social systems in which tyranny prevails (e.g., as argued by Michel Foucault). They also observe that the imprisonment of leaders is often important for the development of resistance movements and for processes of social change. The stress observed among guards in the BBC study also accords with a large body of evidence from the UK and the US that prison officers are particularly prone to high levels of stress and burnout. In 2001, the major report No Escape: Male Rape in U.S. Prisons by the US-based group Human Rights Watch stated that cases of prison authorities ceding control to inmates was "an all too common occurrence".

== Academic output ==
The findings of the production were published as Rethinking the Psychology of Tyranny (2006), providing more detail on the findings of Zimbardo's prison study. What Haslam and Reicher attempted to challenge was the effects of social theory in the initial experiment. Furthermore, they sought to find how people conformed to a group and who would conform.

Confounding initial criticism, findings of the BBC study were reported in scientific papers that were published in leading peer-reviewed journals. These papers addressed the dynamics of tyranny, resistance, stress and leadership. Indeed, it is possible that the study has formed the basis for more academic papers than any other single field experiment in psychology.

These papers challenged the role-based analysis forwarded by Zimbardo and served to elaborate ideas associated with a social identity approach to social, clinical and organizational psychology. One of their central arguments is that individuals only move towards tyranny once they have come to identify with a group and its leadership (in a way that Zimbardo's briefing of his guards encouraged) and once an authoritarian agenda has come to define that group's identity and to be seen as a solution to its problems.

Reflecting its contribution to ongoing debate in this area, in 2007 the BBC Prison study was included in the OCR examination board's Psychology A-level syllabus.

Haslam and Reicher were also able to produce several questions to apply for future studies. The first was whether or not the participants were affected by the camera crew that constantly watched them. Participants were fully aware that they could quit at any moment, a luxury that many people do not have in reality.

== Production ==
Filmed at Elstree Studios in December 2001, the four one-hour programmes were broadcast on 14, 15, 21, and 22 May 2002. The four episodes dealt sequentially with each of the main phases of the study: Conflict, Order, Rebellion and Tyranny.

== Credits ==
Other persons involved in the making of this production include clinical psychologists: Andrew Eagle and Scott Galloway. An independent ethics panel composed of: Lembit Öpik, MP for Montgomeryshire (Chair), Dr Mark McDermott (Senior Lecturer in Psychology), University of East London, Dr. Stephen Smith (Co-founder Holocaust Memorial and Education Centre), Steve Taylor (Council member Howard League for Penal Reform), Andrea Wills, (Chief advisor and BBC Editorial Policy Unit)). A team of research advisors were also used in the process, members included: Andrew Livingstone, Brian Young, David Corner, Denis Sindic, Eva Loth, Fabio Sani, Grant Muir, Lloyd Carson, Nick Hopkins, Huw Williams, Inma Adavares-Yorno, Jolanda Jetten, Lucy O’Sullivan, Mike Howe, Paul Webley, Stephanie Sonnenberg, Stephen Wilks, and Tom Postmes.
