= Alexander Haslam =

British social psychologist (born 1962)

Alexander Haslam AM
- Born: 1962 (age 63–64)
- Education: Felsted School
- Alma mater: University of St Andrews; Emory University; Macquarie University
- Occupation: Academic
- Known for: BBC Prison Study

Stephen Alexander "Alex" Haslam AM (born 1962) is a professor of psychology and ARC Australian Laureate Fellow in the School of Psychology at the University of Queensland.

His research focuses on areas of social psychology, organisational psychology and health psychology, exploring issues of stereotyping and prejudice, tyranny and resistance, leadership and power, stress and well-being. This work is informed by, and has contributed to the development of, theory and ideas relating to the social identity approach.

== Career ==
Haslam grew up in Elsenham, Essex and completed his secondary education at Felsted School. He holds a Master of Arts (MA) degree from the University of St Andrews and a PhD from Macquarie University (Sydney). His doctoral work at Macquarie was supervised by John Turner (psychologist) and funded by a Commonwealth Scholarship. This was preceded by a year as a Robert T. Jones Scholar at Emory University (Atlanta). Prior to his current appointment at the University of Queensland, Haslam worked at the Australian National University (Canberra) (1991–2001) and the University of Exeter (2001–2012).

Haslam is a recipient of the European Association of Social Psychology's Kurt Lewin Medal (2005), the British Psychology Society's Presidents' Award for distinguished contributions to psychological knowledge (2016), the International Society of Political Psychology's Nevitt Sanford Award for distinguished contribution to political psychology (2017), and the Australian Psychological Society's Award for distinguished contribution to psychological science (2018). In 2009 he was granted the British Psychological Society's Award for Excellence in the Teaching of Psychology, and a National Teaching Fellowship from the Higher Education Academy. He was an Associate Editor of the British Journal of Social Psychology from 1999 to 2001 and Editor-in-Chief of the European Journal of Social Psychology from 2001 to 2005, and President of the psychology section of the British Science Association from 2009 to 2010. He is currently an Associate Editor of Leadership Quarterly (from 2017).

== Key research projects ==
=== BBC Prison Study ===
In 2001, Haslam collaborated with Steve Reicher (University of St Andrews) on the BBC television programme The Experiment, which became known as the "BBC Prison Study". This examined the behaviour of a group of individuals within a simulated prison environment, returning to issues raised by the Stanford Prison Experiment (SPE). Amongst other things, the study's findings challenged the role account of tyranny associated with the SPE as well as broader ideas surrounding the "banality of evil". The core insight from the study was that tyranny results from the engaged followership of subordinates rather than blind conformity to roles or rules. Recent work has also demonstrated that the same analysis can explain the behaviour of participants in Milgram's Obedience to Authority experiments.

=== New psychology of leadership ===
Since the 1990s, Haslam has collaborated with a number of social identity researchers, notably Steve Reicher, Michael Platow, and John Turner, developing a social identity analysis of leadership. This work focuses on the role of perceived shared identity as a basis for mutual influence between leaders and followers. It argues that leaders' success hinges on their ability to create, represent, advance and embed a social identity that is shared with those they seek to motivate and inspire.

=== Glass cliff ===
Haslam has worked with Michelle K. Ryan on the leadership experiences of women, and together they coined the term "glass cliff" to describe some of their key findings – specifically, evidence that women are more likely than men to be appointed to leadership roles in organisations that are performing poorly. This was short-listed for the Times Higher Education "Research Project of the Year" in 2005.

=== Social cure ===
Haslam's more recent work (funded by the Australian Research Council) has contributed to the development of the Social Identity Approach to health and well-being, also referred to as "The Social Cure", including the Integrated Social Identity model of Stress (ISIS). This work argues that the sense of social identity derived from shared group membership is a basis not only for individuals to have a sense of meaning and purpose in their lives, but also for them to receive and benefit from social support. It is also a basis for them to work together to overcome stressors rather than succumb to them.

== Awards and honors ==
In 2011, he was awarded an Australian Laureate Fellowship. He was appointed a Member of the Order of Australia in the 2022 Australia Day Honours for "significant service to tertiary education, particularly psychology, though research and mentoring".

== Selected publications ==
=== Monographs ===
- Oakes, P. J., Haslam, S. A., & Turner, J. C. (1994). Stereotyping and social reality. Blackwell.
- Haslam, S. A., & McGarty, C. (2003). Research methods and statistics in psychology. Sage.
- Haslam, S. A. (2001). Psychology in organisations: The social identity approach. Sage. (2nd ed. 2004)
- Haslam, S. A., Reicher, S. D. & Platow, M. J. (2011). The new psychology of leadership: Identity, influence and power. London: Psychology Press. (2nd ed. 2020)
- Haslam, C., Jetten, J., Cruwys, T., Dingle, G. A., & Haslam, S. A. (2018). The new psychology of health: Unlocking the social cure. Routledge.
- Jetten, J., Reicher, S. D., Haslam, S. A., & Cruwys, T. (2020). Together apart: The psychology of COVID-19. Sage.
- Haslam, C., Cruwys, T., Bentley, S. V., Jetten, J., & Haslam, S. A. (2025). GROUPS 4 HEALTH: Managing loneliness and social disconnection. Treatments That Work; Oxford University Press.

=== Edited books ===
- McGarty, C., & Haslam, S. A. (Eds.) (1997). The message of social psychology: Perspectives on mind in society. Blackwell.
- Spears, R., Oakes, P. J., Ellemers, N., & Haslam, S. A. (Eds.) (1997). The social psychology of stereotyping and group life. Blackwell.
- Haslam, S. A., van Knippenberg, D., Platow, M., & Ellemers, N. (Eds.) (2003). Social identity at work: Developing theory for organizational practice. Psychology Press.
- Jetten, J., Haslam, C., & Haslam, S. A. (Eds.) (2012). The social cure: Identity, health and well-being. Psychology Press.
- Smith, J. R., & Haslam, S. A. (Eds.) (2012). Social psychology: Revisiting the classic studies. Sage. (2nd ed, 2017)
- Williams, R., Kemp, V. Haslam, S. A., Haslam, C., Bhui, K. S. & Bailey, S. (Eds.) (2019). Social scaffolding: Applying the lessons of contemporary social science to health and healthcare. Cambridge University Press.
- Haslam, S. A., Fransen, K., & Boen, F. (Eds.) (2020). The new psychology of sport and exercise: The social identity approach. Sage.
