= Kate Nation =

English experimental psychologist

Kate Nation FBA
- Occupation: Professor of Experimental Psychology
- Awards: 2000 Spearman Medal; 2018 AJLD Eminent Research Award

Academic background
- Education: University of York (BS, DPhil)

Academic work
- Discipline: Psychologist
- Sub-discipline: Language development
- Institutions: St. John's College, Oxford

Kate Nation FBA is an English experimental psychologist and expert on language and literacy development in school age children. She is Professor of Experimental Psychology and Fellow of St. John's College of the University of Oxford, where she directs the ReadOxford project and the Language and Cognitive Development Research Group.

Nation won the Spearman Medal in 2000, an award given by the British Psychological Society for outstanding published work by an early career psychologist. Nation's Spearman Medal lecture focused on children with poor reading comprehension whose deficits in language processing often go unnoticed.

Nation gave the 2007 Experimental Psychology Society Prize lecture on "Making connections between learning to read and reading to learn." She was awarded the 2018 AJLD Eminent Researcher Award from Learning Difficulties Australia in recognition of her research on "how children learn to read words and comprehend text, and more generally, the relationship between spoken language and written language".

== Biography ==
Nation received her B.S. and DPhil in Psychology from the University of York. Her dissertation, focusing on children's spelling development, was completed in 1994. Her early research, supervised by Charles Hulme, focused on young children's ability to form analogies between a visually presented stimulus word and a similar sounding target word to be spelled.

Nation worked as a research fellow at the University of York for five years before being appointed as Lecturer in Psychology in 1999. As an early career researcher, Nation collaborated with Maggie Snowling on studies of individuals with reading difficulties, which distinguished the clinical profiles associated with dyslexia and impaired reading comprehension. Their collaborative work highlighted the importance of oral language skills in addition to phonological skills in the development of reading.

Nation moved to the University of Oxford in 2002, where she teaches students in fields of psychology, psycholinguistics, and neuroscience. Nation is an affiliated researcher at the ARC Center of Excellence in Cognition and its Disorders at Macquarie University, where she has collaborated with Anne Castles on studies of orthographic processes in reading.

Nation's research has been supported by grants from the Economic and Social Research Council, the Wellcome Trust, the Nuffield Foundation, and the Leverhulme Trust.

She was elected a Fellow of the British Academy in 2023.

== Research ==
Nation's research program has focuses on the psychology of language and literacy, in typical children and in clinical populations such as children with autism spectrum disorder. Her work indicates that both phonological processing deficits and language comprehension deficits contribute to the development of reading difficulties. Such findings have implications for designing targeted interventions for children with poor reading comprehension skills.

== Representative Publications ==
- Nation, K., Adams, J. W., Bowyer-Crane, C. A., & Snowling, M. J. (1999). Working memory deficits in poor comprehenders reflect underlying language impairments. Journal of Experimental Child Psychology, 73(2), 139–158.
- Nation, K., Clarke, P., Marshall, C. M., & Durand, M. (2004). Hidden language impairments in children: Parallels between poor reading comprehension and specific language impairment? Journal of Speech, Language, and Hearing Research, 47(1), 199–211.
- Nation, K., Clarke, P., Wright, B., & Williams, C. (2006). Patterns of reading ability in children with autism spectrum disorder. Journal of Autism and Developmental Disorders, 36(7), 911–919.
- Nation, K., & Snowling, M. J. (1998). Semantic processing and the development of word-recognition skills: Evidence from children with reading comprehension difficulties. Journal of Memory and Language, 39(1), 85-101.
- Nation, K., & Snowling, M. J. (2004). Beyond phonological skills: Broader language skills contribute to the development of reading. Journal of Research in Reading, 27(4), 342–356.
