= Steve Reicher =

British psychologist

Steve Reicher FBA FRSE
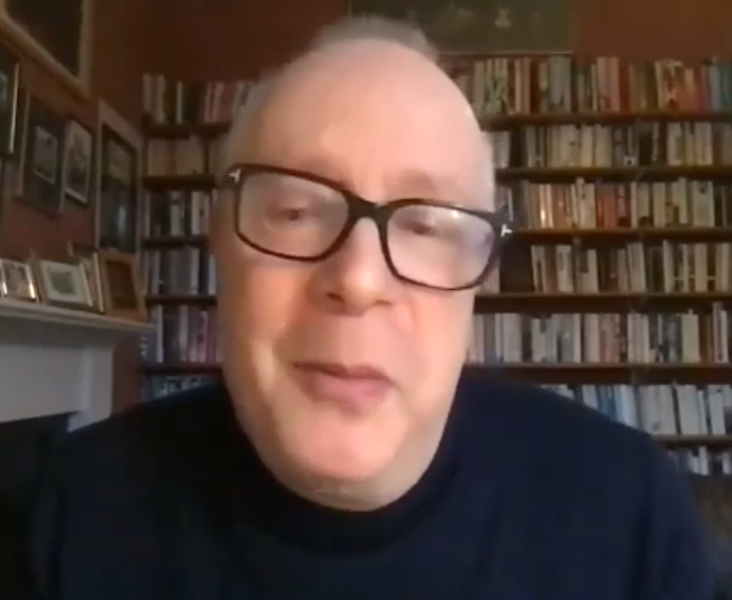
- Giving an online lecture in 2020
- Born: Stephen David Reicher
- Education: University of Bristol (PhD)
- Known for: BBC Prison Study
- Scientific career
- Fields: Social identity; Collective behaviour; Intergroup conflict; Leadership; Mobilisation
- Workplaces: University of St Andrews; University of Dundee; University of Exeter
- Thesis: The determination of collective behaviour (1984)
- Doctoral students: Fabio Sani
- Website: risweb.st-andrews.ac.uk/portal/en/persons/stephen-david-reicher(a0a908db-1bb8-4d5e-ab30-f47643e35169).html

Stephen David Reicher FBA FRSE is Bishop Wardlaw Professor of Social Psychology at the University of St Andrews.

His research is in the area of social psychology, focusing on social identity, collective behaviour, intergroup conflict, leadership and mobilisation. He is broadly interested in the issues of group behaviour and the individual-social relationship.

== Education ==
After attending the Perse School, Cambridge, Reicher completed his undergraduate degree at the University of Bristol, and his PhD also at the University of Bristol in 1984 with a thesis on collective behaviour. At Bristol, Reicher worked closely with Henri Tajfel and John Turner on social identity theory and social identity model of deindividuation effects (SIDE).

== Career and research ==
Reicher held positions at the University of Dundee and University of Exeter before moving to St Andrews in 1997. He was formerly head of the School of Psychology at St Andrews.

He is a former Associate Editor of the Journal of Community and Applied Social Psychology and Chief Editor (with Margaret Wetherell) of the British Journal of Social Psychology. Reicher is an editor for a number of journals including Scientific American Mind. His research is in the area of social psychology, focusing on social identity, collective behaviour, intergroup conflict, leadership and mobilisation. He is broadly interested in the issues of group behaviour and the individual-social relationship. His research interests can be grouped into three areas. The first is an attempt to develop a model of crowd action that accounts for both social determination and social change. The second concerns the construction of social categories through language and action. The third concerns political rhetoric and mass mobilisation – especially around the issue of national identity. His research has been funded by the Economic and Social Research Council (ESRC) and the Engineering and Physical Sciences Research Council (EPSRC). His former doctoral students include John Dixon, John Drury, Nick Hopkins, Mark Levine, Eva Loth, Fabio Sani and Clifford Stott

Stephen Reicher as well as his direct University of Sussex colleague John Drury are both participants in the Sage subcommittee advising on behavioural science during the COVID-19 pandemic. He was also a member of the advisory committee to the Scottish Government and convened the behavioural science group of Independent SAGE.

=== Crowd psychology theory ===
Reicher's work on crowd psychology has challenged the dominant notion of crowd as site of irrationality and deindividuation. His social identity model (SIM, 1982, 1984, 1987) of crowd behaviour suggests that people are able to act as one in crowd events not because of "contagion" or social facilitation but because they share a common social identity. This common identity specifies what counts as normative conduct. Unlike the "classic" theories, which tended to presume an association between collectivity and uncontrolled violence (due to a regression to instinctive drives or a pre-existing "racial unconscious"), the social identity model explicitly acknowledges variety by suggesting that different identities have different norms – some peaceful, some conflictual – and that, even where crowds are conflictual, the targets will be only those specified by the social identity of the crowd.

=== BBC Prison study ===
Reicher collaborated with Alex Haslam of the University of Exeter on the BBC television programme The Experiment, which examined conflict, order, rebellion and tyranny in the behaviour of a group of individuals held in a simulated prison environment. The experiment (which became known as the BBC Prison Study) re-examined issues raised by the Stanford Prison Experiment (SPE) and led to a number of publications in leading psychology journals. Amongst other things, these challenged the role account of tyranny associated with the SPE as well as broader ideas surrounding the Banality of Evil, and advanced a social identity-based understanding of the dynamics of resistance.

== Publications ==
- Reicher, S.D. (1982). "The determination of collective behaviour" (pp. 41–83). In H. Tajfel (ed.), Social identity and intergroup relations. Cambridge: Cambridge University Press.
- Reicher, Stephen David (1984). "The St. Pauls' riot: An explanation of the limits of crowd action in terms of a social identity model". European Journal of Social Psychology. 14 (1): 1–21. doi:10.1002/ejsp.2420140102. ISSN 0046-2772.
- Reicher, S.D. (1984b). "The St Pauls' riot: An explanation of the limits of crowd action in terms of a social identity model". European Journal of Social Psychology, 14, 1–21. Also in: Murphy, J., John, M. & Brown, H. (1984), (eds.). Dialogues and debates in social psychology (pp. 187–205). London: Lawrence Erlbaum/Open University
- Reicher, S. & Potter, J. (1985). "Psychological theory as intergroup perspective: A comparative analysis of 'scientific' and 'lay' accounts of crowd events". Human Relations, 38, 167–189.
- Turner, J. C., Hogg, M. A., Oakes, P. J., Reicher, S. D., & Wetherell, M. S. (1987). Rediscovering the social group: A self-categorization theory. Oxford: Blackwell.
- Reicher, S. D. (1987). "Crowd behaviour as social action" ( (PDF)). Rediscovering the social group: A self-categorization theory. Oxford: Blackwell Publishing. pp. 171–202. Archived from the original on 4 April 2011.
- Reicher, S., Spears, R. & Postmes, T. (1995). "A social identity model of deindividuation phenomena". In W. Stroebe & M. Hewstone (eds.), European Review of Social Psychology, 6, 161–198.
- Reicher, S. (1996) "Social identity and social change: Rethinking the context of social psychology". In W.P. Robinson (Ed.) Social groups and identities: Developing the legacy of Henri Tajfel (pp. 317–336). London: Butterworth.
- "'The Battle of Westminster': Developing the social identity model of crowd behaviour to explain the initiation and development of collective conflict" (PDF). European Journal of Social Psychology. 26: 115–134. 1996. Archived from the original (PDF) on 23 December 2010.
- Reicher S. D., & Hopkins, N. (1996). "Seeking influence through characterising self-categories: An analysis of anti-abortionist rhetoric". British Journal of Social Psychology, 35, 297–311.
- Reicher, S. (1996). "The Crowd century: Reconciling practical success with theoretical failure". British Journal of Social Psychology, 35, 535–53.
- Reicher S. D., & Hopkins, N. (1996). "Self-category constructions in political rhetoric; An analysis of Thatcher's and Kinnock's speeches concerning the British miners' strike (1984–85)", European Journal of Social Psychology, 26, 353–371.
- Stott, Clifford; Reicher, Steve (1998). "How conflict escalates: The inter-group dynamics of collective football crowd 'violence'" (PDF). Sociology. 32: 353–377. Archived from the original (PDF) on 4 April 2011.
- Stott, C. & Reicher, S. (1998a). "Crowd action as inter-group process: Introducing the police perspective". European Journal of Social Psychology, 28, 509–529.
- Drury, J. & Reicher, S. (1999). "The intergroup dynamics of collective empowerment: Substantiating the social identity model of crowd behaviour". Group Processes and Intergroup Relations, 2, 381–402.
- Drury, John; Reicher, Steve (2000). "Collective action and psychological change: The emergence of new social identities" (PDF). British Journal of Social Psychology. 39: 579–604. Archived from the original (PDF) on 28 September 2011.
- Reicher, S. (2001). "Studying psychology, studying racism". In M. Augoustinos & K. J. Reynolds. (Eds.), Understanding prejudice, Racism, and Social conflict. London: Sage.
- Reicher, Stephen (2001). "The Psychology of Crowd Dynamics" ( (PDF)). In Hogg, M. A.; Tinsdale, R. S. (eds.). Blackwell handbook of social psychology: Group processes. Oxford: Blackwell Publishing. pp. 182–208. Archived from the original on 4 April 2011.
- Stott, C., Hutchison, P. & Drury, J. (2001). "'Hooligans' abroad? Inter-group dynamics, social identity and participation in collective 'disorder' at the 1998 World Cup Finals". British Journal of Social Psychology, 40, 359–384.
- Reicher, S. D. & Hopkins, N. (2001). Self and nation: Categorization, contestation and mobilisation. London: Sage.
- Drury, J., Reicher, S. & Stott, C. (2003) "Transforming the boundaries of collective identity: From the 'local' anti-road campaign to 'global' resistance?" Social Movement Studies, 2, 191–212.
- Drury, J., Cocking, C., Beale, J., Hanson, C. & Rapley, F. (2005). "The phenomenology of empowerment in collective action". British Journal of Social Psychology, 44, 309–328.
- Reicher, S. D., Haslam, S. A., & Hopkins, N. (2005). "Social identity and the dynamics of leadership: Leaders and followers as collaborative agents in the transformation of social reality". Leadership Quarterly. 16, 547–568.
- Drury, John; Reicher, Steve (2005). "Explaining enduring empowerment: A comparative study of collective action and psychological outcomes" (PDF). European Journal of Social Psychology. 35: 35–58. doi:10.1002/ejsp.231. Archived from the original (PDF) on 25 January 2011.
- Reicher, Stephen; Haslam, S. Alexander (2006). "Rethinking the psychology of tyranny: The BBC Prison Experiment" (PDF). British Journal of Social Psychology. 45: 1–40. Archived from the original (PDF) on 4 April 2011.
- Reicher, Stephen; Haslam, S. Alexander; Rath, Rakshi (2008). "Making a Virtue of Evil: A Five-Step Social Identity Model of the Development of Collective Hate" (PDF). Social and Personality Psychology Compass. 2 (3): 1313–1344. doi:10.1111/j.1751-9004.2008.00113.x. ISSN 1751-9004. S2CID 145542609.
- Haslam, S.A; Reicher, S.D. & Platow, M.J. (2010) The New Psychology Of Leadership: Identity, Influence And Power, New York: Psychology Press

== Awards and distinctions ==
- 2004 - Fellow of the Royal Society of Edinburgh (FRSE)
- 2018 - Fellow of the British Academy (FBA)
- 2021 - Honorary Fellow, British Psychological Society (HonFBPsS)

He was interviewed by Jim Al-Khalili for The Life Scientific's first broadcast on BBC Radio 4 in March 2018.
