= Jolanda Jetten =

Dutch social psychologist (born 1970)

Jolanda Jetten FASSA
- Born: 19 April 1970 (age 56); Simpelveld, Netherlands

Academic background
- Education: University of Amsterdam (PhD)
- Thesis: Dimensions of distinctiveness: intergroup discrimination and social identity (1997)
- Doctoral advisor: Russell Spears
- Other advisor: Antony Manstead

Academic work
- Discipline: Psychologist
- Sub-discipline: Social psychology
- Institutions: University of Exeter; University of Queensland
- Main interests: Social identity; Social groups; Group dynamics

Petronella Antonia Gerarda "Jolanda" Jetten FASSA (born 19 April 1970, Simpelveld) is a Dutch social psychologist and a professor at the University of Queensland. She won the Spearman Medal in 2004 and was inducted into the Academy of the Social Sciences in Australia in 2015. Her research concerns social identity, social groups, and group dynamics.

== Career ==
Jetten attended Radboud University Nijmegen and received a PhD from the University of Amsterdam in 1997. She then moved to Australia to become a postdoctoral fellow at the University of Queensland in 1998. She remained there until 2001, when she relocated to the United Kingdom to join the faculty of the University of Exeter, where she was promoted from lecturer to professor in 2004. She returned to the University of Queensland in 2007 as a research fellow and is now a professor of social psychology.

Jetten's primary area of research is social identity, social groups, and group dynamics. She has studied how identity changes in response to stigma and oppression, the transition of identity throughout life, and the implications of social identity on general health. She has co-edited several books: Individuality and the Group (2006), Rebels in Groups (2011), and The Social Cure (2012). She and Frank Mols authored the 2017 book The Wealth Paradox: Economic Prosperity and the Hardening of Attitudes.

Jetten won the Spearman Medal, a mid-career award given annually by the British Psychological Society, in 2004. In 2014, she was awarded the European Association of Social Psychology's Kurt Lewin Medal. She was made a fellow of the Academy of the Social Sciences in Australia in 2015, and held an Australian Research Council Future Fellowship from 2012 to 2016. She is a past president of the Society of Australasian Social Psychologists and a past member of the Australian Research Council College of Experts. She has edited numerous journals in the field of social psychology; she was the co-editor in chief of the British Journal of Social Psychology from 2009 to 2014, and is the co-editor in chief of Social Issues and Policy Review from 2017 until 2020. In 2018, she was awarded an Australian Laureate Fellowship.
