= Kevin Connolly =

Kevin Connolly may refer to:

- Kevin Connolly (actor) (born 1974), American actor
- Kevin Michael Connolly (born 1985), American photographer
- Kevin Connolly (writer) (born 1962), Canadian poet, editor and critic
- Kevin M. Connolly (born 1974), American voice actor
- Kevin J. Connolly (1937–2015), British psychologist
- Kevin Connolly (hurler) (born 1991), Irish hurler
- Kevin Connolly (racehorse trainer) in 1990 Epsom Derby

== See also ==
- Kevin Connelly, comedian
- Kevin Conolly, an Australian politician
