= Paul Lange =

Paul Lange may refer to:

- Paul Lange (musician) (1857–1919), German musician
- Paul Lange (canoeist) (1931–2016), German sprint canoer
- Paul Lange, co-founder of Lobotomy Software
- Paul de Lange (born 1981), Dutch footballer

== See also ==
- Paul van Lange (born 1961), Dutch psychologist
