= British Journal of Clinical Psychology =

- Discipline: Clinical psychology
- Language: English
- Edited by: Bethany Wootton

Publication details
- Former names: British Journal of Social and Clinical Psychology
- History: 1981–present
- Publisher: Wiley-Blackwell on behalf of the British Psychological Society (United Kingdom)
- Frequency: Quarterly
- Impact factor: 2.672 (2018)

Standard abbreviations
- ISO 4: Br. J. Clin. Psychol.

Indexing
- CODEN: BJCPDW
- ISSN: 0144-6657
- OCLC no.: 07198489

Links
- Journal homepage; Online access

The British Journal of Clinical Psychology is a medical journal published by Wiley-Blackwell on behalf of the British Psychological Society covering topics in clinical psychology. It was established in 1981, when the British Journal of Social and Clinical Psychology split in two parts, the other being British Journal of Social Psychology. The editor-in-chief is Bethany Wootton. According to the Journal Citation Reports, the journal has a 2018 impact factor of 2.672, ranking it 38th out of 130 journals in the category "Psychology, Clinical".
