= Leverhulme Medal =

Leverhulme Medal may refer to:

- Leverhulme Medal (Royal Society), awarded by the Royal Society
- Leverhulme Medal (British Academy), awarded by the British Academy
