= Michelle K. Ryan =

Professor of social and organisational psychology

Michelle K. Ryan FASSA
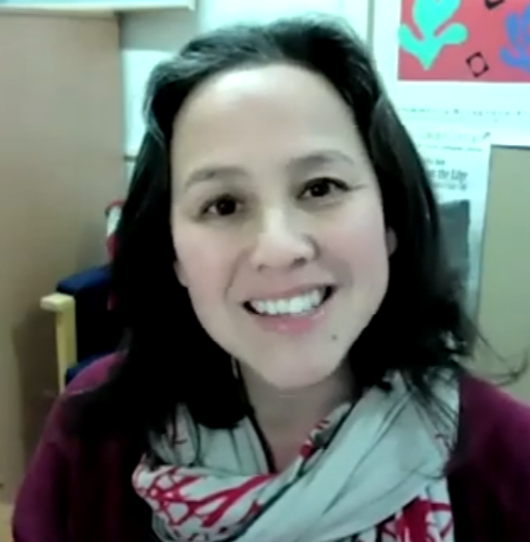
- Ryan In an online discussion in 2021
- Born: Michelle Kim Ryan; March 1973 (age 53)

Academic background
- Education: Australian National University
- Thesis: A gendered self or a gendered context? A self-categorization appraisal of gender differences. (2003)

Academic work
- Discipline: Social psychology
- Sub-discipline: Feminist psychology, Gender studies
- Institutions: University of Exeter; University of Groningen (visiting); Australian National University
- Main interests: Diversity; Gender inequalities in the workplace
- Notable ideas: Glass cliff

Michelle Kim Ryan (born March 1973) is an Australian psychologist and academic, whose research focuses on gender and gender differences. As of 2024 she is professor of social and organisational psychology at the University of Exeter. She is known for coining the term "glass cliff" with co-researcher Alex Haslam, to describe how the experiences of women who have broken through the glass ceiling differ from those of their male counterparts.

== Early life and education ==
Michelle Kim Ryan was born in March 1973.

She completed her undergraduate and a Ph.D. study in psychology from Australian National University in 2004 for her thesis A gendered self or a gendered context? A self-categorization appraisal of gender differences.

== Career ==
Ryan was professor of social and organisational psychology at the University of Exeter.

In 2007 she undertook a visiting professorship at the University of Groningen in The Netherlands.

Since July 2021, Ryan has been director of the Global Institute for Women's Leadership at the Australian National University, founded and chaired by former Australian Prime Minister Julia Gillard.

== Research ==
Ryan research focuses on gender and gender differences, particularly the impact of gender in the workplace.

Together with Alex Haslam, she coined the term "glass cliff" to describe how the experiences of women who have broken through the glass ceiling differ from those of their male counterparts.

== Fellowships and other activity ==
In 2004 Ryan was awarded a Research Councils UK academic fellowship.

She was associate editor of the British Journal of Social Psychology between 2010 and 2012.

In 2014 she undertook a British Academy Mid-Career Fellowship to examine the role of identity in explaining perceptions of work-life balance. At the University of Exeter she held the roles of Faculty Associate Dean (Research), Dean of Post-graduate Research and inaugural Director of the Exeter Doctoral College. Ryan presented her work on work-life balance at TEDx Exeter in 2015.

She was awarded a European Research Council Consolidator Grant examining the way in which context and identity shape and constrain women’s careers.

== Recognition ==
In 2006, Ryan was a runner-up in the ESRC's Michael Young Prize (2006).

Haslam and Ryan's research into the glass cliff was shortlisted for the Times Higher Education Supplement Research Project of the Year in 2005, and in 2008 their idea was named by the New York Times as one of the ideas that shaped 2008.

The term "glass cliff" was shortlisted as Word of the Year by the Oxford English Dictionary in 2016.

Ryan was elected a Fellow of the Academy of the Social Sciences in Australia in 2025.

== Selected publications ==
- Ryan MK, Branscombe NR (2012). The Sage Handbook of Gender and Psychology., Sage.
- Barreto M, Ryan MK, Schmitt M (2009). The Glass Ceiling in the 21st Century: Understanding Barriers to Gender Equality, APA.
- Ryan MK, Haslam, S.A. Wilson-Kovacs, M.D. Hersby, M.D. (2007). The Glass Cliff: Precariousness beyond the Glass Ceiling. A CIPD Executive Briefing. London, Chartered Institute of Personnel and Development.
- Ryan MK, Haslam SA, Morgenroth T, Rink F, Stoker J, Peters K (2016). Getting on top of the glass cliff: Reviewing a decade of evidence, Explanations, and impact. Leadership Quarterly, 27(3), 446–455.
- Morgenroth T, Ryan MK, Peters K (2015). The motivational theory of role modeling: How role models influence role aspirants' goals. Review of General Psychology, 19(4), 465–483.
- Steffens NK, Haslam SA, Reicher SD, Platow MJ, Fransen K, Yang J, Ryan MK, Jetten J, Peters K, Boen F, et al (2014). Leadership as social identity management: Introducing the Identity Leadership Inventory (ILI) to assess and validate a four-dimensional model. Leadership Quarterly, 25(5), 1001–1024.
