= Pascal Gygax =

Swiss psycholinguist known for work on inclusive language in French

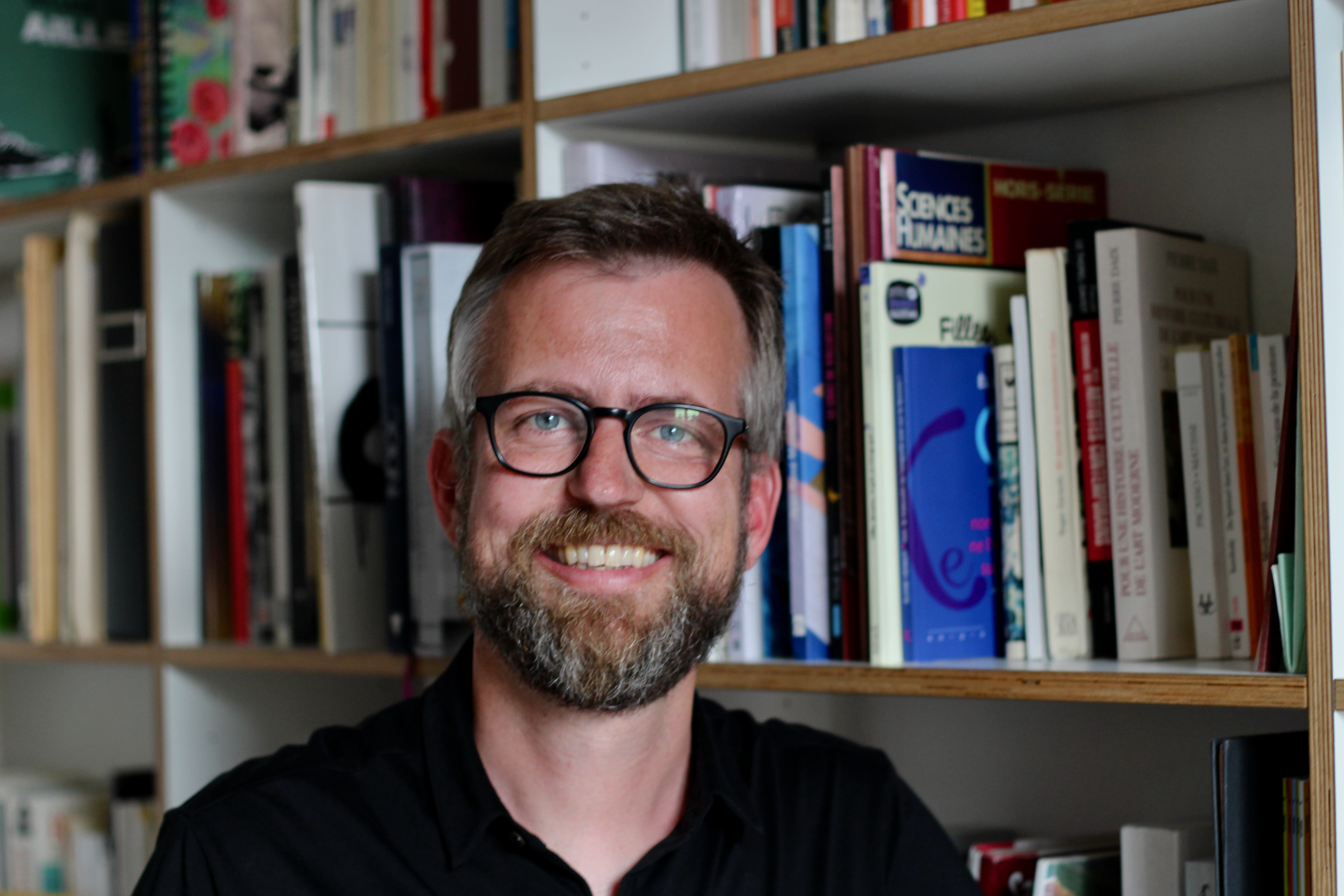
- Born: 1974 (age 51–52)
- Occupation: Psycholinguist
- Known for: Processing of inclusive language

Pascal Mark Gygax, born December 17, 1974 in Evilard/Leubringen (Bern), is a Swiss psycholinguist, specializing in inclusive language in French. He is the cofounder and director of the Psycholinguistics and Applied Social Psychology Group at the University of Fribourg.

== Biography ==
Pascal Gygax was born on December 17, 1974 in Evilard/Leubringen, in the Canton of Bern. He has an older sister. His father is a microtechnology engineer from a family of watchmakers and his mother is English.

He grew up in Biel/Bienne, where he lived until the age of 20. In 1992, he was the Swiss Junior Interclubs Champion in tennis. He also coaches the Swiss wheelchair tennis team.

Gygax studied mathematics for a year at university, after which he studied psychology in England beginning in 1995. He earned a bachelor's degree in psychology in 1998 from the University of Derby, a Master's degree in sports psychology and exercise the following year at the University of Liverpool, and a doctorate degree in experimental psychology under the supervision of Jane Oakhill and Alan Garnham at the University of Sussex in 2002.

Gygax regularly gives interviews with Romandy media about matters of inclusive language.

He is in a relationship with Sandrine Moeschler, the head of mediation of the Cantonal Museum of Fine Arts of Lausanne. They have one daughter, born in 2009. They live in Lausanne.

== Academic background and research ==
In 2002, he returned to Switzerland, where the next year he co-founded and directed the Psycholinguistics and Applied Social Psychology Group in the Department of Psychology at the University of Fribourg.

He began working on the issue of gender in 2004 with social psychologist Ute Gabriel, specializing in the study of inclusive language in French from the perspective of links between language and thought. He explores how language is an unconscious vector of inequalities from a very early age. His experiments show in particular a cognitive bias in favour of the masculine when interpreting the generic masculine, a bias that contributes to an androcentric view of society.

He obtained about 20 national and international funding sources for his research on gender equality. In 2016, he launched the Fair Language project, aiming to raise funds for continuing research on language's impact on inequalities and the possible interventions to remedy them.

He was also the co-author in 2010 of a study about the lack of impact on young people of warnings against smoking that appear on cigarette packaging.

For his work as a whole, he received the Marcel Benoist Prize 2024, the most prestigious scientific award in Switzerland, considered to be the Swiss Nobel Prize.
