= Fabio Sani =

Social psychologist

- Born: 1961 (age 64–65)
- Education: University of Florence; London School of Economics; University of Exeter (PhD)
- Scientific career
- Fields: Social and health psychology
- Workplaces: University of Dundee
- Thesis: The social psychology of schisms (1996)
- Doctoral advisor: Steve Reicher
- Website: www.dundee.ac.uk/psychology/staff/profile/fabio-sani.php

Fabio Sani (born 1961) is a professor of social and health psychology at the University of Dundee, in Scotland.

== Education ==
Sani completed his undergraduate degree in Pedagogy at the University of Florence in 1986. Subsequently, he obtained a Master of Science degree in social psychology at the London School of Economics in 1991, and his PhD in psychology at the University of Exeter in 1995, with a research project on schisms within social groups supervised by Steve Reicher.

== Career and research ==
After spending one year working as a postdoctoral research fellow at the University of Surrey, he moved to the University of Dundee in 1996. He has held visiting positions at the Australian National University (2000), the University of Bari (2002), the University of Pittsburgh (2004), and the University of Queensland (2014).

Sani's research mainly concerns group psychology, social identity, and the psycho-social determinants of health and illness. He has explored issues of schisms in religious and political groups, perceptions of historical and cultural continuity among members of ethnic and national groups, and the development of social identity in children and adolescents. In recent years, Sani's research has focused on group identification and health. More specifically, he is investigating the extent to which one's subjective sense of identification with groups such as the family, the community, and the workplace impacts upon mental and physical health. He was the Principal Investigator on the Health in Groups Project, a cross-national and longitudinal study investigating the effects of group life on various health indicators, funded by the Economic and Social Research Council (ESRC) of the UK.

Sani has published numerous scientific articles, and co-authored and edited four books, including a social psychology textbook published by McGraw-Hill. He has been an associate editor of the European Journal of Social Psychology.

=== Publications ===
- Myers, D.; Abell, J. & Sani, F. (2014). Social Psychology (2nd Ed.). Boston: McGraw Hill Higher Education. ISBN 978-0-07-712178-5.
- Sani, F.; Todman, J. B. (2006). Experimental Design and Statistics for Psychology: A First Course. Blackwell Publishing Limited. ISBN 978-1-4051-0024-3. (Greek translation published by Πεδίο, in 2009; Korean translation published by Si Geumapeureseu in 2011).
- Sani, F. (2008). Self Continuity: Individual and Collective Perspectives. East Sussex: Psychology Press. ISBN 978-0-8058-5701-6.
- Bennett, M.; Sani, F. (2004). The Development of the Social Self. East Sussex: Psychology Press. ISBN 978-1-84169-294-4.
- Sani, F.; Madhok, V.; Norbury, M.; Dugard, P.; Wakefield, J. R. H. (2015). "Greater number of group identifications is associated with lower odds of being depressed: Evidence from a Scottish community sample". Social Psychiatry and Psychiatric Epidemiology. 50 (9): 1389–1397. doi:10.1007/s00127-015-1076-4. PMID 26058588.
- Miller, K.; Wakefield, J.R.H.; Sani, F. (2015). "Identification with social groups is associated with mental health in adolescents: Evidence from a Scottish community sample" (PDF). Psychiatry Research. 228 (3): 340–346. doi:10.1016/j.psychres.2015.05.088. PMID 26163720. S2CID 9398398.
- Sani, F.; Herrera, M.; Bowe, M. (2009). "Perceived collective continuity and ingroup identification as defence against death awareness" (PDF). Journal of Experimental Social Psychology. 45: 242–245. doi:10.1016/j.jesp.2008.07.019. S2CID 113406801.
- Wakefield, J. R. H.; Bickley, S.; Sani, F. (2013). "The effects of identification with a support group on the mental health of people with multiple sclerosis" (PDF). Journal of Psychosomatic Research. 74 (5): 420–426. doi:10.1016/j.jpsychores.2013.02.002. PMID 23597330.
- Sani, F.; Bowe, M.; Herrera, M.; Manna, C.; Cossa, T.; Miao, X.; Zhou, Y. (2007). "Perceived collective continuity: Seeing groups as entities that move through time". European Journal of Social Psychology. 37 (6): 1118–1134. doi:10.1002/ejsp.430.
- Bennett, M.; Lyons, E.; Sani, F.; Barrett, M. (1998). "Children's subjective identification with the group and in-group favoritism". Developmental Psychology. 34 (5): 902–9. doi:10.1037/0012-1649.34.5.902. PMID 9779737.
