= John Drury (psychologist) =

British academic

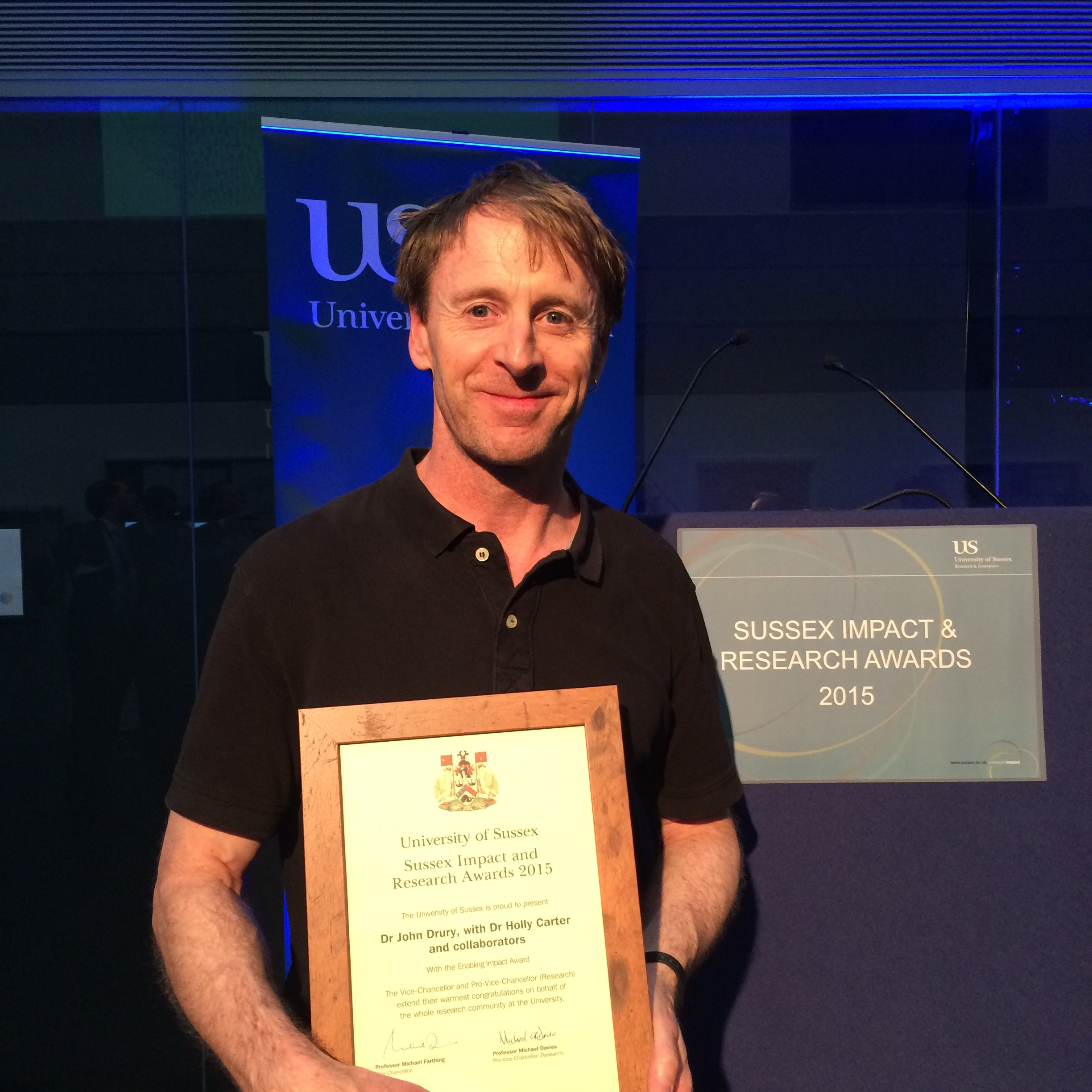

Academic background
- Education: University of Exeter
- Thesis: Collective action and psychological change (1996)
- Doctoral advisor: Stephen Reicher

Academic work
- Institutions: University of Sussex

John Drury is a Professor of Social Psychology at the University of Sussex. His core research is in the area of crowd psychology.

== Career ==
Drury completed his undergraduate degree in social psychology at the University of Sussex (1992). He went on to complete his MSc (1993) and PhD (1996) in Psychology at the University of Exeter, under the supervision of Professor Steve Reicher. On completing his PhD, Drury worked as a Research Psychologist at the Trust for the Study of Adolescence (later known as Young People in Focus) from 1996 to 1998, providing research-based evidence about communication between young people and adults. He joined the faculty at the University of Sussex in 1998, where he continued his research in crowd behaviour.

Drury, as well as his direct University of Sussex colleague Stephen Reicher, are both participants in the Sage subcommittee advising on behavioural science during the COVID-19 pandemic.

In 2022, Drury advised the Department of Digital, Culture, Media and Sport on anticipated crowd behavior during Queen Elizabeth II's funeral and lying-in-state. His advice addressed the composition and behavior of the crowds, perceptions of fairness in queue management, and communication about the expected waiting times.

== Research in crowd behaviour ==
The core of Drury's research is on the processes of crowd conflict and psychological change in relation to direct action events. This research stems from, and contributed to the development of, the social identity tradition. His work includes research on the processes of crowd conflict and change in relation to anti-poll tax protests, anti-roads direct actions, anti-capitalist events, and football crowds. Along with his colleagues, Professor Steve Reicher and Dr Clifford Stott, Drury identified causes of conflict within crowd events, and how these conflicts can escalate into riots. This research expanded on the social identity theory and Reicher's Social Identity Model, and led to the Elaborated Social Identity Model (ESIM). The ESIM challenges the traditional notion of the crowd as being inherently violent and irrational, and suggests that people in a crowd act in relation to their shared social identity.

More recently, Drury’s research has examined how participants may feel empowered through crowd experiences, and how such positive emotions might affect other areas of their lives. A large-scale interview study led by Drury found that the act of protesting itself can be good for you, due to the feelings of encouragement and confidence emerging from experiences of collective action. The main factors contributing to the sense of empowerment included the realisation of the collective identity and shared expectations of mutual support.

== From crowd events to mass emergency behaviour ==
Drury also has research interests in the psychology of mass emergency behaviour (MEB). Early models of MEB suggested that in situations of collective threat, the generic reaction from people is one of mass panic. However, in the research literature there are many examples of rational behaviour when escaping threatening and dangerous situations, for example co-operation and helping behaviours. Drury’s research study carried out in the aftermath of the London bombings of 7 July 2005 showed that rather than panicking or acting selfishly, the majority of survivors acted with courtesy and respect towards their fellow survivors, and in many cases also acted as the first responders to an emergency.

== Key publications ==
Journal articles

- Drury, J., Stott, C., Ball, R., Barr, D., Bell, L., Reicher, S., & Neville, F. (2022). How riots spread between cities: Introducing the police pathway. Political Psychology, 43(4), 651-669.
- Barr, D., Drury, J., & Choudhury, S. (2022). Understanding collective flight responses to (mis) perceived hostile threats in Britain 2010-2019: a systematic review of ten years of false alarms in crowded spaces. Journal of Risk Research, 1-19.
- Tekin, S., & Drury, J. (2022). A critical discursive psychology approach to understanding how disaster victims are delegitimized by hostile Twitter posts: Racism, victim‐blaming, and forms of attack following the Grenfell Tower fire. Journal of Community & Applied Social Psychology, 32(5), 908-922.
- Drury, J., Stancombe, J., Williams, R., Collins, H., Lagan, L., Barrett, A., ... & Chitsabesan, P. (2022). Survivors’ experiences of informal social support in coping and recovering after the 2017 Manchester Arena bombing. BJPsych open, 8(4).
- Drury, J., & Stokoe, E. (2022). The interactional production and breach of new norms in the time of COVID‐19: Achieving physical distancing in public spaces. British Journal of Social Psychology, 61(3), 971-990.
- Hoerst, C., & Drury, J. (2021). Social norms misperception among voters in the 2020 US presidential election. Analyses of Social Issues and Public Policy, 21(1), 312-346.
- Barr, D., & Drury, J. (2009). Activist identity as a motivational resource: Dynamics of (dis)empowerment at the G8 direct actions, Gleneagles, 2005. Social Movement Studies, 8, 243–260.
- Drury, J. (2009). Managing crowds in emergencies: Psychology for business continuity. Business Continuity Journal, 3, 14–24.
- Drury, J. (2002). "When the mobs are looking for witches to burn, nobody's safe": Talking about the reactionary crowd. Discourse & Society, 13, 41–73.
- Drury, J., Cocking, C., Beale, J., Hanson, C., & Rapley, F. (2005). The phenomenology of empowerment in collective action. British Journal of Social Psychology, 44, 309–328.
- Drury, J., Cocking, C., & Reicher, S. (2009). Everyone for themselves? A comparative study of crowd solidarity among emergency survivors. British Journal of Social Psychology, 48, 487–506.
- Drury, J., Cocking, C., & Reicher, S. (2009). The nature of collective resilience: Survivor reactions to the 2005 London bombings. International Journal of Mass Emergencies and Disasters, 27, 66–95.
- Drury, J., Cocking, C., Reicher, S., Burton, A., Schofield, D., Hardwick, A., Graham, D., & Langston, P. (2009). Cooperation versus competition in a mass emergency evacuation: A new laboratory simulation and a new theoretical model. Behavior Research Methods, 41, 957–970.
- Drury. J., & Reicher, S. (2010). 'Crowd control': How we avoid mass panic. Scientific American Mind, November/December 2010, 58–65.
- Drury, J., & Reicher, S. (2009). Collective psychological empowerment as a model of social change: Researching crowds and power. Journal of Social Issues, 65, 707–725.
- Drury, J., & Reicher, S. (2005). Explaining enduring empowerment: A comparative study of collective action and psychological outcomes. European Journal of Social Psychology, 35, 35–58.
- Drury, J., & Reicher, S. (2000). Collective action and psychological change: The emergence of new social identities. British Journal of Social Psychology, 39, 579–604.
- Drury, J., Reicher, S., & Stott, C. (2003). Transforming the boundaries of collective identity: From the "local" anti-road campaign to "global" resistance? Social Movement Studies, 2, 191–212.
- Drury, J., Stott, C., Ball, R., Barr, D., Bell, L., Reicher, S., & Neville, F. (2022). How riots spread between cities: Introducing the police pathway. Political Psychology, 43(4), 651-669.
- Novelli, D., Drury, J., & Reicher, S. (2010). Come together: Two studies concerning the impact of group relations on ‘personal space’. British Journal of Social Psychology, 49, 223–236 doi:10.1348/014466609X449377
- Smith, A., James, C., Jones, R., Langston, P., Lester, E., & Drury, J. (2009). Modelling contra-flow in crowd dynamics DEM simulation. Safety Science, 47, 395–404.
- Williams, R., & Drury, J. (2009). Psychosocial resilience and its influence on managing mass emergencies and disasters. Psychiatry, 8, 293–296. doi:10.1016/j.mppsy.2009.04.019
