= Spearman Medal =

The Spearman Medal was an early-career award of the British Psychological Society's Research Board, given in recognition of outstanding published work in psychology which represented a significant body of work in terms of theoretical contributions, originality, and impact. The award was inaugurated in 1965 and is named in honour of Charles Spearman. Medal winners were invited to give the Spearman Medal Lecture at the society's annual conference.

In 2021, it was decided to retire this award in view of concern at the links Spearman had with the eugenics movement.

== List of medal winners ==
Source: British Psychology Society

Year	Medal winner
1965	Anne Treisman
1966	-
1967	Alan Cowey
1968	-
1969	Peter B. Warr
1970	Kevin J. Connolly
1971	-
1972	-
1973	Susan Iversen
1974	Philip N. Johnson-Laird
1975	David J. Wood
1976	Edmund Rolls
1977	-
1978	Howard Giles
1979	-
1980	Gregory V. Jones
1981	Trevor W. Robbins
1982	Andrew W. Ellis
1983	-
1984	Geoffrey Beattie
1985	Charles Hulme
1986	Glyn W. Humphreys
1987	Miles Hewstone
1988	Stephen B. Dunnett
1989	Susan E. Gathercole
1990	Simon Baron-Cohen
1991	Jane Oakhill
1992	Usha Goswami
1993	Peter W. Halligan
1994	Jonathon Driver
1995	Michael Oaksford
1996	Nick Chater
1997	Neil Macrae
1998	Francesca Happé
1999	Simon Killcross
2000	Kate Nation
2001	Gregory R. Maio
2002	Thalia C. Eley
2003	-
2004	Jolanda Jetten
2005	Padraic Monaghan
2006	Sarah-Jayne Blakemore and Richard J. Crisp
2007	Christopher Chambers
2008	Tom Manly
2009	Matt Field
2010	Emily A. Holmes
2011	Essi Viding
2012	Angelica Ronald
2013	Jonathan Roiser
2014	Roi Cohen Kadosh
2015	Iroise Dumontheil
2016	Michael Banissy
2017	Rachael Jack (University of Glasgow) and Claire Haworth (University of Bristol)
2018	Aidan Horner
2019	Stephen Fleming
2020	Richard Cook

== See also ==
- List of psychology awards
- List of awards named after people
