= Marie Johnston =

British psychologist

- Born: 6 July 1944 (age 82); Aberdeen
- Education: University of Aberdeen, University of Hull
- Awards: Fellow of the Academy of Medical Sciences, Fellow of the Royal Society of Edinburgh, Honorary Fellow, British Psychological Society
- Scientific career
- Fields: Health psychology
- Workplaces: University of London, University of Aberdeen
- Thesis: Responsiveness of delinquents and non-delinquents to social reinforcement (1970)
- Doctoral advisor: Donald C. Kendrick

Marie Johnston FMedSci FRSE FRCPE is a British psychologist who specialises in health psychology. She is an Emeritus Professor at the University of Aberdeen.

== Biography ==
After getting her BSc at the University of Aberdeen, Johnston later moved to the University of Hull, where she obtained her PhD in 1970. After working at the University of Oxford as a postdoctoral fellow (1970-1977). she worked as a lecturer at the Royal Free and University College Medical School from 1977 until 1990, when she moved to the University of St Andrews and became a professor. While at St Andrews, she was appointed Chair of Psychology in 1992. In 2003, she moved to the University of Aberdeen and remained professor until 2011, when she was promoted to emeritus professor.

As an academic, Johnston specialises in health psychology. She has also served as chair of the British Psychological Society (BPS) Health Psychology division (1986) and as president of the European Health Psychology Society (1992). In 1994, she was awarded the BPS's Presidents' Award for Distinguished Contributions to Psychological Knowledge. She has also authored or edited several books related to health psychology.

Johnston was elected Fellow of the Academy of Medical Sciences and Fellow of the Royal Society of Edinburgh in 1998. She was elected Fellow of the Academy of Learned Societies for the Social Sciences in 2000. She was appointed Fellow of the European Health Psychology Society in 2005. In addition to her 1988 regular fellowship, she was elected Honorary Fellow of the British Psychological Society in 2011. She is also a Fellow of the Royal College of Physicians of Edinburgh.
