= National Association for Female Executives =

The National Association for Female Executives (NAFE), is a division of the Working Mother Media, based in New York City. Established in 1972, NAFE is an organization of businesswomen in the United States. It offers education, training, skills development, and networking to women in the business world. NAFE has over 60,000 members. The average NAFE member supervises approximately five people at work, and has at minimum a four-year college degree. NAFE also publishes a quarterly magazine for its members.

== See also ==
- Glass cliff
- List of female top executives
