= Claire Haworth =

Claire Haworth is a British psychologist. She is a Professor of Behavioural Genetics and co-director of the Dynamic Genetics Lab at the University of Bristol.

== Education ==
Haworth graduated from the University of Oxford with a degree in experimental psychology. She completed her MSc and PhD at King's College London.

== Career ==
Haworth received two funded fellowships following her PhD; an interdisciplinary fellowship from the Medical Research Council and Economic and Social Research Council, and a research fellowship from the British Academy. She worked in academic positions at King's College London and the University of Warwick. In 2015 she joined the University of Bristol.

Haworth has contributed expert opinion to BBC documentaries, and has appeared on the BBC Radio 4 programme Woman's Hour, as well as Sky News and BBC World Service.

Her research interests are in the influence of genes and environment in human lives.

=== Awards ===
Haworth was awarded the British Psychological Society's Spearman Medal in 2017 for outstanding published work in psychology. She was joint winner that year with Dr Rachael Jack of the University of Glasgow. Haworth was nominated for the prize by Professor Chris Jarrold, Head of the School of Experimental Psychology at the University of Bristol.

She was awarded the Philip Leverhulme Prize in Psychology in 2018.
