= Angelica Ronald =

British psychologist

- Known for: Research in Autistic spectrum disorders, attention deficit hyperactivity disorder, twin and family studies, genetic influences on development
- Awards: Spearman Medal from the British Psychological Society, Thompson award from the Behavior Genetics Association

Angelica Ronald is a Professor of Psychology and Genetics at the Centre for Brain and Cognitive Development within the Department of Psychological Sciences at Birkbeck, University of London, where she is the director of the Genes Environment Lifespan (GEL) laboratory. Angelica Ronald is also a visiting Senior Lecturer at the Institute of Psychiatry, Psychology and Neuroscience, King's College London. She has been awarded the Spearman Medal from the British Psychological Society and the Thompson award from the Behavior Genetics Association for her research.

Ronald's interests and publications include Autistic spectrum disorders, attention deficit hyperactivity disorder, twin and family studies, and genetic influences on development.

== Publications ==
- Behavior genetics of psychopathology, 2014
