= Emily A. Holmes =

Clinical psychologist and neuroscientist

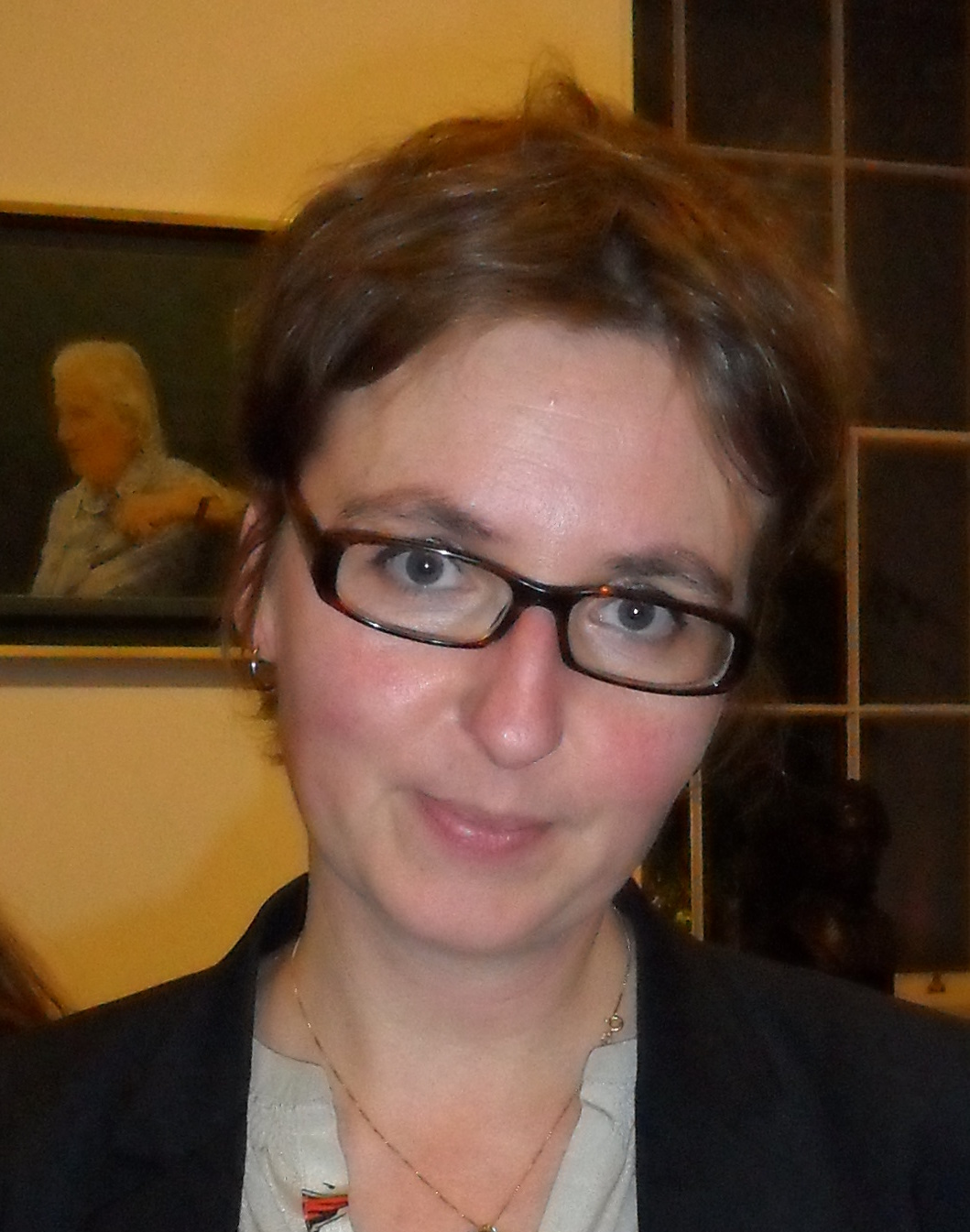
- Emily Holmes (2012).
- Occupation: Professor of Clinical Neuroscience
- Awards: APA Distinguished Early Career Award (2014)

Academic background
- Education: University of Oxford; Uppsala University; Royal Holloway, University of London; University of Cambridge

Academic work
- Institutions: Karolinska Institutet, University of Oxford, Uppsala University

Emily A. Holmes (born 1971 in Surrey, England) is an English clinical psychologist and neuroscientist known for her research on mental imagery in relation to psychological treatments for post traumatic stress disorder (PTSD), bipolar disorder, and depression. Holmes is professor at the department of Women's and Children's Health at Uppsala University. She also holds an appointment as Honorary Professor of Clinical Psychology at the University of Oxford.

The British Psychological Society awarded Holmes the May Davidson Award in 2007 and Spearman Medal in 2010. Holmes also received the Comenius Early Career Psychologist Award from the European Federation of Psychologists' Associations in 2011 and the Humboldt Foundation Friedrich Wilhelm Bessel Research Award in 2013.

In 2014, she received the American Psychological Association's Award for Distinguished Scientific Early Career Contributions to Psychology "for her groundbreaking research into the role of imagery in emotions and emotional disorders [...] that encoding events as mental images—rather than in verbal form—can enhance both the intensity and the duration of emotional consequences."

== Biography ==
Holmes grew up in Surrey, England. She completed a BA in Experimental Psychology at the University of Oxford in 1993. The following year she obtained a master's degree in Social Science at the Institute of Psychology, Uppsala University in Sweden, where she worked with Gunnar Jansson on haptic/tactile perception in blind individuals. She then attended art college for a year and followed this up by spending several years in New York. During this time she worked at the Metropolitan Museum of Art running touch tours for visitors who were visually impaired and also with homeless people who were not receiving adequate care or support for mental health conditions. The latter experience began to shape the subsequent direction of her life.

Holmes returned to the UK and was accepted on to clinical psychology training. She received her Doctorate in Clinical Psychology at Royal Holloway University of London in 2000, under the supervision of Chris Brewin. Her research with Brewin focused on PTSD and intrusive memories. Holmes received her PhD in Cognitive Neuroscience at the Cambridge University in 2005, mentored by Andrew Mathews. Her research with Mathews demonstrated the role of mental imagery in generating emotional responses.

Holmes was awarded the Royal Society Dorothy Hodgkin Fellowship in 2005 in support of her research at the University of Oxford. In 2010, Holmes was awarded a Wellcome Trust Clinical Fellowship and was appointed Professor of Clinical Psychology at the University of Oxford. From 2012 to 2016 Holmes was a Programme Leader at the MRC Cognition and Brain Sciences unit at Cambridge University.

In her family life she has a partner and child.

In 2022 she was the guest on an episode of The Life Scientific on BBC Radio 4.

== Research ==
Holmes's major interest is in mental imagery, its effect on emotion, and how it can be used in cognitive behavior therapy to increase the effectiveness of treatments for anxiety and mood disorders. With Andrew Matthews, Holmes outlined three different ways that mental imagery alters emotional experiences. First, mental imagery engages the same neurocircuitry that underlies the processing of sensory signals, which serves to direct attention towards potentially threatening stimuli. Second, as a consequence of the overlapping neurocircuitry, one is able to mentally place oneself in an emotionally arousing situation and experience heightened emotions as if the situation were real. Third, the act of remembering past experiences may bring up emotions as if one were reliving the experience (autonoetic consciousness).

Holmes leads the Experimental Psychopathology and Cognitive Therapy Research Group (EPaCT) at the University of Oxford. EPaCT members have developed computerized technologies (including computer games) for psychotherapy to modify people's existing cognitive biases, change negative thinking styles, and reduce the impact of intrusive memories. Holmes is part of a research team aimed at developing inexpensive yet effective therapies to help refugees recover from PTSD and other trauma-related psychological disorders.

== Representative publications ==
- Brewin, C.R.; Holmes, E.A. (2003). "Psychological theories of posttraumatic stress disorder". Clinical Psychology Review. 23 (3): 339–376. doi:10.1016/S0272-7358(03)00033-3. PMID 12729677.
- Holmes, E.A.; Brown, R.J.; Mansell, W.; Fearon, R.P.; Hunter, E.C.; Frasquilho, F.; Oakley, D.A. (2005). "Are there two qualitatively distinct forms of dissociation? A review and some clinical implications". Clinical Psychology Review. 25 (1): 1–23. doi:10.1016/j.cpr.2004.08.006. PMID 15596078.
- Holmes, E.A.; Grey, N.; Young, K.A. (2005). "Intrusive images and "hotspots" of trauma memories in posttraumatic stress disorder: An exploratory investigation of emotions and cognitive themes". Journal of Behavior Therapy and Experimental Psychiatry. 36 (1): 3–17. doi:10.1016/j.jbtep.2004.11.002. PMID 15687006.
- Holmes, Emily A.; James, Ella L.; Coode-Bate, Thomas; Deeprose, Catherine (2009). "Can Playing the Computer Game "Tetris" Reduce the Build-Up of Flashbacks for Trauma? A Proposal from Cognitive Science". PLoS ONE. 4 (1) e4153. Bibcode:2009PLoSO...4.4153H. doi:10.1371/journal.pone.0004153. PMC 2607539. PMID 19127289.
- Holmes, E.A.; Mathews, A. (2010). "Mental imagery in emotion and emotional disorders". Clinical Psychology Review. 30 (3): 349–362. doi:10.1016/j.cpr.2010.01.001. PMID 20116915.
- Holmes, E.A.; Blackwell, S.E.; Heyes, S.B.; Renner, F.; Raes, F. (2016). "Mental imagery in depression: Phenomenology, potential mechanisms, and treatment implications". Annual Review of Clinical Psychology. 12: 249–280. doi:10.1146/annurev-clinpsy-021815-092925. PMID 26772205.
- Hoppe, J.M.; Holmes, E.A.; Agren, T. (2021). "Exploring the neural basis of fear produced by mental imagery: imaginal exposure in individuals fearful of spiders". Philosophical Transactions of the Royal Society B: Biological Sciences. 376 (1817). doi:10.1098/rstb.2019.0690. PMC 7741089. PMID 33308073.
