= Jane Oakhill =

British cognitive psychologist

- Occupation: Professor of Experimental Psychology
- Awards: British Psychological Society Spearman Medal (1991); Society for Text and Discourse Distinguished Scientific Contribution Award (2019)

Academic background
- Education: University of Sussex

Academic work
- Institutions: University of Sussex

Jane Oakhill is a British cognitive psychologist and expert on the development of reading comprehension. She holds the position of Professor of Experimental Psychology at the University of Sussex.

Oakhill was awarded the British Psychological Society Spearman Medal for early career research contributions in 1991. In 2019, she received the Distinguished Scientific Contribution Award from the Society for Text and Discourse in 2019 in recognition of her decades-long research program on children's reading difficulties. Other awards include the 2016 Research Impact Award from the University of Sussex.

Oakhill has served on the Governing Board of Society for Text and Discourse and on the Editorial Board of Discourse Processes.

== Biography ==
Oakhill received her Bachelor's degree in Biological Sciences and Education from the University of Sussex. She became a primary school teacher for two years where her experiences working with young readers sparked an interest in children’s reading comprehension problems. Reflecting on her research journey, Oakhill stated, "it occurred to me that my observations about discrepancies between children’s word reading and text comprehension competence could make for an interesting research topic."

Oakhill returned to the University of Sussex to pursue a PhD in the Laboratory of Experimental Psychology, which was headed by Stuart Sutherland. Oakhill completed her dissertation on children's reading comprehension, under the supervision of Philip Johnson-Laird, in 1981. After graduating, she worked for several years with Johnson-Laird on studies of deductive reasoning and discourse comprehension.

After joining the faculty of the University of Sussex as a lecturer in 1990, Oakhill's primary research focus shifted back to reading comprehension and how children draw inferences while processing text.

== Research ==
Oakhill has had a prolific career researching how children learn to read, make inferences, and comprehend text. Her research program has been influenced by conversations with children and educators, and has led to the development of improved methods and curriculum for teaching children how to read and learn, especially in the United Kingdom. Oakhill distilled critical insights from her research into a set of key points. First, teachers should model processes of analysis and inference and engage their students in discussion. Second, teachers should ask children what they don't understand in order to encourage metacognition and develop their comprehension monitoring skills. Third, teachers should avoid teaching definitions, as vocabulary should be understood rather than memorized. Oakhill argues that it is inefficient to force memorization, and that reading comprehension is enhanced through oral discussions in which ideas are questioned and debated.

In her keynote address to the European Association for Research on Learning and Instruction, Oakhill summarized key findings from research on reading comprehension. She emphasized that inference making is essential to both understanding vocabulary and reading comprehension. When readers (both adults and children) lack such skills, it affects their ability to understand what they are reading. Poor readers have difficulties thinking beyond the scope of the sentences before them and connecting notions between sentences. Such inference making is necessary to develop a coherent representation or mental model of the text. Oakhill stated that "Comprehension skills need to be taught. They don't just develop in all children." She called for changes in the way reading comprehension is approached.

Oakhill has had long-standing research collaborations with Kate Cain, Alan Garnham, Nicola Yuill, and others. One of her widely-cited longitudinal studies focused on associations between working memory, inference making, comprehension monitoring, and reading comprehension in 8- to 11-year-old children. The researchers found that each of these variables predicted individual differences in reading comprehension at all ages, after controlling for vocabulary knowledge and decoding (word reading) skills. Other work, focusing specifically on children with fluent and accurate word reading who exhibit poor text comprehension, failed to find a single underlying factor that would explain the children's reading difficulties.

== Books ==
- Cain, K., & Oakhill, J. (Eds.). (2008). Children's comprehension problems in oral and written language: A cognitive perspective. Guilford Press.
- Cornoldi, C., & Oakhill, J. V. (Eds.). (2013). Reading comprehension difficulties: Processes and intervention. Routledge.
- Garnham, A., & Oakhill, J. (1994). Thinking and reasoning. Basil Blackwell.
- Garnham, A., & Oakhill, J. (Eds.). (2013). Mental models in cognitive science: Essays in honour of Phil Johnson-Laird. Psychology Press.
- Oakhill, J., & Beard, R. (Eds.). (1999). Reading development and the teaching of reading: A psychological perspective. Blackwell Science.
- Oakhill, J., Cain, K., & Elbro, C. (2015). Understanding and teaching reading comprehension: A handbook. Routledge.
- Oakhill, J., & Garnham, A. (1988). Becoming a skilled reader. Basil Blackwell.
- Yuill, N., & Oakhill, J. (1991). Children's problems in text comprehension: An experimental investigation. Cambridge University Press.

== Representative publications ==
- Oakhill, J. (1982). Constructive processes in skilled and less skilled comprehenders' memory for sentences. British Journal of Psychology, 73(1), 13-20. https://doi.org/10.1111/j.2044-8295.1982.tb01785.x
- Oakhill, J. (1984). Inferential and memory skills in children's comprehension of stories. British Journal of Educational Psychology, 54(1), 31-39. https://doi.org/10.1111/j.2044-8279.1984.tb00842.x
- Oakhill, J. V., & Cain, K. (2012). The precursors of reading ability in young readers: Evidence from a four-year longitudinal study. Scientific Studies of Reading, 16(2), 91-121. https://doi.org/10.1080/10888438.2010.529219
- Oakhill, J. V., Cain, K., & Bryant, P. E. (2003). The dissociation of word reading and text comprehension: Evidence from component skills. Language and Cognitive Processes, 18(4), 443-468. https://doi.org/10.1080/01690960344000008
- Oakhill, J., Hartt, J., & Samols, D. (2005). Levels of comprehension monitoring and working memory in good and poor comprehenders. Reading and Writing, 18(7-9), 657-686. https://doi.org/10.1007/s11145-005-3355-z
