= Iroise Dumontheil =

Iroise Dumontheil is Professor of Psychology and Australian Research Council Future Fellow at The University of Melbourne. Her current work focuses on the development of executive control and metacognition.

She was previously Professor of Cognitive Neuroscience at Birkbeck, University of London. and she continues to be a member of the Centre for Educational Neuroscience.

Dumontheil was awarded the Spearman Medal from the British Psychological Society in 2015, for her research in the social cognition and executive functions associated with the rostral prefrontal cortex, particularly in adulthood and their development during adolescence.

== Selected publications ==
- Dumontheil, Iroise; Apperly, I.A.; Blakemore, S.J. (2010), "Online usage of theory of mind continues to develop in late adolescence." (PDF), Developmental Science, 13: 331–338, doi:10.1111/j.1467-7687.2009.00888.x
- Dumontheil, Iroise (2014), "Development of abstract thinking during childhood and adolescence: The role of rostrolateral prefrontal cortex" (PDF), Developmental Cognitive Neuroscience, 10: 57–76, doi:10.1016/j.dcn.2014.07.009
- Dumontheil, Iroise (2016), "Adolescent brain development" (PDF), Current Opinion in Behavioral Sciences, 10: 39–44, doi:10.1016/j.cobeha.2016.04.012, ISSN 2352-1546, S2CID 8211917
- Burgess Paul W.; Gilbert, Sam J.; Dumontheil, Iroise (2007), "Function and localization within rostral prefrontal cortex (area 10)." (PDF), Philosophical Transactions of the Royal Society B: Biological Sciences, 362: 887–899, doi:10.1098/rstb.2007.2095
