= European Review of Social Psychology =

- Discipline: Social psychology
- Language: English
- Edited by: Miles Hewstone; Antony Manstead

Publication details
- History: 1990–present
- Publisher: Psychology Press (Taylor & Francis)
- Frequency: Annual
- Impact factor: 1.389 (2016)

Standard abbreviations
- ISO 4: Eur. Rev. Soc. Psychol.

Indexing
- CODEN: ERSPEW
- ISSN: 1046-3283 (print); 1479-277X (web)
- LCCN: 91650965
- OCLC no.: 1026597105

Links
- Journal homepage; Online access; Online archive

European Review of Social Psychology (ERSP) is an annual peer-reviewed scientific journal which publishes review articles in the field of social psychology. It was established in 1990 and is published by the Taylor & Francis imprint Psychology Press under the auspices of the European Association of Social Psychology. Until 2018, the editors-in-chief were Miles Hewstone (Oxford University) and Antony Manstead (Cardiff University). The current editors-in-chief are Ayşe Üskül (University of Sussex) and Martijn van Zomeren (University of Groningen). According to the Journal Citation Reports, the journal has a 2016 impact factor of 1.389.

Articles published in ERSP typically "review a programme of the author's own research, as evidenced by the author's own papers published in leading peer-reviewed journals." The journal does not publish original empirical studies.
