= Miles Hewstone =

British social psychologist (born 1956)

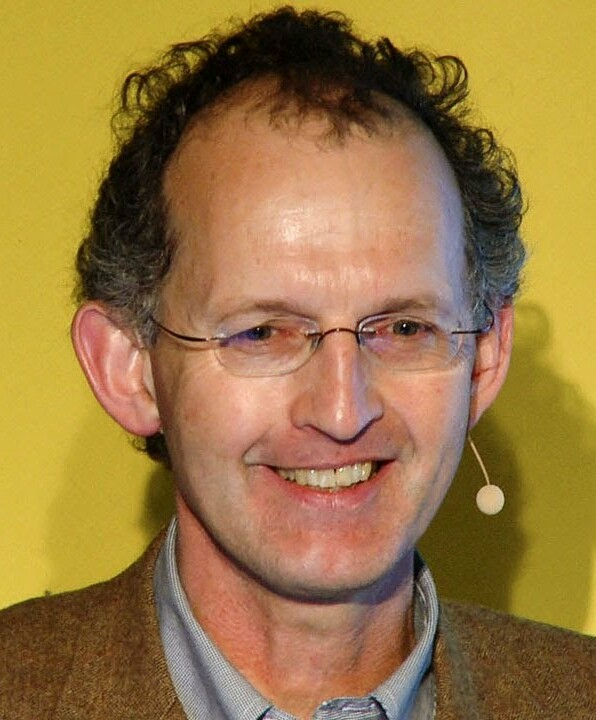
- Miles Hewstone
- Born: United Kingdom
- Scientific career
- Fields: Social Psychology
- Workplaces: Oxford University

Miles Ronald Cole Hewstone (born 4 August 1956) is a British social psychologist who is well known for his work on social relations.

== Biography ==
He graduated from the University of Bristol in 1978 and then moved to the University of Oxford from which he obtained a D.Phil. in social psychology in 1981. He pursued post-doctoral work at the University of Tübingen, Germany from which he obtained a habilitation in 1986. He then undertook further work with Serge Moscovici (in Paris) and Wolfgang Stroebe (in Tübingen).

He held chairs in social psychology at the University of Bristol, University of Mannheim, Germany, and Cardiff University before taking up a chair at the University of Oxford where he was also a Fellow of New College. He has been a Fellow at the Center for Advanced Study in the Behavioral Sciences, Stanford University.

In 2025, an investigation reported that Hewstone had engaged in sexual misconduct and bullying towards female students and junior academics during his tenure at the University of Oxford. The report alleged that Hewstone made unwanted sexual advances, touched women inappropriately, turned up at women's accommodation unannounced, and that Hewstone retaliated against a woman who had rejected his advances.

== Work ==
He has published widely in the field of experimental social psychology. His major topics of research have been: attribution theory, social cognition, social influence, stereotyping and intergroup relations, and intergroup conflict. His current work centres on the reduction of intergroup conflict, via intergroup contact, stereotype change and crossed categorization.

He is a former editor of the British Journal of Social Psychology, and co-founding editor of the European Review of Social Psychology.

== Awards ==
- 1987 - British Psychological Society’s Spearman Medal
- 2001 - British Psychological Society, Presidents’ Award for Distinguished Contributions to Psychological Knowledge
- Fellow of the British Psychological Society
- Fellow of the Society for Personality and Social Psychology
- Fellow of the Society for the Psychological Study of Social Issues
- Fellow of the British Academy
- Fellow of the Academy of Learned Societies for the Social Sciences
- 2003 - Honorary Fellow of the British Psychological Society.

== Books ==
- Understanding attitudes to the European Community: A social psychological study in four member states (Cambridge University Press)
- Causal attribution: From cognitive processes to collective beliefs (Blackwell, 1989)
- Contact and conflict in intergroup encounters (edited with R. Brown; Blackwell, 1986)
- The Blackwell encyclopedia of social psychology (edited with A.S.R. Manstead, 1995; Blackwell)
- Stereotypes and stereotyping (edited with C.N. Macrae and C. Stangor; Guilford, 1996).
- Miles Hewstone & Wolfgang Stroebe, ed. (2004), Introduction to social psychology: a European perspective (3rd ed.), Massachusetts: Blackwell, ISBN 0-631-20437-7
- Multiple social categorization: Processes, models, and applications (edited with R. Crisp; Psychology Press, 2006)

== Book chapters ==
- Measures of intergroup contact. In Boyle, Gregory J.; Saklofske, Donald H.; Matthews, Gerald (2015). Measures of Personality and Social Psychological Constructs. San Diego: Academic Press. ISBN 9780123869159.
