= Clifford Stott =

British psychologist and academic

Clifford John Thornton Stott MBE (born July 1965) is professor of social psychology at Keele University. He is a specialist in the psychology of crowds, group identity, and football hooliganism.

== Research ==
His initial research interest was in political dissent and this led to research into how peaceful protests change to become violent through observing the psychology of crowds. His work indicated that, rather than riots being driven by hooligans who are predisposed to violence (the 'mindless mob' perspective developed at the end of the nineteenth century), they are structured and led by beliefs. The majority of the crowd consider that they are peaceful protestors with a right to express their views. If disorder or confrontation starts, and the police act against it, the crowd experiences what they consider is illegitimate police use of force. This changes their behaviour so that they resist the police. His research has led to changes in policing by some authorities with the aim of reducing violent confrontations.

He studied the London Poll Tax riots and Italian World cup in 1990, riots in the UK in 2011, and the protests in Hong Kong in 2019, using social media and mapping to follow their trajectory.

Using ideas gained from his research, he advised a region of Portugal on policing football matches. The success of this approach led to its introduction across Portugal, and was subsequently adopted by UEFA across Europe. It has resulted in decreased violence.

He is co-chair of the Security and Policing group and a member of the Scientific Pandemic Influenza Group on Behaviours (SPI-B) advising the Scientific Advisory Group for Emergencies of the UK government in 2020 during the COVID-19 pandemic.

== Education and personal life ==
Stott left school at 16 without qualifications, but after a few years, through part-time study at further education college, he gained qualifications for entry to university. He was able to study psychology at the college, a topic he wanted to study. He studied B. Sc. (HONS) psychology at Plymouth Polytechnic (now University of Plymouth) and then a Ph. D. at Exeter University, supervised by Steve Reicher and funded by the ESRC.

== Honours and awards ==
Stott was the guest on the BBC Radio 4 programme The Life Scientific in June 2020.

He was appointed Member of the Order of the British Empire (MBE) in the 2021 Birthday Honours for services to crowd psychology and the COVID-19 pandemic response.

== Selected publications ==
- Football 'Hooliganism', Policing and the War on the 'English Disease' . Pennant Books, London, 2007. (With Geoff Pearson) ISBN 1906015058
