= Glass cliff =

Workplace phenomenon affecting women in leadership roles

The glass cliff is a phenomenon described by psychologists Michelle K. Ryan and Alexander Haslam, in which women are more likely to break the "glass ceiling" (i.e. achieve leadership roles in business and government) during periods of crisis or downturn when the risk of failure is highest. Other research has expanded the definition of the glass cliff phenomenon to include racial and ethnic minority groups.

== Origins ==
The term was coined in 2005 by British professors Michelle K. Ryan and Alexander Haslam of the University of Exeter, United Kingdom. In a study, Ryan and Haslam examined the performance of FTSE 100 companies before and after the appointment of new board members, and found that companies that appointed women to their boards were likelier than others to have experienced consistently bad performance in the preceding five months. This work eventually developed into the identification of a phenomenon known as the glass cliff – analogous to the concept of a glass ceiling, but implying the inability to perceive the dangers of the cliff's transparent edge rather than the false promise of elevated organizational positions which can be "seen" through a ceiling of glass but which are actually unattainable. Since the term originated, its use has expanded beyond the corporate world to also encompass politics and other domains.

== Overview ==
Ryan and Haslam's research showed that once women break through the glass ceiling and take on positions of leadership, they often have experiences that are different from those of their male counterparts. More specifically, women are more likely to occupy positions that are precarious and thus have a higher risk of failure—either because they are appointed to lead organizations (or organizational units) that are in crisis or because they are not given the resources and support needed for success.

Extending the metaphor of the glass ceiling, Ryan and Haslam evoked the notion of the "glass cliff" to refer to a danger which involves exposure to risk of falling but which is not readily apparent. CEO tenure is typically shorter at companies which are struggling, compared to those which are stable.

Evidence of the glass cliff phenomenon has been documented in the field of law. A 2006 study found law students were much likelier to assign a high-risk case to a female lead counsel rather than a male one. A 2010 study found undergraduate students in British political science likelier to select a male politician to run for a safe seat in a by-election, and much likelier to select a female candidate when the seat was described as hard to get. A 2014 analysis of US Fortune 500 leadership found that firms with weak performance were likely to promote women into CEO positions over white men.

Additional studies have found that women are likely to be primed as candidates in hard-to-win districts. Specifically in the United Kingdom, women of the Conservative Party are more likely selected by party elites to run in less winnable seats than conservative men, though they performed worse than men in elections. This occurs both with experienced and inexperienced women candidates, and those with both conventional and nonconventional political backgrounds, indicating a glass cliff phenomenon as opposed to any other explanation. Though the Conservative Party has begun to incorporate equality guarantee strategies, women candidates are still often specifically posed as candidates in hard to win districts.

In contrast, a 2007 study of corporate performance preceding CEO appointments showed that "corporate performance preceding CEO appointments tends to favor females, implying that females (males) are appointed to the CEO position largely at times when the firm is in relatively better (worse) financial health".

== Explanation ==
Many theories have been advanced to explain the existence of the glass cliff.

University of Houston psychology professor Kristin J. Anderson says companies may offer glass cliff positions to women because they consider women "more expendable and better scapegoats." She says the organizations that offer women tough jobs believe they win either way: if the woman succeeds, the company is better off. If she fails, the company is no worse off, she can be blamed, the company gets credit for having been egalitarian and progressive, and can return to its prior practice of appointing men.

Haslam and Ryan's initial studies indicate that people believe women are better suited to lead stressed, unhappy companies because they are felt to be more nurturing, creative, and intuitive. These researchers argue that female leaders are not necessarily expected to improve the situation, but are seen as good people managers who can take the blame for organizational failure.

Haslam has shown that women executives are likelier than men to accept glass cliff positions because they do not have access to the high-quality information and support that would ordinarily warn executives away. Additional research has indicated that women and other minorities view risky job offers as the only chance they are likely to get.

A 2007 study found that female news consumers in the United Kingdom were likelier than male ones to accept that the glass cliff exists and is dangerous and unfair to women executives. Female study participants attributed the existence of the glass cliff to a lack of other opportunities for women executives, sexism, and men's in-group favoritism. Male study participants said that women are less suited than men to difficult leadership roles or strategic decision-making, or that the glass cliff is unrelated to gender.

Additional research has suggested that women see precarious glass cliff opportunities as the only chances for advancement. While men may view the same opportunities as risky, women candidates might be more willing to accept these positions out of necessity for career advancement purposes. Additionally, women are more likely than men to maintain their positions at any level during times of crisis, making them more readily available for advancement opportunities during times of crisis than male counterparts.

Women with traditionally feminine traits are sought out in times of crisis due to a perceived ability to better handle employee issues. Stereotypically feminine traits, including creativity, helpfulness and awareness of emotion are all associated with better being able to handle failure. Though these traits generally diminish the desirability of women for leadership positions, in times of crisis they are viewed as valuable assets that aid in leadership changes. These skill sets offer opportunities for non-traditional leadership styles, viewed favorably in times of crisis.

Glass cliff situations are likely only to arise under certain conditions, in which women leaders have access to resources they view as favorable to leaders. Research has indicated that in times of crisis, women view leadership positions with a greater amount of social resources more positively than they do positions lacking in social resources. However, they view positions lacking financial resources equally as positively as those with a wide range of social resources.

== Glass cliff for racial and ethnic minority leaders ==
The glass cliff concept has also been used to describe employment discrimination experienced by leaders who are members of minorities or disabled.

Research analyzing the head coaches of NCAA sports teams found that men of racial and ethnic minority groups were promoted to higher leadership positions in times of crisis. Within historically Black colleges and universities, minority leaders were more often appointed than white leaders under all circumstances, but in other universities, minority leaders were appointed to leadership positions primarily in times of crisis. These leaders are also likely to suffer from high visibility, scrutiny and performance pressures that their white counterparts do not receive. The study also found evidence for the savior effect, the idea that organizations will look for "saviors", usually white, when minority leaders are unable to deliver high-quality performance results in times of crisis.

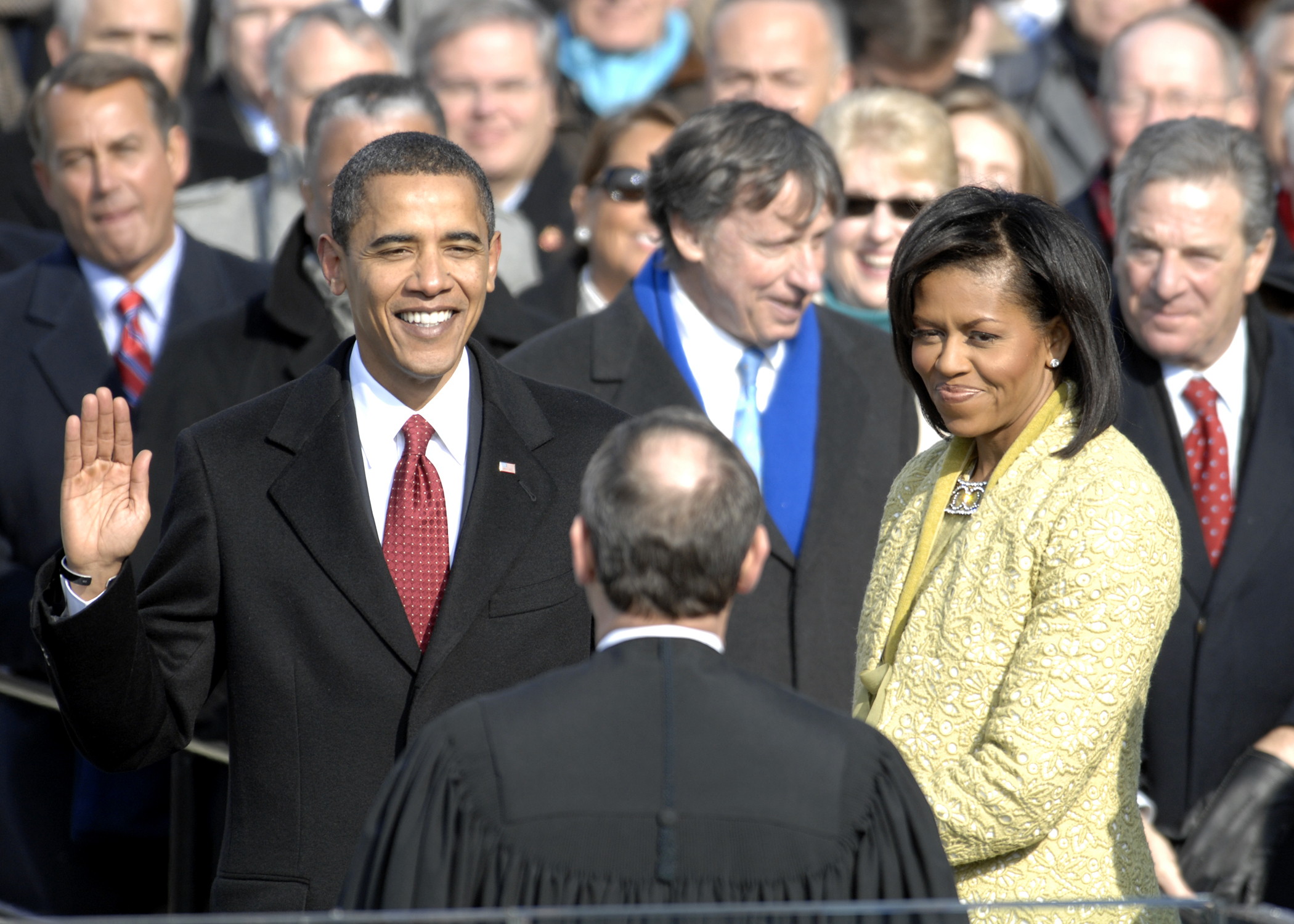
President Barack Obama taking the oath of office in January 2009

Outside of the NCAA, this has occurred in the political sphere. Often times, the 2008 election of Barack Obama, the first African American president of the United States, during the 2008 financial crisis is viewed as evidence of the glass cliff phenomenon for racial and ethnic minority groups.

In British politics, research has indicated that the Conservative Party sent Black and minority ethnic candidates to contest parliamentary seats that are harder to win than other candidates, indicating similar findings other research on the political glass cliff for women candidates. This phenomenon is specific, however, to the Conservative Party, which has traditionally promoted anti-immigration sentiments that may contribute to this. The rise of Rishi Sunak as the United Kingdom's first prime minister of South Asian heritage, following scandals that brought down two prime ministers within a year, was described as an example of the glass cliff effect.

Minority women face a duplicated glass cliff, being affected by both their gender and race. Black women are often given unsustainable amounts of work in higher positions, creating barriers in their careers. It has additionally been argued Black women may be promoted to leadership positions due to outdated stereotypes related to masculine traits Black women are perceived to have. In addition to struggles related to leadership, Black women are also likely to face an added weight of microaggressions and increased questioning of qualifications.

== Implications for women and minority group executives ==
Glass cliff positions risk hurting the women executives' reputations and career prospects because, when a company does poorly, people tend to blame its leadership without taking into account situational or contextual variables. Additionally, women who are appointed to glass cliff positions may be subject to increased criticism from shareholders, who may lack confidence in their leadership. In contrast, men who assume leadership in times of crisis are less likely to experience this backlash, and suffer fewer reputation based consequences. Researchers have found that female leaders find it harder than male ones to get second chances once they have failed due to having fewer mentors and sponsors and less access to a protective "old boys' network".

The glass cliff phenomenon adds to the breadth of work on why women are less likely than men to succeed in leadership positions across a wide range of opportunities, from local school districts to the corporate sphere. As a method of descriptive representation, women who see women leaders disposed of as a result of glass cliff leadership may be less likely to see themselves in positions of power, and be less likely to express interest in career advancement.

However, some researchers argue that companies in bad situations offer more opportunities for power and influence compared with companies that are stable.

A study examining glass cliff effects on women leaders in Turkey, a country which has high levels of femininity, found that the preference for female candidates was higher in times of good performance than in times of poor performance. Additional research has affirmed this finding in other countries.

== Examples ==
News media have described the following as examples of the glass cliff.

=== Political examples ===
- In 1990, two female premiers were appointed in Australia: Joan Kirner inherited a significant deficit in Victoria, while Carmen Lawrence headed the Western Australian Labor Party, which had previously been accused of corruption. In 2009, Kristina Keneally was appointed Premier of New South Wales amid low polling for her party and their eventual defeat in 2011. Julia Gillard was appointed as Australia's first female prime minister and subsequently ousted amid procedural complaints about the leadership spill.
- In 1993, the Canadian Progressive Conservative Party, facing low approval ratings and almost assured loss in the upcoming general elections, elected Kim Campbell, then Defense Minister, to replace Brian Mulroney as its leader and prime minister of Canada. The election dealt the Progressive Conservatives the most devastating defeat in Canadian history, reducing them from 156 seats to 2.
- In 2009, Indonesian Finance Minister Sri Mulyani was accused of misappropriating the country's funds to conduct an alleged unauthorized bailout for Bank Century a year prior which was failing at the time. She contested that the Rp. 6.7 trillion ($710 million) bailout was necessary, in order to prevent the country's economy from crashing and received a warning of the bank's impending failure from the central bank. She decided to resign as finance minister in 2010 after 5 years and 7 months in office during Susilo Bambang Yudhoyono's presidency, keeping the country's economy stable during the 2008 financial crisis.
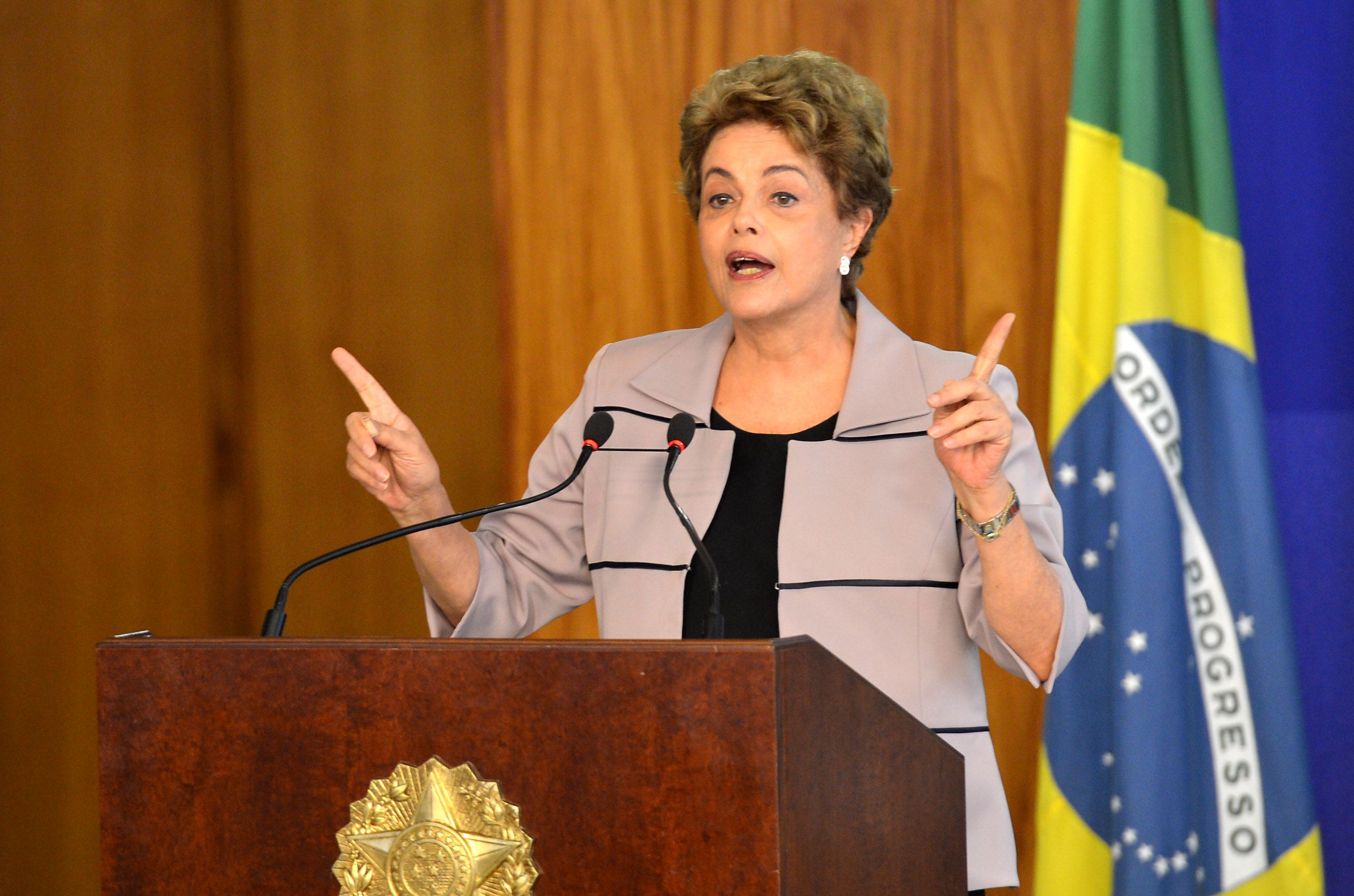
  Dilma Rousseff during her 2016 impeachment trial
- In 2010, Dilma Rousseff was appointed candidate for president of Brazil by the ruling Workers' Party when they were being investigated by the Federal Police for allegations of corruption schemes. She won the presidential election and was reelected for a second term in 2014. She was then impeached in 2016.
- In 2016, Theresa May became leader of the Conservative Party and Prime Minister of the United Kingdom shortly after a referendum result to leave the EU caused the pound to drop in value to levels not seen in 30+ years.
- In 2017, Jacinda Ardern was elected as leader of the New Zealand Labour Party, eight weeks before the general election.
- In 2020, Agnès Buzyn replaced Benjamin Griveaux as the LREM candidate for Mayor of Paris, after Griveaux's alleged sexts with a woman were leaked.
- In 2020, Judith Collins was elected leader of the New Zealand National Party.
- In 2020, Chrystia Freeland was appointed as Canada's first female federal finance minister during the economic crisis caused by the COVID-19 pandemic. Her appointment to minister of finance was a direct result of former minister Bill Morneau's WE Charity Scandal.
- In 2021, U.S. Vice President Kamala Harris was tapped to lead the response to challenges at the southern border, which has historically been a significant and polarized issue in American politics.
- In 2022, Liz Truss became leader of the Conservative Party and Prime Minister of the United Kingdom following Boris Johnson's resignation after a government crisis, and amid a surge in global inflation and the domestic cost of living. She resigned on her fiftieth day in office, following a second government crisis.
- In 2024, U.S. Vice President Kamala Harris was nominated as the Democratic party candidate in the 2024 presidential election following President Joe Biden's withdrawal from the race.
- In 2025, Sussan Ley was elected as the first female leader of the Liberal Party of Australia after the Liberal Party received its worst seat share ever at the 2025 Australian federal election. She was subsequently ousted from the position after just 9 months in the role and resigned from parliament altogether soon afterwards.
- In 2025, the Liberal Democratic Party of Japan, whose popular support had been declining for years, and after a string of short-lived governments, chose Sanae Takaichi as its new party president. She secured a coalition agreement with the Japan Innovation Party and was chosen by the National Diet on October 21 as the first female Prime Minister of Japan.
- In 2026, Christine Fréchette was elected as leader of the Coalition Avenir Québec (CAQ), following François Legault's resignation amid poor polling and numerous scandals during his Premiership. The CAQ would end up losing every seat it held in the 2026 Quebec general election, and Fréchette subsequently stepped down as leader shortly after the election.

=== Corporate and business examples ===
- In 2002, then-unprofitable telecommunications company Lucent Technologies appointed Patricia Russo CEO, and then replaced her with Ben Verwaayen.
- In 2008, during the 2008–2011 Icelandic financial crisis, various women were appointed to repair the industry with the rationale that broader perspectives would prevent the same mistakes from occurring.
- In 2011, "a horrible time for newspapers", Jill Abramson was appointed editor of The New York Times, and in 2014 she was fired.
- In 2012, Marissa Mayer was appointed as the CEO of Yahoo after it lost significant market share to Google.
- In 2015, Ellen Pao resigned amidst controversy after several months as CEO of Reddit. Much of the furore was directed at the firing of popular Reddit employee Victoria Taylor, though former Reddit CEO Yishan Wong revealed that this was the decision of cofounder Alexis Ohanian, not Pao.
- In 2021, Alexis George was appointed as the CEO of the troubled Australian financial services company AMP Limited.
- In 2021, Jen Oneal was appointed the first female lead of Blizzard Entertainment after the California Department of Fair Employment and Housing v. Activision Blizzard lawsuit which alleged the company had a culture of sexual misconduct.
  Following Activision Blizzard's acquisition by Microsoft in 2023, Johanna Faries, the general manager of the Call of Duty series, was named Blizzard Entertainment's new president effective on February 5, 2024. Faries' appointment was a significant change for Blizzard Entertainment, whose leaders have in the past come up through the ranks of gaming and tech.
- In 2023, Linda Yaccarino was appointed as the CEO of Twitter while the company was facing an uncertain future and a number of challenges, including outages, user discontent and advertiser skepticism. The company lost more than half of its value since its acquisition by Elon Musk six months prior. Yaccarino announced her resignation from the position in July 2025 amid Twitter's acquisition by Musk's artificial intelligence company xAI, as well as backlash against xAI's chatbot Grok pushing antisemitic tropes and praise of Adolf Hitler.
- In 2026, Colette Kress was appointed interim CEO of NVIDIA after Jensen Huang resigned in light of two affairs, one with an alleged Chinese spy and another with an executive who reported to him.

== See also ==
- Bamboo ceiling
- Glass escalator
- List of female top executives
- National Association for Female Executives
