= Paul van Lange =

Dutch psychologist

- Citizenship: Amsterdam
- Education: University of Groningen
- Known for: Research on cooperation and trust
- Awards: Van der Aa Oevre award (Career award) for his contributions to the behavioral sciences from the Koninklijke Hollandsche Maatschappij voor Wetenschappen (Royal Dutch Society for Sciences) (2024) Lifetime Achievement Award from the European Association of Social Psychology (2023) Ig Nobel award (2022), category Peace Ammodo Science Award Royal Dutch Academy of Sciences team award 2020 Kurt Lewin Award (mid career, 2014), European Association of Social Psychology
- Scientific career
- Fields: Social psychology
- Institutions: Vrije Universiteit Amsterdam
- Website: www.paulvanlange.com

Paul A.M. van Lange is a Dutch professor of psychology at the Vrije Universiteit Amsterdam, distinguished scholar at the University of Oxford, and holds a global professorship at the University of Cologne.

In his work on trust and human cooperation, he adopts psychological, economic, and ecological approaches to the brighter and darker sides of humankind. In so doing, he studies empathy, altruism, and fairness, as well as competition, norm violations, and hate, as well as broad societal issues such as climate change, refugee crisis, or intergroup conflict (e.g., in soccer). He served as supervisor for more than 40 PhD students and Post-Docs, who completed research on topics such as cooperation in social dilemmas, gossip, bystander-effect, social mindfulness, and social relations (Vitamin S).

He has (co)authored around 250 articles in journals such as Behavioral and Brain Sciences, PNAS, Nature Human Behavior, Psychological Bulletin, and Perspectives on Psychological Science, and received various awards such as the Ig Nobel award, Ammodo Science Prize (for teams) by the Royal Dutch Academy of Arts and Sciences, the Kurt Lewin Award (mid-career), Lifetime Achievement Award by the European Association of Social Psychology, and a Lifetime Achievement Award (Van der Aa) for his contributions to behavioral science by the Dutch Royal Society of Science.

He has also (co)edited or authored 13 books on a variety of topics, including social dilemmas, how to publish, cheating and corruption, and power and politics, including Handbook of theories of social psychology (2012) and Handbook of social psychology: Basic principles (see "official website"). He is involved in many outreach activities, including contributions to (inter)national media, advice to national campaigns (SIRE, #DOESLIEF), and providing annual workshops for mayors and other professionals in the Netherlands and Europe. He has previously served as president of the Society of Experimental Social Psychology and scientific director of the Kurt Lewin Institute, is the founding editor of Current Opinion in Psychology and Current Research in Ecological and Social Psychology, and served as associate editor for, among others, Journal of Personality and Social Psychology and Psychological Science.
