= British Journal of Social and Clinical Psychology =

Academic journal

- Discipline: Psychology
- Language: English

Publication details
- History: 1962–1980
- Publisher: British Psychological Society (United Kingdom)
- Frequency: Quarterly

Standard abbreviations
- ISO 4: Br. J. Soc. Clin. Psychol.

Indexing
- ISSN: 0007-1293
- LCCN: 65008688
- OCLC no.: 01537312
- Online archive

The British Journal of Social and Clinical Psychology was a peer-reviewed academic journal published by the British Psychological Society. It was established in 1962 and was split in two publications in 1981:

- British Journal of Social Psychology
- British Journal of Clinical Psychology

== Abstracting and indexing ==
The journal was abstracted and indexed by the Index Medicus/MEDLINE/Pubmed, the Modern Language Association Database, and Scopus.
