= Nicholas Mackintosh =

British experimental psychologist (1935–2015)

Nicholas Mackintosh FRS
- Born: Nicholas John Seymour Mackintosh; 9 July 1935; London, England
- Died: 8 February 2015 (aged 79); Bury St Edmunds, England
- Education: Winchester College
- Alma mater: University of Oxford (BA, DPhil)
- Scientific career
- Fields: Psychology
- Workplaces: University of Cambridge
- Thesis: Discrimination learning in animals (1963)
- Doctoral advisor: Stuart Sutherland

Nicholas John Seymour Mackintosh, FRS (9 July 1935 – 8 February 2015) was a British experimental psychologist and author, specialising in intelligence, psychometrics and animal learning.

== Education ==
Mackintosh was born in London, the son of Ian Mackintosh and his wife Daphne Cochrane. He was educated at Winchester College and the University of Oxford where he was a student of Magdalen College, Oxford and obtained a Bachelor of Arts degree in 1960, followed by a Doctor of Philosophy degree in 1963 supervised by Stuart Sutherland.

== Career and research ==
From 1964 until 1967, he was a lecturer at the University of Oxford. From 1967 until 1973 he held a Killiam Professorship at Dalhousie University in Halifax, Canada. From 1973 to 1981, he taught at the University of Sussex, prior to being appointed Head of the Department of Experimental Psychology in the University of Cambridge in 1981 until his retirement in 2002.

He was a Fellow of King's College, Cambridge.

=== Awards and honours ===
The British Psychological Society awarded him the Biological Medal in 1984 and the President's Award in 1986. In 1987 he was elected a Fellow of the Royal Society. He was, until his death, Emeritus Professor of Experimental Psychology as well as Distinguished Associate in the Psychometrics Centre in the University of Cambridge. He died in Bury St Edmunds at the age of 79 on 8 February 2015 after a short illness.

=== Selected books ===
- Mackintosh, N. J. (1974), Psychology of Animal Learning, Academic Press, ISBN 0124646506
- —— (1983), Conditioning and Associative Learning, Clarendon Press, ISBN 0198521014
- —— (1995), Cyril Burt: fraud or framed?, Oxford University Press, ISBN 019852336X
- —— (1998), IQ and Human Intelligence, Oxford University Press, ISBN 019852367X
- —— (2011). IQ and Human Intelligence (second ed.). Oxford: Oxford University Press. ISBN 978-0-19-958559-5.
