= Kevin J. Connolly =

British psychologist (1937–2015)

Kevin Joseph Connolly
- Born: 1937
- Died: 2015 (aged 77–78)
- Scientific career
- Fields: Psychology, developmental psychology
- Workplaces: University of Sheffield

Kevin Joseph Connolly (29 July 1937 – 11 December 2015) was a British psychologist who specialised in the field of developmental psychology and fly behaviour genetics.

== Life ==
After he completed his PhD, Connolly started his career as a lecturer at Birkbeck College. He then moved to the University of Sheffield becoming Head of the Department of Psychology and Dean of the Faculty of Pure Science.

He was active in the British Psychological Society and was elected President of the Society in 1978. In his presidential address he emphasised the need for researchers and practitioners in psychology to work more closely together to combat important social issues such as poverty

== Work ==
His expertise was in the contrasting areas of developmental psychology and fly behaviour genetics. His work on child development was concerned with motor control in children (Connolly, 1989). He edited an important textbook with Jaan Valsiner (Valsiner & Connolly, 2005) In fly genetics he was interested in how certain genes could be linked to specific behaviours (Connolly, 1966).

== Awards ==
- 1970 - Spearman Medal, British Psychological Society
- 1977-1978 - President, British Psychological Society

== Publications ==
- Valsiner, J., & Connolly, K.J. (eds) (2005). Handbook of Developmental Psychology. London: Sage.
- Connolly, K.J. (1989). The emergence of a tool-using skill in infancy. Developmental Psychology, 25(6),894–912.
- Connolly, K.J. (1966). Locomotor Activity in Drosophila as a Function of Food Deprivation. Nature, 209, 224.
