= Essi Viding =

Professor of Developmental Psychopathology

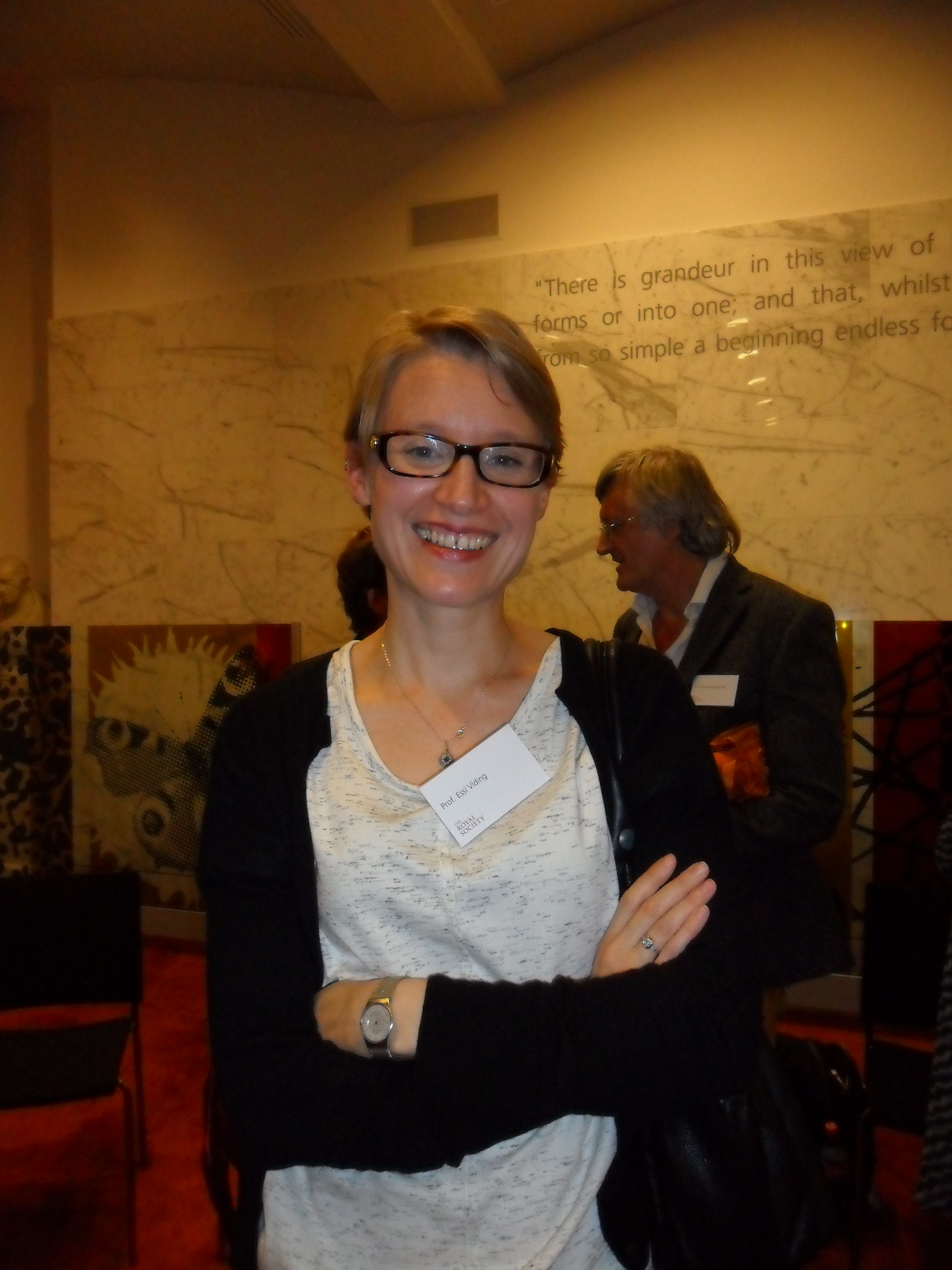
- Viding in 2012
- Born: Essi Maria Viding; Finland
- Education: University College London; King's College London (PhD)
- Awards: Wiley Prize in Psychology (2010); Spearman Medal (2011); Rosalind Franklin Award (2017)
- Scientific career
- Fields: Psychopathy; Conduct problems; Neuroimaging; Emotion
- Workplaces: University College London
- Thesis: Investigating neurocognitive systems underlying impulsivity in attention deficit hyperactivity disorder and conduct disorder (2004)
- Doctoral advisor: Francesca Happé
- Website: iris.ucl.ac.uk/iris/browse/profile?upi=EVIDI50

Essi Maria Viding is Professor of Developmental Psychopathology at University College London in the Faculty of Brain Sciences, where she co-directs the Developmental Risk and Resilience Unit, and an associate of King's College London's Institute of Psychiatry, Psychology and Neuroscience. Viding's research focuses on development of disruptive behaviour disorders, as well as children and young people's mental health problems more broadly. She uses cognitive experimental measures, brain imaging and genetically informative study designs in her work.

== Education ==
Viding was educated at King's College London where she was awarded a PhD in 2004 for research supervised by Francesca Happé. She did her postdoctoral research under the supervision of Robert Plomin.

== Awards and honours ==
Viding was the 2011 winner of the British Psychological Society's Spearman Medal, and received the 2017 Rosalind Franklin Award. She was elected Fellow of the British Academy in 2020 and Fellow of the Academy of Medical Sciences in 2021.

== Publications ==
- Psychopathy: A Very Short Introduction, 2019
