= Charles Hulme =

British psychologist

Charles Hulme FBA FAcSS
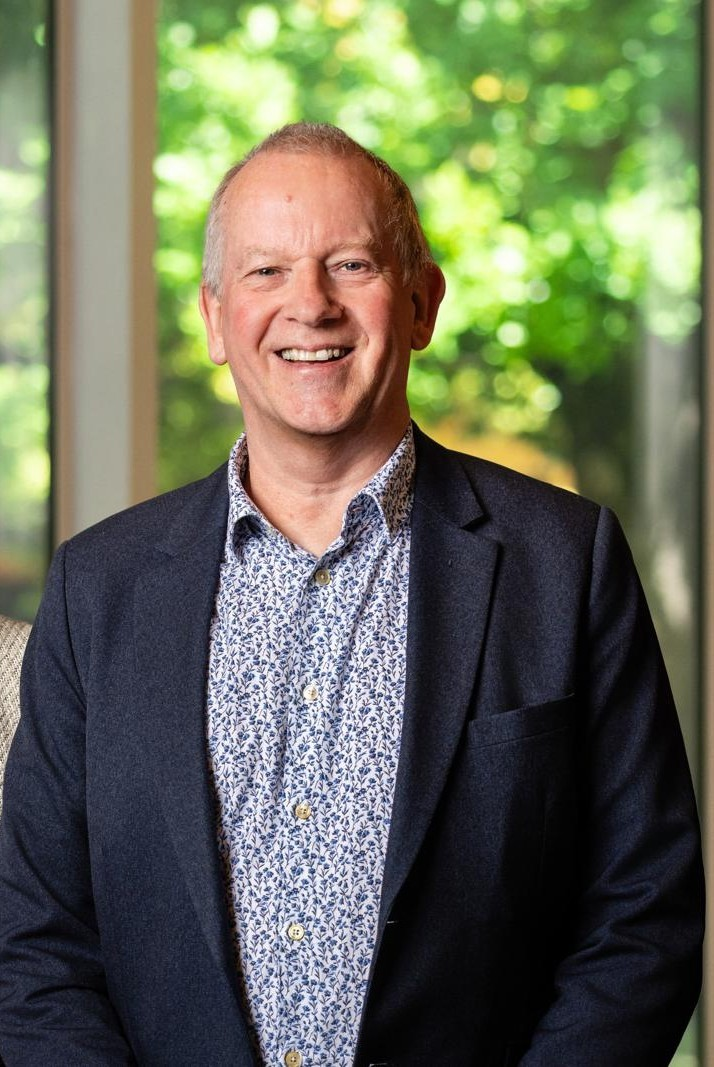
- Born: 12 October 1953 (age 73)
- Education: University of Oxford (MA, DPhil)
- Spouse: Maggie Snowling
- Scientific career
- Fields: Educational psychology
- Workplaces: University of York; University College London; University of Oxford

Charles Hulme FBA, FAcSS is a British psychologist and academic specialising in reading and oral language development, memory processes, and developmental disorders of learning. He is Emeritus Professor of Psychology and Education at the University of Oxford and Professor of Psychology at Oxford Brookes University. He is co-founder and Chief Executive Officer (CEO) of OxEd Ltd, a University of Oxford spin-out company that translates educational research into practical assessments, interventions, and teaching programs.

Hulme's research helped in understanding how oral language skills underpin learning to read and to the cognitive bases of developmental learning disorders including dyslexia and developmental language disorder. The Nuffield Early Language Intervention (NELI), developed with Maggie Snowling, has been delivered in approximately two-thirds of English primary schools since 2020, with continued support from the UK’s Department for Education.

Hulme is ranked in the top 1% of all researchers in the field of Psychology by citations. He was elected a Fellow of the British Academy in 2017.

== Early life and education ==
Hulme grew up in Wilmslow, Cheshire and attended state schools there. He was awarded an Open Scholarship in Natural Sciences to Oriel College, University of Oxford, where he read Experimental Psychology, graduating with a First Class Honours degree in 1976. He remained at Oxford for doctoral study in the Department of Experimental Psychology, supervised by Donald Broadbent and Peter Bryant, holding a Graduate Scholarship at Wolfson College. He was awarded his DPhil in March 1979 for a thesis entitled Reading Retardation and a Method of Remedial Teaching.

== Career ==
Hulme began his academic career as a Lecturer in Psychology at the University of York in 1978, where he was subsequently promoted to Reader (1988) and then Professor of Psychology (1992). He served as Head of the Department of Psychology at York from 1997 to 2001.

In 2011 he moved to University College London as Professor of Psychology. From 2017 to September 2022 he held the position of Professor of Psychology and Education at the University of Oxford, where he is now Emeritus Professor. Since 2022 he has held a part-time position as Professor of Psychology at Oxford Brookes University.

== Research ==
Hulme's research spans reading and language development and disorders, memory processes, and the development of arithmetic skills. A central theme is the use of rigorous experimental and longitudinal research methods, including randomised controlled trials and meta-analytic reviews, to establish the cognitive foundations of literacy and to translate basic science into evidence-based educational interventions.

=== Reading development and phonological skills ===
Hulme's research demonstrated that children with dyslexia often experience verbal memory difficulties and provided early experimental support for multisensory teaching methods. His later work established phoneme awareness and letter-sound knowledge as key predictors of reading development, demonstrating their causal role in learning to read and showing that reading acquisition further strengthens children's phonological skills.

=== Memory and short-term memory ===
Hulme's work on memory provided evidence that long-term memory representations contribute substantially to short-term memory performance; a finding with implications for theories of working memory. This work was developed in collaboration with Gordon D.A. Brown into influential computational and mathematical models of serial order memory.

=== Intervention research ===
A hallmark of Hulme's body of work is the development and RCT-based evaluation of interventions for children with reading and oral language difficulties.

His collaboration with Peter Hatcher produced an influential study demonstrating that combining phonological awareness training with reading instruction, the phonological linkage approach, significantly ameliorated early reading failure more effectively than either approach alone. This line of work was developed into the Sound Linkage programme, now in its third edition.

=== The Nuffield Early Language Intervention (NELI) ===
The Nuffield Early Language Intervention (NELI) is a structured oral language intervention developed by Hulme, Maggie Snowling, and colleagues for children in their first year of formal schooling who show oral language weaknesses. It is the best-evidenced early language intervention available globally having been evaluated in a series of randomised controlled trials and independent evaluations funded by the Education Endowment Foundation. Following positive trial results, in 2020 NELI was rolled out nationally across England with support from the Department for Education.

=== Dyslexia and developmental language disorder ===
Hulme's longitudinal work with Snowling and colleagues traced the developmental pathways from preschool language profiles to later reading outcomes, and a meta-analytic review with Melby-Lervåg established that phonological skills play a central role in reading acquisition across languages.

With Snowling, Hulme proposed the Reading Is Language (RIL) Model, a theoretical framework situating reading acquisition within the broader context of oral language development and providing a basis for understanding both typical and atypical reading development.

== Awards and honours ==
- 1985 Spearman Medal, awarded by the British Psychological Society for published psychological work of outstanding merit.
- 1998 Feitelson Research Award (with P. Hatcher and A. Ellis), awarded by the International Reading Association.
- 2014 Honorary Doctor of Philosophy (honoris causa), University of Oslo.
- 2015 Elected member of Academia Europaea.
- 2016 Inducted into the Reading Hall of Fame by the International Literacy Association.
- 2016 Marion Welchman Award for Contributions to the Study of Dyslexia, awarded by the British Dyslexia Association.
- 2016 Elected Fellow of the Royal Society of Arts (FRSA).
- 2016 Elected Fellow of the Academy of Social Sciences (FAcSS).
- 2016 Elected Fellow of the Association for Psychological Science.
- 2017 Elected Fellow of the British Academy (FBA).
- 2019 Distinguished Scientific Contributions Award, awarded by the Society for the Scientific Study of Reading.
- 2024 Leverhulme Medal and Prize, awarded by the British Academy.
- 2025 Samuel Torrey Orton Award, awarded by the International Dyslexia Association.

== Personal life ==
In 1995 he married fellow academic Margaret Snowling.

== Publications ==
- Snowling, Margaret J.; Hulme, Charles (2025). "The Reading Is Language (RIL) Model: A Theoretical Framework for Language and Reading Development and Intervention". Annual Review of Developmental Psychology. 7: 195–218. doi:10.1146/annurev-devpsych-111323-084821.
- Snowling, Margaret J.; Hulme, Charles; Nation, Kate, eds. (2022). The Science of Reading: A Handbook (2nd ed.). Wiley-Blackwell. doi:10.1002/9781119705116.
- Melby-Lervåg, Monica; Hulme, Charles (2013). "Is Working Memory Training Effective? A Meta-Analytic Review". Developmental Psychology. 49 (2): 270–291. doi:10.1037/a0028228.
- Melby-Lervåg, Monica; Lyster, Solveig-Alma Halaas; Hulme, Charles (2012). "Phonological Skills and Their Role in Learning to Read: A Meta-Analytic Review". Psychological Bulletin. 138 (2): 322–352. doi:10.1037/a0026744.
- Hulme, Charles; Snowling, Margaret J. (2009). Developmental Disorders of Language Learning and Cognition. Wiley-Blackwell.
- Snowling, Margaret J.; Hulme, Charles, eds. (2005). The Science of Reading: A Handbook. Blackwell Publishing.
- Hatcher, Peter J.; Hulme, Charles; Ellis, Andrew W. (1994). "Ameliorating Early Reading Failure by Integrating the Teaching of Reading and Phonological Skills: The Phonological Linkage Hypothesis". Child Development. 65 (1): 41–57. doi:10.1111/j.1467-8624.1994.tb00733.x.
- Hulme, Charles; Maughan, Sarah; Brown, Gordon D. A. (1991). "Memory for Familiar and Unfamiliar Words: Evidence for a Long-Term Memory Contribution to Short-Term Memory Span". Journal of Memory and Language. 30 (6): 685–701. doi:10.1016/0749-596X(91)90032-F.
- Hulme, Charles (1981). Reading Retardation and Multi-Sensory Teaching. London: Routledge & Kegan Paul.
