= Stuart Sutherland =

British psychologist (1927–1998)

- Born: Norman Stuart Sutherland; 26 March 1927
- Died: 8 November 1998 (aged 71)
- Education: King Edward's School, Birmingham
- Alma mater: University of Oxford (BA, DPhil)
- Spouse: Jose Louise Fogden (married 1956)
- Children: 2
- Scientific career
- Workplaces: University of Sussex
- Thesis: Visual shape discrimination in animals with special reference to actapus vulgaris lamarck (1957)
- Academic advisors: John Zachary Young
- Doctoral students: Nicholas Mackintosh

(Norman) Stuart Sutherland (26 March 1927 – 8 November 1998) was a British psychologist and writer.

== Education ==
Sutherland was educated at King Edward's School, Birmingham, before going to Magdalen College, Oxford, where he read psychology, Philosophy and Physiology. He stayed at University of Oxford for his PhD which was awarded in 1957 for research supervised by John Zachary Young.

== Career and research ==
Sutherland held a lecturing post at Oxford from 1960, and was elected a Fellow of Merton College, Oxford in March 1963, before moving the following year to the recently opened University of Sussex as the founding Professor and head of its Laboratory of Experimental Psychology; with the young colleagues he appointed, he rapidly built an international reputation for Sussex in this field.

Among psychologists, Sutherland is best known for his theoretical and empirical work in comparative psychology, particularly in relation to visual pattern recognition and discrimination learning. In the 1950s and 1960s he carried out numerous experiments on rats but also on other species such as octopus; the two-factor theory of discrimination learning that he developed with Nicholas Mackintosh was an important step in the rehabilitation of a cognitive approach to animal learning after the dominance of strict behaviourism in the first half of the twentieth century. He was also interested in human perception and cognition, and in 1992 he published Irrationality: The enemy within, a lay reader's guide to the psychology of cognitive biases and common failures of human judgement.

Among a wider public, Sutherland is most famous for his 1976 autobiography Breakdown, detailing his struggles with manic depression. A second edition of Breakdown was published in 1995. Stuart Sutherland died from a heart attack in November 1998.

=== Bibliography ===
(incomplete; excludes journal articles, of which Sutherland published many)

- The methods and findings of experiments on the visual discrimination of shape by animals, 1961
- Animal discrimination learning, 1969 (Edited, with R. M. Gilbert)
- Mechanisms of animal discrimination learning, 1971 (with Nicholas Mackintosh)
- Breakdown, 1976, second edition published 1995 ISBN 0-19-852380-7, reissued by Pinter & Martin 2010, ISBN 978-1-905177-20-2
- Prestel and the user: a survey of psychological and ergonomic research, 1980.
- The psychology of vision, 1980 (Edited, with Christopher Longuet-Higgins)
- Discovering the human mind, 1983.
- Men change too, 1987
- Macmillan Dictionary of Psychology. 1990. Also published as The International Dictionary of Psychology. 2nd ed. New York: Crossroad, 1995. ISBN 0-8245-2509-4.
- Irrationality
