= Leverhulme Medal (British Academy) =

The Leverhulme Medal and Prize is awarded by the British Academy every three years 'for a significant contribution to knowledge and understanding in a field within the humanities and social sciences'. It was first awarded in 2002 and is funded by the Leverhulme Trust.

== List of recipients ==
Year	Name	Field	Notes
2002	Sir Ernst Gombrich and Sir Raymond Firth	Art History (Gombrich), Anthropology and Ethnology (Firth)	
2005	Sir Tony Wrigley	Geography	
2009	Sebastian Brock	Aramaic language	
2012	Dame Marilyn Strathern	Anthropology	
2015	Sir Richard J. Evans	Modern German History	
2018	Professor David W. Harvey, FBA	"For demonstrating the importance of the social sciences in understanding the modern complexities of capitalism, urbanism and questions of social justice."	
2021	Professor Catherine Hall, FBA	"In recognition of Professor Hall’s impact across modern and contemporary British history, particularly in the fields of class, gender, empire and postcolonial history"	
2024	Charles Hulme and Maggie Snowling	"for their complementary contributions to understanding childhood learning development, particularly dyslexia and developmental language disorders"	

== See also ==
- Awards of the British Academy
- List of social sciences awards
