= Maggie Snowling =

British psychologist (born 1955)

Margaret Snowling CBE FBA FMedSci
- Born: 15 July 1955 (age 71)

Academic background
- Education: University of Bristol, University College London

Academic work
- Discipline: Psychology

Margaret Jean Snowling CBE FBA FMedSci is a British psychologist and expert in language difficulties, including dyslexia. From 2012 to 2022 she was President of St John's College, Oxford and Professor in the Department of Experimental Psychology, University of Oxford. Snowling was appointed Commander of the Order of the British Empire (CBE) in 2016 for services to science and the understanding of dyslexia. She is a Fellow of the British Academy (elected 2009), Fellow of the Academy of Medical Sciences (elected 2008), Fellow of the Academy of Social Sciences, and Honorary Fellow of the British Psychological Society.

== Education ==
Snowling studied psychology at the University of Bristol, entering the university in 1973 and graduating with a BSc in Psychology in 1976. She undertook doctoral research at University College London under the supervision of psychologist Uta Frith, receiving a PhD in 1979. She later qualified as a clinical psychologist in 1988.

== Career ==
Snowling was Lecturer, Senior Lecturer and Head of Department at National Hospitals College of Speech Sciences (1979–1992), Professor of Psychology and Head of Department at Newcastle University (1992–1994), and Professor of Psychology at the University of York (1994–2012).

She has been awarded honorary doctorates by Goldsmiths, University of London (2007), University College London (2014), the University of Warwick (2016), and the University of Bristol (2019).

She served as President of St John's College, Oxford from 2012 to 2022.

== Research interests ==
Snowling's main research interests are in the development of language and literacy skills. In particular, her research looks at underlying causes of difficulties in language and literacy skills, and what interventions are effective in treating them. A central focus of her research is dyslexia, and the effect of oral language difficulties on educational attainment. Her research established a cognitive-developmental account of dyslexia, characterising it as primarily a deficit in phonological processing that disrupts the acquisition of correspondences between graphemes and phonemes.

Her work with Dorothy Bishop demonstrated that dyslexia and Specific Language Impairment (SLI), now Developmental Language Disorder (DLD) are related disorders sharing a common deficit in phonological processing, while differing in the breadth of language impairment. Her longitudinal studies have mapped the developmental outcomes of children with each disorder and those with comorbid presentations.

In addition, Snowling's research has considered the prominent role of women and mothers – in academia, advocacy movements and teaching – in provision for children with dyslexia and other special educational needs. Principally, this has been through her work on the history of dyslexia.

The Nuffield Early Language Intervention (NELI) is a structured oral language intervention developed by Snowling, Charles Hulme, and colleagues for children in their first year of formal schooling who show oral language weaknesses. It is the best-evidenced early language intervention available globally having been evaluated in a series of randomised controlled trials and independent evaluations funded by the Education Endowment Foundation. Following positive trial results, in 2020 NELI was rolled out nationally across England with support from the Department for Education.

== Awards ==
Snowling's contributions to the study of dyslexia have been recognised with the Marion Welchman Award of the British Dyslexia Association in 1997, the British Psychological Society Presidents' Award in 2003, the Samuel T. Orton award of the International Dyslexia Association in 2005, and the Lady Radnor Prize of Dyslexia Action in 2013.

She is a fellow of the British Psychological Society (1992), Royal Society of Arts (2002), Academy of Medical Sciences (2008), and British Academy (2009). She was elected Academician of the Academy of Social Sciences in 2003. Together with Charles Hulme, she received the 2024 Leverhulme Medal and Prize. She is a member of Academia Europaea and of the Reading Hall of Fame.

== Personal life ==
Snowling is married to fellow psychologist Charles Hulme.

== Selected published works ==
- Dyslexia: A Very Short Introduction (2019). Oxford University Press
- Developing Reading Comprehension (2013) (with PJ Clarke, E Truelove, C Hulme). Wiley-Blackwell
- Developing Language and Literacy: Effective Intervention for Language and Literacy in the Early Years (2011) (with JM Carroll, C Bowyer-Crane, F Duff, C Hulme). Wiley-Blackwell
- Developmental Disorders of Language, Learning and Cognition (with C Hulme). Wiley-Blackwell
- Dyslexia (2nd edition) (2000). Blackwell
- Dyslexia: A Cognitive-Developmental Perspective (1st edition) (1997). Blackwell

Academic offices
Preceded by Michael Scholar	President of St John's College, Oxford; 2012–2022	Succeeded by Sue Black
