= European Association of Social Psychology =

Organization

The European Association of Social Psychology (EASP), formerly the European Association of Experimental Social Psychology (EAESP) is a scientific professional organization of social psychologists. EASP currently has over 1200 members worldwide and aims to promote excellence in European research in the field of social psychology. For this purpose, it organizes a variety of research activities and is responsible for a range of journals that report significant research contributions. Through these activities it encourages scientific communication among European social psychologists and connects European scholars to the community of social psychologists in the world at large.

== History ==
The organization was founded in 1966 with the goal of advancing social psychology in Europe.

== Meetings ==
EASP organizes a range of meetings to promote and disseminate research and scholarship:

- General Meeting. This is held every three years and lasts four days. It is the major opportunity for members to come together to present and discuss their research.
- Summer School. This is held every two years, and lasts two weeks. This is an opportunity for young scholars to work intensively with senior researchers in a collaborative learning environment.
- Small group and medium size meetings. Up to 6 Small Group Meetings and 2 Medium Size Meetings are held each year. These are an opportunity for scholars (at least 50% of whom must be EASP members) to come together to present research and advance scholarship in a defined area of research.

== Journals ==
The association is responsible for the following journals*

- European Journal of Social Psychology. This is published bimonthly by Wiley-Blackwell.
- European Review of Social Psychology. This is published once a year, by Psychology Press.
- Social Psychological and Personality Science. This is published bimonthly by SAGE Publications and was co-founded by EASP (together with SPSP, SESP, and ARP).
- European Bulletin of Social Psychology. This is the official newsletter of the association.
- European Monographs in Social Psychology. These are published on an ad hoc basis to present advanced research on a given topic.

== Awards ==
The association recognizes excellence in Social Psychology through the following awards*

- Henri Tajfel Medal. This recognizes lifetime contribution to European Social Psychology
- Kurt Lewin Medal. This is a mid-career award for research excellence
- Jos Jaspars Medal. This is an early career award for research excellence
- Jean-Paul Codol Medal. This recognizes outstanding service to European Social Psychology
- EJSP early-career best manuscript Award. This is for the best EJSP paper published by a researcher within 3 years of receiving their PhD.

== Governance ==
EASP is managed by a seven-person executive committee. Members serve a six-year term and three or four new members are elected at every General Meeting. Key office holders are the President, Treasurer, and Secretary.
