= European Journal of Social Psychology =

- Discipline: Social psychology
- Language: English

Publication details
- History: 1971–present
- Publisher: John Wiley & Sons (United Kingdom)
- Impact factor: 2.22

Standard abbreviations
- ISO 4: Eur. J. Soc. Psychol.

Indexing
- CODEN: EJSPA6
- ISSN: 0046-2772 (print); 1099-0992 (web)
- LCCN: 76155371
- OCLC no.: 889405502

Links
- Journal homepage; Online archive

The European Journal of Social Psychology is a peer-reviewed academic journal covering research in social psychology, including social cognition, attitudes, group processes, social influence, intergroup relations, self and identity, nonverbal communication, and social psychological aspects of affect and emotion, and of language and discourse. According to the Journal Citation Reports, its 5-year impact factor is 2.22 and the journal is currently ranked 21/60 in social psychology.

== History ==
The journal was established in 1971 and published by Mouton Publishers. Publication was then taken over by John Wiley & Sons in July 1977. It has been sponsored by the European Association of Social Psychology since its very beginning.
