= British Journal of Social Psychology =

- Discipline: Social psychology
- Language: English
- Edited by: Stephen Gibson, Laura Smith

Publication details
- Former names: British Journal of Social and Clinical Psychology
- History: 1962-present
- Publisher: Wiley-Blackwell on behalf of the British Psychological Society (United Kingdom)
- Frequency: Quarterly
- Impact factor: 6.920 (2021)

Standard abbreviations
- ISO 4: Br. J. Soc. Psychol.

Indexing
- CODEN: BJSPDA
- ISSN: 0144-6665 (print); 2044-8309 (web)
- LCCN: 81642357
- OCLC no.: 475047529

Links
- Journal homepage; Current issue; Online archive

The British Journal of Social Psychology is a peer-reviewed academic journal published by Wiley-Blackwell on behalf of the British Psychological Society. It publishes original papers on subjects like social cognition, attitudes, group processes, social influence, intergroup relations, self and identity, nonverbal communication, and social psychological aspects of affect and emotion, and of language and discourse. The journal was established in 1962 as the British Journal of Social and Clinical Psychology and obtained its current title in 1981. According to the Journal Citation Reports, the journal has a 2021 impact factor of 6.920.
