= Defensive help =

Type of helping behaviour

Defensive helping is a concept in social psychology that describes where a member of an ingroup proffers help to an outgroup member in order to reduce the threat the outgroup poses to the ingroup.

This concept stems from research exploring social identity threats (a part of social identity theory) and motivations for helping behaviour. Defensive helping is concerned specifically with the relative status threat. This is where the perceived advantage of the ingroup over the outgroup is threatened by the outgroup. By providing defensive help to the outgroup, the ingroup is able to restore its positive distinctiveness which reduces or removes the relative status threat. Positive self-regard is the original proposed motivation for defence help although research has also explored the biological basis of this behaviour. Researchers have also investigated defensive help as a social dominance method.

Defensive help is a unique form of helping behaviour. Most notably, defensive help is preemptively offered without consideration of needs for the receiver of help and the type of help offered is dependency-oriented, reinforcing the receiver's need for external solutions to problems. The concept has implications in political psychology regarding views on immigration, intergroup conflicts and the promotion of equality between groups.

== Theoretical background ==
Psychology researchers Arie Nadler, Gal Harqz-Gorodeisky and Yael Ben-David were the first to propose defensive helping in 2009. Their proposal was informed by social identity theory, especially through the concept of social identity threats, and research exploring positive-self regard as a motivation for helping behaviour.

=== Social identity theory ===
Social identity theory was proposed and developed by psychologists Henri Tajfel and John Turner. Their theory argues that people make relative social comparisons between ingroups that one is a part of and outgroups one is not a part of. People spend a large amount of time doing this in order to obtain a positive social identity. Social identity theory suggests that it can be used to explain intergroup behaviour. Specifically, that it can predict certain intergroup behaviours based on perceived status differences, perceived legitimacy and stability of those status differences, and perceived ability of one to move from one group to another.

==== Social identity threats ====
Social identity threats are a component of social identity theory that concern how threats to a group's social identity are experienced as personal threats to members of that group. There are several ways in which social identity threats threats can form. For example, the motivational hypothesis of group distinctiveness suggests that for members of a group there is an innate need for group distinctiveness, that information that the group is indistinct poses a threat to the group and this threat evokes a response that aims to restore distinctiveness of the group.

Defensive helping is concerned specifically with the relative status threat. In social psychology status can be defined either as a structural situational condition. Structural status is defined by institutional social inequalities between groups in a society. An example would be, racial inequality between those of African and European heritages. On the other hand, situational status is defined by contextual differences between groups. For example, swimming ability of children in different groups at a summer camp. Structural status can also inform situational status. For example, structural gender inequality may mean boys are expected to swim faster than girls in a given situation.

Relative status threat is created when an outgroup threatens a perceived advantage of ingroup having greater competence, knowledge or resources. Or in other words, a status threat is created when a high-status group perceives a threat of the closing of a hierarchical gap. This can occur when a disadvantaged outgroup threatens to achieve equal status with the ingroup or when an equal outgroup threatens to exceed the status of the ingroup.

=== Motivations for defensive helping ===
According to social identity theory the ingroup is motivated to compete with an outgroup by striving for positive distinctiveness. In the case of defensive helping, it is assumed that helping an outgroup member "averts imminent threats to an ingroup's relative abilities, resources or existing privileges, thereby securing the ingroup's positive distinctiveness from the outgroup". This means that by offering help to the outgroup, this restores the relative and distinct status advantage of the ingroup over the outgroup. This in turn reduces the threat to the ingroup by the outgroup.

This assumption is made on psychological research into helping behaviour showing that increases to self-esteem, status, prestige act as key motivators in helping others. Volunteers regard increased positive self-regard as a major reason for devoting themselves to helping others and volunteering behaviour is sustained by people feeling good about themselves. An experiment has shown that helping others can repair an injured self-esteem caused by a previous mistake. Another study found that gains to status and influence is both a motivation for and increased by helping others. Researchers have explained this by the evolutionary psychology handicap principle, which argues that being altruistic and helping others builds a positive status as someone who can afford forgoing resources for the benefit of others.

== Empirical research findings ==
=== Original proposal ===
Arie Nadler, Gal Harqz-Gorodeisky and Yael Ben-David were able to demonstrate defensive helping as a unique form of helping behavior through a series of three empirical studies. They suggest it is unique in three ways:

- The target of help must threaten the ingroup social identity through their standing or achievements.
- Help is offered regardless of whether the receiver requests or requires help. This means that help could be offered preemptively on the assumption that receiver in the outgroup is incompetent or inadequate.
- Defensive help is dependency-oriented help. This means a full solution to a problem is provided, therefore reinforcing the receiver's dependence on external sources of assistance. The opposite would be autonomy-oriented help, which seeks to empower independent problem solving by providing a partial solution.

In their research, 'Study 1' found that defensive help occurred most often when individuals identified strongly with the ingroup and when the outgroup posed a threat to social identity. 'Study 2' elaborated on this finding, showing that the greatest amount of defensive help was given when the person receiving help was the source of the social identity threat. Finally, 'Study 3' showed that when participants were primed with the uniqueness of their group, they offered greater amounts of dependency-oriented help compared to autonomy-oriented help.

Psychology researchers Leeuwen and Täuber suggest that threats to the ingroup can take three forms: power and autonomy, meaning and existence, and impression formation. They interpret the proposal for defensive helping as being related to power given defensive helping concerns the ingroup's status and ability to assert social dominance over others.

=== Social dominance ===
Kang elaborates defensive helping in terms of social dominance, describing the concept a socially motivated dominance strategy. In this sense, benevolent sexism, the white saviour complex and voluntourism can be examples of defensive help. Background research on white privilege showed that that members of a high status group are motivated to protect against threats to the group's image and dominant status. Equally, a study on sexism has shown that exposure to benevolently sexist views successfully predicts men offering dependency-oriented help and women seeking dependency-oriented help more often.

Kang's research aimed to predict the type of threats under which defensive helping is used compared to other social dominance strategies such as willful ignorance, competitive victimhood and blatant hostility. His participants were American and either male or white. The results showed that defensive help is most likely to occur when 'maintenance' is high and 'innocence' is low. These refer to, maintenance motivation which are threats to social dominance and innocence motivation which refers to threats to the legitimacy of the group. Results also showed that, while relatively less likely, defensive help is also likely to occur when maintenance is low and innocence is high.

=== Biopsychology ===
Research by Viera et al. explores the biopsychology behind defensive helping. In an empirical research study they asked participants to make decisions about whether to help a co-participant to avoid an electric shock at the risk of receiving a shock themselves. They found that when the threat was imminent, as opposed to distal, defensive helping increased. This occurred independently of likelihood for the helper to receive a shock for helping. In the imminent condition participants experienced greater physiological changes with a faster heart rate and quicker reaction times.

A 3D model of the brain highlighting the Insula.

In later research, Viera and Olsson elaborate specifically on the neuropsychology behind defensive helping. Using fMRI methods they identified that the brain regions that coordinate 'quick escape from self-directed danger' predicted defensive helping. The regions include the insula, PAG, and ACC. The researchers were also able to show that it was the strength of threat presentation to oneself by the brain that predicted defensive helping rather than seeing the distress of others. This finding was seen as important because defensive helping has often been overlooked in helping behaviour compared to explanations such as empathy.

== Implications in politics ==
=== Views on immigration ===
A study done in Canada found that typically, when asked to consider needs of new immigrant groups, empowerment is suggested. This was, however, not the case when perceptions of economic competition were presented to participants through experimental manipulation or inference from social hierarchy. In this scenario, participants were less willing to offer empowerment. Nadler interpreted this as defensive helping whereby being made aware of economic competition, a perceived status threat is created. This determined that dependence-oriented help was offered instead of autonomy-oriented help.

=== Greek–Turkish earthquake diplomacy ===
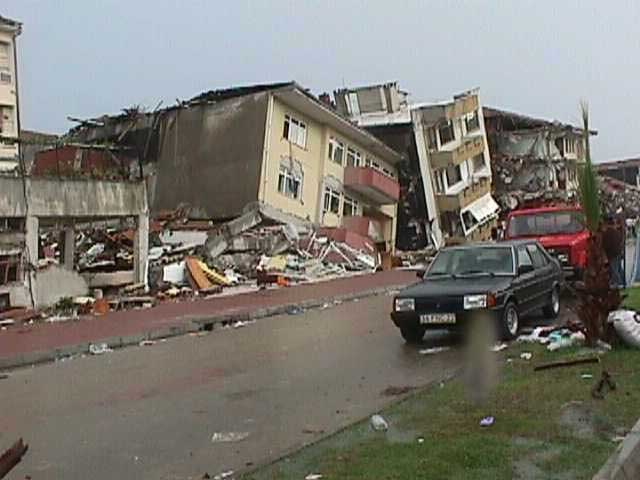
Collapsed buildings in İzmit following the 1999 earthquake.

Greece–Turkey relations are known for being adversarial. An exception to this occurred following the 1999 İzmit earthquake which has come to be known as Greek–Turkish earthquake diplomacy. From the perspective of defensive help, offers of humanitarian aid by the Greek government would typically be rejected by the Turkish government due to the associated implications of relative inferiority. This was, however, not the case in 1999 where instead the provision of aid was accepted and resulted in a thawing of tensions between the two nations.

Nadler et al. suggested that when a high-status ingroup shares a common identity with an outgroup this can enable defensive helping to empower equality between two groups. In this scenario, a major life-threatening humanitarian disaster enabled a common identity of "being human" to form between the two groups. This allowed the groups to move beyond competition and status instead moving to genuine care for the welfare of others, enabling further equality between the groups. In this sense, the status threat is not eliminated but instead no longer perceived as a threat in of itself.

=== Israeli–Palestinian conflict ===
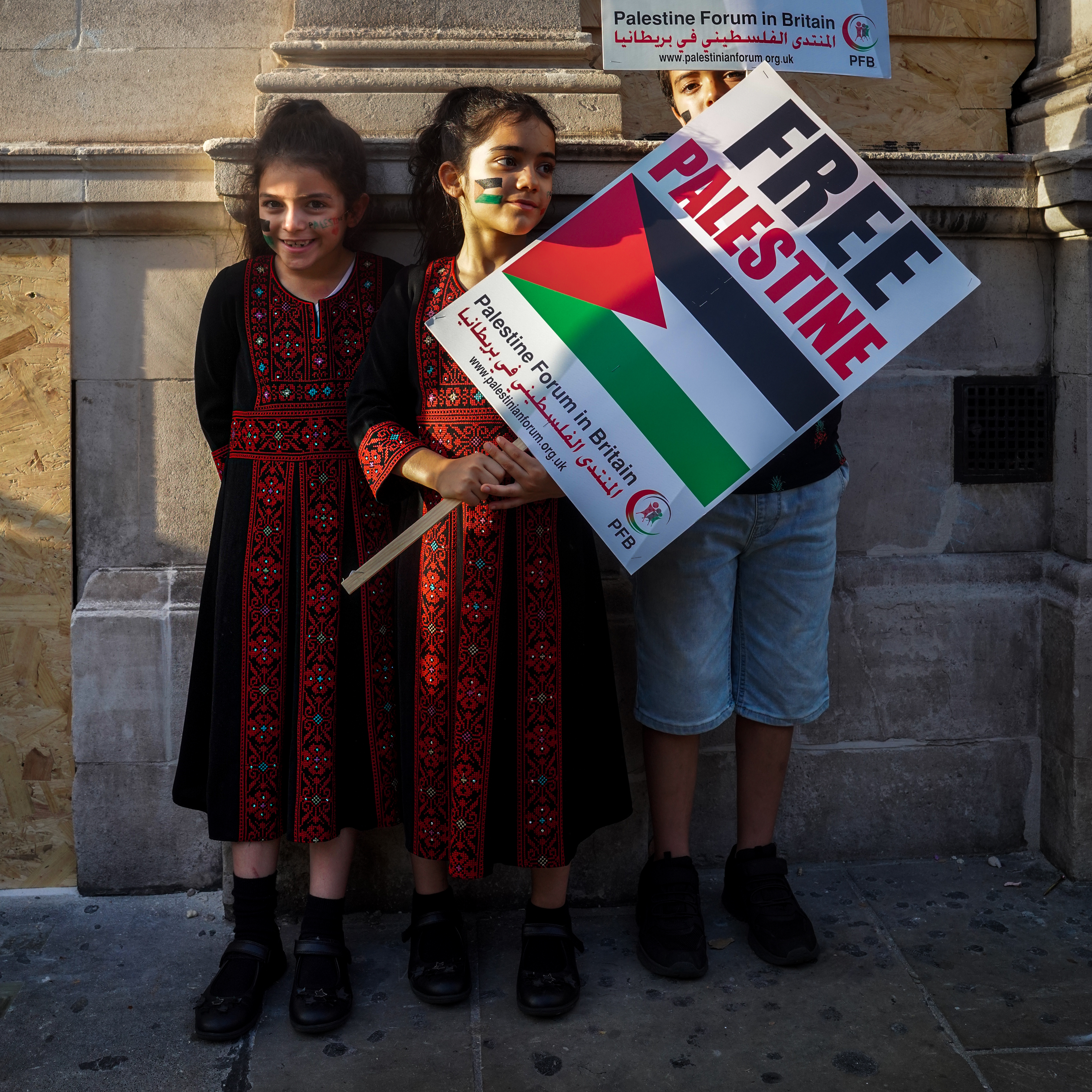
Palestinian children in their traditional dress.

Research has explored the Israeli–Palestinian conflict as a way of separating adversary advantaged (Israeli) and disadvantaged (Palestinian) groups. Nadler et al. suggested that the cooperation projects between Israel and Palestine have different implications for the two groups. For Israelis, the sharing of knowledge and resources is an act of goodwill and generosity. While for Palestinians, it is a humiliating reminder of the disadvantages the group faces. In this scenario, defensive helping does not increase equality because the ulterior motive is known and so intergroup tensions are increased instead.

Hirschberger et al. has also conducted research in this area. They carried out a series of five studies concluding that when death is made salient, ingroup members (Israelis) are more willing to help an outgroup member (Palestinians) in order to enhance the high status moral image of the ingroup. They also found that in order to protect the group's moral image, people refrain from helping an outgroup member who is affected by the ingroup's own actions. This was shown by greater willingness to help, through signing a petition for or donating blood to, a Palestinian child who is a victims of Palestinian gunfire compared to a Palestinian child who is a victim of Israeli gunfire.
