= Ethnocentrism =

Judging another culture by the values and standards of one's own culture

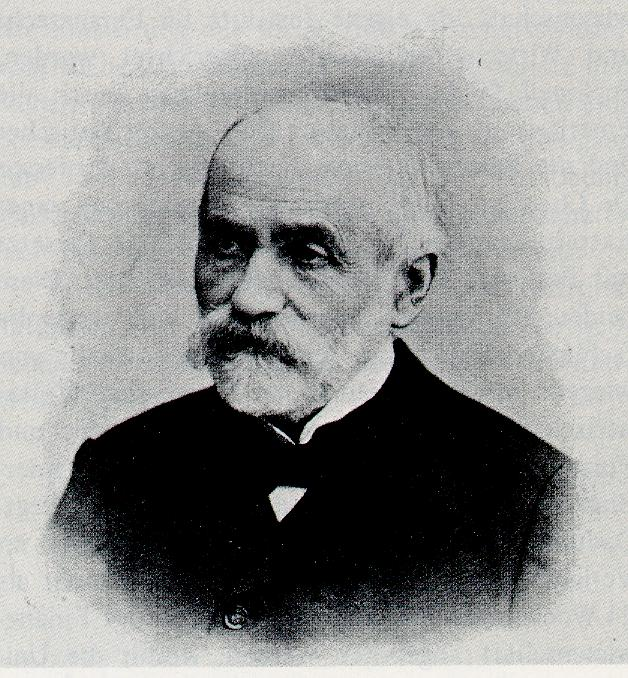
Polish sociologist Ludwig Gumplowicz is believed to have coined the term "ethnocentrism" in the 19th century, although he may have merely popularized it.

Ethnocentrism in social science and anthropology—as well as in colloquial English discourse—is the application of one's own culture or ethnicity as a frame of reference to judge other cultures, practices, behaviors, beliefs, and people, instead of using the standards of the particular culture involved. Since this judgment is often negative, some people also use the term to refer to the belief that one's culture is superior to, or more correct or normal than, all others—especially regarding the distinctions that define each ethnicity's cultural identity, such as language, behavior, customs, and religion. In common usage, it can also simply mean any culturally biased judgment. For example, ethnocentrism can be seen in the common portrayals of the Global South and the Global North.

Ethnocentrism is sometimes related to racism, stereotyping, discrimination, or xenophobia. However, the term ethnocentrism does not necessarily involve a negative view of the others' race or indicate a negative connotation. The opposite of ethnocentrism is cultural relativism, a guiding philosophy stating that the best way to understand a different culture is through their perspective rather than judging them from the subjective viewpoints shaped by one's own cultural standards.

The term ethnocentrism was first applied in the social sciences by American sociologist William G. Sumner. In his 1906 book, Folkways, Sumner describes ethnocentrism as "the technical name for the view of things in which one's own group is the center of everything, and all others are scaled and rated with reference to it." He further characterized ethnocentrism as often leading to pride, vanity, the belief in one's own group's superiority, and contempt for outsiders.

Over time, ethnocentrism developed alongside the progression of social understandings by people such as social theorist Theodor W. Adorno. In Adorno's The Authoritarian Personality, he and his colleagues of the Frankfurt School established a broader definition of the term as a result of "in group-out group differentiation", stating that ethnocentrism "combines a positive attitude toward one's own ethnic/cultural group (the in-group) with a negative attitude toward the other ethnic/cultural group (the out-group)." Both of these juxtaposing attitudes are also a result of a process known as social identification and social counter-identification.

== Origins and development ==
The term ethnocentrism derives from two Greek words: ethnos, meaning 'nation', and kentron, meaning 'center'. Scholars believe this term was coined by Polish sociologist Ludwig Gumplowicz in the 19th century, although alternate theories suggest that he only popularized the concept as opposed to inventing it. He saw ethnocentrism as a phenomenon similar to the delusions of geocentrism and anthropocentrism, defining Ethnocentrism as "the reasons by virtue of which each group of people believed it had always occupied the highest point, not only among contemporaneous peoples and nations, but also in relation to all peoples of the historical past."

Subsequently, in the 20th century, American social scientist William G. Sumner proposed two different definitions in his 1906 book Folkways. Sumner stated that "Ethnocentrism is the technical name for this view of things in which one's own group is the center of everything, and all others are scaled and rated with reference to it." In the War and Other Essays (1911), he wrote that "the sentiment of cohesion, internal comradeship, and devotion to the in-group, which carries with it a sense of superiority to any out-group and readiness to defend the interests of the in-group against the out-group, is technically known as ethnocentrism." According to Boris Bizumic, it is a popular misunderstanding that Sumner originated the term ethnocentrism, stating that in actuality, he brought ethnocentrism into the mainstreams of anthropology, social science, and psychology through his English publications.

Several theories have been reinforced through the social and psychological understandings of ethnocentrism including Adorno's Authoritarian Personality Theory (1950), Donald T. Campbell's Realistic Group Conflict Theory (1972), and Henri Tajfel's Social identity theory (1986). These theories have helped to distinguish ethnocentrism as a means to better understand the behaviors caused by in-group and out-group differentiation throughout history and society.

== Ethnocentrism in social sciences ==
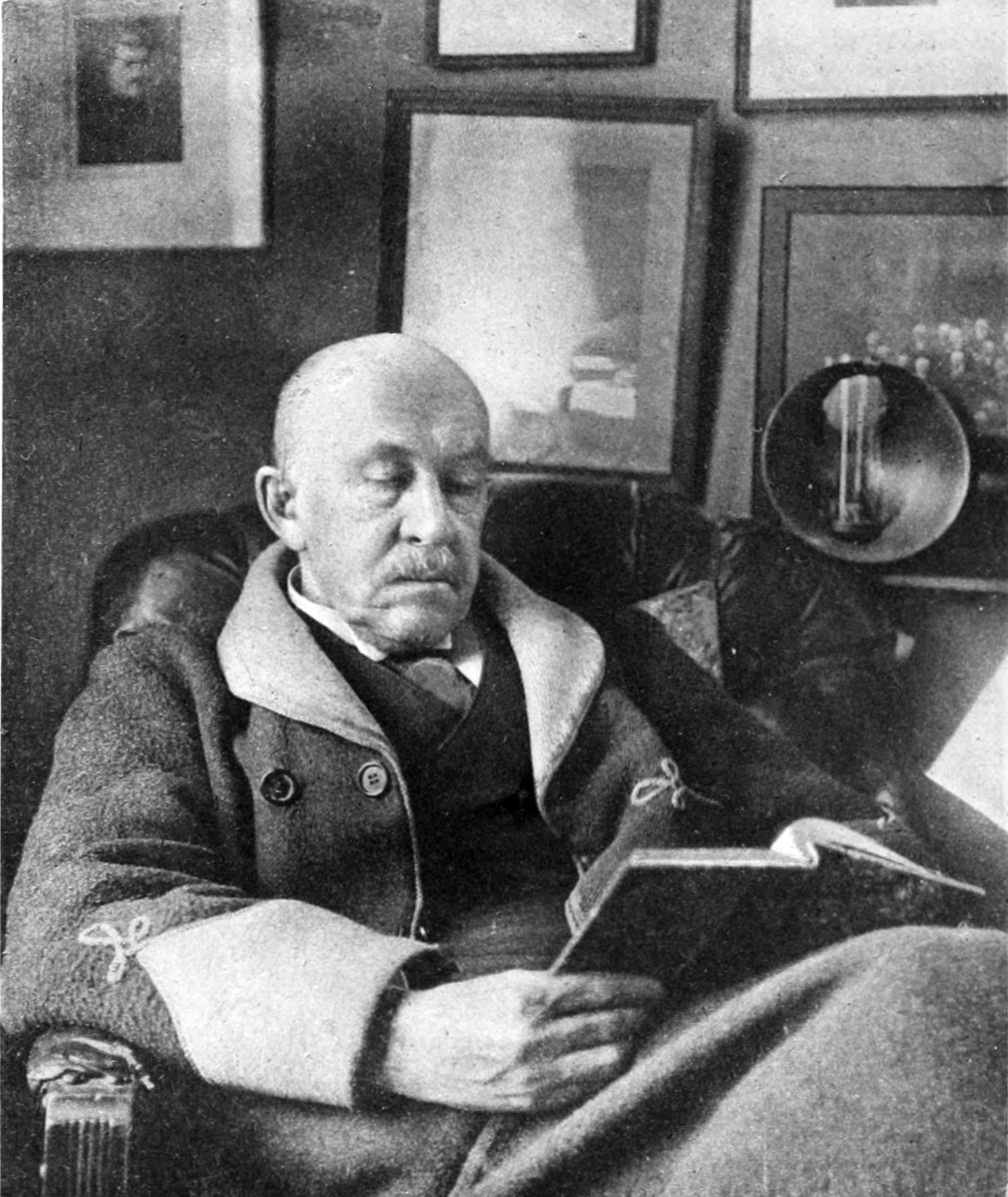
William Graham Sumner

In social sciences, ethnocentrism means to judge another culture based on the standard of one's own culture instead of the standard of the other particular culture. When people use their own culture as a parameter to measure other cultures, they often tend to think that their culture is superior and see other cultures as inferior and bizarre. Ethnocentrism can be explained at different levels of analysis. For example, at an intergroup level, this term is seen as a consequence of a conflict between groups; while at the individual level, in-group cohesion and out-group hostility can explain personality traits. Also, ethnocentrism can help us to explain the construction of identity. Ethnocentrism can explain the basis of one's identity by excluding the outgroup that is the target of ethnocentric sentiments and used as a way of distinguishing oneself from other groups that can be more or less tolerant. This practice in social interactions creates social boundaries, such boundaries define and draw symbolic boundaries of the group that one wants to be associated with or belong to. In this way, ethnocentrism is a term not only limited to anthropology but also can be applied to other fields of social sciences like sociology or psychology. Ethnocentrism may be particularly enhanced in the presence of interethnic competition, hostility and violence. On the other hand, ethnocentrism may negatively influence expatriate worker's performance.

== Anthropology ==
The classifications of ethnocentrism originate from the studies of anthropology. With its omnipresence throughout history, ethnocentrism has always been a factor in how different cultures and groups related to one another. Examples including how historically, foreigners would be characterized as "Barbarians". These trends exist in complex societies, e.g., "the Jews consider themselves to be the 'chosen people', and the Greeks defend all foreigners as 'barbarians'", and how China believed their country to be "the centre of the world". However, the anthropocentric interpretations initially took place most notably in the 19th century when anthropologists began to describe and rank various cultures according to the degree to which they had developed significant milestones, such as monotheistic religions, technological advancements, and other historical progressions.

Most rankings were strongly influenced by colonization and the belief to improve societies they colonized, ranking the cultures based on the progression of their western societies and what they classified as milestones. Comparisons were mostly based on what the colonists believed as superior and what their western societies have accomplished. Victorian era politician and historian Thomas Macaulay once claimed that "one shelf of a Western library" had more knowledge than the centuries of text and literature written by Asian cultures. Ideas developed by Western scientists such as Herbert Spencer, including the concept of the "survival of the fittest", contained ethnocentric ideals; influencing the belief that societies which were 'superior' were most likely to survive and prosper. Edward Said's concept of Orientalism represented how Western reactions to non-Western societies were based on an "unequal power relationship" that the Western world developed due to its history of colonialism and the influence it held over non-Western societies.

The ethnocentric classification of "primitive" were also used by 19th and 20th century anthropologists and represented how unawareness in cultural and religious understanding changed overall reactions to non-Western societies. 19th-century anthropologist Edward Burnett Tylor wrote about "primitive" societies in Primitive Culture (1871), creating a "civilization" scale where it was implied that ethnic cultures preceded civilized societies. The use of "savage" as a classification is modernly known as "tribal" or "pre-literate" where it was usually referred as a derogatory term as the "civilization" scale became more common. Examples that demonstrate a lack of understanding include when European travelers judged different languages based on the fact that they could not understand it and displayed a negative reaction, or the intolerance displayed by Westerners when exposed to unknown religions and symbolisms. Georg Wilhelm Friedrich Hegel, a German philosopher, justified Western imperialism by reasoning that since the non-Western societies were "primitive" and "uncivilized", their culture and history was not worth conserving and thus should welcome Westernization.

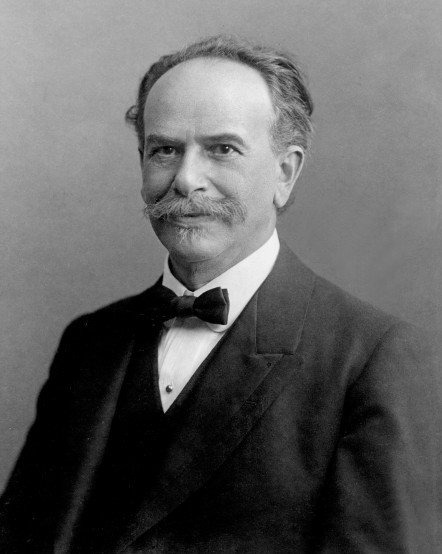
Franz Boas

Anthropologist Franz Boas saw the flaws in this formulaic approach to ranking and interpreting cultural development and committed himself to overthrowing this inaccurate reasoning due to many factors involving their individual characteristics. With his methodological innovations, Boas sought to show the error of the proposition that race determined cultural capacity. In his 1911 book The Mind of Primitive Man, Boas wrote that:

It is somewhat difficult for us to recognize that the value which we attribute to our own civilization is due to the fact that we participate in this civilization, and that it has been controlling all our actions from the time of our birth; but it is certainly conceivable that there may be other civilizations, based perhaps on different traditions and on a different equilibrium of emotion and reason, which are of no less value than ours, although it may be impossible for us to appreciate their values without having grown up under their influence.

Together, Boas and his colleagues propagated the certainty that there are no inferior races or cultures. This egalitarian approach introduced the concept of cultural relativism to anthropology, a methodological principle for investigating and comparing societies in as unprejudiced a way as possible and without using a developmental scale as anthropologists at the time were implementing. Boas and anthropologist Bronisław Malinowski argued that any human science had to transcend the ethnocentric views that could blind any scientist's ultimate conclusions.

Both had also urged anthropologists to conduct ethnographic fieldwork to overcome their ethnocentrism. To help, Malinowski would develop the theory of functionalism as guides for producing non-ethnocentric studies of different cultures. Classic examples of anti-ethnocentric anthropology include Margaret Mead's Coming of Age in Samoa (1928), which in time has met with severe criticism for its incorrect data and generalisations, Malinowski's The Sexual Life of Savages in North-Western Melanesia (1929), and Ruth Benedict's Patterns of Culture (1934). Mead and Benedict were two of Boas's students.

Scholars generally agree that Boas developed his ideas under the influence of the German philosopher Immanuel Kant. Legend has it that, on a field trip to the Baffin Islands in 1883, Boas would pass the frigid nights reading Kant's Critique of Pure Reason. In that work, Kant argued that human understanding could not be described according to the laws that applied to the operations of nature, and that its operations were therefore free, not determined, and that ideas regulated human action, sometimes independent of material interests. Following Kant, Boas pointed out the starving Eskimos who, because of their religious beliefs, would not hunt seals to feed themselves, thus showing that no pragmatic or material calculus determined their values.

== Causes ==
Ethnocentrism is believed to be a learned behavior embedded into a variety of beliefs and values of an individual or group.

Due to enculturation, individuals in in-groups have a deeper sense of loyalty and are more likely to follow the norms and develop relationships with associated members. Within relation to enculturation, ethnocentrism is said to be a transgenerational problem since stereotypes and similar perspectives can be enforced and encouraged as time progresses. Although loyalty can increase better in-grouper approval, limited interactions with other cultures can prevent individuals to have an understanding and appreciation towards cultural differences resulting in greater ethnocentrism.

The social identity approach suggests that ethnocentric beliefs are caused by a strong identification with one's own culture that directly creates a positive view of that culture. It is theorized by Henri Tajfel and John C. Turner that to maintain that positive view, people make social comparisons that cast competing cultural groups in an unfavorable light.

Alternative or opposite perspectives could cause individuals to develop naïve realism and be subject to limitations in understandings. These characteristics can also lead to individuals to become subject to ethnocentrism, when referencing out-groups, and black sheep effect, where personal perspectives contradict those from fellow in-groupers.

Realistic conflict theory assumes that ethnocentrism happens due to "real or perceived conflict" between groups. This also happens when a dominant group may perceive the new members as a threat. Scholars have recently demonstrated that individuals are more likely to develop in-group identification and out-group negatively in response to intergroup competition, conflict, or threat.

Although the causes of ethnocentric beliefs and actions can have varying roots of context and reason, the effects of ethnocentrism has had both negative and positive effects throughout history. The most detrimental effects of ethnocentrism resulting into genocide, apartheid, slavery, and many violent conflicts. Historical examples of these negative effects of ethnocentrism are The Holocaust, the Crusades, the Trail of Tears, and the internment of Japanese Americans. These events were a result of cultural differences reinforced inhumanely by a majority group who thought of themselves as superior. In his 1976 book on evolution, The Selfish Gene, evolutionary biologist Richard Dawkins writes that "blood-feuds and inter-clan warfare are easily interpretative in terms of Hamilton's genetic theory." Simulation-based experiments in evolutionary game theory have attempted to provide an explanation for the selection of ethnocentric-strategy phenotypes.

The positive examples of ethnocentrism throughout history have aimed to prohibit the callousness of ethnocentrism and reverse the perspectives of living in a single culture. These organizations can include the formation of the United Nations; aimed to maintain international relations, and the Olympic Games; a celebration of sports and friendly competition between cultures.

== Effects ==
A study in New Zealand was used to compare how individuals associate with in-groups and out-groupers and has a connotation to discrimination. Strong in-group favoritism benefits the dominant groups and is different from out-group hostility and/or punishment. A suggested solution is to limit the perceived threat from the out-group that also decreases the likeliness for those supporting the in-groups to negatively react.

Ethnocentrism also influences consumer preference over which goods they purchase. A study that used several in-group and out-group orientations have shown a correlation between national identity, consumer cosmopolitanism, consumer ethnocentrism, and the methods consumers choose their products, whether imported or domestic. Countries with high levels of nationalism and isolationism are more likely to demonstrate consumer ethnocentrism, and have a significant preference for domestically-produced goods.

== Ethnocentrism and racism ==
Ethnocentrism is usually associated with racism. However, as mentioned before, ethnocentrism does not necessarily implicate a negative connotation. In European research, the term racism is not linked to ethnocentrism because Europeans avoid applying the concept of race to humans; meanwhile, using this term is not a problem for American researchers. Since ethnocentrism implicated a strong identification with one's in-group, it mostly automatically leads to negative feelings and stereotyping to the members of the outgroup, which can be confused with racism. Finally, scholars agree that avoiding stereotypes is an indispensable prerequisite to overcome ethnocentrism; and mass media play a key role regarding this issue. The differences that each culture possess causes could hinder one another leading to ethnocentrism and racism. A Canadian study established the differences among French Canadian and English Canadian respondents based on products that would be purchased due to ethnocentrism and racism. Due to how diverse the world has become, society has begun to misinterpret the term cultural diversity, by using ethnocentrism to create controversy among all cultures.

== Effects of ethnocentrism in the media ==
=== Film ===
As the United States leads the film industry in worldwide revenue, ethnocentric views can be transmitted through character tropes and underlying themes. The 2003 film "The Last Samurai," was analyzed to have strong ethnocentric themes, such as in-group preference and the tendency to show judgement towards those in the out-group. Similarly, the film received criticism for historical inaccuracies and perpetuating a "white savior narrative," showing a tendency for ethnocentrism centered around the United States.

=== Social media ===
Approximately 67.1% of the global population use the internet regularly, with 63.7% of the population being social media users. In a 2023 study, researchers found that social media can enable its users to become more tolerant of other people, bridging the gap between cultures, and contributing to global knowledge. In a similar study done regarding social media use by Kenyan teens, researchers found that when social media is limited to a certain group, it can increase ethnocentric views and ideologies.

== See also ==
- Afrocentrism
- American exceptionalism
- Americentrism
- Asiacentrism
- Chosen people
- Collective narcissism
- Consumer ethnocentrism
- Ethnic nationalism
- Eurocentrism
- Hellenocentrism
- Indocentrism
- Mediterraneanism
- Mortality salience
- Nativism (politics)
- Nordicism
- Sinocentrism
  - Little China
- Xenocentrism
