= Rejection-Identification Model =

Social psychology theory

The Rejection-Identification Model, sometimes referred to by the abbreviation RIM, is a social psychological model that describes how perceived discrimination can lead individuals to strengthen their identification with an in-group. It suggests that group-based discrimination harms well-being, but identifying with that group can help protect self-esteem and therefore counteract these negative effects.

The model was developed within the framework of Social Identity Theory and has been primarily applied in research on ethnic, racial and other marginalized groups. It has been used to examine the psychological consequences of discrimination and the role of group identification in coping with identity threat.

== Development ==
The Rejection-Identification Model is based on the research of Nyla Branscombe and colleagues in 1999, which examined how African Americans maintain psychological well-being depending on how they attribute experiences to prejudice. Their findings indicated a positive relationship between experiencing discrimination and increased ethnic identity.

In proposing this model, the authors drew on key assumptions of Social Identity Theory, particularly the idea that identification with an in-group can serve as a psychological resource in response to social identity threat.

Later research extended the model to other social groups and contexts, contributing to broader discussions on the role of discrimination and exclusion in social identity processes. Over time, the Rejection-Identification Model became a reference point in research examining the psychological consequences of group-based rejection.

== Assumptions and mechanism ==
The Rejection-Identification Model is based on the assumption that social identities are a central component of individuals' self-concept and psychological well-being, which is core to Social Identity Theory. Experiences of discrimination or rejection based on group membership are therefore understood as threats to social identity. Within this framework, the model aims to explain how individuals respond to group-based rejection and how these responses shape identity processes.

According to the model, perceived discrimination is generally associated with negative feelings, such as lower well-being or reduced self-esteem. Minority groups often experience social discrimination and rejection by the dominant majority group, affecting their health and well-being. At the same time, the Rejection-Identification Model proposes that individuals cope with these negative effects by strengthening their identification with the affected in-group.

A key mechanism of the model is the attribution of discrimination to the group rather than to a single individual. Interpreting rejection as directed at the whole group allows individuals to protect their self-esteem by becoming more highly identified with their in-group and rejecting the discriminatory treatment of out-group members.

=== Identification ===
In the Rejection-Identification Model, increased identification with the in-group represents the central coping mechanism when facing discrimination. Experiencing rejection is assumed to heighten the importance of group membership in order to feel supported and valued. As a result, individuals may develop a stronger attachment to their group and assign greater importance to shared group membership.

This increased identification can have multiple psychological benefits. It can enhance feelings of belonging and social support, reinforce a positive evaluation of the in-group and restore self-esteem and self-value. By emphasizing collective identity, individuals can gain self-worth from group membership even though they are being excluded by an out-group. In this way, the model predicts that identification with the in-group can buffer the negative effects of discrimination on personal well-being.

=== Disidentification ===
The Rejection-Identification Model primarily focuses on increased in-group identification as a response to rejection, but further research has shown that reactions can vary. In some cases, perceived discrimination can also be associated with reduced identification with the out-group, as well as increased negative attitudes toward out-group members.

These processes are described in the Rejection-Disidentification Model, a related theoretical approach that builds on the Group Engagement Model. The Rejection-Disidentification Model proposes that discrimination can lead not only to stronger in-group identification but also to decreased identification with the out-group. While conceptually related, this model only represents an extension to the original Rejection-Identification Model that complements it in terms of attitudes toward the out-group.

== Empirical evidence and application ==
Empirical research has examined the assumptions of the Rejection-Identification Model across a range of social contexts, suggesting that its proposed mechanisms are not limited to a single type of social identity. In doing so, many scholars have found empirical evidence supporting the claims of the model.

Initial empirical support for the Rejection-Identification Model comes from research on ethnic minorities. The original article proposing the model examined African Americans' responses to discrimination and found that experiences of rejection were associated with stronger ethnic identification. This increased identification was also linked to higher self-esteem and psychological well-being. Other scholars have also found evidence supporting the model in the contexts of racial minorities.

Subsequent research extended the model to immigrant populations. Studies have shown that perceived discrimination among immigrants is associated with stronger identification with their ethnic or national in-group, which can serve as a coping mechanism in response to exclusion by the host society.

The Rejection-Identification Model has also been applied to religious groups. Research indicates that experiences of discrimination based on religion can lead to individuals strengthening their identification with their religious in-group.

Evidence for the model has further been found in studies focusing on age-based discrimination. Research on older adults suggests that perceived ageism can increase identification with one's age group, which can function as a psychological resource in coping with negative stereotypes and social exclusion.

The model has also been applied to appearance-based social identities. For example, studies on individuals with visible body piercings have shown that perceived stigmatization can lead to stronger identification with others who share this characteristic.

== Controversies ==
Although the Rejection-Identification Model has received empirical support, researchers have also identified several limitations. Some studies suggest that an increase in in-group identification does not always lead to improved well-being and, under some circumstances, can be associated with heightened intergroup tension or reduced engagement with broader social groups.

Empirical findings further suggest that the strength of the relationships proposed by the model can vary depending on contextual and individual factors, such as group status and the nature of discriminatory experiences. These variations have been discussed in relation to related theoretical approaches that address differing identity responses to rejection.
