= Social identity threat =

Theory in social psychology

Social identity threat is a theory in social psychology derived from social identity theory to explain the different types of threats that arise from group identity being threatened as opposed to personal identity. This theory distinguishes between four distinct types of social identity threats: categorization threat, distinctiveness threat, threats to the value of social identity, and acceptance threat. Each type is associated with particular social contexts that make the threats more or less likely to occur. This theory emphasizes how the level of commitment with the social identity shapes the nature of the threat experienced.

== Components of the theory ==
The four components of social identity threat were developed by Nyla R. Branscombe, Naomi Ellemers, Russell Spears, and Bertjan Doosje (1999). Each threat is experienced differently depending on the level of identification with the group identity.

=== Categorization threat ===
Categorization threat happens when individuals are involuntarily assigned stereotypical characteristics or judged on the basis of their group membership. This theory suggests that there are certain social contexts where people want to be seen as unique individuals who have their own personal characteristics or accomplishments, and if instead, they are categorized in accordance with a group membership such as gender, ethnicity, or political orientation, then they would be resistant to the identity and feel as if they are being treated unfairly.

This resistance to categorization is especially pronounced when the assigned membership seems irrelevant or inappropriate to the situation at hand (even if the identity is normally one which they strongly identify with) such as gender in the workforce. Individuals might even opt to hide stigmatized group membership in order to avoid the possible consequences of being categorized. Other identities like gender or ethnicity cannot be concealed, thus making it impossible to prevent others from categorizing them in specific ways.

Since individuals have a multitude of identities they can be categorized as, the theory suggests that people might prefer identities that they have self-selected rather than identities in which they are given. However, the authors argue that willingness to identify with an identity is determined most by the level of commitment towards an identity versus another competing identity. The authors recommended further research be conducted exploring the specific conditions that lead to identification with one identity over another. Regardless, based on principles from social identity theory and self-categorization theory theorizing that identities which are assigned can still determine how individuals see and define themselves, the researchers believed in the importance of examining both self-selected and socially assigned identities.

People who do not identify strongly with an identity are most likely to resist categorization threat, especially when the categorization is involuntarily imposed on them. When identity is emphasized, these low-identifiers distance themselves from the group, emphasize their individual identity, and might even demean ingroup members. High-performing individuals placed into a group with low status are likelier to disidentify because they view the group membership as threatening to their reputation and high self-esteem. Low-identifying members experience negative affective emotions such as anger, low self-esteem, or depression. Also, involuntary categorization into groups which are not valued or negatively stereotyped can lead to the individual emphasizing the shared qualities between groups and the heterogeneity in the in-group. People who are stereotyped into groups expected to perform badly on a task actually do end up performing worse. This has been more commonly documented as stereotype threat.

=== Distinctiveness threat ===
Distinctiveness threat occurs when individuals are concerned about not having a unique social identity or having an identity that is indistinguishable from other comparable groups. According to research done by Tajfel and colleagues, individuals rely on distinct identities as a way to find meaning and define themselves in the world. After a distinct identity is formed, social comparison with similar groups can pose a potential threat to group distinctiveness. In other words, because humans desire to have a unique personal identity, they pursue a distinct group identity in order to distinguish themselves from others.

In the context of distinctiveness threat, discrimination against other groups only occur when the differences between the groups are unclear or minimal. The minimal group paradigm suggest that people favor in-group members and discriminate against out-group members based on arbitrary group assignments like painter preferences. Some researchers demonstrated that when individuals were given meaningful reasons between the differentiation (i.e. people who like painter A are more extroverted than painter B), discrimination decreased because individuals were presumably more secure and certain about their identity.

Some studies also demonstrate that people are more likely to choose a distinct identity over a positive identity. For example, Polish students would rather embrace some stereotypically negative traits of their nation than emphasize the similarities between all European countries. While research demonstrates the importance of having distinctive identities over ones with positive traits, the embrace of negative traits are more common among people who strongly identify with the group rather than low-identifiers.

People are likelier to identify with groups that are numerically smaller versus majority groups. People also seek belonging in groups, which tend to be found in smaller tight-knit groups than larger groups. Similarly, individuals identify more with minority groups relative to majority groups because there are distinct cultures found in minority groups that may not be present in majority groups, despite the politically and economically disadvantages of minority groups in society.

Once the group identity is established, social comparison with other similar groups may cause conflict and lead to differentiation. People who strongly identify with the group will engage in differentiation while low-identifiers are not as threatened and might prefer to identify as individuals or in categories involving both groups.

While direct differentiation between groups is one strategy when faced with distinctiveness threat, it may be unrealistic in cases where the two groups are actually quite similar. So, those who strongly identify with the group will engage in other responses like identifying with the group even more by self-stereotyping. The authors emphasize how the concept of distinctiveness threat demonstrates that groups discriminate against out-groups, not necessarily because distinctiveness is threatened, but rather in order to achieve or maintain the distinctiveness between the two groups. When resolving distinctiveness conflict among groups, a common result is to acknowledge that the other group has some positive traits while also acknowledging that their own group has positive traits, allowing for members of both groups to keep their positive distinct self-image.

=== Value threat ===
Value threat refers to when the group value is undermined by a source of threat ranging from outgroups, neutral sources, or even ingroup members on dimensions such as competence or morality. When one's social identity is being explicitly attacked by an outgroup member (e.g. verbally insulted), then this can result in outgroup derogation. Perceptions of discrimination based on group membership (e.g. the more Black Americans felt discriminated based on their race) can also result in increased hostility.

When high-identifiers are faced with value threats, they tend to both self-affirm the value of their identity and self-stereotype themselves to be prototypical of the group. Moreover, if members of a group believe that their group has been unjustly persecuted resulting in their stigmatized group status, then their ingroup affiliation will increase, as well as their out-group derogation.

The source of the threat could also be symbolic and still invoke similar reactions as threats from out-groups. In a study by Branscombe and Wann (1994), they found that simply watching a video where a Russian boxer beat an American boxer invoked reductions in self esteem among people who strongly identified as American (there was no effect for people who did not strongly identify as American). Reductions in self-esteem were also directly linked to outgroup derogation. Level of identification with the group is a significant factor in determining the impact of the threat and subsequent reactions to the threat.

Besides direct outgroup derogation, when the ingroup is depicted as inferior to a competing outgroup, other defensive responses may occur. In situations where the status-dimension is taken into account and social reality is hard to dispute (e.g. sports team losing), then direct in-group favoritism is not effective. Only high identifiers are likely to reinforce or demonstrate their commitment to the group by actions like perceiving the ingroup as homogenous, taking on prototypical group traits, and stereotyping the group on other dimensions.

As identification with the group becomes stronger, ingroup members will protect the group in the moral dimension of value threats as well. This response can occur in both low-status and high-status groups. For instance, high-identifying White Americans who are reminded of the privileges they have due to their race score higher on a racism scale compared to low-identifying White Americans. To resolve the dissonance from having pride in being White and the history of racism perpetrated by White Americans, high-identifying White Americans engage in out-group derogation, while low-identifying white Americans experience no such increase in out-group hostility and instead experience a decrease in self-esteem. The authors argue that strong identification with a group leads to feelings of linked fate, where one experiences emotions based on the group despite not necessarily being involved in the group's past or future decisions.

The strength of identification with a group also affects how one evaluates feedback from the out-group versus the in-group. In a study examining the effects of identity threat (whether the person is rated as positively or negatively as a result of their group membership) on self-esteem, participants received either positive or negative feedback from in-group or outgroup members. Positive feedback was generally more well-received than negative, but feedback from an in-group member was always deemed as more reliable than an out-group member regardless of the content. In-group members' opinions may be seen as more value because they are an important part of one's identity and are supposed to be accepting of the individual. Additionally, those who were low-identifying suffered more self-esteem loss from negative feedback compared to high-identifying individuals.

=== Acceptance threat ===
Acceptance threat deals with whether one is accepted by their own in-group. Many social groups like jobs, sororities or fraternities, or churches have various requirements to entry. These requirements allow the organization to see whether the member is suitable for entry and may increase the member's commitment once they are accepted into the group. The authors argue that while acceptance threat may present similarly like the other threats (i.e. outgroup derogation), the internal processes are different. Taking from self-categorization theory which implies that people act strategically in ways that indicate who they want to align themselves with, individuals who have multiple conflicting identities have to choose which identity to publicly align with. After choosing an identity, members must try and prove their allegiance, and they may do so by devaluing the other group.

People who have or feel insecure about their place in group are most likely to engage in behaviors that are prototypical of the group. While these behaviors may manifests itself differently depending on the group that one wants to gain entry for, individuals just desire to be accepted into the in-group they favor. Some experiments have demonstrated that people engage in in-group favoritism and out-group derogation when faced with uncertainty, with people who are more insecure about their group standing strongly supporting leaders who are biased towards their in-group rather than leaders who are equitable.

The reactions of people who are seeking entry to a group are similar to the reactions of individuals who are faced with the possibility for being excluded from the group, or at the very least, demoted. If the individual cares about the identity, then they will engage in the aforementioned behaviors to try and maintain their status. They will even evaluate a person who is more prototypical of the group more favorably than someone who is more similar to themselves to preserve the distinctiveness of the group. However, for individuals who are low-identifying, they will not try to stay in the group's good graces because they already expect to be negatively perceived by the group. Interestingly, their self-categorization of themselves as low-identifying will be validated by the group's perception of them as non-prototypical.

Whether the group's elite members recognize the individual's commitment to the group is another way in which one can gain acceptance from the group. Since rejection by an ingroup is seen as distressing to those who are high-identifying, they might over-compensate by adhering strictly to all of the expectations associated with the group. Meanwhile, if the individual seems to value themselves over the group (forsaking the group when it becomes disadvantageous to them), then the group elites might have a negative impression of them. People who act in this way tend to be low-identifying, so these people may be rejected by those who are highly committed to the group. This pattern of low-identifying individuals being rejected by the group, therefore they do not try to fit in, may become a cycle, where a subgroup might come to believe that they do not belong in the group in the first place.

== See also ==
- Defensive help
