= Self-stereotyping =

Concept in psychology

In social psychology, self-stereotyping (or autostereotyping) is a process by which an individual integrates and internalizes commonly held characterizations (i.e. stereotypes or prototypes) of an in-group into their self-concept. It is described as part of social identity theory (SIT) and, more specifically, self-categorization theory (SCT).

According to SIT, group membership is most likely to influence self-concept and self-esteem when the cognitive processes of identification and categorization interact. In other words, when an individual identifies strongly with a group and categorizes him or herself as a member of that group, group membership becomes integrated into the person’s identity.

== Description ==
Self-stereotyping has also been characterized as an overlap between how a person represents their ingroup and how they represent the self. Prior to self-stereotyping, one experiences depersonalization, the process of shedding one's unique identity to merge it with the group identity of the in-group while simultaneously separating themselves from the out-group. Members of low-status groups have been found to be more prone to self-stereotyping than members of high-status groups. Research suggests that members of low-status groups attribute ingroup characteristics to the self via a deduction-to-the-self process. That is, they accept stereotypical characteristics (both positive and negative) of their ingroup as reflective of themselves. Latrofa and colleagues (2012) suggest self-stereotyping increases when low-status groups feel threatened and individuals within the group see more similarities between the group and themselves. Low-status groups' responses to threatening events are influenced by the collective emotion of the group. In contrast, it has been suggested that members of high-status groups tend to project their personal characteristics onto their ingroup using an induction-to-the-ingroup cognitive strategy.

=== Positive and negative ===
Self-stereotyping can be characterized as negative and positive. Groups tend to be more accepting of positive stereotypes and ascribe it to themselves and their group, but reject negative stereotypes. However, negative self-stereotyping is sometimes accepted by individuals when it protects the individual from failure and poor judgment being ascribed to the performance of the individual rather than the group.

=== Implicit and explicit ===
Self-stereotyping can also occur both implicitly and explicitly. Implicit self-stereotyping is when an individual unconsciously shifts their own beliefs to match that of their social group while explicit self-stereotyping is consciously shifting one’s behavioral traits to match their social group.

== Factors ==
=== Age ===
Self-stereotyping emerges in early adolescence then decreases in young adulthood. It has been described as a form of depersonalization in which the self is viewed as a categorically interchangeable member of a salient ingroup. The growth of one’s social identity can directly relate to a decline in one's personal identity since conforming to group goals influences an individual's beliefs and behaviors.

=== Gender ===
Self-stereotyping by gender is seen in children as early as five-years-old. Research examining gender-based self-stereotyping has characterized female ingroups as low status and male ingroups as high status. This is because in modern society gender inequality still exists. Women have been shown to self-stereotype more than men, yet self-stereotyping decreases in men when presented with gender equality information. Coleman and Hong (2008) have pointed out that when women believe gender differences are attributed to biology differences between men and women, negative self-stereotyping also increases. Furthermore, implicit gender self-categorization has been identified as a key mechanism underlying the tendency of women to self-stereotype.

=== Environment ===
Self-stereotyping is not only limited to social group settings, it can also occur with environmental cues. In other words, when an individual is exposed to something in their environment that is relevant to their low status identity, they may shift their own beliefs or behaviors to fit the low status identity. The effects of environmental factors on self stereotyping among low status groups has been studied in gay men. A study found that being in a gay space, such as a gay bookstore, tended to make gay men identify very strongly with positive traits that are stereotypically gay. This pronounced self stereotyping trend was not found in the studied gay men in neutral spaces or heterosexual men.

=== Culture ===
Research has shown that individualist cultures engage in more self-stereotyping because they rely more on interpersonal relationships, group cohesion, and in-group ties compared to collectivist cultures.

=== Group dynamic ===
Some researchers have found that self-stereotyping is somewhat dependent upon an individual’s belief that he/she and the group are capable of change. If the individual believes that the group's needs are different from their own, they may have to adapt his/her self-representation in order to maintain membership within the in-group. However, if other in-group members are flexible to change, an individual is more likely to maintain his/her self-image and avoid self-stereotyping. Individuals tend to adapt to group characteristics more readily if they see this change as an enhancement to the self. Therefore, the individual's perception of the group influences how much he or she is willing to sacrifice in order to be a member.

=== Bisexuality ===
An essential aspect of self stereotyping in low status groups is the presence of a clear prototype. A study investigated the effect that self stereotyping had on bisexual people’s self esteem, identity uncertainty, mood, and stress. This study found that self-stereotyping did not cause bisexual individuals to experience the same well-being boosts observed when other individuals in low status groups, including gay and lesbian people, engage in self-stereotyping. These results may be attributed to the fact that bisexuality, due to being neither heterosexual nor homosexual, is an identity that lacks a distinct and clearly defined group; this absence of a clearly defined group means that there is no defined prototype.

== Health ==
Members of low status groups may experience prejudice, discrimination, and stress which may negatively impact their physical health. Self-stereotyping has been linked to affecting the physical and emotional health of low status group members who engage in more negative self-stereotyping. River and Paradez (2014) found that negative self-stereotyping can have a negative effect on the self-esteem of low status individuals, therefore making them more likely to experience obesity.

== Implications ==
=== Social influence ===
Researchers have explored relationships between self-stereotyping and notable figures in low status groups. Rivera and Benitez (2016) found that when members of low status groups strongly identify with their low status identity and are shown positive examples of role models in their group, they engage in less self-stereotyping.

== See also ==
- Internalized oppression
  - Internalized ableism
  - Internalized racism
  - Internalized sexism
  - Self-hating Jew
- Respectability politics
- Social identity threat
- Social identity theory
- Social identity approach
