= Self-categorization theory =

Theory in social psychology

Self-categorization theory is a theory in social psychology that describes the circumstances under which a person will perceive collections of people (including themselves) as a group, as well as the consequences of perceiving people in group terms. Although the theory is often introduced as an explanation of psychological group formation (which was one of its early goals), it is more accurately thought of as general analysis of the functioning of categorization processes in social perception and interaction that speaks to issues of individual identity as much as group phenomena. It was developed by John Turner and colleagues, and along with social identity theory it is a constituent part of the social identity approach. It was in part developed to address questions that arose in response to social identity theory about the mechanistic underpinnings of social identification.

Self-categorization theory has been influential in the academic field of social psychology and beyond. It was first applied to the topics of social influence, group cohesion, group polarization, and collective action. In subsequent years the theory, often as part of the social identity approach, has been applied to further topics such as leadership, personality, outgroup homogeneity, and power. One tenet of the theory is that the self should not be considered as a foundational aspect of cognition, but rather the self should be seen as a product of the cognitive system at work.

== Aspects of the theory ==
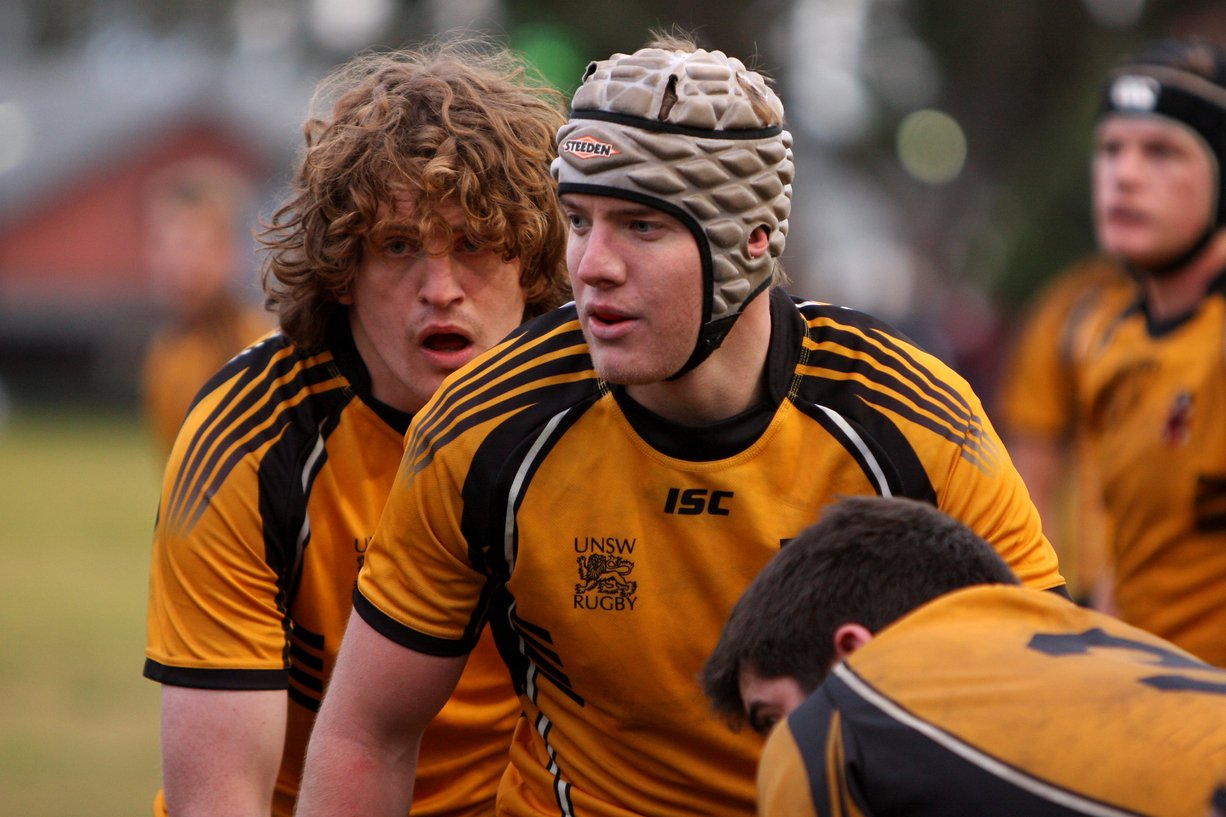
The clear intergroup structure of team sports means that such contexts are often used to illustrate self-categorization theory processes.

=== Levels of abstraction ===
Drawing inspiration from cognitive psychology, self-categorization theory assumes that the self can be categorized at various levels of abstraction. In other words, humans may categorize the self as a singular "I"(personal identity), or as a more inclusive "we"(social identity). In the latter case the self is cognitively grouped as identical and interchangeable to other stimuli within that category. It is argued that it is this variation in self categorization that underpins many intergroup phenomena, including those described in social identity theory.

To demonstrate the notion of varying levels of abstraction and inclusiveness, three types of self category are often given as examples. The lowest level of abstraction is given as a personal self, where the perceiver self categorizes as "I". A higher level of abstraction corresponds to a social self, where the perceiver self categorizes as "we" in comparison to a salient outgroup (them). A highest level of abstraction is represented by we humans, where the salient outgroup is animals or other non-humans. A common misconception is that these three example categories represent the self categories that humans use. Instead, the theory posits that there are innumerable self categories that a perceiver may use (see, online category formation), and in particular that there are a myriad of different personal and social identities that a perceiver may invoke in his or her day-to-day life. The misconception may also be attributable to the early writing of Turner where a singular social identity was contrasted against a singular personal identity. This however predates the formal statement of self-categorization theory.

==== Accentuation ====
In self-categorization theory, categorizing people does not simply involve the redescription of characteristics and categories present in social stimuli. Rather, salient social categories form the basis of a social world that is enriched with meaning. This is achieved through a non-conscious process of accentuation, where differences between social categories are accentuated along with the similarities within social categories. The resulting augmentation of social content allows the perceiver to interact with others with greater confidence and ease.

The accentuation component of self-categorization theory stems from prior research that demonstrated an accentuation effect for categorized non-social stimuli. A prototypical example of non-social accentuation came from Tajfel and Wilkes, who found that when a categorization scheme corresponded to line length participants would view lines belonging to different categories as more different than if no categorization scheme was present. Consistent with the idea that an efficient cognitive system would, where possible, use the same systems regardless of the social or non-social nature of the stimuli, self-categorization theorists have demonstrated similar effects for social stimuli. For example, Haslam and Turner found that a perceiver would describe another person as more or less similar to themselves as a function of the likely categorization scheme.

=== Depersonalization and self-stereotyping ===
According to self-categorization theory, depersonalization describes a process of self-stereotyping. This is where, under conditions of social category salience and consequent accentuation, "people come to see themselves more as the interchangeable exemplars of a social category than as unique personalities defined by their differences from others". Under these conditions a perceiver directly bases their behaviour and beliefs on the norms, goals and needs of a salient ingroup. For example, if a person's salient self-category becomes 'army officer' then that person is more likely to act in terms of the norms associated with that category (e.g. to wear a uniform, follow orders, and distrust an enemy) and less likely to act in terms of other potential self-categories. Here the person can be said to be accentuating the similarities between his or herself and other members of the 'army officers' category.

Turner and colleagues stress that depersonalization is not a loss of self, but rather a redefinition of the self in terms of group membership. A depersonalized self, or a social identity, is every bit as valid and meaningful as a personalized self, or personal identity. A loss of self is sometimes referred to using the alternative term deindividuation. Further, although the term depersonalization has been used in clinical psychology to describe a type of disordered experience, this is completely different from depersonalization in the sense intended by self-categorization theory authors.

The concept of depersonalization is critical to a range of group phenomena including social influence, social stereotyping, in-group cohesiveness, ethnocentrism, intragroup cooperation, altruism, emotional empathy, and the emergence of social norms.

=== Determinants of categorization ===
In self-categorization theory the formation and use of a social category in a certain context is predicted by an interaction between perceiver readiness and category-stimulus fit. The latter being broken down into comparative fit and normative fit. This predictive interaction was heavily influenced by Bruner's accessibility and fit formula. A social category that is currently in use is called a salient social category, and in the case of a self category is called a salient social identity. The latter should not be confused with level of identification, which is a component of perceiver readiness.

==== Perceiver readiness ====
Perceiver readiness, which Turner first described as relative accessibility, "reflects a person's past experiences, present expectations, and current motives, values, goals and needs". It is the relevant aspects of cognition that the perceiver brings to the environment. For example, a perceiver who categorizes frequently on the basis of nationality (e.g., "we Americans") is, due to that past experience, more likely to formulate a similar self category under new conditions. Accordingly, social identification, or the degree to which the group is valued and self-involving, may be thought of as an important factor that affects a person's readiness to use a particular social category.

==== Comparative fit ====
Comparative fit is determined by the meta-contrast principle—which states that people are more likely to believe that a collection of stimuli represents an entity to the degree that the differences between those stimuli are less than the differences between that collection of stimuli and other stimuli. For predicting whether a group will categorize an individual as an ingroup or outgroup member, the meta-contrast principle may be defined as the ratio of the average similarity of the individual to outgroup members over the average similarity of the individual to ingroup members. The meta-contrast ratio is dependent on the context, or frame of reference, in which the categorization process is occurring. That is, the ratio is a comparison based on whichever stimuli are cognitively present. For example, if the frame of reference is reduced such that potential outgroup members are no longer cognitively present, ingroup members regard the individual as less similar to the group and are less likely to categorize that individual as belonging to that group.

==== Normative fit ====
Normative fit is the extent that the perceived behaviour or attributes of an individual or collection of individuals conforms to the perceiver's knowledge-based expectations. Thus, normative fit is evaluated with reference to the perceiver readiness component of the categorisation process. As an example of the role of normative fit in categorization, although a collection of individuals may be categorized as an entity on the basis of comparative fit, they are only labelled using the specific social category of "science students" if perceived as hard working. That is, they fit the normative content of that category.

=== Online category formation ===
Self-categorization theorists posit "self-categorization is comparative, inherently variable, fluid and context dependent." They reject the notion that self concepts are stored invariant structures that exist ready for application. Where stability is observed in self perception this is not attributed to stored stable categories, but rather to stability in both the perceiver and the social context in which the perceiver is situated. This variability is systematic and occurs in response to the changing context in which the perceiver is situated. As an example, the category of psychologists can be perceived quite differently if compared to physicists as opposed to artists (with variation perhaps on how scientific psychologists are perceived to be). In self-categorization theory contextual changes to the salient social category are sometimes referred to as shifting prototypicality.

Although the theory accepts that prior categorization behaviour impacts present perception (i.e., as part of perceiver readiness), self-categorization theory has key advantages over descriptions of social categorization where categories are rigid and invariant cognitive structures that are stored in comparative isolation prior to application. One advantage is that this perspective removes the implausibility of storing enough categorical information to account for all the nuanced categorization that humans use daily. Another advantage is that it brings social cognition in line with a connectionist approach to cognition. The connectionist approach is a neurologically plausible model of cognition where semantic units are not stored, but rather semantic information forms as a consequence of network pattern activation (both current and prior).

=== Prototypicality ===
In social psychology a category prototype may be thought of as a "representative exemplar" of a category. Self-categorization theory predicts that what is prototypical of a category is contingent on the context in which the category is encountered. More specifically, when the comparative context changes (i.e., the psychologically available stimuli change) this has implications for how the self category is perceived and the nature of subsequent depersonalization. Self-categorization theory predicts that individuals adopt the features of a salient self category (self-stereotyping), and the content of the category they adopt depends on the present comparative context.

An individual's degree of prototypicality also varies in relation to changes in the comparative context, and self-categorization theory expects this to have direct implications for interpersonal phenomenon. Specifically, prototypicality plays an important role in the social identity approach to leadership, influence, and interpersonal attraction. For example, on interpersonal attraction, self-categorization theory states that "self and others are evaluated positively to the degree that they are perceived as prototypical (representative, exemplary, etc.) of the next more inclusive (positively valued) self-category of which they are being compared".

Levels of individual prototypicality may be gauged using the meta-contrast principle, and indeed it is this purpose the meta-contrast ratio is more often used for. Furthermore, although prototypicality is most often discussed in relation to the perception of individuals within a group, groups may also be assessed in terms of how prototypical they are of a superordinate category.

== Implications ==
=== Social influence ===
Self-categorization theory provides an account of social influence. This account is sometimes referred to as the theory of referent informational influence. According to self-categorization theory, as social identities become salient, and depersonalization and self-stereotyping occurs, people adopt the norms, beliefs, and behaviors of fellow ingroup members. They also distance themselves from the norms, beliefs, and behaviors of comparison outgroup members. When someone observes a difference between themselves and a fellow ingroup member that person will experience subjective uncertainty. That uncertainty can be resolved by either a) recategorizing people or the situation to reflect those perceived differences, or b) engaging in a social influence process whereby one person makes changes to become more similar to the other. Which person adopts the views or behaviors of the other (i.e. who influences who) is predicted to be that person who is most prototypical of the ingroup. In other words, the person who exemplifies the norms, values, and behaviors of the ingroup the most. The self-categorization theory account of social influence has received a large amount of empirical support.

Self-categorization theory's account of social influence differs from other social psychological approaches to social influence. It rejects the traditional distinction between informational influence and normative influence, where informational influence involves the assessment of social information based on its merit and normative influence involves public compliance to the expectations of group members. For self-categorization theory social information does not have merit independent of self-categorization. Instead, information is perceived as valid to the extent that it is perceived to be a normative belief of the ingroup. Normative influence, on the other hand, is not normative at all. Rather, it is counter-normative influence based compliance to expectations of psychological outgroup members. In a similar vein self-categorization theory also challenges the distinction between objective reality testing and social reality testing (e.g. the elaboration likelihood model). It argues that there is no such thing as objective reality testing isolated from social reality testing. Sensory data is always interpreted with respect of the beliefs and ideas of the perceiver, which in turn are bound up in the psychological group memberships of that perceiver.

=== Out-group homogeneity ===
Outgroup homogeneity can be defined as seeing the outgroup members as more homogeneous than ingroup members. Self-categorization accounts for the outgroup homogeneity effect as a function of perceiver motivation and the resultant comparative context, which is a description of the psychologically available stimuli at any one time. The theory argues that when perceiving an outgroup the psychologically available stimuli include both ingroup and outgroup members. Under these conditions the perceiver is more likely to categorize in accordance with ingroup and outgroup memberships and is consequently naturally motivated to accentuate intergroup differences as well as intragroup similarities. Conversely, when perceiving an ingroup the outgroup members may not be psychologically available. In such circumstances there is no ingroup-outgroup categorization and thus no accentuation. Indeed, accentuation of intragroup differences may occur under these circumstances for the same sense making reasons.

In line with this explanation it has been shown that in an intergroup context both the ingroup and outgroup is perceived as more homogeneous, while when judged in isolation the ingroup is perceived as comparatively heterogeneous. This is also congruent with depersonalization, where under certain circumstances perceivers may see themselves as interchangeable members of the ingroup. The self-categorization theory eliminates the need to posit differing processing mechanisms for ingroups and outroups, as well as accounting for findings of outgroup homogeneity in the minimal group paradigm.

== Controversies ==
=== Meta-theoretical debate ===
The social identity approach explicitly rejects the metatheory of research that regards limited information processing as the cause of social stereotyping. Specifically, where other researchers adopt the position that stereotyping is second best to other information processing techniques (e.g., individuation), social identity theorists argue that in many contexts a stereotypical perspective is entirely appropriate. Moreover, it is argued that in many intergroup contexts to take an individualistic view would be decidedly maladaptive and demonstrate ignorance of important social realities.

=== Category hierarchies ===
Self-categorization theory emphasises the role of category hierarchies in social perception. That is, much like a biological taxonomy, social groups at lower levels of abstraction are subsumed within social groups at higher levels of abstraction. A useful example comes from the world of team sports, where a particular social group such as Manchester United fans may be an ingroup for a perceiver who may compare with a relevant outgroup (e.g., Liverpool fans). However, at a higher level of abstraction, both social groups may be subsumed into the singular category of football fans. This is known as a superordinate category, and in this context those Liverpool fans once considered outgroup members are now considered fellow ingroup members. The new salient outgroup might instead be rugby fans. Awareness of category hierarchies has led to the development of the common ingroup identity model. This model suggests that conflict at one level of abstraction (e.g., between Manchester United fans and Liverpool fans) might be ameliorated by making salient a more inclusive superordinate ingroup.

It has been noted, however, that very few social groups can be described in hierarchical terms. For example, Catholic people in Germany cannot be always considered a subordinate category of Germans, as there are Catholic people throughout the globe. McGarty proposes that the theory's use of hierarchies as an organizing principle must be relaxed. The alternative proposition is that social psychologists should look to Venn-like structures for descriptions of social structure. The awareness of crossed cutting social categories has allowed for the development of further intergroup conflict reduction strategies.

=== Motivation in the theory ===
Brewer and Brown describe self-categorization theory as a "version of social identity theory" that is heavily cognitive and is not attentive to many motivational and affective processes. Turner and Reynolds, in response to this style of commentary, counter that describing self-categorization theory as a replacement to social identity theory is an error, and that self-categorization theory was always intended to complement social identity theory. Turner and Reynolds also argue that such commentary unreasonably discounts the motivational concerns that are articulated in self-categorization theory. For example, the motivation to maintain positive self categories and the motivation to achieve ingroup consensus.
