= Identity group =

Identity group may refer to:

- Identity (social science) – Qualities, beliefs, personality, looks and/or expressions that distinguish a person
- Social group – Two or more humans who interact with one another
- Trivial group – Group that has only one element in group theory

== See also ==
- Group identity
