= Accentuation effect =

Effect of categorization

Accentuation effect occurs when something (be it a person, place or thing) is placed into a category. The differences between the categories are then exaggerated, and differences within the categories themselves are minimised. Memory of anything that can be categorized is subject to an accentuation effect in which the memory is distorted toward typical examples.

In the case of people, the accentuation effect is similar to stereotyping and social categorization in that when classified as part of a group, people's features seem to more closely match their classification rather than any individual differences they have.

The effect was first identified by Henri Tajfel in the late 1950s.

== Judgement ==
The accentuation effect often works to create more polarized judgements within individuals. A study conducted by Eiser, 1971, showed this through people’s judgements of different attitude statements. Those who were judging were asked to rate a variety of statements regarding the non-medical use of drugs from being ‘extremely permissive’ to ‘extremely restrictive’. The group which received the statements already categorized into two distinct groups, one being from anti-drug newspapers and the other being from pro-drug newspapers, accentuated the differences between these two groups as opposed to those from the control condition. This resulted in the polarization of their judgements regarding the statements and where they belong on the scale. Once judgements are grouped into different categories, people often accentuate the subjective differences between them.

Another way in which this occurs is when the response language of questions is manipulated. In another study, that was testing people’s response to statements as being pro or anti, when the pro was at the positive end of the scale and anti was at the negative end of the scale, those that agree with the statement accentuate their judgement and label them in a more polarized ways, whereas those that disagreed with the statement labelled them in less polarized ways. The opposite effect is seen when the scale is switched. This ultimately means that the most polarized labels are given when the judge’s end of the scale is positively labelled.

== Intergroup accentuation ==
The accentuation effect is often found in group interactions, with group members exaggerating the differences between their ingroup and outgroup. For those in the ingroup, the accentuation of characteristics were less for the ingroup than the outgroup, suggesting that this effect may be due to distancing the outgroup from the ingroup. However, this accentuation effect didn’t just depend on the categorization of different groups, but the perceived stereotypical differences between the groups themselves. Rothbart and Lewis, 2006, demonstrated this using the perceived differences of temperament between three groups of a university marching band. The differences that were accentuated between the groups relied on how much the groups were expected to be different, despite the temperament of all three groups being close to the same. This means that groups that were stereotypically different accentuated the differences between them more so than groups that were stereotypically similar. The exaggeration took place due to the expectations as opposed to the actual group differences present.

This effect between the ingroup and the outgroup is due to a number of reasons. Those in the ingroup encode outgroup characteristics, leading to the perceived differences between the two groups, but especially from the perspective of the ingroup. Furthermore, people focus on features that are typical as opposed to atypical in groups, and when there are two clear categories in place, this information works to polarize the groups, resulting in greater differences between them. The contact between ingroups and outgroups, however, didn’t work to reduce this effect. Instead, it increased. The longer the groups spent with each other (and in the case of the study the longer people in the different groups spent in marching bands), the more they perceived that there were differences between them. The preference for the ingroup over the outgroup in the study also did not result in a correlation with the accentuation of differences, suggesting it did not play a role. However, the groups observed in the study were not hostile towards each other, as previous research has reported strong accentuation with groups that are ideologically opposed, meaning that hostility between the ingroup and outgroup as opposed to preference may result in an increased attenuation effect. The understanding of intergroup accentuation is important as it could lead to the understanding of conflict between different groups.

== Within ethnicity and faces ==
Researchers Corneille, Huart, Becquart, and Bredart found that, when participants looked at ethnically ambiguous faces, certain ethnic features that stood out caused participants to falsely remember the person more toward an ethnic category than they actually were. Researchers used Caucasian or North African faces, and morphed them to be either low, moderate, or high on stereotypical features. The faces that were moderately stereotypical of either a Caucasian or North African person were falsely recollected in memory as more Caucasian or North African than they actually were. This is evidence for how distortions in memory are due to stereotypical conceptions that are held about certain ethnicities. (Corneille et al. 2004).

Research by Freeman & Ambady, 2011a, found that when faces with neutral facial features or ambiguous facial features are placed in ethnically specific locations, individuals tend to associate the neutral facial features as belonging to the specific ethnicity of that particular location. A specific location might include a scene of the Great Wall of China with a neutral facial feature displayed across it or an image of the US Capital with neutral facial features flashed across the image. When a Chinese scene with a neutral facial feature is shown, the participant more quickly associate the neutral facial features as Asian and likewise, when an American scene appears, the participant more quickly categorize the neutral facial features as White. However, when a neutral facial picture is presented with a neutral scene, the results depend on the ethnicity of the person responding. This suggests that similarity and settings are directly related to an individual's ability to recall and associate, playing a vital role in social categorization and stereotyping.

Association and categorization of multiracial facial features are also impacted by specific locations or context, however achieved in a slightly differing manner, according to Pauker and Ambady. Those categorizing individual's with multiracial features struggle with the ambiguity of their look, resulting in uncertainty and the need for further clarification from the multiracial individual. Those with multiracial features may, as a result, depend less on external cues and classification and more on their own individual concept of race and what it means.

== Social categorization – the benefits and negative effects ==
Social categorization has its benefits as well as its obvious negatives. First, it is important to understand that the categorization of individuals into different social groups is, for the most part, an unconscious and natural reaction. Research by Lee, Jussim, & McCauley, 1995, suggests that categorizing things, including people, is helpful because with the multifaceted, intricate world in which we live, individuals categorize things and people in order to better process and understand information around them. However, there is also a danger with social categorization. For those that are categorized and stereotyped, it removes the person's individuality, their unique traits, beliefs and mannerisms and for those doing the categorization, it misrepresents their view of the groups or individuals and results in all within the categorized group being treated the same way. This theory was tested through an experiment conducted by Tajfel & Wilkes, 1963. Tajfel & Wilkes study highlighted how lines of differing lengths, when grouped together are perceived to be the same length, but when categorized (by color change) the lines are perceived to be different lengths.

== Within temperature estimates ==
A study at Brown University found accentuation effects happened when participants were asked to estimate average temperatures in days throughout the year. Typically, four days in a month were used, i.e., September 2, 10, 18, and 28, and the average high and low temperatures were estimated for each day. Results of this study found that when estimating the temperature, there was more of a jump in temperature estimates between months as opposed to estimates within months. Even though the temperature rises and falls fairly steadily with each passing day through the year, participants assume there is more of a drop in temperature, for example, between August 25 and September 2 than there is between September 2 and September 10, based entirely on the idea that August is warmer than September. (Krueger & Clement 1994).

== Within money ==
=== Currency ===
In Tadeusz Tyszka and Krzysztof Przybyszewski's "Cognitive and Emotional Factors Affecting Currency Perception" they found that although money is known to have a nominal value, the perception of its value is often accentuated because of emotional connection. In other words, people who value a certain country's currency very highly may presume that something may have a higher value if say in US dollars versus as if it is expressed in Euros, even if the actual value does not reflect the same idea. If someone has strong emotional ties to a country they may see the value of something being greater than it really is, simply because it is expressed in their great country's currency. Likewise, they determined that people that have poor opinions about a country or culture may devalue their currency even if the rate is inaccurate. For example, if someone thinks a country is mostly poverty-stricken it may accentuate this idea of poverty and so they may value that currency lower than its nominal value. (Tyszka & Przybyszewski 2006).

=== Monetary value ===
Powerlessness of individuals is observed to accentuate how they represent objects with monetary value physically. This physical representation of the objects related to its monetary value manifests itself through changes in size. This means that objects will be perceived as larger than they are the more monetary value they hold, unless the value is associated with its small size, where it will instead be perceived smaller. Researchers Dubois, Rucker, and Galinksy, 2010, demonstrated this through an experiment that assigned participants three power rankings (high, low, and baseline), achieving this by providing an imaginary scenario encompassing one of these rankings. The participants were then asked to draw to different objects with monetary value. The individuals that were designated low power rankings, and had a sense of powerlessness, increased the size of objects that were associated with monetary value. This was not seen in participants with high or baseline power rankings. The more associated an object was with monetary value, the more that those who felt powerless distorted the size. Objects that didn’t hold monetary value, such as blank discs, were drawn the same size by all groups, suggesting that this effect is only observed to objects with value.

The researchers theorized that the lack in power led to participants compensating for this through changing the physical representation of objects associated with monetary value, as there is an increased need for them to restore the power that they’ve lost. The relationship with powerlessness and monetary value itself may be due to the nature of the restoration of power within people, as individuals will try to achieve this by obtaining high-status objects in order to increase their standing in the social hierarchy.

== Real world examples ==
One example that researchers presented was that after an Italian colleague returned from a two-week vacation in Italy, his friends noticed that his hair and eyes were lighter than they had remembered. This happened because his categorization as Italian caused them to remember him with darker hair and eyes than he actually had. Thus, while there was no actual change in his hair and eye color, their memory of his features had been shifted to match what the stereotype of an Italian looks like, rather than his actual appearance.(Corneille et al. 2004).

== See also ==
- Illusory correlation
- Social identity theory
- Out-group homogeneity
