= Helping behavior =

Voluntarily prosocial behaviour

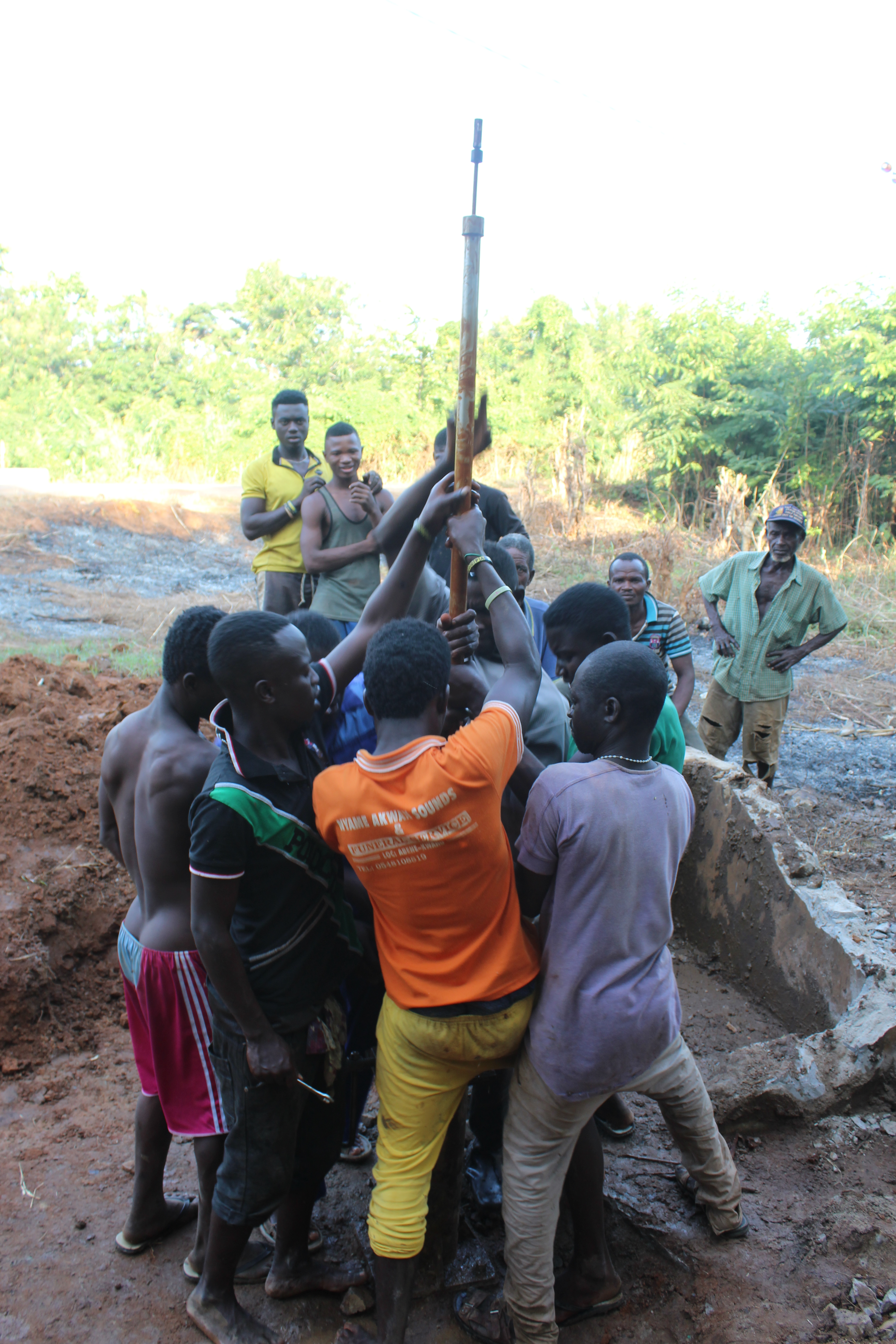
Workers and people from the nearby town helping repair a water borehole in Ghana

Helping behavior refers to voluntary actions intended to help others, with reward regarded or disregarded. It is a type of prosocial behavior (voluntary action intended to help or benefit another individual or group of individuals, such as sharing, comforting, rescuing and helping).

Altruism is distinguished from helping behavior in this way: Altruism refers to prosocial behaviors that are carried out without expectation of obtaining external reward (concrete reward or social reward) or internal reward (self-reward). An example of altruism would be anonymously donating to charity.

== Perspectives ==
=== Kin selection theory ===
Kin selection theory explains altruism from an evolutionary perspective. Since natural selection screens out species without abilities to adapt to the challenging environment, preservation of good traits and superior genes are important for survival of future generations (i.e. inclusive fitness). Kin selection refers to an inheritable tendency to perform behaviors that may favor the chance of survival of people with a similar genetic base.

W. D. Hamilton proposed a mathematical expression for the kin selection:

rB>C

"where B is the benefit to the recipient, C is the cost to the altruist (both measured as the number of offspring gained or lost) and r is the coefficient of relationship (i.e. the probability that they share the same gene by descent)."

An experiment conducted in Britain supported kin selection. It is illustrated by the diagram below. The result showed that people were more willing to provide help to people with higher relatedness, something which occurs in both genders and in various cultures. The result also shows gender difference in kin selection: men are more affected by cues suggesting a similar genetic base than women.

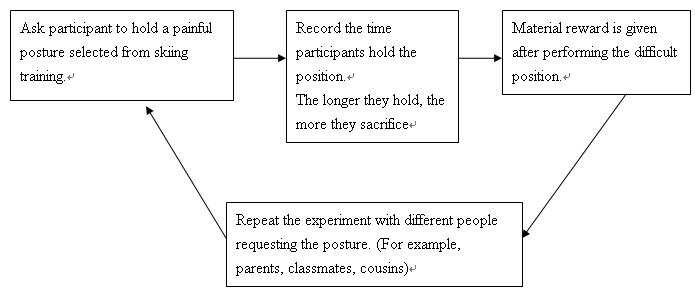

=== Reciprocal altruism ===
Reciprocal altruism is the idea that the incentive for an individual to help in the present is based on the expectation of receipt of help in the future. Robert Trivers believes it is advantageous for an organism to pay a cost for the benefit of another non-related organism if the favor is repaid (when the benefit of the sacrifice outweighs the cost).

As Peter Singer notes, "reciprocity is found amongst all social mammals with long memories who live in stable communities and recognize each other as individuals." Individuals should identify cheaters (those who do not reciprocate help) who lose the benefit of help from them in the future, as seen, for example, in blood-sharing by vampire bats.

Economic trade and business may be fostered by reciprocal altruism in which products given and received involve different exchanges. Economic trades follow the "I'll scratch your back if you scratch mine" principle. A pattern of frequent giving and receiving of help among workers boosts both productivity and social standing.

Reciprocal altruism

=== Negative-state relief model ===
The negative-state relief model of helping states that people help because of egoism. Egoistic motives lead a person to help others in bad circumstances in order to reduce personal distress experienced from knowing the situation of the people in need. Helping behavior happens only when the personal distress cannot be relieved by other actions. This model also explains people's avoidance behavior when they notice people in need: this is an alternative way for them to reduce their own distress.

==== Supporting studies ====
In one study, guilt feelings were induced in subjects by having them accidentally ruin a student's thesis data or by them seeing the data being ruined. Some subjects experienced positive events afterwards, e.g. being praised. Subjects who experienced negative guilt feelings were more motivated to help than those who had a neutral emotion. However, once the negative mood was relieved by receiving praise, subjects no longer had high motivation to help.

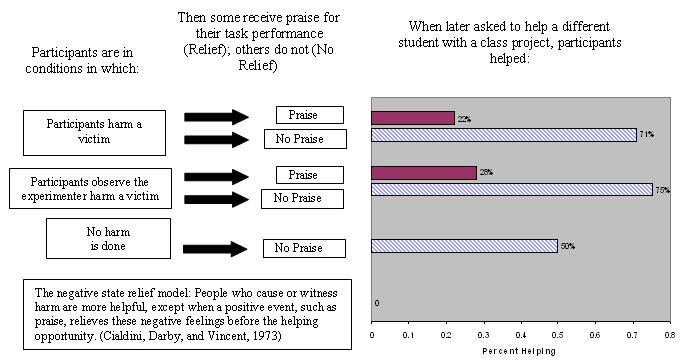

A second study found that people who anticipate positive events (in this case, listening to a comedy tape), show low helping motivation since they are expecting their negative emotions to be lifted up by the upcoming stimulation.

=== Empathy-altruism hypothesis ===
People may initiate helping behavior when they feel empathy for the person they are helping—when they can relate to that person and feel and understand what that person is experiencing.

Daniel Batson's Empathy-altruism hypothesis asserts that the decision of whether to help or not is primarily influenced by the presence of empathy towards the person in need, and secondarily by factors like the potential costs and rewards (social exchange concerns).

The hypothesis was supported by a study that divided participants into a high-empathy group and a low-empathy group. Both groups listened to Janet, a fellow student, sharing her feelings of loneliness. The results indicated that the high-empathy group (instructed to vividly imagine Janet's emotions) volunteered to spend more time with her, regardless of whether their help remained anonymous. This finding underscores the idea that empathetic individuals are more likely to provide assistance, without being primarily motivated by considerations of costs and rewards, thus lending support to the empathy-altruism hypothesis.

=== Responsibility — prosocial value orientation ===
A strong influence on helping is feeling responsible to help, especially when combined with the belief that one can help other people. The feeling of responsibility can result from a situation that focuses responsibility on a person, or it can be a personal characteristic (leading to helping when activated by others' need). Ervin Staub described a "prosocial value orientation" that makes helping more likely when noticing a person in physical distress or psychological distress. Prosocial orientation was also negatively related to aggression in boys, and positively related to "constructive patriotism". The components of this orientation are a positive view of human beings, concern about others' welfare, and a feeling of and belief in one's responsibility for others' welfare.

=== Social exchange theory ===
According to the social-exchange theory, people help because they want to gain goods from the one being helped. People estimate the rewards and costs of helping others, and aim at maximizing the former and minimizing the latter.

Rewards are incentives, which can be material goods, social rewards which can improve one's image and reputation (e.g. praise), or self-reward.

Rewards are either external or internal. External rewards are things that are obtained from others when helping them, for instance, friendship and gratitude. People are more likely to help those who are more attractive or important, whose approval is desired. Internal reward is generated by oneself when helping. This can be, for example, a sense of goodness and self-satisfaction. When seeing someone in distress, we may empathize with that person and thereby become aroused and distressed. We may choose to help in order to reduce this arousal and distress. According to this theory, before helping, people consciously calculate the benefits and costs of helping and not helping, and they help when the overall benefit to themselves of helping outweighs the cost.

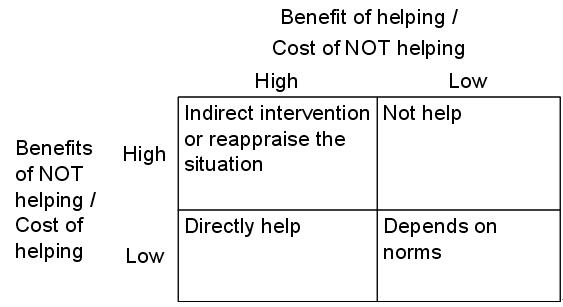

== Contemporary Experimental Research on Helping Behavior ==
While classic theories of helping behavior, such as kin selection, reciprocal altruism, and the empathy-altruism hypothesis, have long shaped our understanding, recent experimental research has provided new insights into the actual motivations and contexts for helping in real life. This section summarizes major findings from recent studies, highlighting how laboratory and cross-cultural experiments have clarified when, why, and for whom people help.

=== Empathy and Altruism ===
Can people help others purely out of kindness, or is there always some self-interest involved? Research led by Batson suggests that empathy, feeling what someone else is feeling, can lead to truly selfless helping. In one experiment, people who were told to imagine how a distressed person felt were more likely to help, even when they could easily leave the situation without anyone knowing. Later, another experiment showed that empathy-driven helping happens even when no one else is watching, which suggests it really is about caring for others, not just looking good.

=== Kin Selection ===
Evolutionary psychology suggests that people are especially likely to help relatives, since this increases the likelihood that shared genes will be passed on to future generations, a principle called kin selection. Demonstrating this, Madsen and colleagues studied helping across several cultures by asking participants to hold a squat (a physically challenging task) for as long as possible, with the longer they held it, the more money would be donated to a chosen relative like a sibling, cousin, aunt, or uncle. Across all cultures studied, people tried harder (i.e., held the squat longer) to help closer relatives, supporting the evolutionary prediction that people are predisposed to help kin.

=== Reciprocal Altruism ===
What about helping people who aren’t related to you? The theory of reciprocal altruism says we might help a non-family member if we think they’ll return the favor later like “you scratch my back, I’ll scratch yours”. This idea was first proposed by Robert Trivers and has been used to explain cooperation in many animal species, but it’s tricky to show it directly in humans. Most support for this idea comes from observations and theoretical models, not from direct experiments with people.

=== Egoism, Guilt, and Helping ===
Helping isn’t always selfless. Sometimes, people help because it makes them feel better about themselves, for example, to relieve guilt or avoid bad feelings. In one famous experiment, people who accidentally ruined someone’s work (and were made to feel guilty) were much more likely to help out, but if their mood was already fixed before they had member the chance to help, they didn’t offer as much. This suggests that feeling bad can push people to help, but not necessarily because they care about others.

=== Limitations and Future Research ===
Most of these experiments were done in labs with college students, mostly from Western countries. This raises questions, would we see the same patterns in real-life situations and in other cultures? Future research could look at more everyday examples and include people from all over the world to see if these theories hold up outside the lab.

== Implications ==
=== Cultural differences ===
A major cultural difference is between collectivism and individualism. Collectivists attend more to the needs and goals of the group they belong to, while individualists focus on themselves. This might suggest that collectivists would be more likely to help ingroup members, and would help strangers less frequently than would individualists.

=== Economic environment ===
Helping behavior is influenced by the economic environment. In general, frequency of helping behavior in a country is inversely related to the country's economic status.

=== Rural vs. urban area ===
A meta-analytical study found out that at either extreme, urban (300,000 people or more) or rural environments (5,000 people or less), are the worst places if someone is looking for help the worst places if someone is looking for help.

=== Choosing a role ===
Edgar Henry Schein describes three different roles people may follow when they respond to requests for help: The Expert Resource Role, The Doctor Role, The Process Consultant Role.

Expert Resource Role
This is the most common. It assumes that the person being helped is seeking information or expert service that they cannot provide for themselves. For example, simple issues like asking for directions or more complex issues like an organization hiring a financial consultant will fall into this category.

Doctor Role
This can be confused with the Expert Role because they seem to overlap each other. This role includes the client asking for information and service but also demands a diagnosis and prescription. Doctors, counselors, coaches, and repair personnel fulfill this kind of role. Contrary to the expert role, the Doctor Role shifts more power to the helper who is responsible for those duties: diagnosing, prescribing, and administering the cure.

Process Consultant Role
Here the helper focuses on the communication process from the very beginning. Before help can start, there needs to be an establishment of trust between the helper and the client. For example, in order for a tech consultant to be effective, he or she has to take a few minutes to discuss what the situation is, how often the problem occurs, what has been tried before, etc. before transitioning into the expert role or the doctor role.

== See also ==
- Altruism
- Collaboration
- Cooperation
- Eusociality
- Friendship
- Hero
- Humanitarian aid
- Prosocial behavior
- Reciprocal altruism
- Rescue
- Sharing
- Social animal
- Social psychology
- Social support
- Social value orientations
- Volunteering
- Defensive help
- Faz'ah
