= Faz'ah =

Faz'ah (Arabic: الفزعة) is a traditional Arab cultural practice that refers to a swift and voluntary response to help others in times of crisis, emergency, or need. Deeply rooted in Arab tribal and rural communities, Faz'ah reflects values of solidarity, bravery, and mutual aid.

== Description ==
Deeply rooted in Arab heritage, Faz'ah embodies ideals of bravery, honor, and protection of the group. It is often associated with tribal values and collective responsibility. Despite modern socio-economic changes, Faz'ah remains significant in many Arab communities today.

== Historical and Social Contexts ==
- Tribal emergencies: In historical contexts, Arab tribes would mobilize collectively in response to threats such as defensive wars or intertribal disputes.
- Social events: Faz'ah also occurs during weddings or harvest seasons, where community members come together to offer support—for instance, helping with olive picking.
- Rural communities: In villages, residents may spontaneously gather to help someone build a house, extinguish a fire, or rescue someone in danger.

== See also ==
- Agreeableness
- Collaboration
- Cooperation
- Tribe
- Morality
- Bedouin
- Emergency
- Helping behavior
