= John Turner (psychologist) =

British psychologist

John Charles Turner
- Born: 7 September 1947; London
- Died: 24 July 2011 (aged 63)
- Education: Sussex University, University of Bristol
- Known for: self-categorization theory
- Scientific career
- Fields: Social psychology
- Workplaces: University of Bristol, Macquarie University, Australia National University
- Thesis: Social categorization and social comparison in intergroup relations (1975)
- Doctoral advisor: Henri Tajfel
- Doctoral students: Michael Hogg, Stephen Reicher, Margaret Wetherell

John Charles Turner (7 September 1947 – 24 July 2011) was a British social psychologist who, along with colleagues, developed the self-categorization theory. Amongst other things, the theory states that the self is not a foundational aspect of cognition, but rather that the self is an outcome of cognitive processes and an interaction between the person and the social context. The self-categorization theory was developed as a companion theory to the social identity theory, and the two theories taken together are known as the social identity approach.

== Biographical ==
Turner was born in South London, where he lived with seven siblings and his parents in a small council flat. His father was a contractor and Turner would sometimes work with his father installing window frames. During the time it took Turner to get his undergraduate degree, he got a job at a printing factory. Working at the printing factory-made Turner more aware of the importance of groups in social change. He gained experience as a Trades Union Organizer and experienced the importance of groups in terms of achieving social change. Being in the group environment also taught Turner how power emerges from the cooperation of group members, which made him aware of the “extent to which attacks on group rationality and group decision making are coded rationales for dismantling the sole source of power available to the powerless.” Turner was not someone who fit in easily with his classmates and it could be from his difficulties fitting in and his experience at the printing factory that prompted the need to understand groups.

== Academic ==
Turner attended the Wilson School in Camberwell, where he won about 12 scholarships. He attended Sussex University and even though it took him six years (1965–1971), he received his undergraduate degree. Turner continued his education at the University of Bristol, and he got his Ph.D. under the supervision of Henri Tajfel. Tajfel is known for the social identity theory which goes hand in hand with self-categorization theory. During the 1970s, Turner was a lecturer in social psychology at the University of Bristol and during 1982 he was a scholar at the Institute for Advanced Study in Princeton. Turner continued his journey to Australia in 1983, “first to Macquarie University in Sydney and then as a professor at the Australia National University in Canberra in 1990 as a professor.” He later retired in 2008, after being a professor at the Australia National University and while teaching there he had accomplished many objectives.

Turner established a Laboratory of Experimental Social Psychology, which gave him the chance to publish books and articles with colleagues. In this space was where Turner and colleagues had established the conceptual and empirical foundation of self-categorization Theory. He was elected to give the Tajfel Lecture of the European Association of Social Psychology at Oxford, which is remembered as the “Prejudiced Personality and Social Change” (1999). From 2003 to 2007, he was also elected Fellow of the Australian Academy of Social Sciences and was then made a Professional Fellow of the Australian Research Council. John Turner has had an impact on social psychology, understanding groups, and the self.

== Contribution to psychology ==
Turner's theory is important to social psychology because it gives specific details on the power groups have and how it changes a person's identity. The theory provides an understanding that there is a difference between how an individual might identify themselves aside from the group and how they might identify themselves once they are with the group. It is like being an actor, depending on what play the person is in, determines their behavior. Depending on a person's environment identifies how they may behave. The most important aspect of the theory is that “social identity is what allows group behavior to occur at all.” Turner thought that the “self-system reflects the operation of a context-sensitive categorization process, in which people see themselves as either sharing category membership with others or not.” Turner's theory gives an insight into understanding “me vs. them” and “us vs. them”. It is a person's response to their personal life and their social life. This leads to the other important contribution of the theory is that it further explains shared social identity which Turner believed to be the basis for mutual social influence. The theory explains that when people have that mutual social influence it motivates them to want to “co-ordinate their behavior in ways that are relevant to that identity.” This is important because this is how people develop their views on the world and their thoughts, feelings, and actions.

== See also ==
- Henri Tajfel
