= Collective identity =

Shared sense of belonging to a group

Collective identity or group identity is a shared sense of belonging to a group. This concept appears within a few social science fields. National identity is a simple example, though myriad groups exist which share a sense of identity. Like many social concepts or phenomena, it is constructed, not empirically defined. Its discussion within these fields is often highly academic and relates to academia itself, its history beginning in the 19th century.

== In sociology ==
In 1989, Alberto Melucci published Nomads of the Present, which introduces his model of collective identity based on studies of the social movements of the 1980s. Melucci based his ideas on the writings by Touraine (1925-2023) and Pizzorno (1924-2019), specifically their ideas on social movements and collective action respectively.

Alberto Melucci writes: "collective identity is an interactive and shared definition produced by several individuals (or groups at a more complex level) and concerned with the orientation of action and the field of opportunities and constraints in which the action takes place". Unsatisfied with the gap between theories on how collective actions form and how individuals find motivation, Melucci defines an intermediate process, in which individuals recognize that they share certain orientations in common and on that basis decide to act together. He considers collective identity as a process that is negotiated over time with three parts: cognitive definition, active relationship, and emotional investments.

1. Cognitive Definition: the formulation of a cognitive framework concerning goals, means, and environment of action
2. Active Relationship: the activation of relationships among participants
3. Emotional Investments: emotional recognition between individuals

Melucci, in his writing "The Process of Collective Identity" argues for collective identity as a useful analytical tool to explain social movements. It addresses not only the processes within the system of the collective actor such as leadership models, ideologies, or communication methods, but also external relations with allies and competitors which all shape the collective actor. He goes on to state that it can help better understand the development of modern collective action, distinct from formal organizations, amidst the rapid development of the field of social science research. In addition, it makes collective groups as systematic collectives and not entities of ideology or defined simple value sets that could antagonize or glorify certain groups. For conflict analysis, this distinction can change the language and nature of analysis completely.

== In social psychology ==
Social psychologists had interest in concepts of identity and individuality since its early days, tracing as far back as the work of George Mead. His theories focused on the relationship between individual identity and society. He theorizes a chicken-and-egg relationship between society and identity. Preexisting social structure and conditions shape a person's identity, which in turn, interacts with others and shapes the new and emerging social structure.

More contemporarily, Polletta and Jasper defined collective identity as “an individual’s cognitive, moral, and emotional connections with a broader community, category, practice, or institution.” The collective identity of a group are often expressed through the group's cultures and traditions. The origin of the identity can be from within the group or outside the group, but ultimately, a collective identity is only formed upon the group members’ acceptance of the identity. Though defining collective identity to be a self-central concept, they emphasize on its distinction from concepts like ideology, motivation, and personal identity.

Not to be confused with social identity theory or self-categorization theory, collective identity focuses on the identity of the group as a whole, while the other theories focus on the identity of an individual's association with a group. to 2013. On contrast to traditional social psychologists, significant number of discursive researchers have shown that collective identity should be treated in research as something that we produce rather than what we are. Sue Widdicombe has demonstrated that people construct, accept, resist being cast as members of specific group through discourse. She showed that collective Identities are both ends as well as means to achieve further ends. Collective identity is an important subject within war. People construct and present themselves as members of specific group to make sense of their suffering as well as their positions in regard to armed conflicts. Demonizing and dehumanizing the other group is a prerequisite for justifying harming the people that belongs to it.

== In political science ==
Marxist concepts of class consciousness can be considered a root of one form of political collective identity. The identity of the class was tied to its values and interests, and includes solidarity. This idea of solidarity is shared by Émile Durkheim, who argues that collective identity helps create bonds between individuals through shared morals and goals. Max Weber, in his book "Economy and Society", published posthumously in 1922, critiqued Marx's focus on production and instead suggests that class, status, and party form the three sources of collective identity.

Alexander Wendt is well known for his writings on constructivist political theory, in which collective identity play a prominent role as identity is a major determining factor in the role of states in the international order. His approach focuses on group and individual identity, at the domestic and international level. This application of collective identity to explaining and describing the international system is the basis of constructivism. Constructivism has a strong focus on the social discourse that create these identities, which not only designate a country as a collective actor but possible alliances as collective groups. By grouping together countries, either by their own decision or by third parties, new alliances or blocs form through the collective identity assigned to them, even if sometimes this assignment is based on inaccurate binary groupings. Regardless of accuracy of grouping, the very act of grouping these countries together affects how the international system views them and thus treats them, which in return causes the countries to identify with each other in terms of their common position internationally. Further work on collective identity in international relations has been conducted by Richard Ned Lebow, who has argued that states view themselves and others as parts of collective power groups of states, such as rising and falling powers, and simply their sense of belonging to certain power groups or aspiring to be in others affects their interactions with other states, irrespective of the "reality" of their power statuses. That is the case, very often.

== Evolutionary function ==
Joseph Jordania suggested that in human evolutionary history collective identity was crucial for the physical survival of hominids and early humans. As individual hominids were too weak and slow to survive predators on their own, in the moments most critical to survival (predator attacks, combat situations, mortal danger) humans enter the altered state of consciousness where they do not feel fear and pain, do not question the behavior of other members of their group, and are ready to sacrifice their lives for evolution's more important super-ordinate goals (i.e. survival of the children or the group). Humans sometimes do not have memory of these critical moments. Absence of stressful memories is known as psychogenic amnesia. According to Jordania, human ability to follow the rhythm in big groups, to sing together in harmony, to dance for many hours and enter the ecstatic state, as well as the tradition of body painting, were all the parts of the first universal rituals. These were primarily developed as the means to synchronize each individual group-member's neural activity (through the release of neuro-chemicals), in order to reach the state of collective identity, also known as transcendence. In this state the survival needs of the group can override the instincts of individual survival.

== See also ==
- Collective consciousness
- National identity
- Place identity
- Race / racial group
- Ethnicity / ethnic group
- Social group
- Supporters' group (Sport)
