= Social identity approach =

Two intertwined, but distinct, social psychological theories

Figure 1. The explanatory profiles of social identity and self-categorization theories.

"Social identity approach" is an umbrella term designed to show that there are two methods used by academics to describe certain complex social phenomena—namely the dynamics between groups and individuals. Those two theoretical methods are called social identity theory and self-categorization theory. Experts describe them as two intertwined, but distinct, social psychological theories. The term "social identity approach" arose as an attempt to militate against the tendency to conflate the two theories, as well as the tendency to mistakenly believe one theory to be a component of the other. These theories should be thought of as overlapping. While there are similarities, self categorisation theory has greater explanatory scope (i.e. is less focused on intergroup relationships specifically) and has been investigated in a broader range of empirical conditions. Self-categorization theory can also be thought of as developed to address limitations of social identity theory. Specifically the limited manner in which social identity theory deals with the cognitive processes that underpin the behaviour it describes. Although this term may be useful when contrasting broad social psychological movements, when applying either theory it is thought of as beneficial to distinguish carefully between the two theories in such a way that their specific characteristics can be retained.

The social identity approach has been applied to a wide variety of fields and continues to be very influential. There is a high citation rate for key social identity papers and that rate continues to increase.

== Implications ==
=== Social groups ===
The social identity approach has been contrasted with the social cohesion approach when it comes to defining social groups. The social identity approach describes the state of people thinking of themselves and others as a group. Therefore, three intra-psychological processes proceed. Firstly, social categorization (see self-categorization theory) means that people organize social information by categorizing people into groups. Secondly, social comparison (see social comparison theory) means that people give a meaning to those categories in order to understand the task of the group in the specific situation. Thirdly, social identification is the process in which people relate the self to one of those categories.

Regarding the relation between collective identification and work motivation, several propositions have been made regarding situational influences, the acceptance of the leader and the self-definition of a collective. As a situational influence, research says that individuals are activated by situations that challenge their inclusion to the group. The acceptance of the leader is another proposition. The so-called ingroup-favoring-bias (see in-group favoritism) means that if the team leader is interpreted as an ingroup member, the other team members will attribute his or her good behavior internally while they will attribute bad behavior externally. For self-definition of a collective the value of the group as well as the belief in current and future success is important. Closely linked to self-definition to a collective, cohesion is another construct that has an impact on the development of group motivation and in a broader sense also to the group performance.

On the topic of social groups, some social psychologists draw a distinction between different types of group phenomenon. Specifically, "those that derive from interpersonal relationships and interdependence with specific others and those that derive from membership in larger, more impersonal collectives or social categories". The social identity approach however does not anticipate this distinction. Instead it anticipates that the same psychological processes underlie intergroup and intragroup phenomenon involving both small and large groups. Relatedly, the persistent perception that the social identity approach is only relevant to large group phenomenon has led some social identity theorists to specifically reassert (both theoretically and empirically) the relevance of the social identity approach to small group interactions.

== Applications ==
=== Leadership ===
According to the social identity approach, leadership is a function of the group instead of the individual. Individuals who are leaders in their groups tend to be closer to the prototypical group member than are followers. Additionally, they tend to be more socially attractive, which makes it easier for group members to accept their authority and comply with their decisions. Finally, leaders tend to be viewed by others as the leader. In this final distinction, group members attribute leadership traits to the person and not the situation, furthering the distinction between the leader and others in the group by viewing him or her as special. Consistent with this view of leadership, researchers have found that individuals can manipulate their own leadership status in groups by portraying themselves as prototypical to the group.

=== Economics ===
Social identity concepts have been applied to economics resulting in what is now known as identity economics. For example, two separate papers and a book by Akerlof and Kranton incorporate social identity as a factor in the principal–agent model. The main conclusion is that when agents consider themselves insiders, they will maximize their identity utility by exerting greater effort compared to the prescription behavior. On the other hand, if they consider themselves outsiders, they will require a higher wage to compensate their loss for behavior difference with prescribed behaviors.

== Related theoretical work ==
=== Social identity model of deindividuation effects ===
The social identity model of deindividuation effects (SIDE) was developed from further research on the social identity theory and the self-categorization theory, further specifying the effects of situational factors on the functioning of processes proposed by the two theories. The SIDE model uses this framework to explain cognitive effects of visibility and anonymity in intra-group and inter-group contexts. The model is based on the idea that the self-concept is flexible and different in different situations or contexts. The theory consists of a range of different self-categories that define people as unique individuals or in terms of their membership to specific social groups and other, broader social categories based on the context of the situation. The SIDE model proposes that anonymity shifts both the focus of self-awareness from the individual self to the group self and the perceptions of others from being mostly interpersonal to being group-based (stereotyping).

Research has suggested that visual anonymity not only increases negative behavior towards others, but can also promote positive social relations. In one study, all volunteers participated individually in group discussion based on three different topics. In the visually anonymous condition, all communications between participants were text-based while in the visually identifiable condition, the communication was also supplemented by two-way video cameras. The study resulted in the findings that showed anonymity significantly increased group attraction.

=== Intergroup emotion theory ===
Intergroup emotion theory further expands on the concept of personally significant group memberships as posed by social identity and self-categorization theories. This theory is primarily based on the concept of depersonalization and the interchangeability of the self with other ingroup members. This causes cognitive representations of the self and the group to become inevitably connected, and therefore the group obtains an emotional significance. This means that individuals not only categorize themselves as members of the ingroup but also "react emotionally when situations or events affect the ingroup". For example, people often report that their group is being discriminated against, even though they feel that they personally are not subject to that discrimination.

== Controversies ==
=== Social identity vs. interdependence ===
Some researchers have claimed that the majority of results in research using the minimal group paradigm can be derived from self-interest and interdependence and that this poses a serious problem for social identity theory and self-categorization theory, and in particular self-categorization theory's account of social groups. Social identity researchers have responded by suggesting that the interdependence centric analysis that has been proposed as an alternative is inconsistent and still relies heavily on the social categorization processes detailed in self-categorization theory. Moreover, they argue that researchers making the above criticisms have also significantly misinterpreted the role of sociological categories in the two theories.
