= Henri Tajfel =

Polish-born British psychologist (1919–1982)

- Born: Hersz Mordche Tajfel; 22 June 1919; Włocławek, Poland
- Died: 3 May 1982 (aged 62); Oxford, England
- Scientific career
- Fields: Prejudice, social identity

Henri Tajfel (born Hersz Mordche Tajfel; 22 June 1919 – 3 May 1982) was a Polish social psychologist, best known for his pioneering work on the cognitive aspects of prejudice and social identity theory, as well as being one of the founders of the European Association of Experimental Social Psychology.

== Biography ==
=== Early life in Poland ===
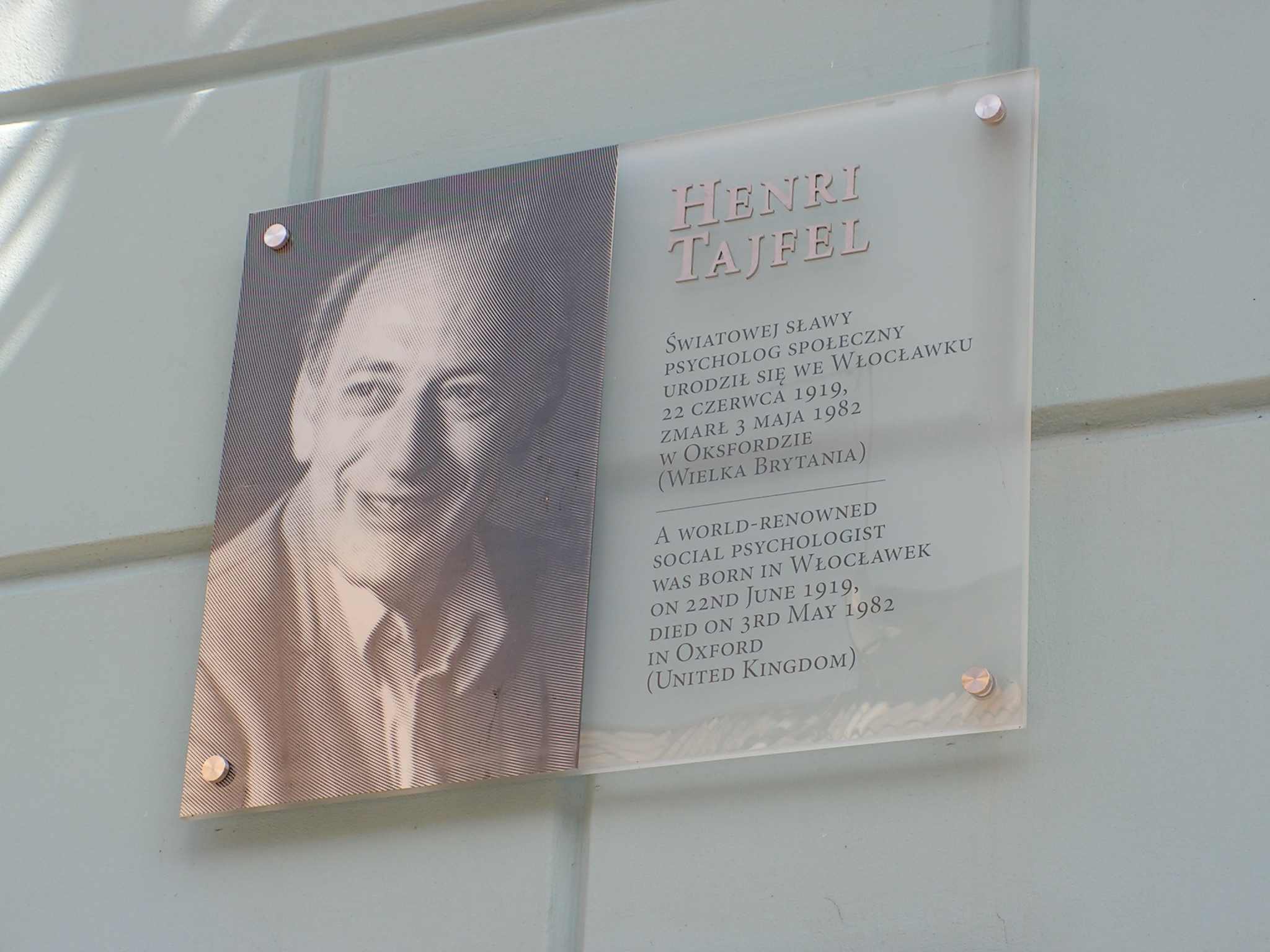
Plaque on the building in his native city Włocławek

Tajfel grew up in Poland. Because of Polish numerus clausus restrictions on Jews in university education, he left Poland to study chemistry at the Sorbonne in France. At the outbreak of World War II, he volunteered to serve in the French army. A year later, he was taken prisoner-of-war by the Germans. He faced a dilemma: whether or not to admit to the Germans that he was a Polish Jew. He claimed to be a French citizen but did not deny his Jewish identity. He reasoned that if he denied being Jewish and if the Germans found out later that he was Jewish, he would certainly have been killed. In the event, Tajfel survived the war in a series of prisoner-of-war camps.

On his return home he discovered that none of his immediate family, and few of his friends, had survived the Nazi Holocaust. He was to write later about the profound effect that this had on him and how it led to his later work on the psychology of prejudice and intergroup relations.

After the war Tajfel worked for a series of relief organisations including the Œuvre de secours aux enfants (OSE), a Jewish humanitarian organisation. Tajfel's work with OSE involved resettling Jewish children, many of whom were orphans who had lost all their family. Tajfel would often say that his work with OSE was the most important achievement in his life and he kept in touch with many of the children whose lives he helped to rebuild. He also worked for the United Nations International Refugee Organization.

=== Move to Britain ===
He was granted French citizenship in 1946. However, he was soon to meet his future wife Anna-Sophie Eber (Ann), who had been born in Germany but had moved to Britain before the Second World War. Henri and Ann set up home in Britain where their two sons, Michael and Paul, were born. Henri took on British citizenship (for details, see the biography in the Oxford Dictionary of National Biography).

In 1951 Tajfel began studying psychology at Birkbeck College, University of London. He won a competitive scholarship for mature students with an essay on the subject of prejudice. In 1954 he graduated and worked as a lecturer, first at the University of Durham and then at Oxford. In 1962 he was made a Founding Fellow of Linacre College, Oxford. In his research work at the University of Oxford, Tajfel examined several different areas of social psychology, including social judgement, nationalism, and, most importantly, the cognitive aspects of prejudice.

In 1967 he was made Chair of Social Psychology at the University of Bristol. At Bristol he conducted research into intergroup relations and was active in making Bristol University a European centre for social psychology. He retired from Bristol and moved back to Oxford shortly before his death from cancer in 1982.

== Work in social psychology ==
=== Early research ===
Tajfel's early research at University of Durham and University of Oxford involved examining the processes of social judgement. He believed that the cognitive processes of categorization contributed strongly to the psychological dimensions of prejudice, which went against the prevailing views of the time. Many psychologists assumed that extreme prejudice was the result of personality factors, such as authoritarianism. According to this perspective, only those with personalities that predisposed them to prejudice were likely to become bigots. Tajfel believed this was mistaken. He had seen how large numbers of Germans—not just those with particular personalities—had given their support to Nazism and had held extreme views about Jews. Nazism would not have been successful without the support of "ordinary" Germans. Tajfel sought to discover whether the roots of prejudice might be found in "ordinary" processes of thinking, rather than in "extraordinary" personality types.

He conducted a series of experiments, investigating the role of categorization. One of his most notable experiments looked at the way that people judged the length of lines. He found that the imposition of a category directly affected judgements. If the lines, which were presented individually, were shown without any category label, then errors of judgement tended to be random. If the longest lines were each labelled A, and the shortest were labelled B, then the errors followed a pattern. Perceivers would tend to judge the lines of each category (whether A or B) as being more similar to each other than they were; and perceivers would judge the differences between categories as greater than they were (i.e., the differences between the longest B line and the shortest 'A' line). These findings have continued to influence subsequent work on categorization and have been replicated subsequently.

Tajfel viewed these investigations into social judgement as being directly related to the issue of prejudice. Imposing category distinctions on lines (A and B) was like dividing the social world into different groups of people (e.g., French, Germans, British). The results of his experiments showed how cognitively deep-seated it was for perceivers to assume that all members of a certain nationality-based category (for instance, all the French or all the British) were more similar to each other than they actually were, and to assume that the members of different categories differed more than they did (for instance, to exaggerate the differences between the French and the British). In this respect, the judging of lines was similar to making stereotyped judgements about social groups. Tajfel also argued that if the categories were of value to the perceiver, then these processes of exaggeration were likely to be enhanced.

The implications of this position were profound. It meant that some of the basic psychological roots of prejudice lay not in particular personality types, but in general, "ordinary" processes of thinking, especially processes of categorising. Tajfel outlined these ideas in his article, "Cognitive Aspects of Prejudice", which was first published in 1969 and has been republished subsequently. For this article, Tajfel was awarded the first annual Gordon Allport Intergroup Relations Prize by the Society for the Psychological Study of Social Issues.

=== Intergroup relations ===
Having moved to Bristol University, Tajfel began his work on intergroup relations and conducted the renowned minimal groups experiments. In these studies, test subjects were divided arbitrarily into two groups, based on a trivial and almost completely irrelevant basis such as preference for the abstract paintings of Klee or Kandinsky. Participants did not know other members of the group, did not even know who they were, and had no reason to expect that they would interact with them in the future. Still, members of both groups allocated resources in such a way that showed favouritism for members of their own group in a way that maximized their own group's outcomes in comparison to the alternate group, even at the expense of maximum gains for their own group. Even "on the basis of a coin toss...simple categorization into groups seems to be sufficient reason for people to dispense valued rewards in ways that favor in-group members over those who are 'different'".

==== Social identity theory ====
Subsequently, Tajfel and his student John Turner developed the theory of social identity. They proposed that people have an inbuilt tendency to categorize themselves into one or more "ingroups", building a part of their identity on the basis of membership of that group and enforcing boundaries with other groups.

Social identity theory suggests that people identify with groups in such a way as to maximize positive distinctiveness. Groups offer both identity (they tell us who we are) and self-esteem (they make us feel good about ourselves). The theory of social identity has had a very substantial impact on many areas of social psychology, including group dynamics, intergroup relations, prejudice and stereotyping, and organizational psychology.

=== Tajfel's influence ===
Henri Tajfel's influence on social psychology, especially in Britain and Europe, continues to be significant. His influence has reached beyond his particular views on social identity and social judgement, as he had a wide vision of creating a social psychology that was genuinely social and was engaged with broader issues. Too much social psychology was, in his view, trivial and based on what he called "experiments in a vacuum". Tajfel thought that social psychologists should seek to address serious social problems by examining how psychological dimensions interact with historical, ideological, and cultural factors.

The influence of his general vision can be seen in the book Social Groups and Identities. This book was a posthumous tribute to Tajfel, containing chapters written by many of his former students. Some of his students went on to develop his theories of social identity and some continued his early work on social judgement. There were also chapters from former students who developed very different sorts of social psychology. However, both those who continued Tajfel's work directly and those who moved in other directions were united in paying tribute to the force of Tajfel's vision for a broad-based, politically important social psychology.

== Sexual harassment ==
In 2019, evidence emerged documenting that Tajfel displayed inappropriate conduct toward female members of his lab. Tajfel regularly directed unwanted sexual attention to female colleagues. In his own research, he was uninterested in applying social identity theory to gender. As a consequence, the prestigious Tajfel Award will be renamed by the European Society for Social Psychology.

== See also ==
- Gordon Allport
- Michael Billig
- Collective narcissism
- Cultural identity
- Ingroups and outgroups
- Minimal group paradigm
- Moral exclusion

== Bibliography ==
- Tajfel, H. (1959). Quantitative judgment in social perception. British Journal of Psychology, 50, 16–29.
- Tajfel, H. (1969). Cognitive aspects of prejudice. Journal of Social Issues, 25, 79–97.
- Tajfel, H. (1970). Experiments in intergroup discrimination. Scientific American, 223, 96-102 (abstract).
- Tajfel, H., Billig, M., Bundy, R. P. & Flament, C. (1971). Social categorization and intergroup behaviour. European Journal of Social Psychology, Vol. 1, Issue 2, 149-178 (abstract).
- Tajfel, H. (1972). La catégorisation sociale. In S. Moscovici (Ed.), Introduction à la psychologie sociale (Vol. 1). Paris: Larousse.
- Tajfel, H. (1974). Social identity and intergroup behaviour. Social Science Information, 13, 65–93.
- Tajfel, H. (Ed.). (1978). Differentiation between social groups: Studies in the social psychology of intergroup relations. London: Academic Press.
- Tajfel, H. & Turner, J. C. (1979). An Integrative Theory of Intergroup Conflict. In W. G. Austin & S. Worchel (Eds.), The Social Psychology of Intergroup Relations. Monterey, CA: Brooks-Cole .
- Tajfel, H. (1981). Human Groups and Social Categories. Cambridge University Press, Cambridge.
- Tajfel, H. (1982). Social psychology of intergroup relations. Annual Review of Psychology, 33, 1-39.
- Tajfel, H. & Turner, J. C. (1986). The social identity theory of inter-group behavior. In S. Worchel & W. G. Austin (Eds.), Psychology of Intergroup Relations. Chicago: Nelson-Hall
