= Minimal group paradigm =

In-group favoritism is easily prompted

The minimal group paradigm is a method employed in social psychology. Although it may be used for a variety of purposes, it is best known as a method for investigating the minimal conditions required for discrimination to occur between groups. Experiments using this approach have revealed that even arbitrary distinctions between groups, such as preferences for certain paintings, or the color of their shirts, can trigger a tendency to favor one's own group at the expense of others, even when it means sacrificing in-group gain.

== Methodology ==
Although there are some variations, the traditional minimal group study consists of two phases. In the first phase, participants are randomly and anonymously divided into two groups (e.g., "Group A" and "Group B"), ostensibly on the basis of trivial criteria (e.g., preference for paintings or the toss of a coin). Sometimes, these participants are strangers to one another. In the second phase, participants take part in an ostensibly unrelated resource distribution task. During this task, participants distribute a valuable resource (e.g., money or points) between other participants who are only identified by code number and group membership (e.g., "participant number 34 of Group A"). Participants are told that, after the task is finished, they will receive the total amount of the resource that has been allocated to them by the other participants.

The main purpose of the procedures in the minimal group paradigm is to exclude "objective" influences from the situation. In the context of in-group favoritism, the anonymity of participants' personal identities excludes the influence of interpersonal favoritism. The omission of the self as a recipient in the resource distribution task excludes the influence of direct personal self-interest. The absence of any link between total in-group gain and individual gain excludes the influence of realistic competition. Finally, the absence of intergroup status hierarchies, together with the triviality and minimal social content of the groups, excludes the influence of normative or consensual discrimination.

Minimal group experiments tend to find that, although participants show a significant degree of fairness in their allocations, they also show a significant tendency to allocate more money or points to in-group members than to out-group members. Importantly, this strategy of maximizing relative in-group gain (maximum differentiation) occurs even when it means sacrificing absolute in-group gain ("Vladimir's choice").

== Development ==
Henri Tajfel and colleagues originally developed the minimal group paradigm in the early 1970s as part of their attempt to understand the psychological basis of intergroup discrimination. Tajfel's intention was to create groups with as little meaning as possible and then add meaning to discover at what point discrimination would occur. The surprising finding was that, even in the most minimal group conditions, responses favoring the in-group occurred. Although Tajfel and colleagues originally explained minimal group discrimination in terms of a generic norm for social competition that exists across societies, this explanation was later thought to be "uninteresting" and not offering any real explanatory or predictive power. Tajfel instead developed social identity theory's motivational explanation. In social identity theory, people are thought to award more points to their own group than to the out-group in the minimal group paradigm because, in those circumstances, in-group favoritism is the only way in which to achieve positive distinctiveness.

== Further uses ==
Researchers have recently applied the minimal group methodology to study prejudice against migrants. They created two hypothetical groups, 'Group A' and 'Group B', with random assignments. Members were all fictional, sharing no distinguishing characteristics. Some members were randomly chosen to switch groups, labeled as migrants. Participants rated each member on a seven-point Likert scale for favorability, with migrants receiving significantly lower ratings. This bias is partially attributed to migrants' exclusion from their original groups and the increased cognitive effort needed to categorize them.

Additionally, the minimal group paradigm explored the out-group homogeneity. Participants were split into two groups, each assigned two positive and two negative traits. They rated their own group and estimated ratings for the opposite group, including the traits' minimum and maximum scores. Results showed that participants rated their own group more favorably on positive traits and less so on negative traits. They also perceived more variability in their own group's negative traits and in the out-group's positive traits, leading to a perception of their own group as both more positive and more diverse compared to the out-group.

== See also ==
- Amity-enmity complex
- Discrimination
- Group conflict
- Intergroup relations
- No-win situation
- Realistic conflict theory
- The Scorpion and the Frog
- Bogardus social distance scale
