= Social identity theory =

Concept in social psychology

Social identity is the portion of an individual's self-concept derived from perceived membership in a relevant social group. As originally formulated by social psychologists Henri Tajfel and John Turner in the 1970s and the 1980s, social identity theory introduced the concept of a social identity as a way in which to explain intergroup behaviour. "Social identity theory explores the phenomenon of the 'ingroup' and 'outgroup', and is based on the view that identities are constituted through a process of difference defined in a relative or flexible way depends on the activities in which one engages."

This theory is described as a theory that predicts certain intergroup behaviours on the basis of perceived group status differences, the perceived legitimacy and stability of those status differences, and the perceived ability to move from one group to another. This contrasts with occasions where the term "social identity theory" is used to refer to general theorizing about human social selves. Moreover, and although some researchers have treated it as such, social identity theory was never intended to be a general theory of social categorization. It was awareness of the limited scope of social identity theory that led John Turner and colleagues to develop a cousin theory in the form of self-categorization theory, which built on the insights of social identity theory to produce a more general account of self and group processes.

The term social identity approach, or social identity perspective, is suggested for describing the joint contributions of both social identity theory and self-categorization theory. Social identity theory suggests that an organization can change individual behaviours if it can modify their self-identity or part of their self-concept that derives from the knowledge of, and emotional attachment to the group.

== Development ==
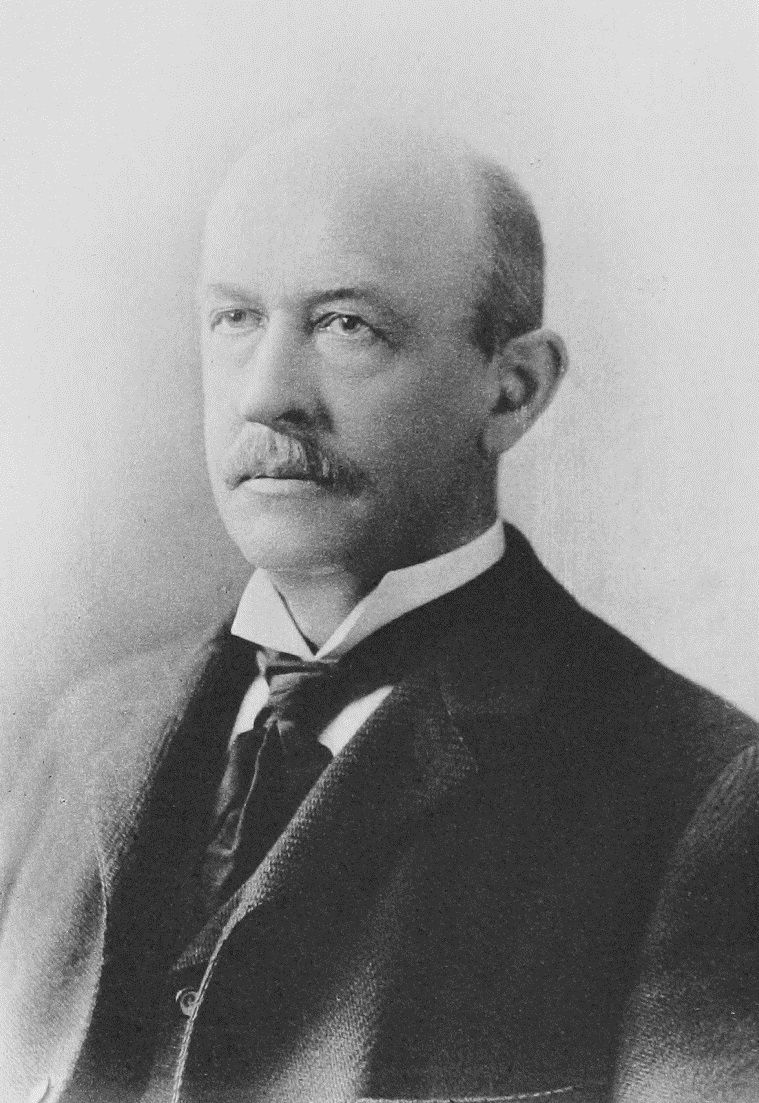
Social scientist William Graham Sumner

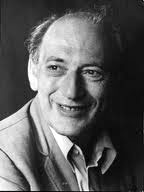
Social psychologist Henri Tajfel

=== Historical background ===
The term social identity theory achieved academic purchase only in the late 1970s, but the basic underlying concepts associated with it had emerged by the early twentieth century. William G. Sumner, writing in 1906, captures the primary dynamics in this excerpt from his influential work Folkways: A Study of the Sociological Importance of Usages, Manners, Customs, Mores, and Morals:

"Loyalty to the group, sacrifice for it, hatred and contempt for outsiders, brotherhood within, warlikeness without,—all grow together, common products of the same situation. ... Men of an others-group are outsiders with whose ancestors the ancestors of the we-group waged war. ... Each group nourishes its own pride and vanity, boasts itself superior, exalts its own divinities, and looks with contempt on outsiders. Each group thinks its own folkways the only right ones, and if it observes that other groups have other folkways, these excite its scorn."

By the late 1920s the collectivist perspective had all but disappeared from mainstream social psychology. Over fifty years later, around the time of the first formal use of the term 'social identity theory', Tajfel wrote this on the state of social psychology:

"Thus, social categorization is still conceived as a haphazardly floating 'independent variable' which strikes at random as the spirit moves it. No links are made or attempted, between the conditions determining its presence and mode of operation, and its outcomes in widely diffused commonalities of social behaviour. Why, when and how is social categorisation salient or not salient? What kind of shared constructions of social reality, mediated through social categorization, lead to a social climate in which large masses of people feel they are in long-term conflict with other masses? What, for example, are the psychological transitions from a stable to an unstable social system?" (Original emphasis, p. 188)

Thus, social identity theory in part reflects a desire to reestablish a more collectivist approach to social psychology of the self and social groups.

== Aspects ==
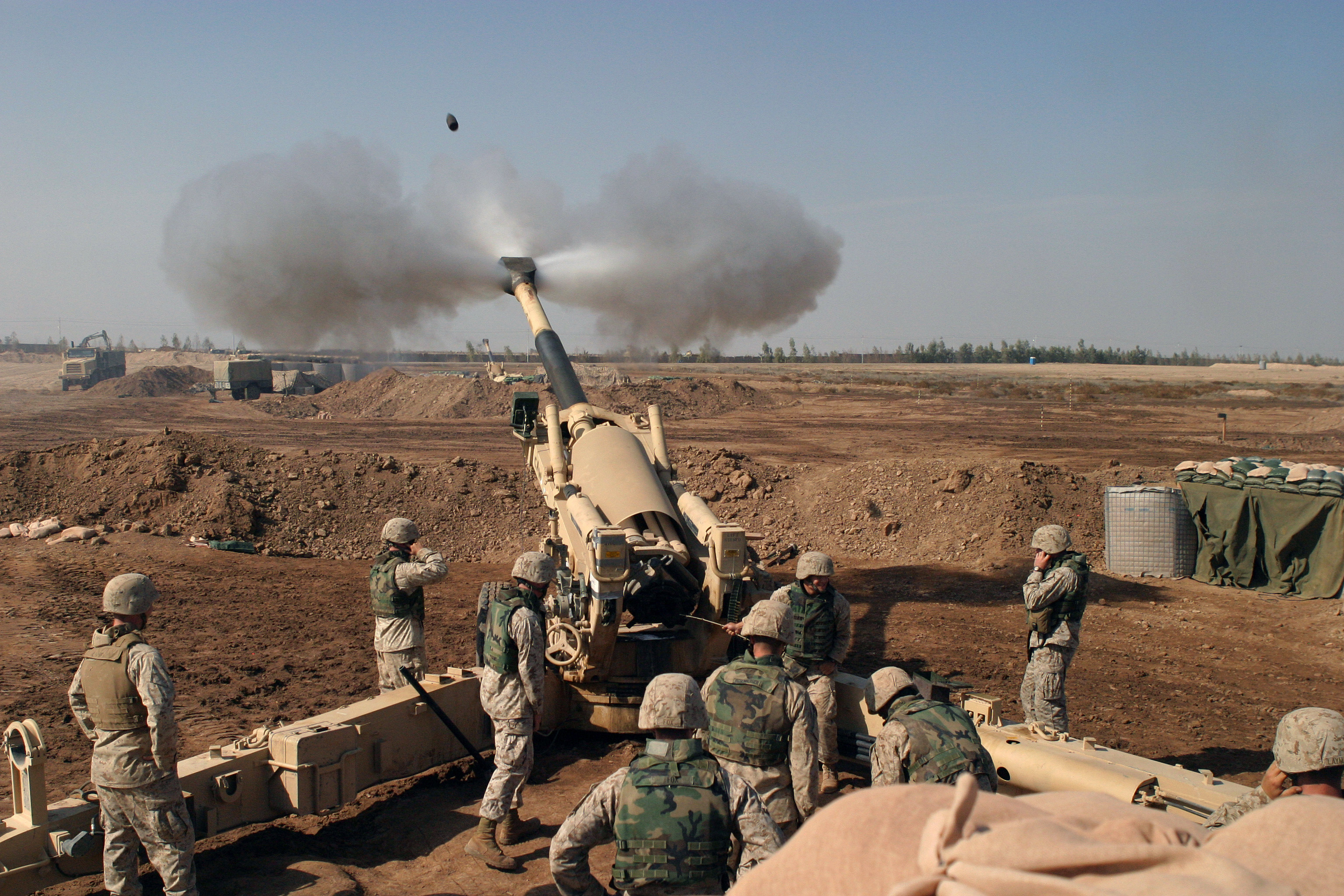
Henri Tajfel suggests that soldiers of opposing armies, fighting outside of view, is an illustrative example of behaviour at the extreme intergroup end of the intergroup–interpersonal continuum (shown: U.S. Marines in Fallujah, 2004).

=== The interpersonal-intergroup continuum ===
Social identity theory states that social behaviour will want a person to change their behaviour while in a group. It varies along a continuum between interpersonal behaviour and intergroup behaviour. Completely interpersonal behaviour would be behaviour determined solely by the individual characteristics and interpersonal relationships that exists between only two people. Completely intergroup behaviour would be behaviour determined solely by the social category memberships that apply to more than two people. The authors of social identity theory state that purely interpersonal or purely intergroup behaviour is unlikely to be found in realistic social situations. Rather, behaviour is expected to be driven by a compromise between the two extremes. The cognitive nature of personal vs. social identities, and the relationship between them, is more fully developed in self-categorization theory. Social identity theory instead focuses on the social structural factors that will predict which end of the spectrum will most influence an individual's behaviour, along with the forms that the behaviour may take.

=== Positive distinctiveness ===
A key assumption in social identity theory is that individuals are intrinsically motivated to achieve positive distinctiveness. That is, individuals "strive for a positive self-concept". As individuals to varying degrees may be defined and informed by their respective social identities (as per the interpersonal-intergroup continuum) it is further derived in social identity theory that "individuals strive to achieve or to maintain positive social identity". The precise nature of this striving for positive self-concept is a matter of debate (see the self-esteem hypothesis). Both the interpersonal-intergroup continuum and the assumption of positive distinctiveness motivation arose as outcomes of the findings of minimal group studies. In particular, it was found that under certain conditions individuals would endorse resource distributions that would maximize the positive distinctiveness of an in-group in contrast to an out-group at the expense of personal self-interest. Social identity matters because it shapes people's self-perceptions and interpersonal relationships. Favorable self-perception increases the likelihood that an individual would relate well to other members of the group and experience favorable feelings about themselves. People's perceptions of themselves are shaped by the group they identify with more strongly. Getting status within the group can make people feel more confident, content, and respected since belonging to that group becomes significant for how they view themselves and their talents.

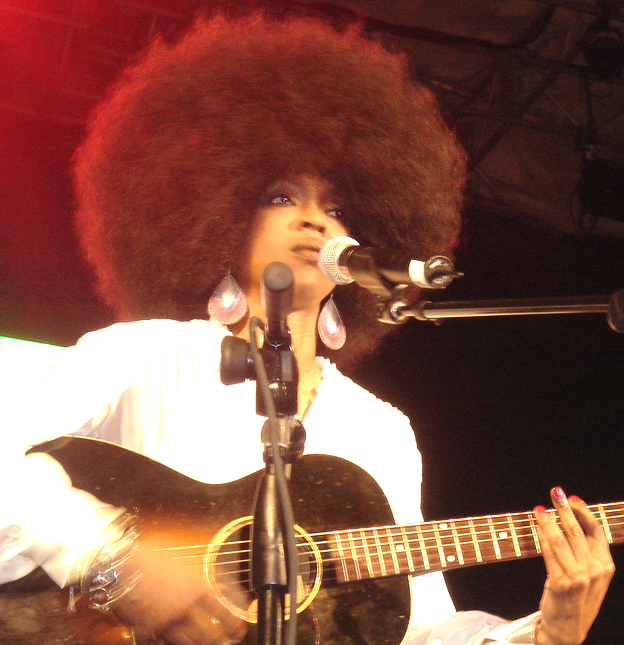
The "black is beautiful" movement and the associated African American embrace of African hairdos (like afros), culture, traditions, and music was provided by Tajfel and colleagues as an example of the cognitive creativity of low-status groups in the face of stable intergroup relations (shown: Lauryn Hill, 2005).

=== Positive distinctiveness strategies ===
Building on the above components, social identity theory details a variety of strategies that may be invoked in order to achieve positive distinctiveness. The individual's choice of behaviour is posited to be dictated largely by the perceived intergroup relationship. In particular the choice of strategy is an outcome of the perceived permeability of group boundaries (e.g., whether a group member may pass from a low status group into a high status group), as well as the perceived stability and legitimacy of the intergroup status hierarchy. The self-enhancing strategies detailed in social identity theory are detailed below. Importantly, although these are viewed from the perspective of a low status group member, comparable behaviours may also be adopted by high status group members.

==== Individual mobility ====
It is predicted that under conditions where the group boundaries are considered permeable individuals are more likely to engage in individual mobility strategies. That is, individuals "disassociate from the group and pursue individual goals designed to improve their personal lot rather than that of their ingroup".

==== Social creativity ====
Where group boundaries are considered impermeable, and where status relations are considered reasonably stable, individuals are predicted to engage in social creativity behaviours. Here, low-status ingroup members are still able to increase their positive distinctiveness without necessarily changing the objective resources of the ingroup or the outgroup. This may be achieved by comparing the ingroup to the outgroup on some new dimension, changing the values assigned to the attributes of the group, and choosing an alternative outgroup by which to compare the ingroup.

==== Social competition ====
Here an ingroup seeks positive distinctiveness and requires positive differentiation via direct competition with the outgroup in the form of ingroup favoritism. It is considered competitive in that in this case favoritism for the ingroup occurs on a value dimension that is shared by all relevant social groups (in contrast to social creativity scenarios). Social competition is predicted to occur when group boundaries are considered impermeable, and when status relations are considered to be reasonably unstable. Although not privileged in the theory, it is this positive distinctiveness strategy that has received the greatest amount of attention.

==== Political psychology ====
In political science, social identity theory has been incorporated as the subconsitituency politics theory of representation. This theory holds that political elites are individually rational, and they use identity instrumentally to cultivate minimum winning constituencies (e.g., via the "microtargeting" of ads). An example of microtargeting is Russian use of social media advertising alleged to have influenced the United States 2016 presidential election. Separately, a recent Science Advances article validates a computational model of in-group favoritism and political economy developed by Princeton political scientist Nolan McCarty using public opinion polling data.

== Implications ==
=== Ingroup favoritism ===
In-group favoritism (also known as "ingroup bias", despite Turner's objections to the term) is an effect where people give preferential treatment to others when they are perceived to be in the same ingroup. Social identity attributes the cause of ingroup favoritism to a psychological need for positive distinctiveness and describes the situations where ingroup favoritism is likely to occur (as a function of perceived group status, legitimacy, stability, and permeability). It has been shown via the minimal group studies that ingroup favoritism may occur for both arbitrary ingroups (e.g. a coin toss may split participants into a 'heads' group and a 'tails' group) as well as non-arbitrary ingroups (e.g. ingroups based on cultures, genders, sexual orientation, and first languages).

Continued study into the relationship between social categorization and ingroup favoritism has explored the relative prevalences of the ingroup favoritism vs. outgroup discrimination, explored different manifestations of ingroup favoritism, and has explored the relationship between ingroup favoritism and other psychological constraints (e.g., existential threat).

System justification theory was originally proposed by John Jost and Mahzarin Banaji in 1994 to build on social identity theory and to understand important deviations from ingroup favoritism, such as outgroup favoritism on the part of members of disadvantaged groups (Jost & Banaji, 1994; Jost, 2020).

Social identity threat was also inspired by social identity theory and developed by Branscombe and colleagues in 1999 as a mechanism to understand and explain the different types of threats that arise from group identity being threatened.

=== Prosocial behaviors ===
Social identification can lead individuals to engage in prosocial behaviours towards others. Examples include contexts such as food drives or even shared purchasing patterns, as might occur for motorcycle riders. Consumers may have sub-identities that are nested into a larger identity. As a result, "[w]hen consumers identify with the overall community, they assist other consumers. However, consumers are less likely to help consumers in the overall community when identifying with a subgroup".

=== Reluctance to bet against identity-relevant outcomes ===
Social identities are a valued aspect of the self, and people will sacrifice their pecuniary self-interest to maintain the self-perception that they belong to a given social group. Political partisans and fans of sports teams (e.g., Republicans and Democrats, or MLB, NFL, NCAA fans) are reluctant to bet against the success of their party or team because of the diagnostic cost such a bet would incur to their identification with it. As a result, partisans and fans will reject even very favorable bets against identity-relevant desired outcomes. More than 45% of N.C.A.A. basketball and hockey fans, for example, turned down a free, real chance to earn $5 if their team lost its upcoming game.

== Controversies ==
=== Self-esteem hypothesis ===
Social identity theory proposes that people are motivated to achieve and maintain positive concepts of themselves. Some researchers, including Michael Hogg and Dominic Abrams, thus propose a fairly direct relationship between positive social identity and self-esteem. In what has become known as the "self-esteem hypothesis", self-esteem is predicted to relate to in-group bias in two ways. Firstly, successful intergroup discrimination elevates self-esteem. Secondly, depressed or threatened self-esteem promotes intergroup discrimination. Empirical support for these predictions has been mixed.

Some social identity theorists, including John Turner, consider the self-esteem hypothesis as not canonical to social identity theory. In fact, the self-esteem hypothesis is argued to be conflictual with the tenets of the theory. It is argued that the self-esteem hypothesis misunderstands the distinction between a social identity and a personal identity. Along those lines, John Turner and Penny Oakes argue against an interpretation of positive distinctiveness as a straightforward need for self-esteem or "quasi-biological drive toward prejudice". They instead favour a somewhat more complex conception of positive self-concept as a reflection of the ideologies and social values of the perceiver. Additionally, it is argued that the self-esteem hypothesis neglects the alternative strategies to maintaining a positive self-concept that are articulated in social identity theory (i.e., individual mobility and social creativity).

=== Positive-negative asymmetry ===
In what has been dubbed the Positive-Negative Asymmetry Phenomenon, researchers have shown that punishing the out-group benefits self-esteem less than rewarding the in-group. From this finding it has been extrapolated that social identity theory is therefore unable to deal with bias on negative dimensions. Social identity theorists, however, point out that for ingroup favouritism to occur a social identity "must be psychologically salient", and that negative dimensions may be experienced as a "less fitting basis for self-definition". This important qualification is subtly present in social identity theory, but is further developed in self-categorization theory. Empirical support for this perspective exist. It has been shown that when experiment participants can self-select negative dimensions that define the ingroup no positive–negative asymmetry is found.

=== Intergroup similarity ===
It has been posited that social identity theory suggests that similar groups should have an increased motivation to differentiate themselves from each other. Subsequently, empirical findings where similar groups are shown to possess increased levels of intergroup attraction and decreased levels of in-group bias have been interpreted as problematic for the theory. Elsewhere it has been suggested that this apparent inconsistency may be resolved by attending to social identity theory's emphasis on the importance of the perceived stability and legitimacy of the intergroup status hierarchy.

=== Predictive power ===
Social identity theory has been criticised for having far greater explanatory power than predictive power. That is, while the relationship between independent variables and the resulting intergroup behaviour may be consistent with the theory in retrospect, that particular outcome is often not that which was predicted at the outset. A rebuttal to this charge is that the theory was never advertised as the definitive answer to understanding intergroup relationships. Instead it is stated that social identity theory must go hand in hand with sufficient understanding of the specific social context under consideration. The latter argument is consistent with the explicit importance that the authors of social identity theory placed on the role of "objective" factors, stating that in any particular situation "the effects of [social identity theory] variables are powerfully determined by the previous social, economic, and political processes".

=== SIT-lite ===
Some researchers interpret social identity theory as drawing a direct link between identification with a social group and ingroup favoritism. This is because social identity theory was proposed as a way of explaining the ubiquity of ingroup favoritism in the minimal group paradigm. For example, Charles Stangor and John Jost state that "a main premise of social identity theory is that ingroup members will favour their own group over other groups". This interpretation is rejected by other researchers. For example, Alex Haslam states that "although vulgarized versions of social identity theory argue that 'social identification leads automatically to discrimination and bias', in fact…discrimination and conflict are anticipated only in a limited set of circumstances". The likening of social identity theory with social competition and ingroup favouritism is partly attributable to the fact that early statements of the theory included empirical examples of ingroup favouritism, while alternative positive distinctiveness strategies (e.g., social creativity) were at that stage theoretical assertions. Regardless, in some circles the prediction of a straightforward identification-bias correlation has earned the pejorative title "social identity theory-lite". This raises the problem of whether social identity theory really does explain the ubiquity of ingroup favoritism in the minimal group paradigm without making recourse to "the generic norm hypothesis" originally proposed by Tajfel but later abandoned.

== See also ==
- Asset poverty
- Bagholder
- Causes of mental disorders
- Identity performance
- Identity politics
- In-group and out-group
- Kyriarchy
- Labelling
- Low-life
- Other (philosophy)
- Political identity
- Social reality
- Social stigma
