= List of social psychologists =

The following is a list of academicians, both past and present, who are widely renowned for their groundbreaking contributions to the field of social psychology.

== A ==
- Dominic Abrams
- Lauren Alloy
- Icek Ajzen
- Floyd Allport
- Gordon Allport
- Irwin Altman
- Craig A. Anderson
- Norman H. Anderson
- Michael Argyle
- Elliot Aronson
- Solomon Asch
- Berit Ås

== B ==
- Anna Costanza Baldry
- Mahzarin Banaji
- Albert Bandura - Canadian psychologist known for social learning theory (or social cognitive theory) and self efficacy
- John Bargh - known for having several priming experiments that failed subsequent attempts at direct replication
- Robert A. Baron
- Daniel Batson
- Martin Bauer
- Roy Baumeister
- Howard Becker
- Daryl Bem - proposed self-perception theory of attitude change, competitor to Leon Festinger's cognitive dissonance theory
- Ellen S. Berscheid
- Michael Billig
- Hart Blanton
- Marilynn Brewer
- Roger Brown
- Brad Bushman

== C ==
- John Cacioppo
- Donald T. Campbell
- Tijuana L. Canders
- Merrill Carlsmith
- Nicholas Christenfeld
- Robert Cialdini - known for his research on influence processes
- Ronald L. Cohen
- Peter T. Coleman
- Terri Conley
- Stuart W. Cook
- Charles Horton Cooley
- Nora Cortiñas
- William Crano

== D ==
- James M. Dabbs, Jr.
- John M. Darley
- Shai Davidai
- Edward L. Deci - co-founder of Self-Determination Theory
- Morton Deutsch
- Ed Diener
- Carol Dweck

== E ==
- Phoebe C. Ellsworth
- Jennifer Eberhardt

== F ==
- Steven Fein
- Leon Festinger - originator of cognitive dissonance theory and social comparison theory
- Susan Fiske
- Erich Fromm

== G ==
- Stanley O. Gaines
- Laszlo Garai - developed theory of social identity as mediating factor
- George Gaskell
- Bertram Gawronski
- Kenneth Gergen
- Daniel Gilbert
- Thomas Gilovich - psychologist and key figure in behavioral economics
- Erving Goffman
- Mirta González Suárez
- John Gottman - researcher known for his work in identifying relationship behaviors that predict relationships' future quality and stability
- Anthony Greenwald - creator of the Implicit Association Test
- Jaber F. Gubrium - everyday life; narrative ethnography; organizational embeddedness

== H ==
- Jonathan Haidt
- Rom Harré
- Elaine Hatfield
- Fritz Heider
- Miles Hewstone
- E. Tory Higgins - motivation, regulatory focus theory, regulatory engagement theory, regulatory mode
- Hilde Himmelweit
- Geert Hofstede
- Michael Hogg - social identity theory
- Carl Hovland

== J ==
- Irving Janis - known for his landmark research on the concept of "groupthink"
- Edward E. Jones - co-authored the first paper on what was later called fundamental attribution error; known for researching actor-observer bias
- Sandra Jovchelovitch
- Charles Hubbard Judd

== K ==
- Daniel Kahneman
- Tim Kasser
- Saul Kassin
- Harold Kelley
- George Kelly
- Herbert Kelman
- Arie Kruglanski
- Ziva Kunda

== L ==
- Bibb Latané - initiated research on bystander intervention in emergencies (with John Darley), social loafing (with Kip Williams), and Dynamic Social Impact Theory (with Andrzej Nowak)
- Mark Leary
- Gustave Le Bon
- Mark Lepper
- Becca Levy
- Kurt Lewin - often called "the father of social psychology"; one of the first researchers to study group dynamics and organizational development

== M ==
- Eleanor Maccoby
- Ivana Markova
- Hazel Rose Markus
- Everett Dean Martin
- Francis T. McAndrew
- David McClelland
- Joseph E. McGrath - group dynamics researcher
- George Herbert Mead - American philosopher (pragmatist), sociologist, and psychologist; a founder of social psychology; founder of symbolic interactionism
- Stanley Milgram - performed famous experiment that demonstrated people's excessive willingness to obey authority figures
- Walter Mischel - among the first to promote a situationist view of personality
- Abraham Moles - one of the first to establish and analyze links between aesthetics and information theory
- Serge Moscovici
- Gordon Moskowitz
- David Myers (psychologist)

== N ==
- David Nadler
- Theodore Newcomb
- Richard Nisbett
- Mary Louise Northway
- Andrzej Nowak

== O ==
- Richard Ofshe
- Tom Ostrom

== P ==
- Ian Parker
- James W. Pennebaker
- Richard E. Petty
- Anthony Pratkanis
- Tom Pyszczynski
- Ivan Pavlov

== R ==
- Wilhelm Reich - mass psychology
- Steve Reicher
- Harry Reis
- Max Ringelmann
- Robert Rosenthal - Pygmalion effect
- Lee Ross - performed pioneering research on the fundamental attribution error
- Zick Rubin - author of the first empirical measurement of love
- Richard M. Ryan - co-founder of Self-Determination Theory
- Richard M. Ryckman

== S ==
- Stanley Schachter
- Gunter Schmidt
- Norbert Schwarz - known for his work on metacognitive experiences and survey methodology
- David P. Schmitt
- Martin Seligman
- Claire Selltiz
- Muzafer Sherif
- Boris Sidis - groundbreaking work on the psychology of suggestion, dissociative identity disorder, psychopathology, and genius
- Volkmar Sigusch
- Linda Skitka
- Diederik Stapel - founder of the Tilburg Institute for Behavioral Economics Research, later suspended from Tilburg University for fabricating and manipulating data
- Claude Steele - known for his groundbreaking work on stereotype threat and for introducing self-affirmation theory
- William Swann - known for developing self-verification theory

== T ==
- Henri Tajfel
- Jeffrey S. Tanaka
- Gabriel Tarde
- Carol Tavris
- Shelley Taylor
- John Thibaut - first editor of JESP, known for Interdependence Theory from "The Social Psychology of Groups"
- Norman Triplett - widely credited with the first published study in the field of social psychology, with his work on social facilitation
- Bruce Tuckman
- John C. Turner
- Amos Tversky

== W ==
- Daniel Wegner
- Karl E. Weick
- Kipling Williams
- Glenn D Wilson
- Timothy Wilson
- Robert S. Wyer - social cognition and information processing
- Wendy Wood

== Z ==
- Robert Zajonc - first academic to study the mere exposure effect
- Mark Zanna
- Philip Zimbardo - known for conducting the Stanford prison experiment

== See also ==
- List of psychologists
- List of sociologists
