= Dominic Abrams =

British psychologist and social researcher

Dominic Abrams FBA FAcSS FBPsS
- Born: William Dominic Joshua Abrams; 11 April 1958 (age 68); Cambridge, United Kingdom
- Education: University of Manchester (BA); London School of Economics (MPhil); University of Kent (PhD)
- Known for: Research on: Social Identity, Intergroup Prejudice, Group Processes
- Awards: BPS President's Award, SPSSI Distinguished Contribution Award
- Scientific career
- Fields: Psychology; Social psychology Developmental psychology Applied psychology
- Workplaces: University of Kent
- Thesis: Social Identity, Self-Awareness and Intergroup Behaviour (1984)
- Doctoral advisor: Rupert Brown

William Dominic Joshua Abrams (born 11 April 1958) is a Professor of Social Psychology and the Director of the Centre for the Study of Group Processes in the School of Psychology at the University of Kent. His research examines social identity, social cohesion, inclusion and exclusion, prejudice, discrimination, social attitudes, social change and social influence in groups across the life course. It spans social and developmental psychology and gerontology and uses a wide range of methods, most frequently surveys and laboratory and field experiments.

Abrams has published over 300 articles, chapters and books, and has supervised more than 30 doctoral students.

== Early life and education ==
Dominic Abrams was born in Cambridge, England, where he attended Park Street Primary School and then Impington Village College. He moved to Yorkshire with his parents in 1973, living in Elland and attending the Brooksbank School, before attending the newly established Greenhead 6th Form College in Huddersfield . He completed his Bachelor of Arts degree in Psychology from the University of Manchester, where he was supervised and mentored by Anthony Manstead and then studied for his Master's degree in Social Psychology from the London School of Economics and Political Science, under the supervision of Paul Harris and Hilde Himmelweit who encouraged him to pursue his PhD in Social Psychology at the new Social Psychology Research Unit directed by Geoffrey Stephenson at the University of Kent to pursue his interests in social and developmental psychology. There he was supervised by Rupert Brown and Kevin Durkin.

== Career ==
His first academic post was in 1983 as temporary lecturer at the University of Bristol. He was then appointed as a 'New blood' Lecturer in Social Cognition at University of Dundee in 1985. In 1989 he returned to the University of Kent as Lecturer in Social Psychology, where he then held a senior lectureship (1991), readership (1992) and a personal chair (Professor, 1993). He has held a wide range of roles at Kent including Head of Department. In 1995 he established the Centre for the Study of Group Processes, of which he remains director.

Abrams was Secretary/Treasurer of the Social Psychology Section of the British Psychological Society (BPS) (1985-9). He joined the Executive Committee and served as Secretary of the European Association of Social Psychology (1999-2005). He is a founding Trustee and member of the Board of Directors for the newly created Academy for Learned Societies in the Social Sciences and was elected chair of its Committee of Learned Societies (2000-2005). He was re-elected to Council of the Academy of Social Sciences from 2009 to 2012. From 2003 to 2006 he was member of the British Psychological Society Board of Trustees and Chair of the Research Board. He served for 6 years on the ESRC Research Board and Grant Award Panel, and has been a member of a variety of ESRC panels and initiatives. He was a member of the REF 2014 panel for Psychology and has served on various international grant panels including for the European Research Council.

He was elected to the Council of Society for the Psychological Study of Social Issues (American Psychological Association, Division 9) in 2009 and 2012 was elected president, the first to be elected from outside the US in its 70 year history.

He was appointed Vice President (Social Sciences) of the British Academy from 2017 to 2020. He currently chairs its Cohesive Societies programme, its collaborative BA/Nuffield Foundation research programme on Understanding Communities. Since 2020 he has been the academic lead for the BA's Covid and Society policy work.

Abrams was appointed Officer of the Order of the British Empire (OBE) in the 2023 New Year Honours for services to social sciences.

== Research ==
Abrams' work tackles major societal challenges through the lens of social psychology, characterised by theoretically driven inquiry that combines laboratory experiments, field studies and surveys. His work has integrated European and North American traditions in social psychology. For the journal Group Processes and Intergroup Relations, now in its 25th year, Abrams is Chief Editor (with Michael Hogg).

Abrams' early work explored how young people's social identity affected their economic and political choices, and he then continued with projects on young people's responses to the HIV-AIDS epidemic. He co-authored the book Social Identifications with his lifelong collaborator Michael A. Hogg

Later, Abrams' built a large-scale research programme into the role of prejudice in contemporary societies, covering many different aspects ranging from rape myth acceptance to age discrimination and stereotype threat. He directed the Equality and Human Rights Commission's first (2006) and subsequent (2017) benchmarking surveys of prejudice across Britain, and led a series of surveys and reports for Age UK and the Department for Work and Pensions on age discrimination, as well as developing and leading the first European Social Survey module on the topic. One of the major outcomes of this work was newfound attention to how ageism seriously affects the young as well as the old.

=== COVID-19 ===
During the COVID-19 pandemic, Abrams led a major review by the British Academy for the UK Government Office For Science to assess the long-term societal impact of COVID-19 in areas such as health and well-being, communities culture and belonging and knowledge, skills and employment. The review drew from research across the humanities and social sciences, and led to two major reports which detailed the impact, effect and policy opportunities arising from the pandemic. The review found nine areas of long-term societal impact, seven strategic goals for policy makers, and five core principles for social and economic recovery.

== Bibliography ==
- Abrams, D., Christian, J.N, & Gordon D. (Eds.) (2007), Multidisciplinary handbook of social exclusion research. Oxford: Wiley-Blackwell. ISBN 978-0-470-09513.
- Abrams, D., & Hogg, M.A. (Eds., 1999) Social Identity and Social Cognition. Oxford: Blackwell. ISBN 978-0-631-20642-2
- Hogg, M.A., & Abrams, D. (1988) Social Identifications: A Social Psychology of Intergroup Relations and Group Processes, London: Routledge. ISBN 978-0-415-00694-1/ 00694-3.
