= Polyphasia =

Polyphasia may refer to:

- Cognitive polyphasia
- Polyphasia, a taxonomic synonym for the moth genus Dysstroma

== See also ==
- Polyphase (disambiguation)
