= Robert Maclaughlin Farr =

British psychologist (1936–2013)

- Born: 10 December 1935
- Died: 11 October 2013 (aged 77)
- Education: Queen's University Belfast, Birkbeck, University of London
- Scientific career
- Fields: Social psychology
- Workplaces: University College London, University of Glasgow, London School of Economics
- Thesis: The social psychology of selection: a theoretical model of man and a conceptual framework for research (1977)
- Doctoral students: George Gaskell, Peter Harris, Hélène Joffe, Sandra Jovchelovitch, Caroline Howarth, Marie-Claude Gervais, Syed Muhammad Atif Imtiaz

Robert Maclaughlin Farr (1936–2013) was a social psychologist from Northern Ireland who played an important role in promoting and developing social representation theory.

== Career ==
Rob Farr was born in Northern Ireland in 1936 where he gained a BSc (1957) followed by a MSc (1959) in Psychology from Queen's University Belfast. After this he studied for the Church of Ireland ministry at Trinity College Dublin but gave up after a short period. In 1962 returned to Queen's University as an assistant lecturer for two years and then worked as researcher with the Royal Air Force for another two years. He took up a post as a lecturer in social psychology at University College London in 1966.

In 1979 he was appointed Chair of Psychology at the University of Glasgow but did not stay there for long. In 1983 he was appointed Chair of Social Psychology at the London School of Economics and returned to London. His inaugural lecture was entitled Some reflections on the historical development of psychology as an experimental and social science (Farr, 1985). He remained at that institution until he retired in 2000. During that period he supervised many successful graduate students. He had a lasting impact on what became the Department of Psychological and Behavioural Science which awards a prize each year in his name.

He was active in the British Psychological Society of which he was elected president in 1986. His Presidential address was entitled The Science of Mental Life: A social psychological analysis in which he championed the work of George Herbert Mead (Farr, 1987).

== Research ==
While he was at University College London he spent a sabbatical year in Paris working with Serge Moscovici. He returned enthused with the ideas of social representation theory and spent the remainder of his career developing and promoting these ideas (see Farr & Moscovici, 1984; Markova & Farr, 1995; Wagner, 2020).

He had a continuing interest in the development of social psychology and published a collection of his articles on this topic in 1996 (Farr, 1996). He planned to publish a book entitled A Social and Reflexive Model of Man: Theory and Evidence. The Wellcome Library contains his correspondence with Henri Tajfel about this book and a manuscript draft.

== Personal life ==
In 1966, he married Ann Wood (which later ended) with whom he had two children - Angus and Fiona.

== Publications ==
- Farr, R.M. (1996). The Roots of Modern Social Psychology. Oxford: Blackwell.
- Farr, R.M. (1987). The Science of Mental Life: A social psychological analysis. Bulletin of the British Psychological Society, 40, 1–17.
- Farr, R.M. (1985). Some reflections on the historical development of psychology as an experimental and social science: Inaugural lecture. London: LSE.
- Farr, R.M., & Moscovici, S. (Eds.). (1984). Social Representations. Cambridge: Cambridge University Press.
- Markova, I., & Farr, R.M. (eds) (1995) Representations of Health and Illness and Handicap. Chur: Harwood Academic.

== Awards ==
- 1986 - President, British Psychological Society
- 1981 - Member, Academia Europaea (Behavioural Sciences Section)
