= Denise Jodelet =

French social psychologist

- Born: 1935 (age 90–91); France
- Occupation: Social psychologist
- Awards: Ordre des Palmes Académiques (Chevalier)

Academic background
- Education: École des Hautes Études en Sciences Sociales
- Thesis: Civils et brédins: Rapport à la folie et représentations sociales de la maladie mentale en milieu rural, Thèse d’État. (1985)

Denise Jodelet is a French social psychologist with particular expertise in social representation theory and socio-cultural psychology.

== Career ==
Jodelet began her research career in 1965 at the Laboratoire de Psychologie Sociale at the École des Hautes Études en Sciences Sociales (EHESS) in Paris working with Serge Moscovici. In 1991 she succeeded Moscovici as Director of the Laboratoire for eleven years. During her time at EHESS she supervised forty doctoral dissertations. She developed and maintained strong collaboration with researchers in Latin America. She retired as Director of Studies (Emeritus) at the EHESS. She was President of the Serge Moscovici World Network.

== Research ==
Inspired by Moscovici's work on social representation theory she further developed it both theoretically and empirically. She took it in an innovative direction in her early research which was concerned with exploring the social dynamics within a rural French community which provided accommodation for adults with mental health problems. Jodelet adopted an ethnographic approach spending considerable time within the community getting to know the residents and how they organised their daily routines. From this she developed a sophisticated understanding of how mental illness was represented in the community not only in language but also in everyday practices. Her work was granted a doctorate in 1985 and subsequently published initially in French (1989) and then in English (1991). This work formed the beginnings of her rapprochement between social psychology and anthropology and the development of a more socio-cultural psychology.

She subsequently conducted research on the application of social representation theory in the fields of the environment, education, the body and health.

In 2008, a collection of essays was published in her honour.

== Honours ==
- Chevalier dans l'Ordre des Palmes Académiques
- Doctor Honoris Causa at University of Buenos Aires, Córdoba, Luján, Quilmes (Argentina), Rio de Janeiro, João Pessoa, Paraíba (Brazil), Panteion University (Greece), Guadalajara (Mexico)
- Honorary Member, Association of Psychology and Psychiatry of Adults and Children, Greek Association of United Nations

== Key works ==
=== Books ===
- Jodelet, D., Viet, J., & Besnard, P. (1970). La psychologie sociale, une discipline en mouvement. Paris-LaHaye: Mouton.
- Jodelet, D. (1989). Folies et représentations sociales. Paris: PUF. (Translation by T. Pownall, Madness and social representations. Berkeley, CA: California University Press, 1991.)
- Jodelet, D. (ed.) (1989). Les represéntations sociales. Paris: PUF.
- Jodelet, D. (2016). Représentations sociales et mondes de vie (edited by Nikos Kalampalikis). Paris: Editions des archives contemporaines.
- Kalampalikis, N., Jodelet, D., Wieviorka, M., Moscovici, D., & Moscovici, P. (Eds.) (2019). Serge Moscovici : un regard sur les mondes communs. Paris: Éditions de la MSH.
- Jodelet, D., Vala, J., & Drozda-Senkowska (eds.) (2020). Societies under threat: A pluri-disciplinary approach. Cham: Springer.

=== Chapters ===
- Jodelet, D. (1984). The representation of the body and its transformations. In R. Farr & S. Moscovici (eds.) Social Representations. Cambridge: Cambridge University Press.
- Jodelet, D. (1987). The study of people-environment relations in France. In D. Stokols & I. Altman (eds.) Handbook of Environmental Psychology. New York: Wiley.
- Jodelet, D. (1993). Relationship between indigenous psychologies and social representations. In J. Berry & U. Kim (eds.) Indigenous Psychologies. Los Angeles: Sage.
- Jodelet, D. (1994/2000). Le corps, la personne et autrui. In S. Moscovici (Ed.), Psychologie sociale des relations à autrui (pp. 41–68). Paris, Nathan.
- Jodelet, D. (1996). Las representaciones sociales del medio ambiente. In L. Iniguez & E. Pol (Eds.), Cognición, representación y apropiación del espacio (pp. 29–44). Barcelona: Publicacions de la Universitat de Barcelona.
- Jodelet, D. (1996). Représentation sociale de la maladie et insertion des malades mentaux. In J.-C. Abric (Ed.), Exclusion sociale, insertion et prévention (pp. 97–111). Toulouse, Erès.
- Jodelet, D. (1996). Les processus psychosociaux de l’exclusion. In S. Paugam (Ed.), L’exclusion, l’état des savoirs (pp. 66–77). Paris, La Découverte.
- Jodelet, D. & Ohana, J. (1996). Rappresentazioni sociali dell’allattamento materno, una pratica sanitaria tra natura e cultura. In G. Petrillo (Ed.), Psicologia sociale della salute (pp. 139–168). Naples : Liguori.
- Jodelet, D. (1997). Il corpo, la persona e gli altri. In S. Moscovici (Ed.), La relazione con l’altro (pp. 47–80). Milano: Cortina.
- Jodelet, D., Leport, C., Moulin, P., Bugler, C., Fraval, J., D’Herouville, D., Vincent, I., Mallet, D., Marmagne, V., Berki, Z. Hervier, S., Salamagne, M.-H., Gabriel, C., & Vilde, J.-L. (1998). Sida et soins palliatifs : Les soignants face aux malades en phase avancée de l’infection VIH. In M. Duroussy (Ed.), Des professionnels face au SIDA : évolution des rôles, identités et fonctions (pp. 67–81). Paris, ANRS.
- Jodelet, D. (1998). Representações do contágio e a AIDS. In D. Jodelet & M. Madeira (Eds.), AIDS e representações sociais à busca de sentidos. Natal : Editora da UFRJ.
- Jodelet, D. (1998). El lado moral y afectivo de la historia. Un ejemplo de memoria de masas : el caso, de K. Barbie “el carnicero de Lyón”. In D. Páez, J. Valencia, J. W. Pennebaker, B. Rimé & D. Jodelet (Eds.), Memorias Colectivas de Procesos Culturales y Políticos (pp. 341–360). Bibao : Servicio Ed. UPV.
- Jodelet, D. (1999). À alteridade como produto e processo psicossocial. In A. Arruda (Ed.), Representando a alteridade (pp. 47–68). Petrópolis : Vozes.
- Jodelet, D. (1999). Os processos psicossociais da exclusão. In B. Sawaia (Ed.), As artimanhas da exclusão. Análise psicossocial e ética da desigualdade social (pp. 53–66). Petrópolis: Vozes.
- Haas, V. & Jodelet, D. (1999). Pensée et mémoire sociale. In J.-P. Pétard (Ed.), Psychologie sociale (pp. 111–160). Paris, Bréal.
- Haas, V. & Jodelet, D. (2000). La mémoire, ses aspects sociaux et collectifs. In N. Roussiau (Ed.), Psychologie sociale (pp. 121–134). Paris, Inpress.
- Jodelet, D. (2000). Representaciones sociales: contribución a un saber sociocultural sin fronteras. In D. Jodelet & T.A. Guerrero (Eds.), Develando la cultura. Estudios en representaciones sociales (pp. 7–30). Mexico, UNAM.
- Jodelet, D. & Ohana, J. (2000). Représentations sociales de l’allaitement maternel, une pratique de santé entre nature et culture. In G. Petrillo (Ed.), Santé et société. La santé et la maladie comme phénomènes sociaux (pp. 139–165). Lausanne-Paris, Delachaux et Niestlé.
- Jodelet, D. (2001). À la recherche de la mémoire. In F. Buschini & N. Kalampalikis (Eds.), Penser la vie, le social, la nature (pp. 467–481). Paris, Éditions de la Msh.
- Jodelet, D. (2001). Representações sociais, um domínio em expansão. In D. Jodelet (Ed.), As representações sociais (pp. 17–44). Rio de Janeiro: Ed. Uerj.
- Jodelet, D. (2002). À cidade e a memoria. In V. Del Rio, C. Rose Duarte & P. Afonso Rheingantz (Eds.), Projeto do lugar. Colaboraçao entre psicologia, arquitetura e urbanismo (pp. 31–43). Rio de Janeiro: Ed. PROARQ.
- Jodelet, D. (2003). Aperçus sur les méthodologies qualitatives. In S. Moscovici & F. Buschini (Eds.), Les méthodes des sciences humaines (pp. 139–160). Paris, PUF.
- Jodelet, D. (2004). Experiencia y representaciones sociales. In Eulogio R. Romero (Ed.), Representaciones sociales. Atisbos y cavilaciones en el devenir de cuatro décadas. Puebla: universidad Autónoma de Puebla.
- Jodelet, D. (2005). Vinte anos da teoria das representações sociais no Brasil. In D.C. Oliveira & P.H. Farias Campos (Eds.), Representações sociais, uma teoria sem fronteiras (pp. 11–21). Rio de Janeiro: Museu da República.
- Jodelet, D. (2005). Experiência e representações sociais. In M.S. de Stephano Menin & A. Moraes Shimizu (Eds.), Experiência e representação social. Questões teóricas e metodológicas (pp. 23–56). São Paulo : Casa do psicólogo.
- Jodelet, D. (2005). Formes et figures de l’altérité. In M. Sanchez-Mazas & L. Licata, (Eds.), L’autre. Regards psychosociaux (pp. 23–47). Grenoble, PUG.
- Jodelet, D. (2006). El otro, su construcción, su conocimiento. In S. Valencia Abundiz (Ed.), Representaciones sociales. Alteridad, epistemología y movimientos sociales (pp. 21–42). Guadalajara, Univ. de Guadalajara.
- Jodelet, D. (2006). Place de l’expérience vécue dans les processus de formation des représentations sociales. In V. Haas (Ed.), Les savoirs du quotidien (pp. 235–255). Rennes, PUR.
- Jodelet, D. (2006). Représentations sociales. In P. Castel & S. Mesure (Eds.), Dictionnaire des sciences humaines (pp. 1003–1005). Paris, PUF.
- Jodelet, D. (2006). Serge Moscovici. In P. Castel & S. Mesure (Eds.), Dictionnaire des sciences humaines. Paris, PUF.
- Haas, V. & Jodelet, D. (2007). Pensée et mémoire sociales. In J.-P. Pétard (Ed.), Psychologie sociale. Paris, Bréal.
- Jodelet, D. (2007). Imbricaciones entre representaciones sociales e intervención. In T. Rodríguez Salazar & M. de Lourdes García Curiel (Eds.), Representaciones sociales. Teoría e investigación (pp. 191–217). Ed. CUCSH-UdG.
- Jodelet, D. (2007). Contribuições das representações sociais para a análise das relações entre educação e trabalho. In L.A. Pardal, A.M. Martins, C. Prado de Sousa, A. del Dujo, V. Placco (Eds.) Educação e trabalho: representações, competências e trajectórias (pp. 11–26). Aveiro: Univ. de Aveiro.
- Bello, R.A., Sá, C.P., & Jodelet, D. (2008). A representação social e a eficácia das práticas de cura na umbanda e afins no Rio de Janeiro. In A.V. Zanella et al. (Eds.), Psicologia e práticas sociais (pp. 229–236). Rio de Janeiro: Centro Edelstein de Pesquisas Sociais.
- Jodelet, D. (2008). Travesias latinoamericanas: dos miradas francesas sobre Brasil y Mexico. In A. Arruda & M. de Alba (Eds.), Espacios imaginarios y representaciones sociales. Aportes desde Latinoamerica (pp. 99–128). Madrid : Anthropos.
- Jodelet, D. (2009). Rappresentazioni e scienze sociali: incontri e rapporti reciproci. In A. Palmonari & F. Emiliani (Eds.), Paradigmi delle rappresentazioni sociali (pp. 253–282). Roma: Il Mulino.
- Jodelet, D. (2009). Contribuição do estudo das representações sociais para uma psico-sociologia do campo religioso. In D. * Jodelet & A. Almeida (Eds.), Interdisciplinaridade e diversidade de paradigmas (pp. 203–224). Brasília: Thesaurus.
- Jodelet, D. (2010). Le loup, nouvelle figure de l'imaginaire féminin. Réflexions sur la dimension mythique des représentations sociales. In D. Jodelet & E. Cohelo Paredes (Eds.) (2010). Pensée mythique et représentations sociales. Paris, L’Harmattan.
- Jodelet, D. (2011). L’approche de la dimension sociale dans la psychologie communautaire. In T. Saïas (Ed.), Introduction à la psychologie communautaire (pp. 27–4≤0). Paris, Dunod.
- Jodelet, D. (2012). About the impact of the theory of social representations. In R. Permanadeli, D. Jodelet & T. Sugiman (Eds.), Alternative Production of Knowledge and Social Representations (pp. 3–15). Jakarta: Univ. of Indonesia Press.
- Jodelet, D. (2012). Social representations study and interlocution between knowledges in a globalized space. In R. Permanadeli, D. Jodelet, T. Sugiman (Eds.), Production of Knowledge and Social Representations. Jakarta: University of Indonesia Press.
- Jodelet, D. (2012). Interconnections between social representations and intervention. In A.-M. De Rosa (Ed.), Social representations in the ‘social arena’ (pp. 77–88). London: Routledge.
- Jodelet, D. (2013). Culture and health practices. In A.-M. De Rosa (Ed.), Social representations in the ‘social arena’ (pp. 153–165). London: Routledge.
- Jodelet, D. & Haas, V. (2014). Memorie e rappresentazioni sociali. In A. Palmonari & F. Emiliani(Eds.), Psicologia delle rappresentazioni sociali: teoria e applicazioni (pp. 123–147). Bologna: Il Mulino.
- Jodelet, D. (2014). A fecundidade multipla da obra “A Psicanalise, sua imagem e seu publico”. In A.M. de Oliveira Almeida, M. de Fátima de Souza Santos, Z. Araujo Trindade (Eds.), Teoria das Representações Sociais: 50 anos. Brazilia: Technopolitik.
- Jodelet, D. (2014). A propos des jeux et enjeux de savoir dans l'Education Thérapeutique des Patients. In O. Las Vergnas, E. Jouet, E. Nöel-Hureaux (Eds.), Nouvelles coopérations réflexives en santé. De l’expérience des malades et des professionnels aux partenariats de soins, de formation et de recherche (pp. 59–76). Paris, Editions des Archives contemporaines.
- Jodelet, D. (2015). Processus de mise en sens de l'espace et pratiques sociales. In D. Germanos, M. Liapi (Eds.), Places for Learning Experiences. Think, Make, Change. Greek National Documentation Centre.
- Jodelet, D. (2015). Le corps représenté et ses transformations. In D. Jodelet (Ed.), Représentations sociales et mondes de vie (pp. 177–190). Paris, Éditions des Archives contemporaines.
- Jodelet, D. (2015). Un faire sur la pensée sociale. In D. Jodelet (Ed.), Représentations sociales et mondes de vie (pp. 3–13). Paris, Éditions des Archives contemporaines.
- Jodelet, D. (2015). Considérations sur le traitement de la stigmatisation en santé mentale. In D. Jodelet, Représentations sociales et mondes de vie (pp. 202–214). Paris, Éditions des Archives contemporaines.
- Jodelet, D. (2015). Les représentations socio-spatiales de la ville. In D. Jodelet, Représentations sociales et mondes de vie (pp. 92–106). Paris, Editions des Archives contemporaines.
- Jodelet, D. (1992/2015). Mémoire de masse : le côté moral et affectif de l’Histoire. In D. Jodelet, Représentations sociales et mondes de vie (pp. 124–144). Paris, Éditions des Archives contemporaines.
- Jodelet, D. (2017). Le savoir expérientiel des patients, son statut épistémologique et social. In A.O. Silva, B.V. Camargo (Eds.), Representações sociais do envelhecimento e da saúde (pp. 270–294). EDUFRN Editors.
- Jodelet, D. (2017). Les menaces : passer du mot au concept. In S. Caillaud, V. Bonnot & E. Drozda-Senkowska (Eds.), Menaces sociales et environnementales : repenser la société des risques (pp. 17–30). Rennes, PUR.
- Jodelet, D. (2017). Reflexões sobre o tratamento da noção de representação social em psicologia social. In D. Jodelet, Representações sociais e mundos de vida (pp. 37–52). Curitiba, Ed. PUCPRess.
- Jodelet, D. (2019). La noción de lo común y las representaciones sociales. In S. Seidmann & N. Pievi (Eds.), Identidades y conflictos sociales. Aportes y desafíos de la investigación sobre representaciones sociales (pp. 612–629). Fundación Universidad de Belgrano - Editorial de Belgrano.
- Jodelet, D. (2019). Représentations sociales. In C. Delory-Momberger (Ed.), Vocabulaire des histoires de vie et de la recherche biographique (pp. 143–146). Toulouse: Érès.
- Jodelet, D. (2019). Une rencontre de la maturité. In S. Seidmann & N. Pievi (Eds.), Identidades y conflictos sociales

=== Articles ===
- Jodelet, D. (2008). Social representations: The beautiful invention. Journal for the Theory of Social Behaviour, 38 (4), 411–430.
- Jodelet, D. (2011). Returning to past features of Serge Moscovici's theory to feed the future. Papers on Social Representations, 20 (2), 39.1-39.11.
- Jodelet, D., & Kalampalikis, N. (2015). Le rayonnement d’une pensée. Bulletin de Psychologie, 68(2), 177-180. (*)
- Pérez, J.A., Kalampalikis, N., Lahlou, S., Jodelet, D., & Apostolidis, T. (2015). In memoriam Serge Moscovici (1925-2014). Bulletin de Psychologie, 68(2), 181-187. (*) (français), European Bulletin of Social Psychology, 27(1), 3-14 (english), Psicologia e Saber Social, 3(2), 182-190 (portugais).
- Mazières, J., Pujol, J.L., Kalampalikis, N., Bouvry, D., Quoix, E., Filleron, T., Targowla, N., Jodelet, D., Milia, J., & Milleron, B. (2015). Perception of lung cancer among a general population and comparison with other cancers. Journal of Thoracic Oncology, 10(3), 420-425.
- Jodelet, D. (2021). The notion of common and social representations. RUDN Journal of Psychology and Pedagogics, 18 (2), 299–314.
- Jodelet, D. (2022). Agnotology: a new field for the study of social representations. Papers on Social Representations, 31(1), 6.1-6.5.
- Jodelet, D. (2024). Cultures et guérisons. Éric de Rosny, l’intégrale. L'Homme, 250(2), 151-152.
- Haas, V., Eskinazi, R.H., & Jodelet, D. (2025). Collective memory and social representations, Current Opinion in Psychology, 66, 102123.

== See also ==
- Collective representations
- Social representations
- Serge Moscovici
