= Cognitive polyphasia =

Cognitive polyphasia describes the condition in which different systems of knowledge or belief, possessing different rationalities, are held by an individual or collective. From Greek: polloi "many", phasis "appearance".

In his research on popular representations of psychoanalysis in France, Serge Moscovici observed that different and even contradictory modes of thinking about the same issue often co-exist. In contemporary societies people are "speaking" medical, psychological, technical, and political languages in their daily affairs. By extending this phenomenon to the level of thought he suggests that "the dynamic co-existence—interference or specialization—of the distinct modalities of knowledge, corresponding to definite relations between man and his environment, determines a state of cognitive polyphasia".

== Extension and applications ==
Cognitive systems do not habitually develop towards a state of consistency. Instead, judgements are based on representational terms being dominant in one field of interests, while playing a minor role in other fields; that is, thoughts tend to be locally but not globally consistent. Contemporaries in Western and non-western societies alike face a variety of situations where particular modes of reasoning fit better than others. Some are more useful in the family and in matters involving relatives, and others are more apt in situations involving political, economic, societal, religious or scientific matters. Knowledge and talking are always situated.

Scientific explanations frequently contradict everyday and common-sense based explanations. Nevertheless, people tend to apply each of the two ways of explanation in their talk depending on the audience and the particular situation. This can be observed with health related issues where Sandra Jovchelovitch and Marie-Claude Gervais have shown how members of the Chinese community attend to Western medical doctors and simultaneously apply traditional Chinese treatments. In their study on modernization processes in the educated middle-class of the city of Patna in India, Wolfgang Wagner, Gerard Duveen, Matthias Themel and Jyoti Verma showed a similar behaviour with regard to mental health. Respondents in the study were more likely to mention traditional ideas about treatment in private and family contexts while displaying "modern" psychiatric reasoning in the public.

In terms of social representation theory such contradictions highlight the role of representational systems as serving the purpose of relating, social belonging and communication in everyday life. This contrasts with science that aims at veridical representations of the world according to standards of scientific evidence. Both systems of knowledge have their own domain of validity but they are at the same time fluid enough to cross-fertilize each other in dialogical encounters.

== See also ==
- Cognitive dissonance
