= Social psychology (disambiguation) =

Social psychology is a subfield of psychology, studying the mentality of the individual in a group.

Social psychology may also refer to:

- Social psychology (sociology), a subfield of sociology, studying the behavior of individuals in groups
- Social Psychology (journal), a peer-reviewed academic journal
- "Social Psychology" (Community), a television episode
- Group dynamics, a field studying the behavior of groups

== See also ==
- Journal of Personality and Social Psychology
- Psychosociology
- Societal psychology
