= Optimal distinctiveness theory =

Social psychological theory

Optimal distinctiveness is a social psychological theory seeking to understand ingroup–outgroup differences. It asserts that individuals desire to attain an optimal balance of inclusion and distinctiveness within and between social groups and situations. These two motives are in constant opposition with each other; when there is too much of one motive, the other must increase in order to counterbalance it and vice versa. The theory of optimal distinctiveness was first proposed by Dr. Marilynn B. Brewer in 1991 and extensively reviewed in 2010 by Drs. Geoffrey J. Leonardelli, Cynthia L. Pickett, and Marilynn Brewer.

== Tenets and mechanisms ==
The origins of optimal distinctiveness theory are linked to evolutionary theory. Brewer argued that humans, during the course of their evolution, developed in ways that would not allow them to live independently of other people; that is, humans need to be part of larger groups in order to survive. Since social groups are thus fundamental for human growth and prosperity, the thesis from which optimal distinctiveness was created states that distinctiveness itself is the motive which determines the "selection and strength of social identities" between social groups and satisfies an individual's own psychological needs.

Building on that thesis, optimal distinctiveness theory states that ingroup distinctiveness must be equalized by assimilation, which is an independent yet opposing motive for group identification. Put more simply, there is more or less a "continuum" characterized by uniqueness (of an individual from the group) at one extreme and homogeneity at the other; individuals must seek the optimal balance of the two extremes in order to maintain successful and self-satisfactory group membership. An "optimal identity", therefore, is one that "satisfies the need for inclusion within the ingroup" (identifying with the particular group) as well as "the need for distinctiveness between the ingroup and outgroups", so as to distinguish that particular group from others. Moreover, Brewer asserts that individuals will only define themselves in terms of appropriate social identities that are "optimally distinctive" and will refuse identities which are either too assimilated or too different. Each experience "occurs at the expense of the other". Equilibrium is dynamic and constantly corrects deviations from optimality. Individuals will seek out and maintain group memberships that allow this equilibrium to be operated at an optimal level, which depends on the particular social context. This optimal level of group membership, according to the theory, is associated with a positive self-concept.

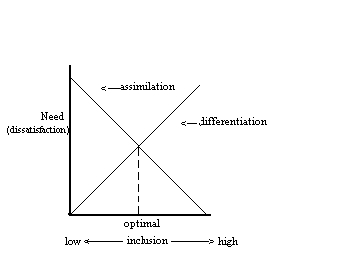
From Brewer's 1991 text, a replica of figure 2 The optimal distinctiveness model.

The following are the tenets of optimal distinctiveness theory as explicitly stated by Dr. Brewer in her 1991 work, "The social self: on being the same and different at the same time" on page 478:

A1. Social identification will be strongest for social groups or categories at that level of inclusiveness which resolves the conflict between needs for differentiation of the self and assimilation with others.

A2. Optimal distinctiveness is independent of the evaluative implications of group membership, although, other things being equal, individuals will prefer positive group identities to negative identities.

A3. Distinctiveness of a given social identity is context-specific. It depends on the frame of reference within which possible social identities are defined at a particular time, which can range from participants in a specific social gathering to the entire human race.

A4. The optimal level of category distinctiveness or inclusiveness is a function of the relative strength (steepness) of the opposing drives for assimilation and differentiation. For any individual, the relative strength of the two needs is determined by cultural norms, individual socialization, and recent experience.

Brewer (1991) continues by stating that an alternative basic tenet of the theory is that "excessive" distinctiveness is detrimental to an individual since it can create stigma, negative self-concept, and an undesirable social identity.

== History and development ==
Optimal distinctiveness theory was built upon and further extended the assumptions of social identity theory and other models that examine ingroup bias and favoritism. Social identity theory, proposed by Tajfel and Turner in 1979, describes the psychological basis of such bias and discrimination. The theory asserts that individuals have multiple selves, or multiple social identities, that interact with other people on different, yet necessary levels. Social identity is thus created through membership in groups. Tajfel and Turner (1986) suggested that this group membership alone is enough to induce favoritism (or positive bias) towards the ingroup at the expense of the outgroup. This sense of ingroup favoritism was coined "positive distinctiveness" and argued to lead to increased self-esteem based on the new capability for individuals to express themselves as "we" in addition to "I". Brewer suggested that the increased self-esteem could flow from social identity rather than ingroup favoritism; therefore, she asserted, self-esteem was not an adequate predictor of why individuals sought ingroup memberships (Brewer, 2003).

Other theories have attempted to account for the development of social identity as separate from the personal self, as well as to determine why individuals have a need to assimilate to their desired ingroups. One of these theories in particular, subjective uncertainty reduction theory, was considered by Brewer when developing her theory of optimal distinctiveness. In this model, group identity serves as self-categorization for individuals with memberships to those specific groups. The motive underlying such self-categorization is in order to reduce ambiguity, or, alternatively, "achieve meaning and clarity" for oneself in social settings. However, Brewer suggests, uncertainty reduction alone does not account for why people continually seek group identification as a necessary part of their lives. Furthermore, Baumeister and Leary explained this pervasive quest for group membership as a need for belongingness. According to Brewer, belongingness is an automatic concomitant of group membership and therefore cannot explain or function as a motive for regulating membership and identity.

== Acceptance of the theory in social psychology ==
Marilynn Brewer's theory of optimal distinctiveness has been well-accepted in the field of social psychology and seems to be a prominent contender amongst other theories similar to its nature, as evidenced by the theory's wide usage in current research. The theory is largely used in research that examines self-stereotyping, stereotypes and prejudice, and self-esteem. Additional examples of current research areas of interest using optimal distinctiveness theory include comparable incomes and effect on life satisfaction in Hong Kong, mortality salience and effect on women's group membership, marketing of tobacco sales to Asian and Pacific Islander populations, the relationship between optimal distinctiveness and values as moderated by uncertainty orientation, and many others, all of which are focused on the ways in which social groups influence people's lives.

Several authors have also uncovered other strategies that people can use to reconcile the need to belong with the need to be distinct. For example, people may join extreme groups, join a group in which the norm revolves around being eccentric, or join a group in which each person is assigned a unique role, but in pursuit of a shared purpose. All these strategies enable people to both comply with the norms of their group while feeling special and distinct.
