= Wolfgang Wagner (social psychologist) =

Austrian social psychologist

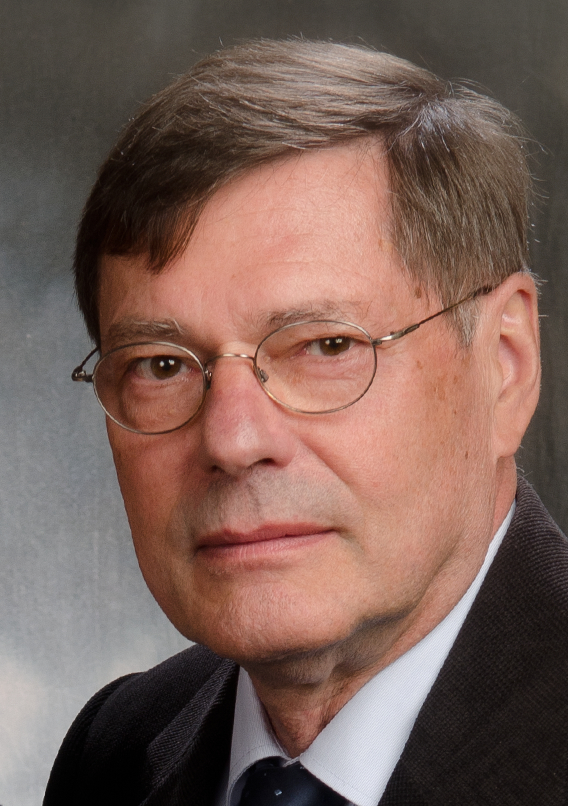
- Born: 1949 (age 76–77); Vienna

Academic background
- Education: University of Vienna
- Thesis: Zu Erwerb und phänomenaler Repräsentation komplexer Begriffe (On the acquisition and phenomenal representation of complex concepts) (1977)

Academic work
- Discipline: Social psychology
- Sub-discipline: social representations
- Institutions: Johannes Kepler University; University of Tartu

Wolfgang Wagner (born 1949 in Vienna, Austria) is an Austrian social psychologist, currently professor at the Department of Psychology at the University of Tartu, Estonia. Formerly he was at the Johannes Kepler University in Linz, Austria, and affiliated with the Department of Social Psychology and Methodology at the University of San Sebastián, Spain. He is renowned for his contributions to the Theory of Social Representations.

== Biography ==
Wolfgang Wagner studied psychology, philosophy and cultural anthropology at the University of Vienna, Austria, where he received his PhD. He trained in sociology at the Vienna Institute for Advanced Studies and took the position of Assistant Professor at Johannes Kepler University in Linz 1979 where he also received his habilitation. He has two children, Joy Pamela who is a politician in Austria, and Joscha David, an engineer. His brother, Günter Paul, is an Evolutionary Biologist. Since 2018 he is professor of psychology at the University of Tartu, Estonia. He is founding editor of Papers on Social Representations and board member of several scholarly journals. As a social scientists he has been expert consultant to the European Union’s DG XII and panel member for European Research Council. He is known for his contribution to the Theory of Social Representations, Societal psychology, Public understanding of science and psychological essentialism.

== Work ==
In his professional publications, Wolfgang Wagner covers a wide range of social psychological topics that have to do with the interaction of individual and collective processes. Throughout his career Wagner explored the mechanisms involved in the individual vs. cultural vs. social interface in modern and in more traditional societies. In doing so he attempted to integrate Social Cognition, Social Constructionism, Discourse Theory, and Social Representations Theory.

=== Social Representation Theory ===
Social Representation Theory is an approach that bridges the traditional divide between the individual and the collective in psychology and the social sciences. The theory was first presented by Serge Moscovici in 1961. Wagner took up this thread of ideas and illustrated the theory’s cornerstones in empirical studies. The theory and its development are summarized in Wagner & Hayes’ 2005 monograph.

With regard to knowledge systems Wagner theorizes that people have access to others’ representational systems to enable concerted interaction even and particularly in cases of conflict. Hence, he suggested the existence of a system of holomorphic or meta-representations that encompass not only an individual's or a group's representation of an issue but also bits and pieces of the adversary's view of the world.

In terms of representational structure Wolfgang Wagner and colleagues showed that the existence of a well-structured representation crucially depends on an ongoing debate or discourse. Even though people do have lots of ideas about a vast range of objects, their ideas will not constitute a well-organized representation in the absence of a pressing situation that triggers extended discourse about a particular issue. Another central tenet of Wagner's thinking is the constructivist unity of a social representation and the social object it constructs. He also popularises social scientific research for the general public like in the interviews in the Estonian weekly SIRP and in the science news portal Novaator

=== Public Understanding of Science and the Theory of Collective Symbolic Coping ===
Serge Moscovici's research on how psychoanalytic theory was received in the French public was an early approach to Public Understanding of Science. Together with George Gaskell, Martin Bauer, Nicole Kronberger and others Wagner worked on how the European public responded to the introduction of genetically modified organisms, which resulted in a number of key publications

=== Intergroup Psychology ===
Wolfgang Wagner, together with Nicole Kronberger and Peter Holtz, extended the framework of Social Representation Theory by including Psychological Essentialism as a hitherto overlooked representational tool in thinking about natural organisms and social groups. As an outcome of their research on genetic engineering, the authors showed that thinking in terms of essence, that is by attributing living beings a species-specific essence, has the curious consequence that genetic hybrids are perceived as lacking identity and a clear belonging to a natural kind. The hybrid's lack of belonging makes respondents judge them as close to being monsters; a straight continuation of the cultural interpretation of monsters signalling a category confusion. Their Essentialist Theory of Hybrids gives an easy explanation of the frequently observed „yuk-factor“ with regard to genetically modified organisms. This work received the Misumi Award
