= Paris Institute for Advanced Study =

International research center in the field of humanities and social sciences

Coordinates: 48.8516°N 2.3592°E

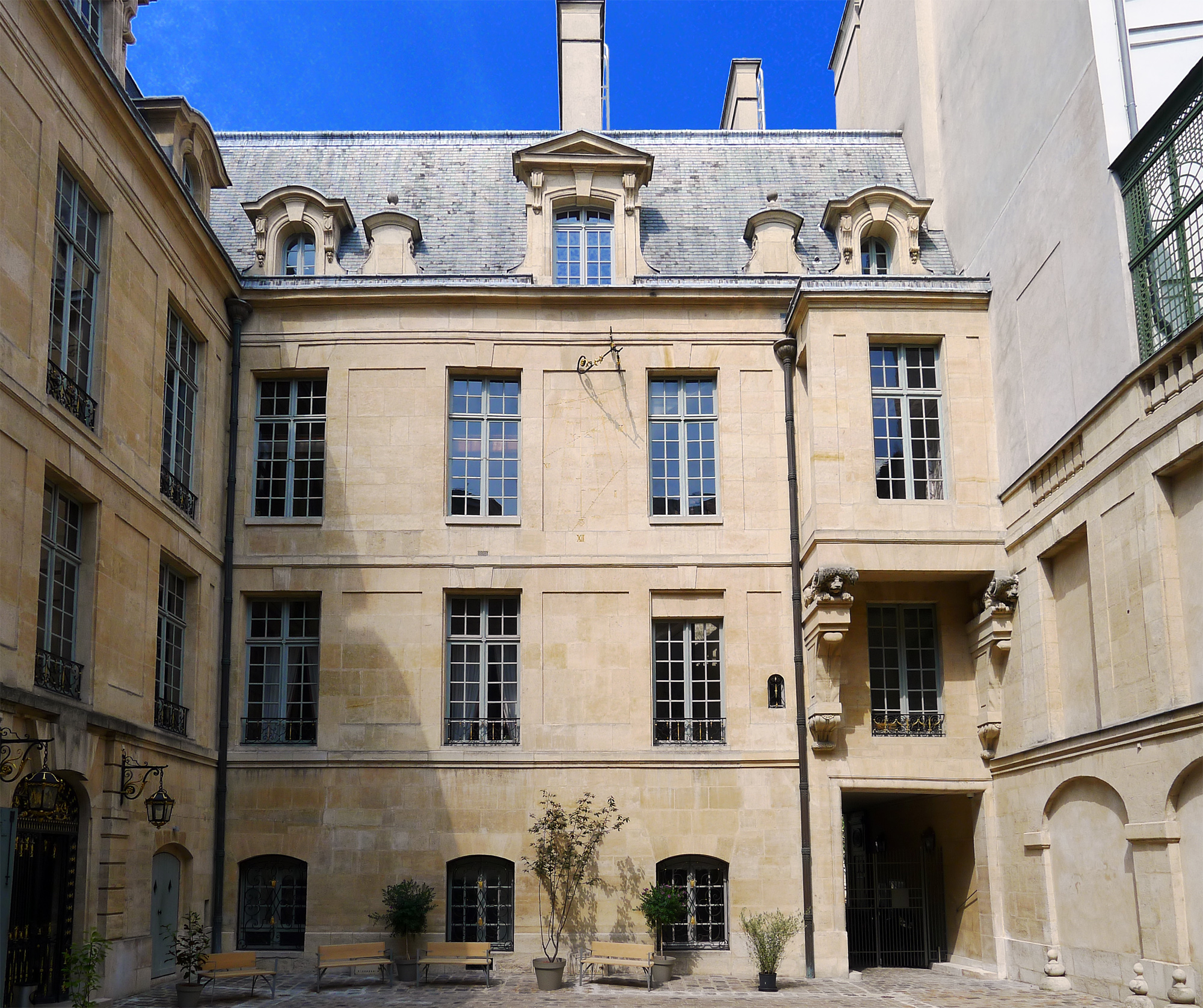
The institute is located at the hôtel de Lauzun, île Saint-Louis, Paris

The Paris Institute for Advanced Study (Paris IAS, or Institut d'études avancées de Paris) is an international research center that offers fellowships to researchers from all over the world in the field of humanities and social sciences. It is also open to other disciplines, in particular the life sciences, for projects in dialogue with the humanities and social sciences. The institute was designed to foster high level research, international and interdisciplinary exchanges and the development of new methods and research objects. The Paris IAS hosts yearly an average of sixty researchers for stays of five to ten months.

Since 2018, the Institute is headed by Saadi Lahlou, statistician, economist, professor of social psychology at the London School of Economics and Political Science (LSE), and member of the French Academy of Technologies and the Academia Europaea. Sociologist Dominique Schnapper chaired the Board of Directors for two terms and was replaced on June 29, 2022, by Bettina Laville [archive], Honorary State Councilor and founder and honorary president of Comité 21.

The Paris IAS is a member of the French network of Institutes for Advanced Study (RFIEA) and the European network of Institutes for Advanced Studies (NetIAS).

== History ==
The Paris IAS was founded in 2008 by the Foundation Maison des Sciences de l'Homme de Paris (FMSH), in collaboration with the École des Hautes Études en Sciences sociales (EHESS) and the École normale supérieure (ENS Paris). It was inspired by the Princeton Institute for Advanced Study, founded in 1930, which counted as its fellows well known researchers such as Albert Einstein, Kurt Gödel or Clifford Geertz, and who served as a model for similar IAS that were subsequently created all over the world. The Paris IAS became an autonomous institution in 2011, supported by the City of Paris and the Île-de-France Regional authority, the French Ministry for Higher education and Research, as well as Universities and research institutions of the Paris area.

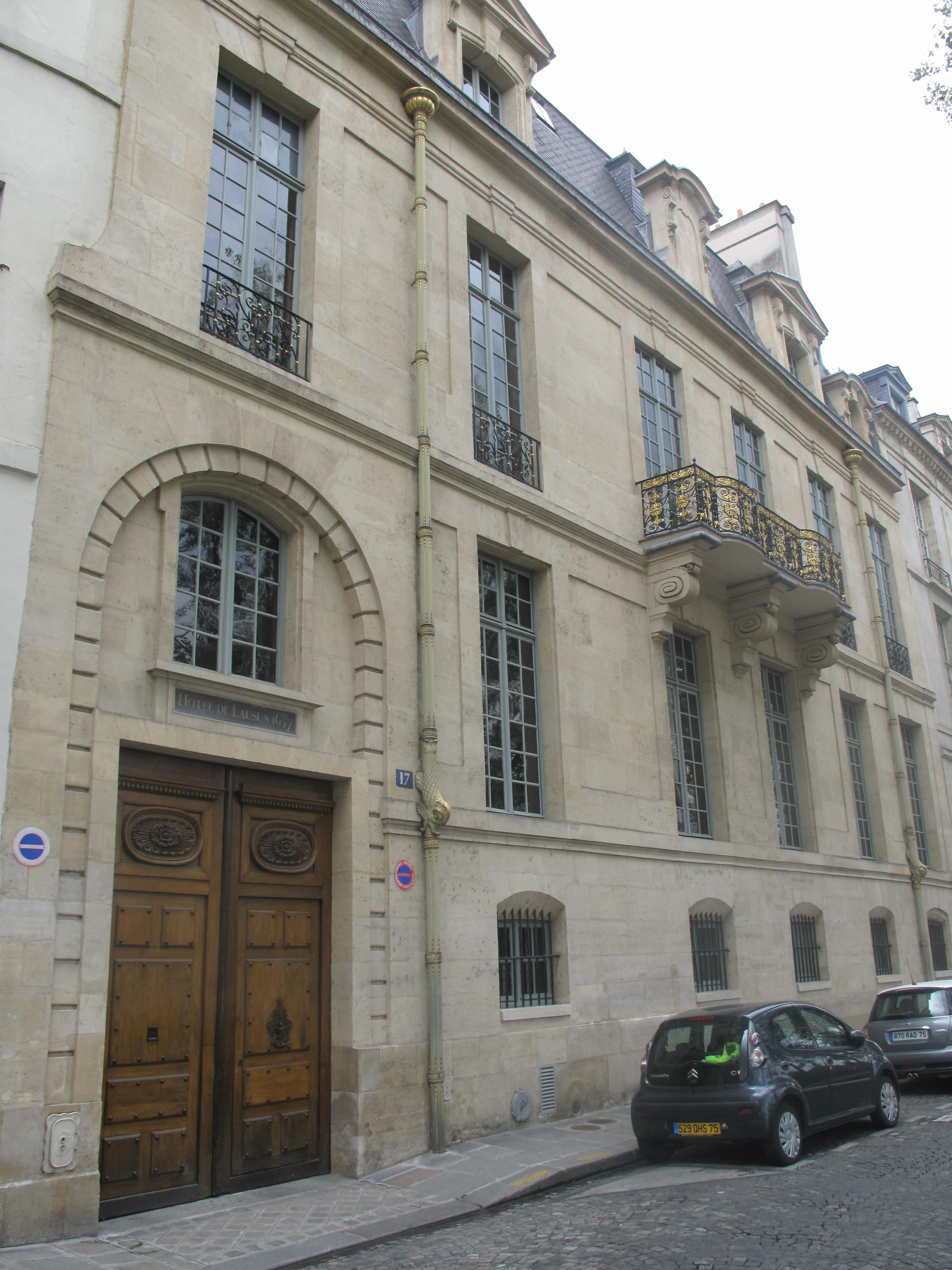

Since 2013, Paris IAS has been located at the hôtel de Lauzun, a 17th-century "hôtel particulier", made available to it by the City of Paris. Researchers in residence have access to offices and rooms for organizing conferences and symposiums and are accommodated at the Cité Internationale Universitaire de Paris.

== Activity and Fellows ==
Each year, the Paris IAS welcomes an average of sixty researchers for various types of stays ranging from a few weeks to ten months.

Since 2008, the Paris IAS has hosted 470 residents of 65 different nationalities from 300 institutions, representing a total of 26 disciplines. More than 880 events have been organized at the Institute and more than 1,100 scientific publications have been recorded at the end of these residencies.

Resident researchers conduct research projects covering all disciplines in the humanities and social sciences, such as anthropology, history, philosophy, sociology, literature, history of science, political science, and many others. The research projects carried out at the Institute are characterized by an interdisciplinary approach and the development of new methodologies and areas of research.

The Paris Institute for Advanced Study offers several types of stays, both long (5 to 10 months) and short (CAT Program, Paris IAS Ideas, PostGenAI@Paris, etc.). Several thematic programs are also offered, such as the program created by Gretty Mirdal, director of the Paris IAS from 2012 to 2018, dedicated to neuroscience.

Residents and partner institutions of the Institute organize around a hundred symposiums and conferences annually on its premises, sometimes addressing major societal issues.

Applications for residency are subject to an evaluation process that meets the standards of the European Research Council (ERC). Residents have included Aušrinė Armonaitė, Jeremy Adelman, Jennifer Boittin, Angela Creager, Lorraine Daston, Robert Darnton, Jean Decety, Christelle Fischer-Bovet, Itzhak Fried, Cécile Fromont, Beatrice de Gelder, Sheldon Garon, Gerd Gigerenzer, Patrick Haggard, James D. Hollan, Edwin Hutchins, Giandomenico Iannetti, Colin Jones, Adam Kahane, Michèle Lamont, Mark Lilla, Michael A. Livermore, Leonardo López Luján, Lauri Mälksoo, Michael Nylan, Daniel Pauly, Eva Pils, Barry Rogers, Sophia Rosenfeld Elizabeth Spelke and Martin Stokhof.

== Members and Partnerships ==
The Paris IAS is supported by the Mairie de Paris, the Île-de-France Regional Authority, the French Ministry for Higher Education and Research, as well as Universities and research institutions of the Paris area:

- Sorbonne University
- University of Paris III: Sorbonne Nouvelle
- Paris 1 Panthéon Sorbonne University
- Paris Cité University
- Gustave Eiffel University
- Paris Nanterre University
- University of Paris-Saclay
- School for Advanced Studies in the Social Sciences (EHESS)
- Ecole pratique des hautes études (EPHE)
- Ecole normale supérieure (Paris)
- Fondation Maison des Sciences de l'Homme (FMSH)
- Inalco
- INRAE
- CNRS

The Paris IAS benefits from the support of the "France 2030" program through the RFIEA+ Laboratory of Excellence, and is also a member of the European Network of Institutes for Advanced Study (NetIAS), a network promoting dialogue and cooperation between European institutes for advanced study. The Institute participates in the French Institute for Advanced Study (FIAS) program, funded by the European Union’s Marie Sklodowska-Curie Action as part of the Horizon 2020 research and innovation program, as well as by major international research foundations.
