= Gretty Mirdal =

Emeritus Professor of Psychology

Gretty Mizrahi Mirdal (born Gretty Kazes) is emeritus Professor of Psychology at the University of Copenhagen, and the former director of the Paris Institute for Advanced Study, the PIAS . Presently she directs the "Brain, Culture and Society" programme at the PIAS, and she continues her research activities at the University of Copenhagen and the Royal Danish Academy for Sciences and Letters.

== Biography ==
She was born and grew up in Istanbul, Turkey, but has lived all her adult life in Denmark. After graduating from high school in Istanbul, she went to the US, and received a B.A. degree at Smith College, Northampton, Mass. She did her post-graduate work and clinical training at the University of Copenhagen. She holds a Doctor of Philosophy degree form the University of Copenhagen, and she is licensed in both clinical and health psychology by the Danish Psychological Association.

== Academic career ==
Her research and teaching have centred mainly on the areas of psychosomatics, post-traumatic stress, and migration psychology. She has done research on the long-term impact of migration and transcultural integration on mental and physical health, and on the psychological treatment of chronic disease. She has been affiliated with the Psychology Department of the University of Copenhagen throughout her career, and has worked as guest researcher in hospital departments, mainly at the University Hospital (Rigshospitalet) in Copenhagen. She was the director of the Paris Institute for Advanced Study from 2012 to 2018. She has chaired the section for Humanities and Social Sciences for the Synergy Grants of the European Research Council; the Standing Committee for the Humanities of the European Science Foundation; the European Research Council’s Panel on "The human mind and its complexity"; the committee for Junior Researchers of the Institut Universitaire de France; the Scientific Committee for the programmes of basic research in the humanities at the National Research Agency, (ANR). She has also been a member of the board of the Danish National Research Foundation (which grants centres of excellence), and of the Scientific Council of the CNRS (Centre National de la Recherche Scientifique). She is presently member of the supervisory board of the FMSH (Fondation Maison des Sciences de l'Homme) and of the Faculty for the Social and Human Sciences of the Université de Paris.

She is a fellow of the Royal Danish Academy of Sciences and Letters and Officier de l'Ordre des Palmes Académiques.
