= Saadi Lahlou =

Social psychologist

Saadi Lahlou (born 1960) is Professor in Social Psychology, in the Department of Psychological and Behavioural Science at the London School of Economics. He conducts and publishes research in the areas of social psychology, consumer behaviour, survey and forecast methods, lexical analysis, cognition and design. He is the Director of the Paris Institute for Advanced Study

== Biography ==
Saadi Lahlou graduated as statistician and economist at the ENSAE in Paris. He obtained his PhD in social psychology at EHESS with Serge Moscovici, and his HDR (habilitation as a research director) at University of Provence with Jean-Claude Abric. He also holds degrees in Human Biology and Ethology.

He directed the research department on consumer studies at CREDOC – Centre for the Study of Lifestyles and Social Policies, in Paris (1987-1993). He was the head of a research unit on organizations at Électricité de France (EDF) (1993-1997). He founded the Laboratory of Design for Cognition at EDF R&D, which he directed until 2009.

In parallel, he continued his basic research in social psychology and cognitive science at the Laboratoire de Psychologie Sociale at EHESS, where he held research seminars (1998-2010); as scientific director of the Cognitive Technologies program at Fondation Maison des sciences de l'homme since 1998 and as associate CNRS research director at Edgar Morin Centre from CNRS-EHESS. He founded and coordinated the RUFAE network (Research on User-Friendly Augmented Environments).

He joined the Institute of Social Psychology at the London School of Economics in January 2009 (now Department of Psychological and Behavioural Science), and was head of the Department from 2009 to 2013. He is a chartered member of (British Psychological Society), and a EURIAS senior fellow. Since 2018, he is the director of the Paris Institute for Advanced Study. He was elected member of the National Academy of Technologies of France (2022) and of the Academia Europaea (2023).

== Research ==
His first social science research was a reconsideration of Durkheim’s Suicide, conducted under the supervision of Christian Baudelot

He studied facial mimics of newborns in the CNRS-INSERM research unit of Michel Jouvet.

At CREDOC (Research Center for Lifestyles and Social Policies, Paris), his research mainly focused on consumer behaviour, especially on eating, and social representations theory. His book Penser Manger published by PUF received the prix Trémolières decerned by Institut Benjamin Delessert. His book was reviewed by Sciences Humaines and by the American Psychological Association.

He set up large statistical observation instruments (such as the Observatoire des Consommations Alimentaires, now part of Agence nationale de sécurité sanitaire), contributed to the development of automated text analysis and to the application of multivariate analysis methods to behavioral and cultural studies.

When he joined EDF R&D in 1993, he conducted organizational studies, developed video observation techniques, especially the "subcam", a wearable miniature video-camera included in glasses, providing a detailed first-person recording of the subject's activity and design approaches. He is deeply concerned by the cognitive effects of digitalization : cognitive overload syndrom, privacy issues and transferring human experience

He has been involved in two main projects concerning sustainability issues : Barenergy, a European project which try to understand the "Barriers for energy changes" and another on Energy use and the built environment which lead to the publication of a collective book, System Innovation for Sustainability 4.

His current research focuses on the distribution of determinants of human behaviour between the physical space, mental space, and social space. He has published a book on this topic, entitled "Installation Theory: The Societal Construction and Regulation of Behaviour". This work provides researchers and practitioners with a simple and powerful framework to understand, analyse, and change behaviour. Informed by a wide range of empirical evidence, it includes an accessible synthesis of former theories (ecological psychology, activity theory, situated action, distributed cognition, social constructionism, actor-network theory and social representations).

Lahlou's work defines "installations" as the familiar, socially constructed, apparatuses which elicit, enable, scaffold and control - and make predictable - most of our 'normal' behaviour. From shower-cabins or airport check-ins to family dinners, classes or hospitals. Installations consist of a set of components that simultaneously support and socially control individual behaviour. Installation Theory describes their threefold structure with a model enabling systematic and practical analysis of their components The components are distributed over the physical space (affordances), the subject (embodied competences) and the social space (institutions, enacted and enforced by other subjects). These components assemble at the time and place the activity is performed. Installation Theory details the mechanisms of their construction, resilience and evolution. Installation Theory is designed to inform intervention on social systems for behavioural change and business model betterment.”

== Publications ==
Books and special issues by Saadi Lahlou:

- (2017) LAHLOU, S., Installation Theory: The societal construction and regulation of behaviour. Cambridge: Cambridge University Press.
- (2012) LAHLOU, S., NOSULENKO, Valery, SAMOYLENKO, Elena. Numériser le travail. Théories, méthodes et expérimentations. Paris : Lavoisier. 327p.
- (2010) LAHLOU, S. (ed.). System Innovation for Sustainability 4: Case Studies in Sustainable Consumption and Production - Energy Use and the Built Environment. Sheffield: Greenleaf, 2010. 288p. (Chapters by S. Lahlou A. Tukker, M. Charter & T. Woolman; H. Szejnwald-Brown & P. J. Vergragt; R. Wimmer & M.J. Kang; R. Wuestenhagen; J. P. Thorp; I. Kaltenegger & A. Tisch; V. Loftness, V. Hartkopf, A. Aziz, M. Snyder, J. Choi & X. Yang; C. Fischer; F.Reusswig, S. Lorek, D. & D. Fuchs). ISBN 978-1906093259
- (2010) LAHLOU, S. NOSULENKO, V. (guest eds) Digitize and Transfer. Social Science Information. 49 (3): 291 – 507. (Papers by Lewis Pea & Rosen, Garcia-Lorenzo, Habert & Huc, Cordelois, Ganascia, Barabanschikov, Le Bellu, Lahlou & Nosulenko, 216 p.).
- (2009) LAHLOU, S. (ed). Designing User Friendly Augmented Work Environments. London: Springer. Computer Supported Cooperative Work Series, Nov. 2009. 347p. (Chapters by : Stanford (B. Johansson, A. Fox, T. Winograd.), UC San Diego (E. Hutchins, J. Hollan), Carnegie-Mellon (V. V. Loftness, V. Hartkopf, A. Aziz.), Swedish Royal Inst. of Technology (C. G. Jansson.), U. Aachen (J. Borchers), Russian Acad. Sc (Nosulenko & Samoylenko), Xerox Palo-Alto (M. Back, G. Golovchinsky, P. Qvarfordt, W. van Melle, J. Boreczky, T. Dunnigan, S. Carter); EDF R&D (Lahlou). ISBN 978-1848000971.
- (2008) LAHLOU, S. NOSULENKO, V. (guest eds) Cognitive Technologies. Social Science Information. September 2008; 47 (3): 227 - 457 (Papers by Lahlou, Joore, Vertegall and Shell, Lenay, Pea Lindgren and Rosen, Beaudouin, Nosulenko, Alexandrov: 230 p.)
- (2000) LAHLOU, S. (sous la coord de.): Technologies Cognitives et environnement de travail., Intellectica, 30, 2000/1. (Articles de D. Kirsh, E. Hutchins, S. Lahlou, A.V. Cicourel, C. Heath P. Luff G. Nicholls D. vom Lehn, W.E. Mackay, M. Zacklad : 222 p.)
- (1998) LAHLOU, S. Penser manger. Alimentation et représentations sociales. Paris : P.U.F., 1998. 239p. (Prix Trémolières 1998). ISBN 978-2130491361.
- (1992) - LAHLOU, S., Van der MEIJDEN, R., MESSU, M., POQUET, G., PRAKKE, F., SAND, F. A Guideline for Survey Techniques in Evaluation Research. Brussels: Commission of European Communities. EUR 14-339. ISBN 92-826-4093-0
