= Hart Blanton =

American psychologist

Hart Blanton is an American social psychologist. He is a professor in the department of communication and journalism at Texas A&M University. He earned his Ph.D. in psychology from Princeton University in 1994.

== Research ==
Blanton is known for his contributions to the field of social comparison, social influence and has also conducted research on implicit attitudes. He is recognized for authoring Deviance Regulation Theory and psychometric analysis of the Implicit Association Test.
