= List of social psychology theories =

Social psychology utilizes a wide range of specific theories for various kinds of social and cognitive phenomena. Here is a sampling of some of the more influential theories that can be found in this branch of psychology.

- Attribution theory – is concerned with the ways in which people explain (or attribute) the behaviour of others. The theory divides the way people attribute causes to events into two types. External or "situational" attributions assign causality to an outside factor, such as the weather. Internal or "dispositional" attributions assign causality to factors within the person, such as ability or personality.
- Cognitive dissonance – was originally based on the concept of cognitive consistency, but is now more related to self-concept theory. When people do something that violates their view of themselves, this causes an uncomfortable state of dissonance that motivates a change in either attitudes or behaviour (Festinger, 1957).
- Drive theory – posits that the presence of an audience causes arousal which creates dominant or typical responses in the context of the situation.
- Elaboration likelihood model – maintains that information processing, often in the case of a persuasion attempt can be divided into two separate processes based on the "likelihood of cognitive elaborations," that is, whether people think critically about the content of a message, or respond to superficial aspects of the message and other immediate cues.
- Motivation crowding theory – suggests that extrinsic motivators such as monetary incentives or punishments can undermine (or, under different conditions, strengthen) intrinsic motivation.
- Observational learning (social learning) – suggests that behaviour can be acquired by observation and imitation of others, unlike traditional learning theories which require reinforcement or punishment for learning to occur.
- Positioning theory – focuses on the moral orders that occur in conversations as a result of the interplay between the speech-acts uttered, the positions taken and the developing story-line.
- Schemata theory – focuses on "schemas" which are cognitive structures that organize knowledge and guide information processing. They take the form of generalized beliefs that can operate automatically and lead to biases in perception and memory.
- Self-determination theory – is an organismic theory of behavior and personality development that is particularly concerned with how social-contextual factors support or thwart people's intrinsic motivation, social integration, and well-being through the respective satisfaction or deprivation of posited basic psychological needs for competence, autonomy, and relatedness
- Self-perception theory – emphasizes that we observe ourselves in the same manner that we observe others, and draw conclusions about our likes and dislikes. Extrinsic self perceptions can lead to the over-justification effect.
- Self-verification theory – focuses on people’s desire to be known and understood by others. The key assumption is that once people develop firmly held beliefs about themselves, they come to prefer that others see them as they see themselves.
- Social comparison theory – suggests that humans gain information about themselves, and make inferences that are relevant to self-esteem, by comparison to relevant others.
- Social exchange theory – is an economic social theory that assumes human relationships are based on rational choice and cost-benefit analyses. If one partner's costs begin to outweigh his or her benefits, that person may leave the relationship, especially if there are good alternatives available.
- Social identity theory – was developed by Henri Tajfel and examines how categorizing people (including oneself) into ingroups or outgroups affects perceptions, attitudes, and behavior.
- Social representation theory - was developed by Serge Moscovici and concerns the character of the shared beliefs and practices that typify any collective.
- Social penetration theory – proposes that, as relationships develop, interpersonal communication moves from relatively shallow, non-intimate levels to deeper, more intimate ones. The theory was formulated by psychologists Irwin Altman and Dalmas Taylor in 1973 to provide an understanding of the closeness between two individuals.
- Socioemotional selectivity theory – posits that as people age and their perceived time left in life decreases, they shift from focusing on information seeking goals to focusing on emotional goals.
- System justification theory – proposes that people have a motivation to defend and bolster the status quo, in order to continue believing that their social, political, and economic systems are legitimate and just.
- Terror management theory – suggests that human mortality causes existential dread and terror, and that much of human behavior exists as a buffer against this dread (e.g., self-esteem and worldviews).
- Triangular theory of love – by Sternberg, characterizes love in an interpersonal relationship on three different scales: intimacy, passion, and commitment. Different stages and types of love can be categorized by different combinations of these three elements.
