= Deviance regulation theory =

Sociological theory

Deviance regulation theory (DRT) posits that people choose to stray from social norms in socially attractive ways as well as avoiding socially unattractive behaviors that stray from social norms. These actions are all performed in an effort to preserve a constructive private and public self-image. DRT was proposed by Hart Blanton at the University of Albany in 2003 and has various applications in behavior change including alcohol interventions, inducing creativity, and other uses that are briefly mentioned below. Limitations to this theory have yet to be discovered but with future research Blanton and Christie are sure that boundaries are to be found.

== Theory ==
Deviance regulation theory (DRT) builds upon past research on causal attribution, self-representation, social comparison, person perception, and social prototypes. These areas of research focus on identity and actions separately. In DRT, deviance is defined strictly as a divergence from a norm, lacking any negative connotation that the term deviance commonly holds in psychology. Deviance regulation theory links actions and identities to explain and predict adherence to, and deviance from, normative action based on identity pursuit. This is a somewhat narrow scope because application is limited to situations where identity concerns are predominant.

DRT relies on a dual-motivational system to explain the pursuit of identity within reference groups. On one side of the system, motivation comes from the avoidance of negative self-views. In a reference group where a behavior is required of its members, the members of the reference group will internalize the group mentality. If an individual were to deviate from the normative behavior, they would then develop negative self-views. So in order to protect their positive self-regard, individuals are motivated to avoid deviating from the normative behavior.

On the other side of the dual-motivational system, in a reference group where a behavior deviating from the norm is desirable but not required of its members, members of the group would regard the deviant act as an ideal. In this scenario, an individual is motivated to deviate from the norm because doing so will raise their esteem within the reference group and will elevate their level of positive self-regard.

In both schemes, deviance from or adherence to a normative act is guided by identity pursuit. In the first scheme behavior was guided by the preservation of positive identity through the avoidance of negative self-regard; and in the second scheme, behavior was guided by the pursuit of positive identity. Which motivation will guide behavior will depend on the context within reference groups and individual variance, although avoidance of negative identity seems to be a more pungent motivator. In the first example the negative self-views would come from ideas of social obligation. Not meeting the minimum requirements of the social obligation leads to feelings of exclusion which is why it can be a very powerful motivator. Positive identity pursuit gives motivation to exhibit what Blanton and Christie referred to as "optional ideals". Meeting minimums for social inclusion seems to be a more pressing influence over behavior than exhibiting ideal (but not required) behavior, especially when individual abilities and interests are taken into account.

=== Boundary conditions ===
Research by Hart Blanton has not found limitations because the experiments were conducted under circumstances that favored the current theory. Blanton and Christie expect boundary conditions to become evident through future research and may be found to exist in situations where the individual is resistant to change. If an individual makes a conscious effort to resist a reference group's perceived attempt to alter the individual's behavior, it seems plausible that DRT could backfire. The same way that people key off of behavior from ingroups, people also observe and avoid normative behavior displayed by people in outgroups. In this context DRT could play the opposite role as an individual would avoid the observed normative behavior.

Differences in culture could potentially expose another boundary condition. A person's level of self-representation could be a limit of application. Future research could show whether cultural identity would influence the predictive power of deviance regulation theory. It seems intuitive to think that a person who holds a more collective identity (e.g. in eastern culture individuals base more of their identity off of the identity of the success and failure of their collective nation when compared with individuals from western culture) may be influenced differently by motivations relating to identity pursuit than someone who holds an individualistic view of identity.

== Uses ==
Deviance regulation theory is primarily used as an intervention meant to influence behavior through social norms. By framing a message about what behaviors are considered normal in either a positive or negative way, it is possible to influence individuals to either engage or abstain from those behaviors based on the desire to appear as an individual with positive qualities. There are several ways in which a deviance regulation intervention has been and can possibly be used:

=== Alcohol interventions ===
Among the uses of deviance regulation interventions, the regulation of alcohol use, especially among college students, is perhaps the most prevalent. Interventions involving conformity are particularly relevant in the case of college drinking due to the tendency of college students to overestimate the amount of alcohol consumed by their peers, as well as projection, or the tendency for individuals to view their peer's drinking habits as similar to their own, causing them to see their own alcohol use as normal. Furthermore, a deviance regulation intervention makes sense among this population due to college often being a time of identity development, and because many see drinking as an integral part of the college experience could serve as a behavior with which to establish an identity.

One way deviance regulation interventions have been used to control alcohol consumption is by increasing the use of protective behavioral strategies. Protective behavioral strategies (PBS) are methods that an individual can employ in order to limit the consequences of alcohol use, and include limiting the number of drinks consumed in a session, moderating the manner of drinking, and serious harm reduction, such as having a designated driver. It was found that individuals who believed the use of PBS was high were most influenced by a negative message about those who do not use PBS and that individuals who believed PBS use was low were more influenced by a positive message about those who use PBS. However, this held true only for the manner of drinking strategy, and only influenced behavior when the subject believed in the message.

=== Creativity interventions ===
Deviance regulation interventions have also been used to influence creativity. This was done by manipulating self guides, which are internalized evaluative standards developed through socialization. There are two types of self guides: ought self-guides, which are representative of attributes that are socially desirable and are performed out of a sense of obligation or social obligation or responsibility, and Ideal self guides, which represent attributes formed more from the individual's desires and personal ambitions. Both of these self-guides are associated with distinct motivational orientations. Ought self-guides, which focus on attributes typically taught through punishment, lead to a prevention-focus, or the avoidance of unwanted outcomes. Conversely, ideal self-guides, which are developed through praise and admiration, lead to a promotion-focus, or the desire to achieve positive outcomes.

It has been generally observed that individuals high in promotion-focus are more likely to show flexible and creative thinking patterns. Therefore, researchers believed that situations that activate promotion-focus should result in greater creativity. It was found that those who put a high emphasis on social obligation had less desire to be creative, and therefore manipulation of the salience of ought self-guides inhibited creative output while manipulation of ideal self-guides increased creative output. Furthermore, priming of promotion-focus lead subjects led to more novel answers on a word association test. However, it is believed that these results came from an increase in creative expression, not creative ability, as the boost to creative output vanished among speeded trials.

=== Other uses ===
A deviance regulation intervention has been used in various other scenarios in order to encourage flu immunization, condom use, as well as prospectively for the discouragement of cigarette smoke.
