= Social representation =

System of ideas establishing social order

Social representations are a system of values, ideas, metaphors, beliefs, and practices that serve to establish social order, orient participants and enable communication among the members of groups and communities. Social representation theory is a body of theory within social psychology and sociological social psychology. It has parallels in sociological theorizing such as social constructionism and symbolic interactionism, and is similar in some ways to mass consensus and discursive psychology.

== Origin and definition ==
The term social representation was originally coined by Serge Moscovici in 1961, in his study on the reception and circulation of psychoanalysis in France. It is understood as the collective elaboration "of a social object by the community for the purpose of behaving and communicating". They are further referred to as "system of values, ideas and practices with a twofold function; first, to establish an order which will enable individuals to orient themselves in their material and social world and to master it; and secondly to enable communication to take place among the members of a community by providing them with a code for social exchange and a code for naming and classifying unambiguously the various aspects of their world and their individual and group history". In his study, Moscovici sought to investigate how scientific theories circulate within common sense, and what happens to these theories when they are elaborated upon by a lay public. For such analysis, Moscovici postulated two universes: the reified universe of science, which operates according to scientific rules and procedures and gives rise to scientific knowledge, and the consensual universe of social representation, in which the lay public elaborates and circulates forms of knowledge which come to constitute the content of common sense.

Moscovici's pioneering study described how three segments of French society in the 1950s, i.e. the urban-liberal, the Catholic, and the communist milieus, responded to the challenge of psychoanalytic ideas. Moscovici found that communication processes, the contents, and their consequences differed across the three social segments. Moscovici identified propaganda as the typical communication of the communist milieu, whereby communication is ordered systematically emphasising incompatibility and conflict. The intention is to generate negative stereotypes. Propagation was the typical form of the Catholic segment, identified as didactic and well-ordered but with the intention to make limited concessions to a subgroup of Catholics with affinities to psychoanalysis, and simultaneously, to set limits to the acceptance within the established orthodoxy of the Church. Diffusion was typical of urban-liberal milieus, whereby communication was merely intended to inform people about new opportunities, with little resistance to psychoanalysis.

== Anchoring and objectification ==
Moscovici described two main processes by which the unfamiliar is made familiar: anchoring and objectification. Anchoring involves the ascribing of meaning to new phenomena – objects, relations, experiences, practices, etc. – by means of integrating it into existing worldviews, so it can be interpreted and compared to the "already known". In this way, the threat that the strange and unfamiliar object poses is being erased. In the process of objectification something abstract is turned into something almost concrete.

Social representations, therefore, are depicted as both the process and the result of social construction. In the socio-cognitive activity of representation that produces representations, social representations are constantly converted into a social reality while continuously being re-interpreted, re-thought, re-presented.

Moscovici's theorisation of social representations was inspired by Émile Durkheim's notion of collective representations. The change from collective representations to social representations has been brought about by the societal conditions of modernity.

== Interpretation and developments ==
Social representations should neither be equated with relatively stable collective representations, nor should they be confused with individual, cognitive representations. This has been elaborated by several authors who contributed to the theory: Gerard Duveen and Barbara Lloyd emphasized the articulation of the individual and the collective in micro-genetic processes of socialization, Wolfgang Wagner theorized about the role of action and social interaction in the construction of social representations, and Sandra Jovchelovitch proposed to regard social representations as a space in-between, at the cross-roads between the individual and society that is the public sphere, that links objects, subjects and activities. Most authors agree that social representations are dynamic elements of knowledge that depend on social conflict and dispute to originate and that have a history of elaboration and change over time. Bauer & Gaskell integrate this view in their formal model relating three elements: subjects, or carriers of the representation; an object, activity, or idea that is represented; and a project of a social group within which the representation makes sense. This conceptualisation is known as the toblerone model of social representations.

There have been various developments within the field since Moscovici's original proposition of the theory. Jean-Claude Abric and his colleagues have explored the structural elements of social representations, distinguishing between core and peripheral elements in terms of the centrality and stability of certain beliefs. This approach has come to be known as the central nucleus theory. Denise Jodelet explored the emotional and symbolic aspects of social representations and their manifestation in everyday practices, Saadi Lahlou explores the relations between social representations and behavior, focusing on eating representations and consumer behaviour. Other important developments have been made by Caroline Howarth in linking Social identity theory with the theory of social representations, by Gerard Duveen in elaborating developmental aspects in relation to the micro-genesis of social representations of gender, by Janos Laszlo and Michael Murray in linking narrative psychology with social representation theory and by Wolfgang Wagner in fathoming the relationship between discursive processes, collective behaviour patterns and the construction of social representations.

== Status and prevalence ==
Despite its long history, social representation theory is popular mainly among European social psychologists. Two of the classic works in the realm of this theory include Moscovici's own seminal work on representations of psychoanalysis in France, and Denise Jodelet's exemplary study of the social representation of madness. However, the theory is far from being a settled doctrine as it attracts ongoing debate and controversy from both social representationists and other theorists. The theory is less known in the United States, partly because much of Moscovici's original work has been published in French.

== Application ==
There is increasing use of social representation theory to explore popular understanding of everyday phenomena. One area of research is popular understandings of health and illness. This can be traced back to early work by Claudine Herzlich and Denise Jodelet.. This was extended by work by Uwe Flick, Hélène Joffe, Michael Murray and others. There has also been work on social representations of environmental issues, education, gender violence and many other issues.

== Bibliography ==
- Contarello, A. (Ed.) (2023). Embracing change. Knowledge, continuity and social representations. Oxford: Oxford University Press.
- Gillespie, A. (2008) Social representations, alternative representations and semantic barriers . Journal for the Theory of Social Behaviour 38, 4, 376–391.
- Moscovici, Serge (2000). Social representations: Explorations in Social Psychology. Wiley.
- Moscovici, S. (1988). "Notes towards a description of social representations". European Journal of Social Psychology. 18 (3): 211–250. doi:10.1002/ejsp.2420180303.
- Moscovici, S. (1984). "The phenomenon of social representations". Social Representations: 3–69.
- Sammut, Gordon; Howarth, Caroline (2014). "Social representations". In Teo, Thomas (ed.). Encyclopedia of Critical Psychology. New York, NY: Springer. pp. 1799–1802. doi:10.1007/978-1-4614-5583-7. ISBN 978-1-4614-5582-0.
- Sammut, G., Andreouli, E., Gaskell, G., & Valsiner, J. (eds.) (2015). The Cambridge Handbook of Social Representations. Cambridge: Cambridge University Press.
- Wagner, W., Duveen, G., Farr, R., Jovchelovitch, S., et al. (1999) Theory and Method of Social Representations. Asian Journal of Social Psychology, 2, 95–125.
- Wagner, W. & Hayes, N. (2005). Everyday Discourse and Common Sense-The Theory of Social Representations. New York, NY: Palgrave Macmillan.

== See also ==
- Cognitive polyphasia
- Collective memory
- Social construction of reality
- Crowd psychology
- Societal psychology
- Underrepresented group
- List of social psychology theories
