= Marilynn Brewer =

American psychologist

Marilynn B. Brewer is an American social psychologist. She is professor emeritus of psychology at Ohio State University and resides in New South Wales. She was formerly Professor of Psychology and Director of the Institute for Social Science Research at UCLA.

== Biography ==
In 1942, Brewer was born in Chicago, Illinois as Marilynn Bolt. In 1966, she married Robert Brewer. Her parents both did not attend college but encouraged her to pursue her education. Brewer received her Bachelors of Arts in Social Sciences in 1963 from North Park College with honors. She was greatly influenced and encouraged by her mentor, Jean Driscoll. Brewer received a National Institute of Mental Health fellowship to fund her graduate education at Northwestern University, where she received a Ph.D. in 1968.

Brewer was President of the American Psychological Society from 1993 to 1995, Midwestern Psychological Association in 2004, the Society for the Psychological Study of Social Issues in 1984–1985, and the Society for Personality and Social Psychology from 1990 to 1991. She has also served as editor of Personality and Social Psychological Review and associate editor of Psychological Review.

== Research ==
Brewer is known for her contributions to the field of social identity and has also conducted research in the areas of social cognition and intergroup relations. While she is particularly recognized for her theory of optimal distinctiveness, she has been honored by a variety of organizations for wide-ranging and diverse contributions to the field of social psychology.

== Honors and awards ==
- APA Distinguished Scientific Contribution Award (2007)
- Kurt Lewin Memorial Award (1995)
- Donald T. Campbell Award for Distinguished Research in Social Psychology (1992)
- Society of Experimental Social Psychology Distinguished Scientist Award (2004)
- American Academy of Arts and Sciences Member (2007)
- Elected to the National Academy of Sciences (2026)
