= Hilde Himmelweit =

German-British psychologist

Hildegard Therese Himmelweit
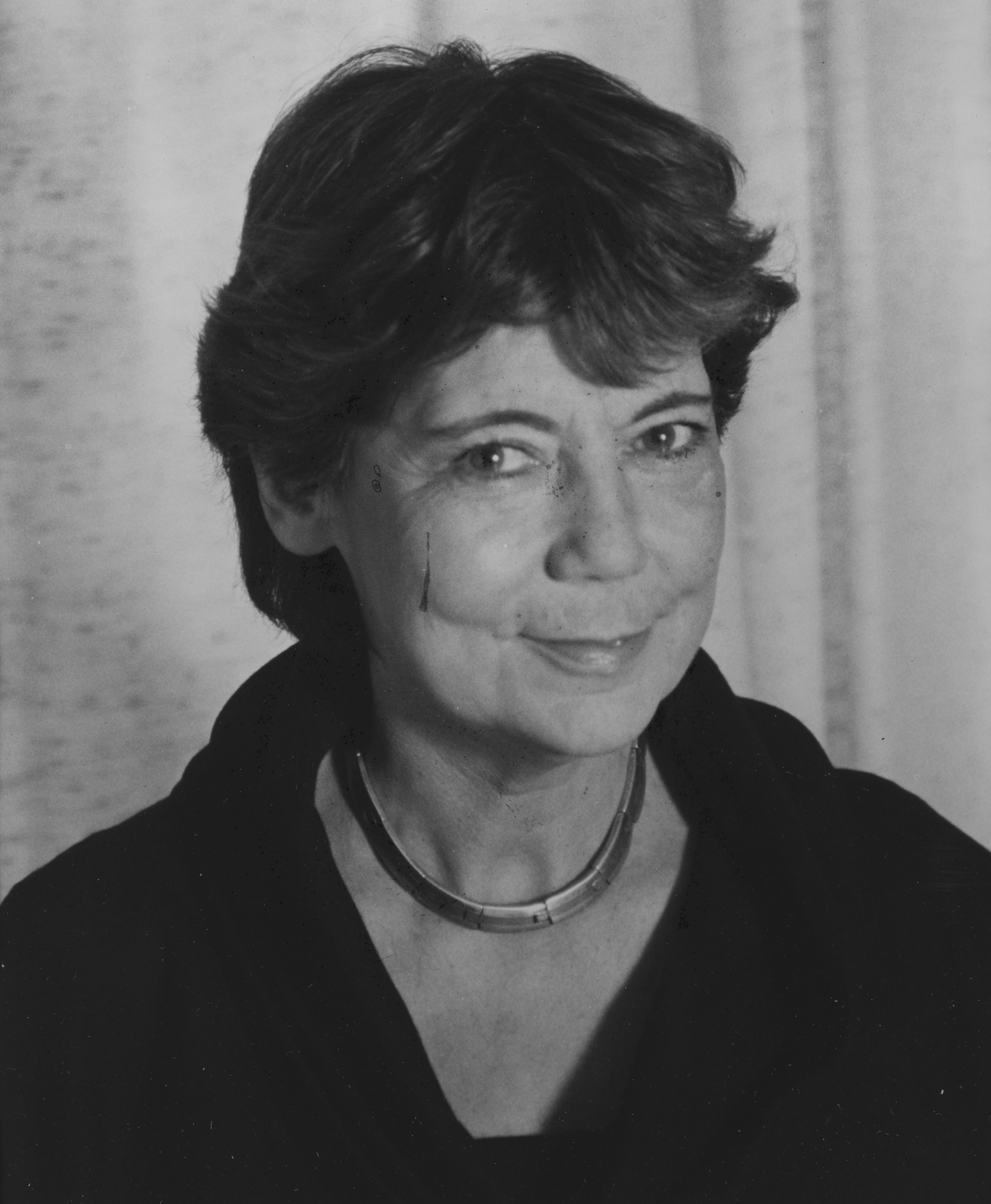
- Born: February 20, 1918; Berlin
- Died: 1989
- Spouse: Freddy Himmelweit
- Children: Susan

Academic background
- Education: University of Cambridge, Institute of Psychiatry
- Thesis: The study of temperament of neurotic persons by means of aspiration tests (1945)

Academic work
- Discipline: Social Psychology
- Institutions: London School of Economics

Hildegard Therese Himmelweit (née Litthauer; 1918–1989) was a German social psychologist who had a major influence on the development of the discipline in Britain.

== Biography ==
Hilde was born in Berlin in 1918. Her father, Dr Siegfried Litthauer, was a chemist and industrialist. She went to Newnham College, Cambridge (1937-1942). She married Freddy Himmelweit. She received her PhD under Hans Eysenck at the Institute of Psychiatry.

She taught at the London School of Economics from 1948 to 1983. From 1964 she was the first Professor of Social Psychology in Britain, founding LSE's social psychology department (now named the Department of Psychological and Behavioural Science) and, in effect, establishing the discipline on the university curriculum. She retired in 1983 and died of cancer in 1989.

== Research ==
She greatly enhanced our understanding of the contemporary world through her research, in particular through two studies. As director of the Nuffield Foundation television inquiry from 1954 to 1958 she contributed to the understanding of television's impact in society, the subsequent book Television and the Child (1958) establishing her reputation in Europe and North America. Her work in the field of political psychology greatly strengthened the understanding of human decision-making by voters as she and her team studied a group of young people over a 15-year period. The study was published as How Voters Decide in 1981. Hilde Himmelweit was also highly influential in advocating a societal psychology, on which topic she co-edited a volume with George Gaskell, as well as in the establishment and development of the theory of social representations.

== Major publications ==
- Himmelweit, H.T., Oppenheim, A.N., & Vince, P. (1958). Television and the child: an empirical study of the effect of television on the young. London: Published for the Nuffield Foundation by Oxford University Press.
- Himmelweit, H.T., Humphreys, P., & Jaeger, M. (1985). How voters decide: a model of vote choice based on a special longitudinal study extending over fifteen years and the British election surveys of 1970-1983. (Revised and updated edition). Milton Keynes: Open University Press.
- Himmelweit, H.T., & Gaskell, G. (Eds). (1990). Societal Psychology: Implications and scope. London: Sage Publications.

== Awards ==
- 1976 - Hon DSc, Open University
- 1981 - Nevitt Sanford Award, International Society of Political Psychology
