= Martin Bauer =

Martin W. Bauer is a Professor of social psychology. He directs the MSc in Social and Public Communication at the Department of Psychological and Behavioural Science at LSE. Martin Bauer was a Research Fellow in 'Public Understanding of Science' at the Science Museum in London, an academic visitor to the Maison des Sciences de l'homme in Paris, and he teaches regularly in Brazil at the Universidade Federal do Rio Grande do Sul and the Pontifícia Universidade Católica do Rio Grande do Sul.

== Biography ==
Bauer was educated at the University of Bern in Switzerland and trained at the London School of Economics. He received his PhD from the London School of Economics in 1993 with a thesis titled "Resistance to change: a functional analysis of responses to technical change in a Swiss bank". He joined the LSE's Institute of Social Psychology and Department of Methodology (formerly Methodology Institute) in September 1994.

== Research and Intellectual Interests ==
Bauer's research portfolio includes the theory of resistance in social processes, Social representations of and public attitudes to science and technology, in particular genomics and modern biotechnology. The key question with which he is concerned is: how does public opinion influence the techno-scientific developments?

Bauer is known for developing the toblerone model of social representations with George Gaskell. He is also known for his edited handbook with George Gaskell, Qualitative Researching with Text, Image and Sound: A Practical Handbook (2000).

== Publications (selection) ==
Books

- Biotechnology - the making of a global controversy (Cambridge, CUP, 2002, with G Gaskell)
- Pesquisa qualitativa con texto, imagem e som (Petropolis Brazil, Editora VOZES, 2002, with G Gaskell)
- Biotechnology 1996-2000 - the years of controversy (London, Science Museum, 2001, with G Gaskell)
- Qualitative researching with text, image and sound - a practical handbook (London, Sage, 2000, with G Gaskell)
- Biotechnology in Public - A European source book (London, Science Museum, 1998; with J Durant & G Gaskell)
- Resistance to new Technology - nuclear power, information technology and biotechnology (Cambridge, CUP, 1995)

Papers and book chapters

Bauer MW (2005) The mass media and the biotechnology controversy, International Journal of Public Opinion Research, 17 (1), 5-22 [special issue]

Bauer MW (2005) Distinguishing GREEN from RED biotechnology - cultivation effects of the elite press, International Journal of Public Opinion Research, 17 (1), 63–89.

Bauer MW, S Howard, V Hagenhoff, G Gasperoni & Maria Rusanen (2005) The BSE and CJD crisis in the press, in: C Dora (ed) Health, Hazard and Public Debate: Lessons for Risk Communication from the BSE/CJD saga, Geneva, WHO, 125-164 [chapter 6].

Dowler E, J Green, MW Bauer, G Gasperoni (2005) Assessing public perceptions: issues and methods, in: C Dora (ed) Health, Hazard and Public Debate: Lessons for Risk Communication from the BSE/CJD saga, Geneva, WHO, 40-60 [chapter 3]

Bauer MW (2004) Long-term trends in public sensitivities about genetic identification: 1973–2002, in: Gardar Árnason and Salvör Nordal (eds) Blood and Data - Ethical, Legal and Social Aspects of Human Genetic Databases, Reykjavik: University of Iceland Press 2004, p143-161 (chapter 16).

Bauer MW (2004) The vicissitudes of 'public understanding of science': from 'literacy' to 'science in society', in: Science meets Society, Lisbon, Gulbenkian Foundation, p37-63.

U Flick & M Bauer (2004) Teaching qualitative research, in: Flick U, E vonKardoff & I Steinke (eds) A Companion to Qualitative Research, London, Sage, 340-49 [translation from German 2000].

Bauer MW (2003) O dominio publico da DNA: tendencies a longo prazo, Ciencia & Ambiente, (UFSM, Rio Grande do Sul) Maio, 129–140.

Gregory J & M W Bauer (2003) CPS INC: l'avenir de la communication de la science, in: B Schiele (ed) Les Nouveaux Territoires de la Culture Scientifique, Montreal, Canada, chapter 3, 41–65.

Bauer MW (2002) Arenas, platforms and the biotechnology movement, Science Communication, 24, 144–161.

Bauer MW (2002) Controversial medical and agri-food biotechnology: a cultivation analysis, Public Understanding of Science, 2, 11, 1–19.

Bauer MW and G Gaskell (2002) The biotechnology movement, in: Bauer MW & G Gaskell (eds) Biotechnology - the making of a global controversy, Cambridge, CUP, 379–404.

Bauer MW & H Bonfadelli (2002) Controversy, media coverage and public knowledge, in: Bauer, MW & G Gaskell (eds) Biotechnology - the making of a global controversy, Cambridge, CUP

With S Howard (2001) Psychology in the Press, 1988 to 1999, The Psychologist, 14 (12), 632-636 [BPS centenary 1901–2001, special media watch].

Bauer MW, M Kohring, J Gutteling & A Allansdottir (2001) The dramatisation of biotechnology in the elite mass media, in: G Gaskell & MW Bauer (eds) Biotechnology 1996-2000 - the years of controversy, London, Science Museum, 35–52.

Bauer MW (2001) Biotechnology: Ethical Framing in the Elite Press, Noticie di Politeia, 17 (63), 51-66 [ISSN 1128-2401].

Bauer MW (2001) "Risiko oder Ethik? Vergleichendes zur Öffentlichkeit der Gentechnik." In: M Weber und P Hoyningen-Huene (Hg.), Ethische Probleme in den Biowissenschaften. Heidelberg, Synchron Wissenschaftsverlag, 149–168.

With Gaskell, N Allum, J Durant et al. (2000) Biotechnology and the European Public, Nature Biotechnology, Sept, Vol 18, 935–38.

Bauer MW, Petkova K, P Boyadjjewa (2000) Public knowledge of and attitudes to science - alternative measures, Science, Technology and Human Values, 25, 1, 30–51.

Bauer MW & B Aarts (2000) Corpus construction: a principle for qualitative data collection, in: Bauer M & G Gaskell (eds) Qualitative researching with text, image and sound: a practical handbook, London, Sage, 19-37

Bauer MW (2000) Analysing noise and music as social data, in: Bauer MW & G Gaskell (eds) Qualitative researching with text, image and sound: a practical handbook, London, Sage, 263–280.

MW Bauer (2000) Classic content analysis: a review, in: Bauer MW & G Gaskell (eds) Qualitative researching with text, image and sound: a practical handbook, London, Sage, 131–151.

Bauer MW (2000) 'Science in the media' as cultural indicator: contextualising surveys with media analysis, in: Dierkes M and C von Grote (eds) Between understanding and trust: the public, science and technology, Reading, Harwood Academics Publisher, 157–178.

Bauer M W and G Gaskell (1999) Towards a paradigm for research on social representations, Journal for the Theory of Social Behaviour, 29 (2), 163–186.

With G Gaskell, J Durant, NC Allum (1999) Worlds apart? The reception of genetically modified food in Europe and the United States, Science, 285, July 15, 1-4 [retracted 9 June 2000].

Bauer M (1998) The medicalisation of science news: from the 'rocket-scalpel' to the 'gene-meteorite' complex, Social Science Information, 37, 731–751. [ISSN 0539-0184]

Bauer M (1998) Die moderne Gentechnik und die oeffentliche Meinung, Civitas, 53, 3/4, 48-55

Bauer M (1998) La longue duree of popular science, 1830–present, In Deveze-Berthet D (ed) La promotion de la culture scientifique et technique: ses acteur et leurs logic, Actes du colloque des 12 et 13 decembre 1996, 75–92.ISBN 2-7442-0021-2

Bauer M & J Durant (1997) Astrology in present-day Britain: an approach from the sociology of knowledge, Cosmos and Culture - Journal of the History of Astrology and Cultural Astronomy, 1, 1-17

With G Gaskell & J Durant et al. (1997) Europe ambivalent on biotechnology, Nature, 387, 345-347 (June)

Bauer M and H Joffe (1996) The `I don't know' response in social research - meanings of self-attributed ignorance, Social Science Information, 35,1, 6-13 [editorial to special issue]

Bauer M (1996) Socio-economic correlates of DK-responses in knowledge surveys, Social Science Information, 35,1, 39-68

Durant, J; A Hansen, and M Bauer (1996) Public understanding of human genetics; in: T Marteau and M Richards (eds) The troubled helix: social and psychological implications of the new human genetics, Cambridge University Press, 235–248.

Bauer, M (1995) Technophobia: a misleading conception of resistance to new technology; in: Bauer, M. (ed) Resistance to new technology - nuclear power, information technology, biotechnology, Cambridge, Cambridge University Press, 97–124.

Bauer, M (1995) Towards a functional analysis of resistance; in: Bauer, M. (ed) Resistance to new technology - nuclear power, information technology, biotechnology, Cambridge, Cambridge University Press, 393–418.

Bauer M, J Durant and G Evans (1994) European public perceptions of science, International Journal of Public Opinion Research, 6, 2, 163-186

Bauer M (1994) Science and Technology in the British Press, 1946–1986, in: B Schiele, M Amyot and C Benoit (eds) When Science becomes Culture, Boucherville, University of Ottawa Press - vol II, ISBN 2-921146-18-5.

Bauer, M and I Schoon (1993a) Mapping variety in Public Understanding of Science, Public Understanding of Science, 2, 2, 141–155.

Bauer, M. (1991) Resistance to change - a monitor of new technology, Systems Practice, 4, 3, 181-196
