= George Gaskell =

British academic

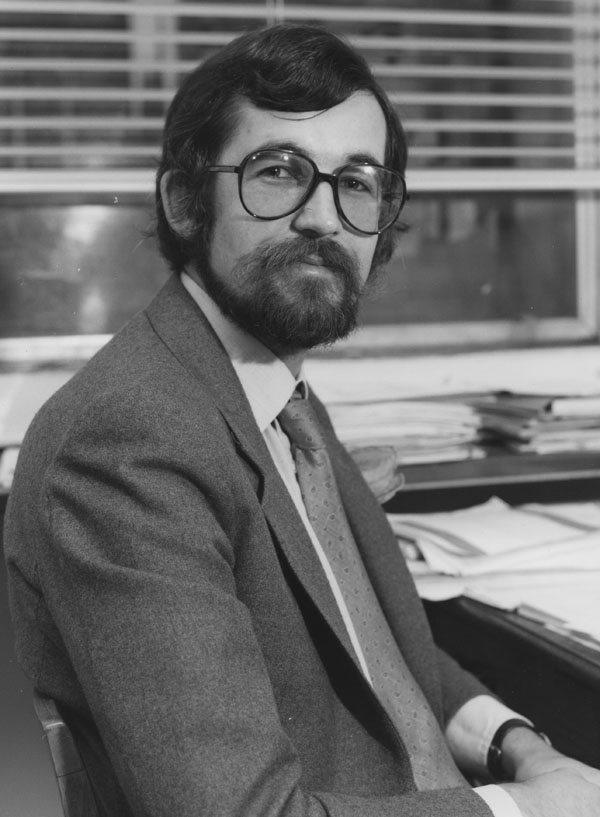
- George Gaskell in 1983
- Education: University College London
- Known for: toblerone model of social representations
- Scientific career
- Fields: Psychology
- Workplaces: Institute of Social Psychology, London School of Economics
- Thesis: An empirical investigation of social and individual factors influencing decisions on risk related items
- Doctoral advisor: Rob Farr
- Doctoral students: Nicola Morant, Gordon Sammut

George Gaskell is a British Emeritus Professor of Social Psychology at the London School of Economics and Political Science (LSE). Formerly Director of the Methodology Institute, which he established with Colm O’Muircheartaigh, he was Pro-director for Planning and Resources and a member of the LSE Council and Court of Governors.

He is a member of the Advisory Group on Risk Communication of the European Food Safety Authority and Chair of the International Advisory Committee of the Centre for Society and Genomics in the Netherlands. He was vice-chair of the European Commission’s Science and Society Advisory Committee for FP6 and a member of the Science in Society Committee of the Royal Society and the Economic and Social Research Council’s Evaluation Committee.

== Biography ==
George Gaskell graduated from University College London in 1969, and completed his PhD in social psychology under the supervision of Professor Rob Farr in 1973. He joined the Institute of Social Psychology at the London School of Economics in 1971.

== Research and Intellectual Interests ==
George Gaskell’s research interests fall under the rubric of societal psychology, an approach he developed with the late Hilde Himmelweit, which suggests that a neglected focus in social psychology is the study of social phenomena and cultural forces that both shape, and in turn are shaped by, people's outlooks and actions. Past research projects include the study of energy use and conservation, the crowd in contemporary Britain, youth and unemployment, and social and cognitive aspects of survey methodology.

George Gaskell is well known for developing the toblerone model of social representations with Martin Bauer, for his edited handbook with Martin Bauer, Qualitative Researching with Text, Image and Sound: A Practical Handbook (2000), which provides a comprehensive and accessible introduction to a broad range of research methods with the objective of clarifying procedures, good practice and public accountability – now translated into Portuguese, Hebrew and Chinese.

His current research, drawing on social representations theory, focuses on science, technology and society, in particular the issues of risk and trust; how values influence people’s views about technological innovation, and the governance of science and technology. Since 1996 he has coordinated the series of Eurobarometer surveys on ‘Biotechnology and the Life Sciences’ for DG Research. He was principal investigator of ‘Life Sciences in European Society’ (LSES), a European comparative study of biotechnology in the public sphere funded by FP6 of the European Commission and more recently ‘Sensitive technologies and European Public Ethics’ (STEPE).

== Publications ==
Edited books and monographs

Gaskell, G., and Bauer, M. (Eds). (2001). Biotechnology 1996-2000: The years of controversy. London: Science Museum Press.

Bauer, M., and Gaskell, G. (Eds). (2000). Qualitative researching with text, image and sound. London: Sage.

Durant, J., Bauer, M., and Gaskell, G. (1998). Biotechnology in the Public Sphere: a European Source Book. London: Science Museum Publications.

Wright, D.B., and Gaskell, G. (Eds). (1998). Surveying memory processes. Hove, Psychology Press

Himmelweit, H., and Gaskell, G. (Eds). (1990). Societal Psychology. Newbury Park, CA: Sage.

Fraser, C., and Gaskell, G. (Eds). (1990). The Social Psychological Study of Widespread Beliefs. Oxford University Press.

Gaskell, G., and Benewick, R. (1987). The Crowd in Contemporary Britain. London: Sage.

Gaskell, G., and Joerges, B. (Eds). (1987) Public Policies and Private Actions. Aldershot: Avebury WZB

Monnier, E., Gaskell, G., Ester, P., Joerges, B., LaPillone, C.J.H., Midden, C., and Puiseux, L. (Eds). (1986). Consumer Behavior and Energy Policy. New York: Praeger.

Hutton, S., Gaskell, G., Corden, A, Pike, R, and Bradshaw, J. (1985). Energy efficiency in low income households: An evaluation of local insulation projects. Department of Energy, HMSO, London.

Ester, P., Gaskell, G., Joerges, B., Midden, C., de Vries, T., and van Raaij, W. (Eds) (1984). Consumer Behaviour and Energy Policy. North Holland, Amsterdam, New York.

Gaskell, G., and Sealy, A.P. (1976). Groups: Block 13, D305 Social Psychology, p. 81. Open University Press.

Selected articles and chapters post 1994

Gaskell, G., Allum, N., Wagner, W., Kronberger, N., Torgensen, H., and Bardes, J. (2004). GM foods and the misperception of risk perception. Risk analysis, 24. (1). 183 - 192.

Ten Eyck, T., Gaskell, G., and Jackson, J.P. (2004). Seeds, food and trade wars: Public opinion and policy responses in the US and Europe. Journal of Commercial Biotechnology. 10: 3, 258-267.

Gaskell, G., Allum, N., Bauer, M., Jackson, J.P., Howard, S. and Lindsey, N. (2003). Climate change for biotechnology? UK public opinion 1991-2002. AgBioForum, vol 6 nos 1&2.

Gaskell, G., Allum, N. and Stares, S. (2003). Europeans and Biotechnology in 2002: Eurobarometer 58.0 ()

Gaskell, G., and Allum, N. (2001). Sound science, problematic publics? Contrasting representations of risk and uncertainty. Politeia XV11, 63, 13-25.

Gaskell, G. et al. (2000). Biotechnology and the European Public. Nature Biotechnology, 18, 935-938.

Gaskell, G., Wright, D. and O'Muircheartaigh, C. (2000). Telescoping landmark events: Implications for survey research. Public Opinion Quarterly, 64, 77-89.

Gaskell, G. (2000). Individual and group interviewing, pp 38–56, in Bauer M and G Gaskell (eds) Qualitative researching with text, image and sound. London: Sage.

Gaskell, G. and Bauer, M. (2000). Towards public accountability: Beyond sampling, reliability and validity, pp336–350, In Bauer M & G Gaskell (eds) Qualitative researching with text, image and sound. London: Sage.

Bauer, M., Gaskell, G. and Allum, N. (2000). Quantity, quality and knowledge interests: Avoiding confusions, pp3–18, in Bauer M & G Gaskell (eds) Qualitative researching with text, image and sound. London: Sage.

Durant, J., Bauer, M., Gaskell, G., Midden, C., Liakopoulos, M., and Sholten, L. (2000). Industrial and post-industrial public understanding of science, in: Dierkes M and C von Grote (eds) Between understanding and trust: the public, science and technology, Reading, Harwood, Academics Publisher.

Gaskell, G., Bauer, M., Durant, J. and Allum, N. (1999). Worlds apart: The reception of GM foods in the United States and Europe. Science. July 16.

Bauer, M and Gaskell, G. (1999). Towards a paradigm for research on social representations, Journal for the Theory of Social Behaviour, 29(2), 163-186.

Gaskell, G., Bauer, M. and Durant, J. (1998). The representations of biotechnology: policy, media and public perceptions. In Durant, J., Bauer, M. and Gaskell, G. (eds) Biotechnology in the public sphere: a European source book. London: Science Museum Press.

Gaskell, G., Bauer, M. and Durant, J. (1998). Public perceptions of biotechnology. Eurobarometer 46.1. In Durant, J., Bauer, M. and Gaskell, G. (eds) Biotechnology in the public sphere: a European source book. London: Science Museum Press.

Bauer, M,. Durant, J,. Gaskell, G., Bridgman, E, and Liakopoulos, M. (1998). United Kingdom: national profile. In Durant.J., Bauer, M. and Gaskell, G. (eds) Biotechnology in the public sphere: a European source book. London: Science Museum Press.

Bauer.M., Durant, J. and Gaskell, G. (1998). Biotechnology in the public sphere: a comparative review. In Durant, J,.Bauer, M. and Gaskell, G. (eds) Biotechnology in the public sphere: a European source book. London: Science Museum Press.

Wright, D. B., Gaskell, G. D. and O'Muircheartaigh, C. A. (1998). Flashbulb memory assumptions: Using national surveys to explore cognitive phenomena. British journal of psychology, 36, 443-456.

Gaskell, G et al. (1997). Europe ambivalent on biotechnology. Nature, 387, pp 845–847

Wright, D.B., Gaskell, G.D. and O'Muircheartaigh, C.A. (1997). Temporal estimation of major news events: Re-examining the accessibility principle. Applied cognitive psychology, 11, 35-46.

Wright, D.B., Gaskell, G.D. and O'Muircheartaigh, C.A. (1997). The reliability of the subjective reports of memories. European journal of cognitive psychology, 9, 313-323.

Gaskell, G., Bauer, M. and Durant, J. (1997) Survey research on public attitudes to public to science and technology in S. Sjoberg and E. Kallerud (eds) Science, technology and citizenship. Oslo. NIFU.

Gaskell, G and Wright, D (1997) Group differences for memory of a political event. In J.W. Pennebaker, D. Paez and D. Rime (eds) Collective memory of political events: Social psychological perspectives. New York: LEA.

O'Muircheartaigh, C, Gaskell, G and Wright, D. (1996). Weighing anchors:verbal and numeric labels for response scales. Journal of Official Statistics. 11, 3, 295-307.

Gaskell, G. (1996). On the lure of metrication: Attitudes and social representations. Papers on Social Representations. 5, no.1.

Gaskell, G. (1996). People's understanding of vague quantifiers. Survey Methods Centre Newsletter. vol. 16, no.2.

Gaskell, G, Wright, D and O'Muircheartaigh, C. (1995). Context effects in the measurement of attitudes: A comparison of the consistency and framing explanations. British Journal of Social Psychology, 34, 383-393.

Gaskell, G, Dockrell, J and Rehman, H. (1995). Community care for people with challenging behaviours and mild learning disability. An evaluation of an assessment and treatment unit. British Journal of Clinical Psychology, 34, 385-395.

Dockrell, J, Gaskell, G, Normand, C and Rehman, H. (1995). An economic analysis of the resettlement of people with mild learning disabilities and challenging behaviour. Social Science and Medicine, 40, 7, 895-901.

Wright, D and Gaskell, G. (1995). Flashbulb memories: Conceptual and methodological issues. Memory, 3, 1, 67-80.
