= Paul L. Harris =

British psychologist and academic

Paul L. Harris FBA
- Born: 14 May 1946 (age 80)
- Education: Sussex University (BA), St John's College, Oxford (D.Phil)
- Occupations: psychologist and academic
- Employer: professor at Harvard Graduate School of Education
- Known for: specialising in child development
- Notable work: see Publications
- Awards: see Awards

Paul L. Harris FBA (born 14 May 1946) is a British psychologist and academic specialising in child development. He is a professor at Harvard Graduate School of Education in Cambridge, Massachusetts.

== Education ==
Harris earned a B.A. in Psychology from Sussex University and a D. Phil. in Psychology and Experimental Psychology from St John's College, Oxford.

== Research ==
Since 2001 he has been a professor at Harvard Graduate School of Education. His research focuses on how children use their imaginations, first-hand experience, and trust in what they're told, to understand the world.

=== Publications ===
- The Development of Psychological Understanding, 1989.
- Perspectives on the Child's Theory of Mind, edited, 1991, with G.E. Butterworth, A.M. Leslie, et H.M. Wellman.
- Children's Understanding of Emotions 1989, avec C. Saarni.
- Developing Theories of Mind 1988 with J.W. Astington et D.R. Olson.
- The Work of the Imagination 2000.
- Imagining the Impossible: Magical, Scientific, and Religious Thinking in Children, co-editor, 2000, with K. S. Rosengren et C. N. Johnson.
- Trusting What You’re Told: How Children Learn from Others, 2015.

== Awards ==
- In 1998 he was elected a Fellow of the British Academy.
- In 2005 he was awarded a Guggenheim Fellowship.
- In 2006 he was made a member of the Norwegian Academy of Science and Letters.
- In 2007 he was granted an honorary Doctorate from the University de Rennes.
- In 2009 he was elected a Fellow of the Association for Psychological Science.
- In 2014 he was awarded the American Psychological Association Eleanor Maccoby Book Award in developmental psychology.
- In 2015 he was elected a Fellow of the American Academy of Arts and Sciences.
