= Claire Selltiz =

American psychologist

Claire Selltiz (1914–2000) was an American social psychologist who is credited with laying out three principles of causality: correlation, precedence and nonspuriousness, in the 1959 introductory research methods textbook Research methods in social relations of which she was the lead author. Salvatore Babones notes that prior to her widely cited 1959 book "there seems to be no earlier formulation of the three principles as such", and that "the entire academic community... adopted these principles" from that book.

== See also ==
- Obliteration by incorporation
