= Jean-Claude Abric =

French psychologist

- Born: Jean-Claude Abric; September 26, 1941; Riom
- Died: September 13, 2012 (aged 70); Aix-en-Provence
- Scientific career
- Fields: social psychology
- Institutions: University of Aix-Marseille

Jean-Claude Abric (26 September 1941 – 13 September 2012) was a French psychologist, professor in social psychology and the former head of the Social Psychology Laboratory at the University of Aix-Marseille.

He had a major contribution to the theory of social representation identifying the structural elements of a social representation and distinguishing the core elements from the peripheral ones. His first study on social representations was based on craftsmen and the craft industry (Abric, 1984). In his book published in 1994, he gives a broader vision of his Central Nucleus Theory (Abric, 1994).

He also published handbooks on the psychology of communication (Abric, 2008).

== Key publications ==
- Abric, J.-C. (1984). "L'artisan et l'artisanat : analyse du contenu et de la structure d'une représentation sociale." Bulletin de psychologie 27: p. 861–876.
- Abric, J.-C. (1994). Pratiques sociales et représentations, Paris: PUF.
- Abric, J.-C. (2008). Psychologie de la communication : théories et méthodes, Paris: Armand Colin.
