= Group Processes & Intergroup Relations =

- Discipline: Social psychology
- Language: English
- Edited by: Dominic Abrams, Michael A Hogg

Publication details
- History: 1998-present
- Publisher: SAGE Publications
- Frequency: Bimonthly
- Impact factor: 4.4 (2022)

Standard abbreviations
- ISO 4: Group Process. Intergr. Relat.

Indexing
- ISSN: 1368-4302 (print); 1461-7188 (web)
- OCLC no.: 477354069

Links
- Journal homepage; Online access; Online archive

Group Processes & Intergroup Relations is a bimonthly peer-reviewed academic journal that covers research in the field of social psychology, including organizational and management sciences, political science, sociology, language and communication, cross cultural psychology, and intergroup relations, among others. The journal's editors-in-chief are Dominic Abrams (University of Kent) and Michael Hogg (Claremont Graduate University). It was established in 1998 and is published by SAGE Publications.

== Abstracting and indexing ==
The journal is abstracted and indexed in Scopus and the Social Sciences Citation Index. According to the Journal Citation Reports, the journal has a 2022 impact factor of 4.4.
