= Michael Hogg =

Australian psychologist

- Born: Michael A. Hogg; 1954 (age 71–72); Calcutta, India
- Education: University of Birmingham, University of Bristol
- Occupation: Social psychologist
- Awards: Fellow of the British Academy
- Scientific career
- Workplaces: Bristol University, Macquarie University, University of Melbourne, University of Queensland, Claremont Graduate University
- Thesis: Investigations into the social psychology of group formation : a cognitive perspective (1983)
- Doctoral advisor: John Turner

Michael A. Hogg (born 1954) is a British psychologist, and professor of social psychology in the Department of Psychology at Claremont Graduate University in Los Angeles. He is also an honorary professor of social psychology at the University of Kent in the UK.

== Biography ==
Hogg was born in 1954 in Calcutta, India, where his parents (his father was Scottish, his mother English and Welsh) were employed at the time of his birth. When he was about two his family moved to Colombo in Sri Lanka, where he attended the Overseas International School in Colombo and then the Hill School in Nuwara Eliya.

In 1968, the family moved back to England. After one term at Warwick Grammar School, the family moved to Bristol, where Hogg attended Bristol Grammar School until he graduated in 1973. He then studied physics for a year at the University of Birmingham, and then transferred to study psychology and graduated with his BSc in 1977. After a year traveling around south and central America, Hogg returned to England in 1978 to embark on his PhD in social psychology at Bristol University. He received his PhD (dated 1983) and taught at Bristol University for three years before moving to Australia in 1985 to a postdoctoral fellowship at Macquarie University in Sydney. In 1986, he moved to a faculty position at University of Melbourne, and then in 1991 he moved to the University of Queensland, where he remained until moving to California in 2006. He currently teaches at Claremont Graduate University in Claremont, California.

Hogg received the Australian Psychological Society's early career award in 1989, and the Society for Personality and Social Psychology's mid-career Carol and Ed Diener award in 2010. In 2013, he served as president of the Society of Experimental Social Psychology. He is also the foundation editor, with Dominic Abrams at the University of Kent, of the journal Group Processes and Intergroup Relations - first published in 1996.

In August 2010, the Personality and Social Psychology Bulletin ranked Hogg the 9th most influential social psychologist. Researchers ranked 611 faculty members at 97 universities across the United States and Canada using complex formulas that measured the frequency with which the faculty member published work and how often that work is cited. These formulas included adjustments to account for a researcher's experience in terms of how many years it has been since an individual earned a PhD.

== Work ==
Hogg's research focus is on social identity theory, a theory that was initially developed in the 1970's and first most fully published by Henri Tajfel and John Turner in 1979. Social identity theory was created to explain how and why people identify with particular social groups, and the various ways these identities affect people's perceptions, attitudes and behaviors. It provides a social psychological understanding of group processes and intergroup relations. While at Queensland, Hogg established and directed the Center for Research on Group Processes, and soon after arriving in Claremont set up the Social Identity Lab in the School of Behavioral and Organizational Sciences at Claremont Graduate University.

Research by Hogg and his students in the Social Identity Lab takes a self and social identity perspective on a wide range of topics associated with intergroup relations and the behavior of people in groups. One key focus is on how uncertainty drives people to groups and ideologies that resolve these uncertainties; another is on processes of influence and leadership within and between groups. Current research also seeks to understand radicalization and populism, mechanisms of group integration and disintegration, and how leadership can heal divided groups.

== Bibliography ==
Recent Hogg publications include:

- Cooper, J.; Hogg, M. A. (2007). "Feeling the anguish of others: A theory of vicarious dissonance". Advances in Experimental Social Psychology. 39: 359–403. doi:10.1016/S0065-2601(06)39007-7. ISBN 978-0-12-015239-1.
- Hogg, M. A. (2007). "Uncertainty-identity theory". Advances in Experimental Social Psychology. 39: 69–126. doi:10.1016/s0065-2601(06)39002-8. ISBN 9780120152391. S2CID 142670661.
- Hogg, M. A.; Sherman, D. K.; Dierselhuis, J.; Maitner, A. T.; Moffitt, G. (2007). "Uncertainty, entitativity, and group identification". Journal of Experimental Social Psychology. 43: 135–142. doi:10.1016/j.jesp.2005.12.008.
- Hogg, M. A. (2007). "Social psychology of leadership." In A. W. Kruglanski & E. T. Higgins (Eds.), Social Psychology: Handbook of Basic Principles (2nd ed., pp. 716–733). New York: Guilford.
- Hogg, M. A.; Fielding, K. S.; Johnson, D.; Masser, B.; Russell, E.; Svensson, A. (2006). "Demographic category membership and leadership in small groups: A social identity analysis". The Leadership Quarterly. 17 (4): 335–350. doi:10.1016/j.leaqua.2006.04.007.
- Hogg, M. A. (2006). "Social identity theory." In P. J. Burke (Ed.), Contemporary Social Psychological Theories (pp. 111–136). Palo Alto, CA: Stanford University Press. ISBN 0-8047-5347-4
- Abrams, Dominic; Hogg, Michael A. (1 April 1999). Social Identity and Social Cognition. Wiley. ISBN 978-0-631-20642-2.
