= Polyphase =

Polyphase may refer to:

- Polyphase matrix, in signal processing
- Polyphase system, in electrical engineering
- Polyphase quadrature filter
- Polyphasic sleep
