= Terri Conley =

American psychologist

- Born: United States
- Education: University of Wisconsin-Madison; University of California, Los Angeles
- Scientific career
- Fields: Social psychology
- Workplaces: University of Michigan

Terri Conley is an American social psychologist who studies gender differences in sexuality, consequences of departures from monogamy, and the consequences of masculinity threat. She is currently an associate professor of psychology and women's and gender studies at the University of Michigan, where she leads the Stigmatized Sexualities research lab.

== Early life ==
Terri Conley was raised in the small town of Greenfield, Indiana, by her closeted lesbian mother.

== Education ==
Conley completed a BA in psychology and women's studies (honors degree, with distinction in psychology) at the University of Wisconsin–Madison in 1993, where she wrote two honors theses and worked in three different research labs. She then went on to earn her MA in social psychology at the University of California, Los Angeles in 1995. After receiving her MA, Conley got her Ph.D. in social psychology at the University of California, Los Angeles in 1999, where she also minored in health psychology and measurement and psychometrics.

== Career ==
Directly after receiving her Ph.D., Conley began her career working as a Social Science Research Council postdoctoral fellow from 2000 to 2002. She then went on to become an assistant professor of psychology at California State University–Northridge in 2003 and 2004. From 2004 to 2008, Conley worked as an assistant professor of psychology and women's studies at the University of Missouri at both the St. Louis and Kansas City campuses. In 2008, Conley became an assistant professor of psychology and women's studies at the University of Michigan. In 2013, continuing at the University of Michigan, Conley became an associate professor of psychology and women's and gender studies. She works in a joint program in women's studies and psychology, with a concentration in personality and social contexts. Her three major lines of research include gender differences in sexuality, minority group members' perceptions of members in other groups, and the comparison between traditional monogamy and consensual non-monogamy. Conley is the head of the Stigmatized Sexualities research lab at the University of Michigan.

== Research ==
Conley's most notable contributions to the fields of social psychology and women's studies include demonstrating social factors that contribute to gender differences in sexuality (particularly, casual sex) and demonstrating that consensually non-monogamous relationships have similar (and sometimes superior) outcomes relative to monogamous relationships. One of Conley's studies involves the replication of the 1989 Clark and Hatfield study of casual sex offer acceptance. Conley has since conducted many more studies confirming her suspicions about the original Clark and Hatfield study. She has formulated an alternative explanation for why women are less likely to accept casual sex offers from a stranger. Conley found that women were passing on sexual advances out of fear of being judged as promiscuous and doubt that a one-night stand with a new partner would be pleasurable. She also discovered that regardless of gender, whoever was being approached with a casual sex offer was more "choosy", arguing against the assumption that women are the more selective gender. When discussing her research, Conley says: "I like to look beyond conducting research that confirms existing stereotypes". Although she enjoys this type of research, she also discusses the difficulties, remarking that "if you’re debunking stereotypes you have to do twice as much", and that "when you’re studying sexuality it’s really hard to be taken seriously".

=== Motivations ===
When discussing her motivations for studying gender and sexuality, she mentioned how "it occurred to me that every single paper I wrote has someone it's trying to take down or someone I'm mad at. I have sort of an adversarial approach to science, which I actually think is very healthy for science". Conley also describes the importance of the research she conducts, specifically in terms of consensual non-monogamy, mentioning that "anywhere in the US, an employer can say they're firing you because you're in a consensually non-monogamous relationship, and there's nothing you can do", citing that visibility and challenging stigmas will help move society in the right direction. Conley's main objective in researching sexuality is to eliminate stigmas surrounding the subject by conducting research that questions societal norms.

=== Gender differences in sexuality ===
Conley and colleagues have demonstrated that two of the main reasons women are less likely to accept heterosexual casual sex offers than men are: a) women are stigmatized to a greater extent than men are for participating in casual sex, and b) women anticipate that they will receive less sexual pleasure in the encounter than men do.

In Conley's study replicating Clark and Hatfield's 1989 study mentioned above, she found evidence that negates the gender differences asserted in the original study. Conley found that proposers of casual sex who were men (toward women) were "uniformly seen as less desirable than female sexual proposers", proving that the gender differences found in Clark and Hatfield's study have more to do with the gender of the proposer than of the study participant. She also found that the only consistent predictor of acceptance of casual sex for both men and women is perceived sexual capabilities, showing that the lower acceptance of casual sex offers by women found in Clark and Hatfield's study had more to do with their perception of the proposer's ability to be good in bed, and less to do with the study participant's gender.

In another study, Conley and her associates Ziegler and Moors found more proof that the gender differences asserted by researchers and social norms have less to do with inherent gender differences, and more to do with backlash effects and sexual double standards imposed on women by society. Conley et al. found that the stigma associated with women having casual sex can often decrease the likelihood that they accept casual sex offers. Although casual sex can often be stigmatized for men and women, Conley et al. found that women were "more strongly influenced by fear and stigma".

Much of Conley's research supports pleasure theory, which Conley describes as the idea that "the pursuit of pleasure is the central force that motivates sexual behavior" for both men and women. This theory comes from the large pleasure gap in sexual encounters between men and women, where men can expect to have a pleasurable time in most sexual encounters, where women will not always experience pleasure. As previously discussed above, Conley found that the differences found in the 1989 Clark and Hatfield study had more to do with “women’s perception that their heterosexual casual sex partners will be unlikely to give them pleasure”, than gender differences in casual sex interest. She also conducted research on bisexual women that showed this to be true - these bisexual women were far more likely to accept a casual sex offer from a woman than a man, due to their perceived ability to pleasure the participant.

Relatedly, Conley has investigated the role that orgasm plays in reactions to casual sex. Piemonte, Conley & Gusakova (2019), found that, despite stereotypes of women being less satisfied and more distressed by their casual sex experiences than men, gender differences in response to casual sex encounters evaporate when controlling for whether the participant had an orgasm during the casual sex encounter.

=== Monogamy and its alternatives ===
In her research on monogamy and its alternatives, Conley demonstrated that, despite widespread acceptance of the notion that monogamous relationships are superior to other non-monogamous arrangements, scant evidence exists in support of this supposition. Conley calls this phenomenon of seeing monogamy as preferable and inherently better than consensual non-monogamy a 'halo effect". When asked to describe it, Conley defines consensual non-monogamy as "a relational arrangement in which partners agree that it is acceptable to have more than one sexual and/or romantic relationship at the same time".

In conducting research on consensually non-monogamous relationships, Conley found that people in consensually non-monogamous (CNM) relationships are more likely to use condoms and use them more correctly than monogamous people who are secretly cheating on their partner. Conley's research demonstrates that monogamy may not be as protective against sexually transmitted infections as would be expected, given that people in CNM relationships are much more likely to practice safer sex. Likewise, people in certain types of CNM relationships report higher levels of relational adjustment than those in monogamous relationships. Sexual satisfaction of those in some types of CNM relationships is also higher than that of individuals in monogamous relationships.

Discussing the act of researching non-monogamy, Conley describes how she is perceived as a worse scientist because she conducts research that does not confirm stereotypes, and that researchers that do support popular stereotypes are perceived as less biased and better scientists. She also describes how she is perceived as having a connection to the consensually non-monogamous community because of her research, or that she "just want[s] everyone to be polyamorous", due to the fact that she conducted research that had positive findings about non-monogamy.
