= Societal psychology =

Aspect of social psychology

Societal psychology is a development within social psychology which emphasizes the all-embracing force of the social, institutional, and cultural environments, and with it the study of social phenomena in their own right as they affect, and are affected by, the members of the particular society. The term societal psychology was coined by Hilde Himmelweit and George Gaskell in 1990, in preference to sociological social psychology, to avoid a single alliance to one other discipline.

Societal psychology is proffered as a counterweight to mainstream social psychology's concentration on the study of the individual's thoughts, feelings and actions, while paying little attention to the study of the environment, its culture and its institutions. Societal psychology seeks to address these issues and in so doing calls into question many of social psychology's basic assumptions.

Research within the framework of societal psychology is not restricted to a few psychological methods, such as experimentation. Scholars in the field use the whole range of qualitative and quantitative social science methods and attempt to triangulate and validate their findings by different methods. The choice and actual sequence of methods used depends on the particular problem addressed.

A number of theories are held to be particularly relevant to the development of societal psychology, such as Henri Tajfel's theories of social identity and intergroup relations, and Serge Moscovici's theories of social change and minority influence, the theory of social representations, as well as some approaches and methods from media studies, and discourse analysis, among others.

Societal psychology is characterised by fifteen key propositions:

1. Human beings need to be studied in a sociocultural context
2. The individual and the collective cannot be separated ontologically
3. The ecology of the environment, its objective characteristics, needs to be studied alongside its mediated reality
4. People create social organizations—but it is the social organizations that recast people
5. Innovation is as much an imperative of the social system of relations to the environment as is conformity
6. The aim of societal psychology is the development of conceptual frameworks or models rather than the forlorn search for invariant laws
7. The need for theoretical and methodological pluralism
8. There is a need to maintain a historical perspective
9. Cross-fertilization between societal psychology and the other social sciences is indispensable for the adequate analysis of social phenomena and social systems
10. There is a need for cross-fertilization among societal, developmental, and personality psychologists
11. There is also a need for cross-fertilization between basic and applied research
12. Societal psychology requires a systems approach
13. The study of a social phenomenon requires a multilevel approach, at the macro as well as the micro level
14. We need to accept and examine the implication that there is no such thing as value-free social research
15. We need to adopt a much wider range of research tools
