= Collective representations =

Collective representations are concepts, ideas, categories and beliefs that do not belong to isolated individuals, but are instead the product of a social collectivity.

== Overview ==
Émile Durkheim originated the term "collective representations" to emphasise the way that many of the categories of everyday use—space, time, class, number, etc.—were in fact the product of collective social life: "Collective representations are the result of an immense co-operation, which stretches not only into space but into time as well." Collective representations are generally slow-changing and backed by social authority, and can be seen as the product of self-referencing institutions.

While largely ignored by other sociologists, Durkheim's theory of collective representations was taken up by the anthropologist Lucien Lévy-Bruhl, who argued for seeing magic and religion as the product of collective representations infused with emotional participation (as in powerful rituals). Towards the end of the 20th century, Serge Moscovici renewed interest in the concept in the field of social psychology, adapting it to cover social representations that were more limited in scope and time than Durkheim’s collective representations. Seen as shared mental maps of the social world, collective representations continue to affect the ways entities such as Europe are viewed in the 21st century.

Collective representations are a subject of study in the context of genocide and the impact of the media on the formation of collective representations of genocide (where the media is the agent of representation and victims and perpetrators become the subject of representation, even in their own first-hand accounts and testimonies). The representation of genocide is fraught with challenges. Specifically, survivors' literature attests to the question (and impossibility) of authentic representation, even as scholars widely acknowledge the worthiness of giving voice and agency to survivors and to victims of genocide. On this point, Holocaust survivor Jean Améry has written, "It would be totally senseless to try and describe here the pain that was inflicted on me. [...] The pain was what it was. Beyond that there is nothing to say."

When the media becomes the agent of representations in an event like genocide, the plurality of representations is recognized as inevitable, because the media can not be understood as a mirror of objective reality. Media outlets construct narratives (or representations) by the selection, framing and composition of information. They report on events of global significance in certain cultural and political contexts in which the contesting representations based on the fragmentary memories of traumatized survivors, perpetrators and witnesses are fought over by politicians and other interested parties. Scholars acknowledge that the labeling of events and communities imposes values and rules on the object of the representation. The impact of such media narratives on the formation of collective representations is still being studied.

== See also ==
- Collective unconscious
- Edmund Burke
- Marcel Mauss
- Jean Piaget
