= Sandra Jovchelovitch =

Brazilian social psychologist

- Born: 1960 (age 65–66); Porto Alegre, Brazil

Academic background
- Education: Catholic University of Rio Grande do Sul (PUCRS); London School of Economics
- Thesis: Social representations and public life: a study on the symbolic construction of public spaces in Brazil (1995)
- Doctoral advisor: Rob Farr

Academic work
- Discipline: Social psychology
- Sub-discipline: social representations
- Institutions: London School of Economics

Sandra Jovchelovitch, is a Brazilian-born social psychologist, currently professor of social psychology and director of the MSc program in social and cultural psychology at the Institute of Social Psychology at the London School of Economics (LSE), of which she has served as head since August 2007. Jovchelovitch is co-editor of the Journal of Community and Applied Social Psychology and directs a book series on contemporary social psychology for the Brazilian publishing house Vozes. She also serves on the editorial boards of the European Journal of Social Psychology and Psicologia e Sociedade. She has held appointments at the Maison de Sciences de l'Homme, under the auspices of CNPq (Brazilian National Council for Science and Technology) and also teaches regularly in Brazil, being on the faculty (Associate Professor) of the Federal University of Rio Grande do Sul (UFRGS).

== Biography ==
Jovchelovitch was born in Porto Alegre, Brazil. She was trained as a clinical social psychologist at the Catholic University of Rio Grande do Sul (PUCRS) in Brazil. She lectured at her alma mater until the 1990s, at which point she transitioned to the LSE to conduct research and pursue doctoral studies. Her thesis was titled Social representations and public life: a study on the symbolic construction of public spaces in Brazil. She joined the Institute of Social Psychology at LSE in 1995.

== Publications ==
Single Authored Monographs

(2007) Knowledge in Context: Representations, community and culture, London: Routledge.

(2000) Representações Sociais e Espaço Público: A construção simbólica dos espaços públicos no Brasil, [Social Representations and Public Life: The symbolic construction of public spaces in Brazil], Petrópolis: Vozes.

Joint Authored Research Monograph

(1998). The Health Beliefs of the Chinese Community in England. London: Health Education Authority. (with M-C. Gervais).

Edited Volume

(1994) Textos em Representações Sociais, [Texts on Social Representations], Petrópolis: Vozes. (12th reprint 2005). (with P.A. Guareschi).

Refereed Articles

(2005) La fonction symbolique et la construction des representations: la dynamique communicationnelle ego/alter/object, [The symbolic function and the making of representation: Understanding the communicative dynamic between self-other-object], Hermés 41: 51–57.

(2004) Psicologia Social : Saber, comunidade e cultura. Psicologia e Sociedade 16, 2: 20–31.

(2004) Contextualiser les focus groups: comprendre groupes et cultures dans la recherche sur le représentations. Bulletin de Psychologie 57, 3: 245–252.

(2004) Participation, health and the development of community resources in Southern Brazil. Journal of Health Psychology 9, 2: 311–322. (with P.A. Guareschi)

(2002) Re-thinking the Diversity of Knowledge: Cognitive polyphasia, belief and representation. Psychologie & Société 5: 121–138.

(2000) Health, Community and Development: Towards a social psychology of participation. Journal of Community and Applied Social Psychology 10, 4: 255–270. (with C. Campbell)

(2000) Health, Community and Development. Special Issue. Journal of Community and Applied Social Psychology. 10: 4. (Guest Editor with C. Campbell).

(1999) Social representations of Health and Illness: The case of the Chinese community in England. Journal of Community and Applied Social Psychology 9: 247–260.(with MC Gervais).

(1999) Theory and method of social representations. Asian Journal of Social Psychology 2: 59–89. (with W. Wagner, G. Duveen, R.M. Farr, F. Lorenzi-Cioldi, I. Marková, & D. Rose).

(1998) Health and Identity: The case of the Chinese community in England. Social Science Information 37, 4: 709–729. (with M-C. Gervais).

(1998) Emancipation and Domination in Social Representations of Public Life. Interamerican Journal of Psychology 32, 2: 169–189.

(1998) Representações Sociais: Para uma fenomenologia dos saberes sociais. Psicologia e Sociedade 10, 1: 54–68.

(1997) Peripheral Groups and the Transformation of Social Representations: Queries on Power and Recognition. Social Psychological Review 1, 1: 16–26.

(1996) In Defense of Representations. Journal for the Theory of Social Behaviour 26, 2: 121–135.

(1996) Espaços the Mediação e Gênese das Representações Sociais, Psico 27, 1: 193–205.

(1996) Organisation psychology and psychologists in organisations: Focus on Organisational Transformation (with P. Humphreys and D. Berkeley) Journal of the Interamerican Society of Psychology 30, 1: 27–42.

(1995) Social Representations in and of the Public Sphere: Towards a Theoretical Articulation. Journal for the Theory of Social Behaviour 25, 1: 81–102.

(1995) Questioning Consensus in Social Representations Theory. Papers on Social Representations 4, 2: 150–155.

(1994) Social Representations and Social Constructivism: A Shared Agenda? Comment on Maria Banch's Descontruyendo una Desconstruccion. Papers on Social Representations 3, 2: 225–228.

(1993) Social Representations: The Versatility of a Concept. Papers on Social Representations, 2: 3-10 (with A. Allansdottir. and A. Stathopoulou).

Book Chapters

(2006) Repenser la diversité de la connaissance: polyphasie cognitive, croyances et representations. In V. Hass (Ed.) Les Savois du quotidian. Transmission, appropriations, representations. Presses Universitaires de Rennes.

(2002) Social Representations and Narratives: Stories of Public Life in Brazil. In Lazlo, J. & Stainton Rogers, W. (Eds.) Narrative and Social Psychology. Budapeste: Budapeste University Press.

(2001) Social Representations, Public Life and Social Construction. In Deaux, K. & Philogene, G. (Eds) Representations of the Social. Blackwell: New York.

(2000) Narrative Interviewing. In M.W. Bauer and G.Gaskell ( Eds. ) Qualitative researching with text, image and sound: A practical handbook. pp. 57–74. London: Sage. (with M.W. Bauer)

(2000) Corruption flows in our blood: Mixture and impurity in representations of public life in Brazil. In M. Chaib and B. Orfali (Eds) Social Representations and Communicative Processes. pp. 139–155. Jönköping : Jönköping University Press.

(1998) Re(des)cobrindo o Outro: Para um entendimento da alteridade na teoria das representações sociais.(pp. 69–82) In A. Arruda (Ed) Representando a Alteridade. Petrópolis, RJ: Vozes.

(1998) Intervening in the Public Sphere: Emancipation and Domination in Representational Fields. In A.-V. D. Riga (Ed.) Social Representations and Contemporary Social Problems. Athens: Ellinika Grammata.

(1994) Vivendo a Vida com os Outros: Espaço Público, Intersubjetividade e Representações Sociais. (Living with Others: Public Space, Intersubjectivity and Social Representations) In Guareschi, P.A. & Jovchelovitch, S. (eds) Textos em Representações Sociais. Petrópolis: Vozes, pp. 63–85.
