= Henri-Louis Empaytaz =

Henri-Louis Empaytaz (1790–1853), was a Protestant theologian. He was born and died in Geneva.

After Napoleon Bonaparte's downfall in 1814 and the general disillusionment with the ideals of the French Revolution, Empaytaz was a leading member of Le Réveil (The Awakening).

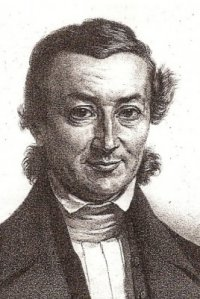
Henri-Louis Empeytaz

== Biography ==
He was one of the first in the Protestant church where ideas, excitement and denials of the French Revolution, had died in France and Switzerland in the years 1814 to 1816. They believed that the ground was so thoroughly cleaned of all liberal aspirations that they could and should, return to the pure teachings of the sixteenth century in religious matters.

In his view, the Church in Geneva had lost its way and that the dogma of tsomee divinity of Christ had been removed from the symbol of Ministers in Geneva. He joined other pastoralists César Malan, Guers, Ami Bost and other no less absolute in their beliefs, and desiring to live pure lives and they taught that the absolute truth of all that is written in the Bible. This movement was called Le Réveil (The Awakening)

His ideas had a profound effect on Alexander I of Russia and for a time he became a confidant of the emperor's most secret thoughts. Through his contact with the Russian Emperor he believed that he and Madam von Krüdener were in part responsible for the religious aspects of the Holy Alliance.

== See also ==
- Louis Gaussen
- Adolphe Monod
