= Monod =

Monod is a French-language surname of Swiss origin. Notable people with the surname include:

- Adolphe Monod (1802–1856), French Protestant churchman; brother of Frédéric Monod.
- Frédéric Monod (1794–1863), French Protestant pastor.
- Gabriel Monod (1844-1912), French historian
- Henri Monod (1843-1911), son of Frédéric Monod.
- Jacques Monod (1910–1976), French biologist and winner of the 1965 Nobel Prize in Physiology or Medicine.
- Jacques-Louis Monod (b. 1927), French musician.
- Jérôme Monod (1930-2016), French business executive and political advisor.
- Nicolas Monod, Swiss mathematician.
- Théodore Monod (1836–1921), French Protestant pastor and hymn writer; son of Frédéric Monod.
- Théodore André Monod (1902–2000), French naturalist, explorer, and humanist scholar; son of Théodore Monod.
- Wilfred Monod (1867-1943) French Protestant theologian.
