= Le Phare de Guinée =

Le Phare de Guinée (French for 'The Lighthouse of Guinea') was a newspaper published in Guinea between 1947 and 1949. The newspaper was published by the Democratic Party of Guinea (PDG), the Guinean section of the African Democratic Rally (RDA).

Le Phare de Guinée was launched as a biweekly newspaper by the PDG in September 1947 as the PDG was reluctant to fully rely on the weekly RDA organ issued from Dakar, Le Réveil. Mamadou Diallo was appointed as the director of Le Phare de Guinée.

The party wanted the newspaper to have extensive coverage of local affairs, and it directed each party subsection to appoint a correspondent for Le Phare de Guinée.

Le Phare de Guinée was printed in Casablanca (around 3,000 copies), and was sold for ten francs per copy (a price quite hefty for most Guineans at the time). As a measure to minimize costs, collective reading of the newspaper was encouraged by the party. The party also arranged oral translations into local languages.

However, as Le Réveil was cheaper and often less outdated than Le Phare de Guinée (since the newspaper was transported from printing in Casablanca, it often arrived with somewhat old news), large sections of the African intelligentsia in Guinea continued to prefer Le Réveil over Le Phare de Guinée. Le Réveil was also perceived as more sophisticated than Le Phare de Guinée.

Le Phare de Guinée struggled with the difficulty that no printing press in Guinea was willing to print it (due to pressures from the French colonial administration). Mamadou Diallo resigned from the PDG in April 1949. By that time the newspaper had failed to appear for months. In April 1950 a new, locally roneotyped, newspaper was launched to substitute Le Phare de Guinée, Coup de Bambou.
