= Alajärv (Viitina) =

Lake in Estonia

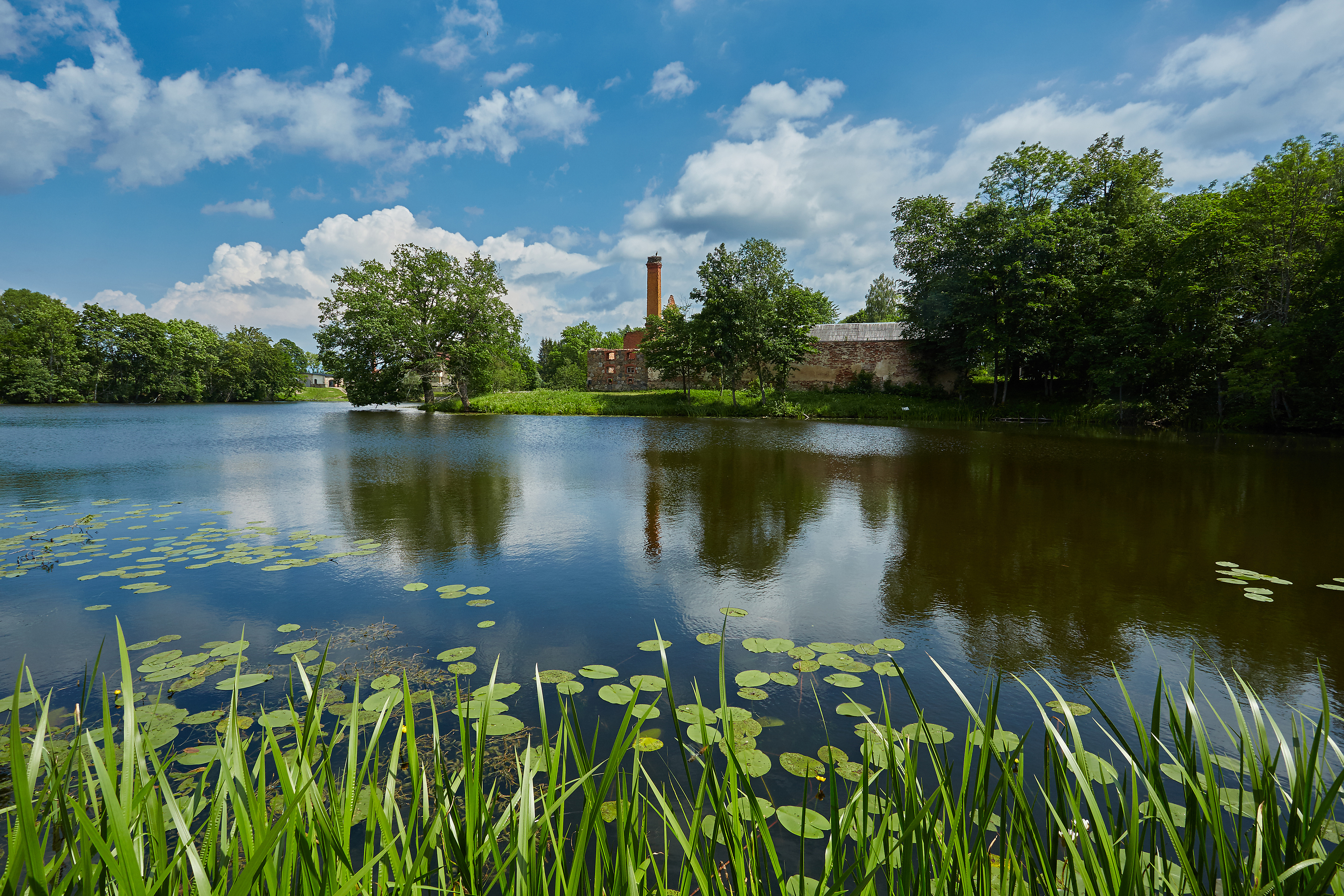

- Location within Estonia
- Location: Rõuge Parish, Võru County
- Coordinates: 57°41′35″N 26°56′37″E
- Basin countries: Estonia
- Max. length: 240 meters (790 ft)
- Surface area: 2.2 hectares (5.4 acres)
- Average depth: 1.3 meters (4 ft 3 in)
- Max. depth: 4.5 meters (15 ft)
- Shore length^{1}: 810 meters (2,660 ft)
- Surface elevation: 176.4 meters (579 ft)
- ^{1} Shore length is not a well-defined measure.

Alajärv (also known as Viitina Alajärv or Kose järv) is a lake in Estonia. It is located in the village of Viitina in Rõuge Parish, Võru County, close to the border with Latvia.

== Physical description ==
The lake has an area of 2.2 hectares (5.4 acres). The lake has an average depth of 1.3 meters (4 ft 3 in) and a maximum depth of 4.5 meters (15 ft). It is 240 meters (790 ft) long, and its shoreline measures 810 meters (2,660 ft).

== See also ==
- List of lakes of Estonia
