= César Malan =

Swiss Protestant minister and hymn-writer

Henri Abraham César Malan (July 7, 1787 – May 8, 1864) was a Swiss Protestant minister and hymn-writer.

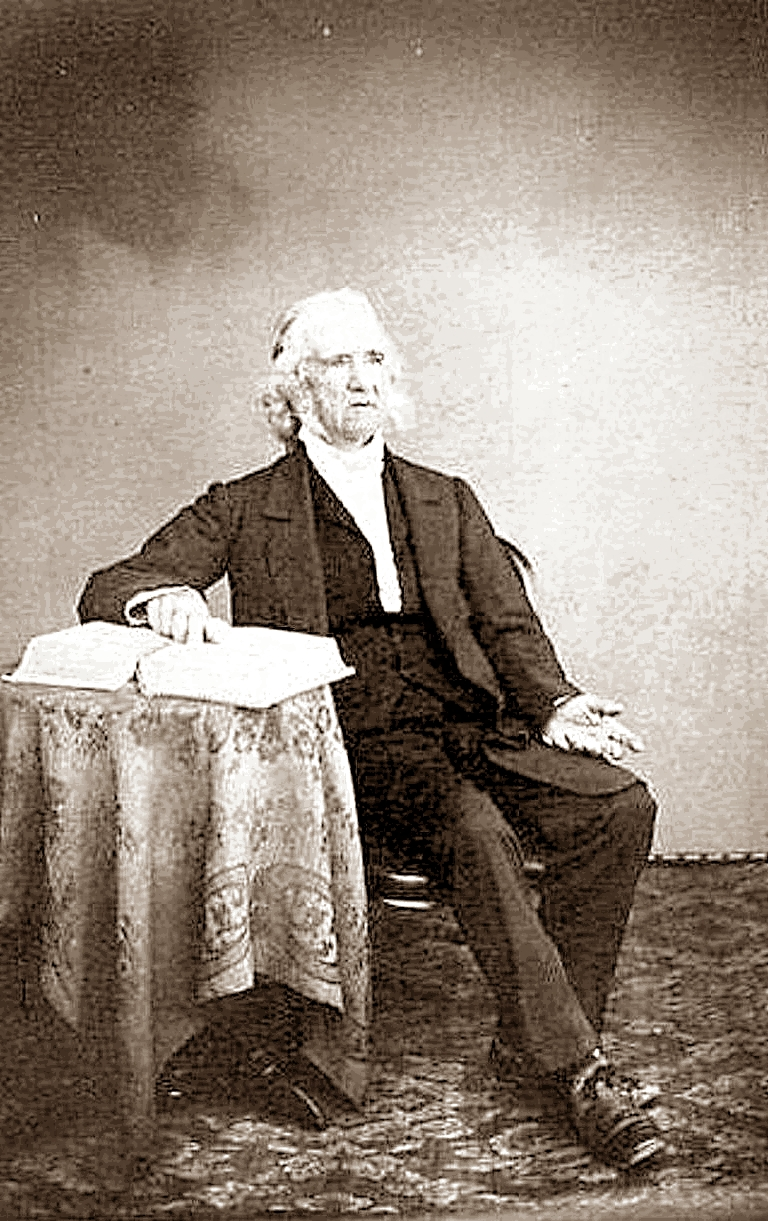
César Malan, circa 1863

== Life ==
Malan was born in Geneva, Republic of Geneva and was a believing Christian from childhood. After completing his education, he went to Marseilles, France, intending to learn business. But soon after, he entered the by then rationalistic Geneva Academy in preparation for the ministry. He was ordained in 1810.

Malan was part of the Société des Amis, a group of conservative evangelicals at Geneva, which included Merle D'Aubigne, Louis Gaussen, the Monod brothers and others. In 1816–1817 during a visit to Geneva, Scotsman Robert Haldane met up with this group on a regular basis and taught through the letter to the Romans. This catalysed a movement which has come to be known as the Le Réveil, bringing fresh life to the Protestant churches on the continent of Europe in Switzerland, France, the Netherlands and further afield.

Malan was suspended from ministry in 1818 for a forthright sermon preached in 1817 on justification by faith alone (doctrinal preaching was frowned upon at the time). Following an apology and restoration he was again suspended for similar preaching and formally defrocked in 1823.

In 1820 Malan founded an independent church, l'Église du témoignage. After a period of intense growth, from 1830 members from this church migrated to another independent church. Malan was known for his high Calvinist theology and somewhat autocratic manner, both of which contributed to the decline.

Malan travelled widely outside Geneva, making frequent trips to Britain (at least nine trips between 1819 and 1863). During his time in England and Scotland Malan showed his "effectiveness in personal interviews". Among others 'Rabbi' John Duncan owed his conversion to the ministry of the Genevan.

Caesar Malan was the father of orientalist and linguist Solomon Caesar Malan.

Malan died and is buried at Vandoeuvres, Switzerland

== Hymns ==
Malan was one of the originators of the hymn movement in the French Reformed Church and some of his hymns remain in use today:

“My Savior’s praises I will sing,
And all His love express;
Whose mercies each returning day
Proclaim His faithfulness.”

Everyday I Will Bless you - Hymn by Cesar Malan

Speaking of Caesar Malan's hymns, Julian, the hymnologist, wrote: "The spirit of Malan's hymns is perpetuated in the analysis of christian experience, the never-wearied delineation of the hopes and fears, the joys and sorrows of the believer's soul, which are still the staple of French Protestant hymns".

Malan was also a prolific author. He was very poetic in his writings and through the Spirit spoke to the heart compelling them to reconcile to God.
