= Lake Viitina =

Lake in Estonia

- Viitina järv (Estonian)
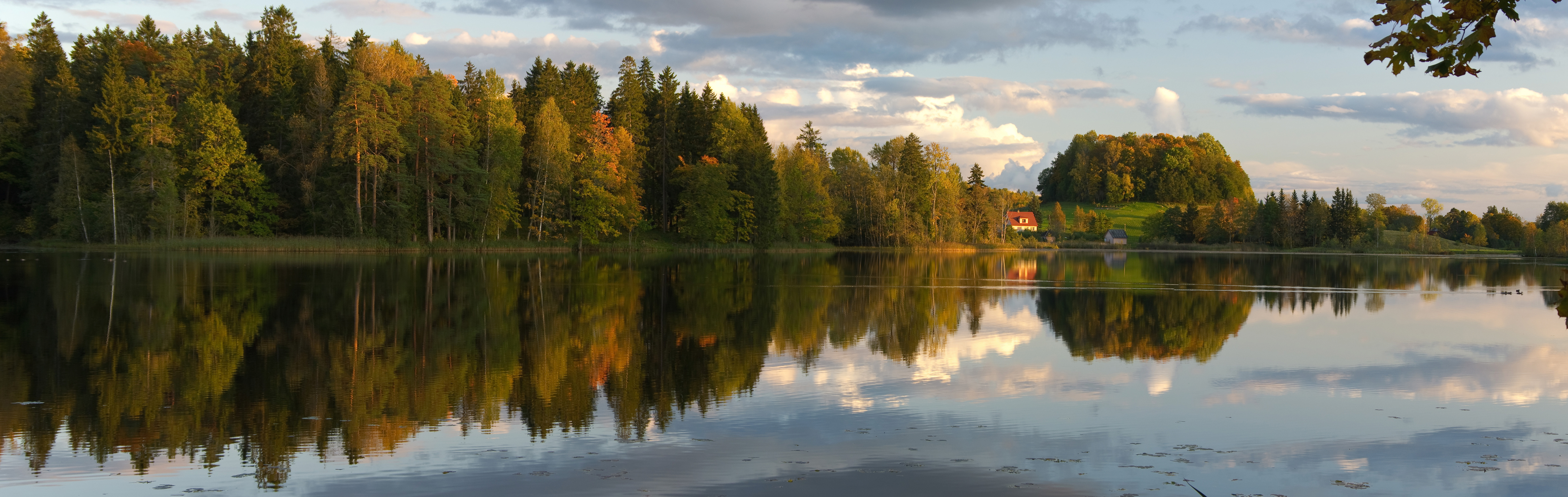
- Lake Viitina and Meegomägi in Rõuge Parish, Estonia

- Location within Estonia
- Location: Võru County
- Coordinates: 57°41′25″N 26°56′49″E
- Basin countries: Estonia
- Max. length: 660 meters (2,170 ft)
- Surface area: 13.0 hectares (32 acres)
- Average depth: 3.6 meters (12 ft)
- Max. depth: 11.3 meters (37 ft)
- Shore length^{1}: 3,090 meters (10,140 ft)
- Surface elevation: 177.5 meters (582 ft)
- Islands: 3
- ^{1} Shore length is not a well-defined measure.

Lake Viitina (Estonian: Viitina järv, also Kose järv, Mäejärv, or Suur Viitina järv) is a lake in Estonia. It is located in the village of Viitina in Rõuge Parish, Võru County. It is known for its dragnet fishing competitions.

== Physical description ==
The lake has an area of 13.0 hectares (32 acres), and it has three islands with a combined area of 0.4 hectares (0.99 acres). The lake has an average depth of 3.6 meters (12 ft) and a maximum depth of 11.3 meters (37 ft). It is 660 meters (2,170 ft) long, and its shoreline measures 3,090 meters (10,140 ft).

== See also ==
- List of lakes of Estonia
