= Barbara von Krüdener =

Baltic German mystic (1764–1824)

Barbara Juliane von Krüdener
- Freifrau von Krüdener
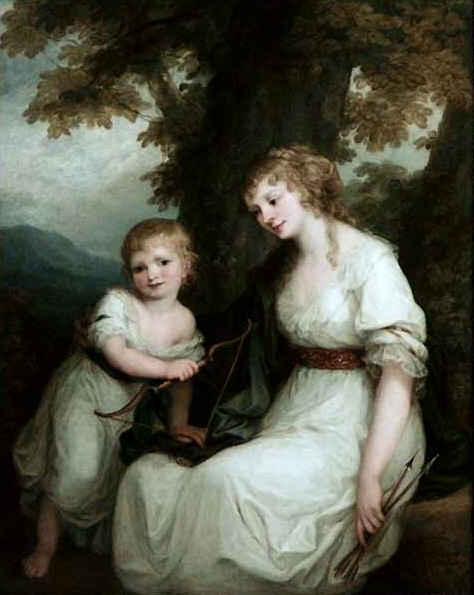
- Baroness von Krüdener and her son Paul, painted in 1786 by Angelica Kauffman

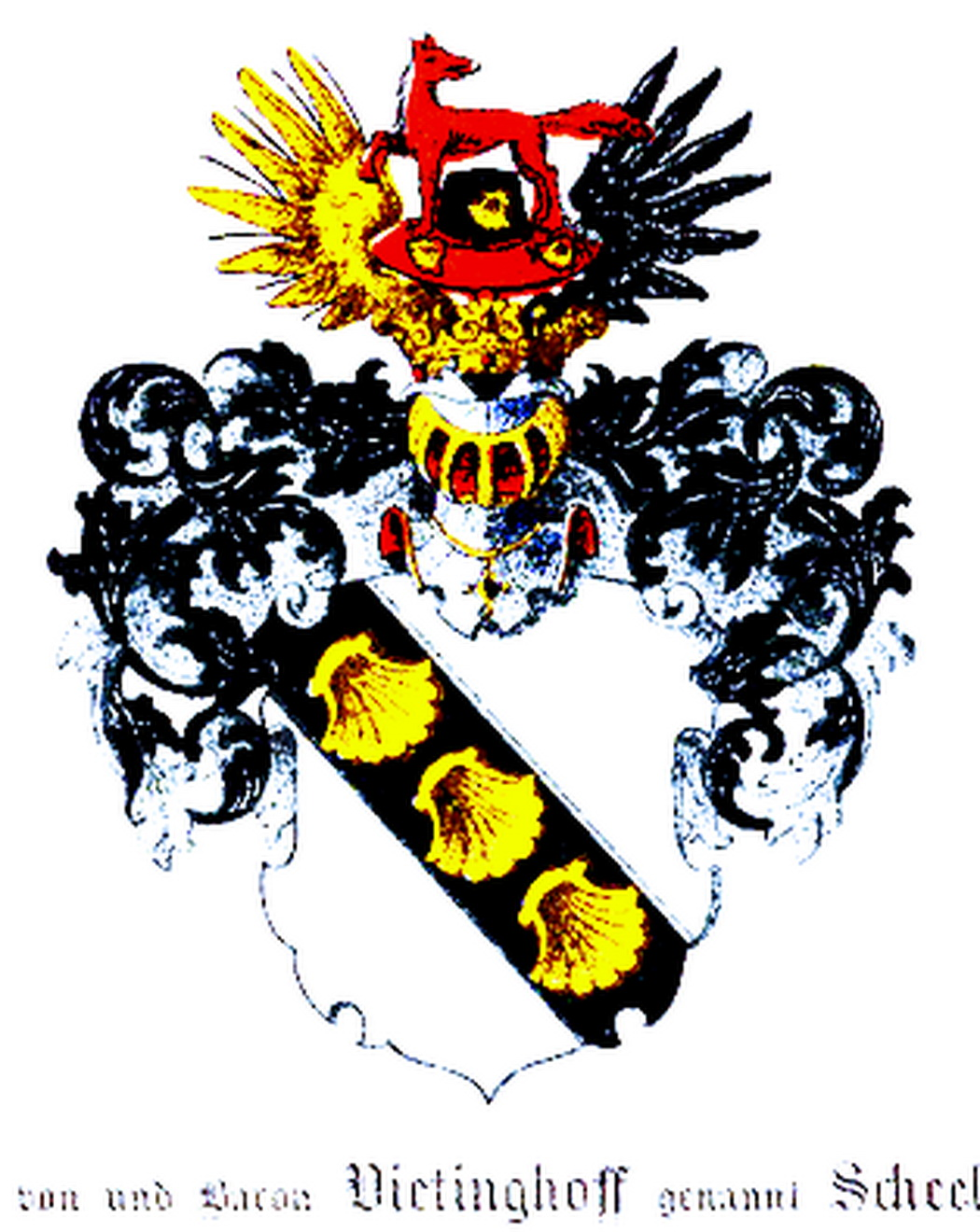
- Coat of arms
- Born: Beate Barbara Juliane Freiin von Vietinghoff genannt Scheel; 22 November [O.S. 11 November] 1764; Riga, Russian Empire
- Died: 25 December [O.S. 13 December] 1824; Belogorsk, Taurida Governorate, Russian Empire
- Noble family: Vietinghoff; Krüdener (by marriage)
- Spouse: Baron Burckhard Alexius Constantin von Krüdener
- Issue: 2
- Father: Baron Otto Hermann von Vietinghoff genannt Scheel
- Mother: Countess Anna Ulrika von Münnich

Beate Barbara Juliane Freifrau von Krüdener (née Freiin von Vietinghoff genannt Scheel; 22 November [O.S. 11 November] 1764 – 25 December [O.S. 13 December] 1824), often called by her formal French name, Madame de Krüdener, was a Baltic German religious mystic, author, and Pietist Lutheran theologian who exerted influence on wider European Protestantism, including the Swiss Reformed Church and the Moravian Church, and whose ideas influenced Tsar Alexander I of Russia.

== Family background ==
Baroness von Krüdener was born in Riga, Governorate of Livonia. Her father, Baron Otto Hermann von Vietinghoff genannt Scheel, who had fought as a colonel in Catherine II's wars, was one of the two councillors for Livonia and a man of immense wealth. He was a man of rationalistic views and a leading freemason. Her mother, the Countess Anna Ulrika von Münnich, was a granddaughter of Burkhard Christoph von Münnich, a celebrated Russian field marshal, and a strict Lutheran.

Barbe-Julie de Vietinghoff, better known as Madame von Krüdener (Mme. de Krüdener) later in life, but, as a child, referred to as Juliana, was one of five children born into the wealthy Vietinghoff family.

=== Father ===
Her father, Otto Hermann von Vietinghoff-Scheel, had started accruing his wealth from a young age, for as a young man, he proved to possess a knack for business. With his high ambitions, he entered into commercial enterprises that became highly successful. Some of his treasures included grand properties in Kosse (present-day Viitina, Estonia) and Marienburg, as well as his grandiose townhouse in Riga, where Barbe-Julie was born. Although he was never assigned an official title, he enjoyed the official rank as a privy counselor and as a senator and "would exclaim with pride 'I am Vietinghoff', and behave with all the arrogance of a great noble".

=== Mother ===
Barbe-Julie's mother, Anna Ulrika von Münnich von Vietinghoff-Scheel, was herself born into nobility. Her grandfather, the famed Field Marshal Burkhard Christoph von Münnich, despite having been exiled for many years in Siberia, had led many successful campaigns against the Tartars and the Turks. Catherine II also made him one of her favorites, although, sometimes the status was fickle. Mme. de Vietinghoff mirrored her grandfather's success in her own household, as a mother of five (she bore two sons and three daughters), she was extremely dedicated, despite the death in infancy of her first son, and her physically handicapped eldest daughter (who was both mute and deaf, and whom the family eventually placed in an asylum in 1777).

== Education ==
Her education, according to her own account, consisted of lessons in French spelling, deportment and sewing. At an early age, Barbe-Julie began learning French and German. The former allowed her access to the writings of the great philosophers, such as Voltaire and the Encyclopedists. It also gave her access to French culture, which her parents, along with other nobles, attempted to emulate and imitate. The importance of French ideals and culture seem to have replaced a need for religious studies, and because both of her parents were of German background. In spite of the quotation given ("it still remains unclear as to whether or not the Vietinghoff family were of Orthodox or Lutheran faith") the Vietinghoff family certainly was of Lutheran faith.

== Marriage ==
Although Barbe-Julie "was still an overgrown, undeveloped, silent girl, with a rather large nose and an uncertain complexion, [she possessed] ample promises of future beauty in her big blue eyes and curling chestnut hair, and in her singularly well-shaped hands and arms". Her potential beauty, combined with her being the heir to her parents’ wealth, resulted in an onslaught of marriage proposals. Her parents arranged for her to be married to the local neighborhood baron despite Barbe-Julie's incessant protesting.

Seeing no way out of her situation, the young baroness first started conversing with God. She begged him to save her from this horrid situation. He answered her with a case of the measles that left her less attractive (at least temporarily), which became at least a part of the baron's incentive to politely decline the marriage proposal. As a result, Barbe-Julie began to believe that she personally had a divine connection with God.

However, when Baron Burckhard Alexius Constantin von Krüdener, a widower sixteen years her senior, sought her hand, she had no such qualms. He was a well-educated (he attended the University of Leipzig), and a well-traveled man, who, like her father, was in favour with Catherine II. However, the baron, a diplomatist of distinction, was cold and reserved, while Barbe-Julie was frivolous, pleasure-loving, and possessed of an insatiable thirst for attention and flattery; and the strained relations due to this incompatibility of temper were made worse by her limitless extravagance, which constantly involved the young baroness and her husband in financial difficulties. At first, all went well. This was due to the fact that despite having an older husband for whom she did not possess any passionate feelings, his title and position in society were such that he could provide her whatever she might desire. At the same time, she endowed him with an even higher social status because of the social standing of her own family. However, this socially advantageous exchange left, for the baroness, much to be desired. Despite being materially pleased she was romantically unsatisfied. Her "earliest griefs arose from the fact, that, in her youthful inexperience, having chosen with her head, she expected at the same time to satisfy the longings of a singularly romantic heart". First she would pretend that her husband was something that he was not: a lover. This is especially evident in her description of him in her book. "The glowing description of the Count in Valérie represents Baron Krüdener more as his wife’s ardent imagination loved to picture him, than as he really was. The truth is, he did not lend himself readily to the role of a hero of romance". These notions, as well as the separation between her real husband and her fictional husband helped lead to marital instability and to the eventual love affairs she had with others.

On January 31, 1784, a son was born to them, named Paul after the grand-duke Paul (afterward emperor), who acted as god-father. The same year Baron Krüdener became ambassador at Venice, later (1786) at Munich where he remained until transferred to Copenhagen in 1787.

In 1787 the birth of a daughter (Juliette) aggravated the nervous disorders from which the baroness had for some time been suffering, and it was decided that she must go to the south for her health; she accordingly left, with her infant daughter and her stepdaughter Sophie. In 1789 she was at Paris when the Estates General met; a year later, at Montpellier, she met a young cavalry captain, Charles Louis de Frégeville, and a passionate attachment sprang up between them. They returned together to Copenhagen, where the baroness told her husband that her heart could no longer be his. The baron was coldly kind; he refused to hear of a divorce and attempted to arrange a modus vivendi, which was facilitated by the departure of de Frégeville for the war. All was useless; Juliana refused to remain at Copenhagen, and, setting out on her travels, visited Riga, St. Petersburg — where her father had become a senator of Berlin — Leipzig and Switzerland. In 1794 her husband became ambassador at Madrid. In 1800 her husband became ambassador in Berlin, and she joined him there. But the stiff court society of Prussia was irksome to her; money difficulties continued; and by way of climax, the murder of the Tsar Paul, in whose favor Baron Krüdener had stood high, made the position of the ambassador extremely precarious. The baroness seized the occasion to leave for the baths of Teplitz, whence she wrote to her husband that the doctors had ordered her to winter in the south. He died on June 14, 1802, without ever having seen her again.

== Religious development ==
Towards the end of the Napoleonic wars religious thought was in tune with the general disillusionment with the ideals of the French Revolution, and thus a search for an alternative. She had an influence on the Swiss Réveil, and for a time her ideas had a profound effect on Alexander I of Russia. Through her contact with the Russian Emperor she and Henri-Louis Empaytaz, a member of the Réveil, were in part responsible for the religious aspects of the Holy Alliance.

Meanwhile, the baroness had been reveling in the intellectual society of Coppet and of Paris. She was now thirty-six; her charms were fading, but her passion for admiration survived. She had tried the effect of the shawl dance, in imitation of Emma, Lady Hamilton; she now sought fame in literature, and in 1803, after consulting Chateaubriand and other writers of distinction, published her Valérie, a sentimental romance, of which under a thin veil of anonymity she herself was the heroine. In January 1804 she returned to Riga, Livonia.

At Riga occurred her conversion. A gentleman of her acquaintance when about to salute her fell dying at her feet. The shock overset her not too well-balanced mind; she sought for consolation and found it in the ministrations of her shoemaker, an ardent disciple of the Moravian Brethren. Though she had "found peace", however, the disorder of her nerves continued and she was ordered by her doctor to the baths of Wiesbaden.

At Königsberg she had an interview with Queen Louise, and, more important still, with one Adam Müller, a rough peasant, to whom God had supposedly revealed a prophetic mission to King Frederick William III. Chiliasm was in the air. Napoleon was evidently Antichrist, and the latter days were about to be accomplished. Under the influence of the pietistic movement, the belief was widely spread, in royal courts, in-country parsonages, in peasant novels: a man would be raised up from the north from the rising of the sun (Isa. xli. 25); Antichrist would be overthrown, and Christ would come to reign a thousand years upon the earth. The interview determined the direction of the baroness's religious development.

A short visit to the Moravians at Herrnhut followed; then she went, via Dresden, to Karlsruhe, to sit at the feet of Heinrich Jung-Stilling who had great influence at the court of Baden and Stockholm and St. Petersburg. By him she was instructed in the chiliastic faith and in the mysteries of the supernatural world. Then, hearing that a certain pastor in the Vosges, Jean Frédéric Fontaines, was prophesying and working miracles, she determined to go to him. On June 5, 1801, accordingly, she arrived at the Protestant parsonage of Sainte-Marie-aux-Mines, accompanied by her daughter Juliette, her stepdaughter Sophie and a Russian valet.

This remained for two years her headquarters. Fontaines, half-charlatan, half-dupe, had introduced into his household a prophetess named Marie Gottliebin Kummer whose visions, carefully calculated for her own purposes, became the oracle of the divine mysteries for the baroness. Under this influence, she believed more firmly than ever in the approaching millennium and her own mission to proclaim it. Her rank, her reckless charities, and her exuberant eloquence produced a great effect on the simple country folk; and when, in 1809, it was decided to found a colony of the elect in order to wait for the coming of the Lord, many wretched peasants sold or distributed all they possessed and followed the baroness and Fontaines into Württemberg, where the settlement was established at Catharinenplaisir and the château of Bonnigheim, only to be dispersed (May 1) by an unsympathetic government.

Further wanderings followed: to Lichtenthal near Baden; to Karlsruhe and the congenial society of pietistic princesses; to Riga, where she was present at the deathbed of her mother (January 24, 1811); then back to Karlsruhe. The influence of Fontaines, to whom she had been "spiritually married" (Madame Fontaines being content with the part of Martha in the household, so long as the baroness's funds lasted), had now waned, and she had fallen under that of Johann Kaspar Wegelin (1766–1833), a pious linen-draper of Strasbourg, who taught her the sweetness of complete annihilation of the will and mystic death. Her preaching and her indiscriminate charities now began to attract curious crowds from afar; and her appearance everywhere was accompanied by an epidemic of visions and prophesyings, which culminated in the appearance in 1811 of the comet, a sure sign of the approaching end.

In 1812 she was at Strassburg, whence she paid more than one visit to J. F. Oberlin, the famous pastor of Waldersbach in Steintal (Ban de la Roche), and where she had the glory of converting her host, Adrien de Lazay-Marnesia, the prefect. In 1813 she was at Geneva, where she established the faith of a band of young pietists in revolt against the Calvinist Church authorities notably Henri-Louis Empaytaz, afterwards, the companion of her crowning evangelistic triumph. In September 1814 she was again at Waldbach, where Empaytaz had preceded her; and at Strassburg, where the party was joined by Franz Karl von Berckheim, who afterwards married Juliette. At the end of the year she returned with her daughters and Empeytaz to Baden, a fateful migration.

The empress Elizabeth of Russia was now at Karlsruhe, and she and the pietist ladies of her entourage hoped that the emperor Alexander might find at the hands of Madame de Krüdener the peace which an interview with Jung-Stilling had failed to bring him. The baroness herself wrote urgent letters to Roxandre de Stourdza, sister of Alexandre Stourdza the tsar's Romanian secretary, begging her to procure an interview. There seemed to be no result, but the correspondence paved the way for the opportunity which a strange chance was to give her of realizing her ambition.

== Association with Tsar Alexander ==
In the spring of 1815 the baroness was settled at Schlüchtern, a Baden enclave in Württemberg, busy persuading the peasants to sell all and fly from the wrath to come. Near this, at Heilbronn, the emperor Alexander established his headquarters on June 4. That very night the baroness sought and obtained an interview. To the tsar, who had been brooding alone over an open Bible, her sudden arrival seemed an answer to his prayers; for three hours the prophetess preached her strange gospel, while the most powerful man in Europe sat, his face buried in his hands, sobbing like a child; until at last he declared that he had "found peace".

At the tsar's request, she followed him to Heidelberg and later to Paris, where she was lodged at the Hotel Montchenu, next door to the imperial headquarters in the Élysée Palace. A private door connected the establishments, and every evening the emperor went to take part in the prayer-meetings conducted by the baroness and Empeytaz. Chiliasm seemed to have found an entrance into the high councils of Europe, and the baroness von Krüdener had become a political force to be reckoned with. Admission to her religious gatherings was sought by a crowd of people celebrated in the intellectual and social world; Chateaubriand came, and Benjamin Constant, Madame Recamier, the Duchesse de Bourbon, and Madame de Duras. The fame of the wonderful conversion, moreover, attracted other members of the chiliastic fraternity, among them Fontaines, who brought with him the prophetess Marie Kummer.

In this religious forcing-house, the idea of the Holy Alliance germinated and grew to rapid maturity. On September 26 the portentous proclamation, which was to herald the opening of a new age of peace and goodwill on earth, was signed by the sovereigns of Russia, Austria and Prussia. Its authorship has ever been a matter of dispute. Madame de Krüdener herself claimed that she had suggested the idea, and that Alexander had submitted the draft for her approval. This is probably correct, though the tsar later, when he had recovered his mental equilibrium, reproved her for her indiscretion in talking of the matter. His eyes, indeed, had begun to be opened before he left Paris, and Marie Kummer was the unintentional cause. At the very first séance the prophetess, whose revelations had been praised by the baroness in extravagant terms, had the evil inspiration to announce in her trance to the emperor that it was God's will that he should endow the religious colony to which she belonged! Alexander merely remarked that he had received too many such revelations before to be impressed. The baroness's influence was shaken but not destroyed, and before he left Paris Alexander gave her a passport to Russia. She was not to see him again.

She left Paris on October 22, 1815, intending to travel to St. Petersburg by way of Switzerland. The tsar, however, offended by her indiscretions and sensible of the ridicule which his relations with her had brought upon him, showed little disposition to hurry her arrival. She remained in Switzerland, where she presently fell under the influence of an unscrupulous adventurer named J. G. Kellner. For months Empeytaz, an honest enthusiast, struggled to save her from this man's clutches but in vain. Kellner too well knew how to flatter the baroness's inordinate vanity: the author of the Holy Alliance could be none other than the "woman clothed with the sun" from the Book of Revelation.

She wandered with Kellner from place to place, proclaiming her mission, working miracles, persuading her converts to sell all and follow her. Crowds of beggars and rapscallions of every description gathered wherever she went, supported by the charities squandered from the common fund. She became a nuisance to the authorities and a menace to the peace; Württemberg had expelled her, and the example was followed by every Swiss canton she entered in turn. At last, in May 1818, she set out for her estate in Kosse, Livonia (now Viitina, Estonia), accompanied by Kellner and a remnant of the elect.

The emperor Alexander having opened the Crimea to German and Swiss chiliasts in search of a land of promise, the baroness's son-in-law Berckheim and his wife now went there to help establish the new colonies. In November 1820 the baroness at last went herself to St. Petersburg, where Berckheim was lying ill. She was there when the news arrived of Ypsilanti's invasion of the Danubian principalities, which opened the Greek War of Independence. She at once proclaimed the divine mission of the Tsar to take up arms on behalf of Christendom. Alexander, however, had long since exchanged her influence for that of Metternich, and he was far from anxious to be forced into even a holy war. To the baroness's overtures he replied in a long and polite letter, the gist of which was that she must leave St. Petersburg at once. In 1823 the death of Kellner, whom to the last she regarded as a saint, was a severe blow to her. Her health was failing, but she allowed herself to be persuaded by Princess Galitzine to accompany her to the Crimea, where she had established a Swiss colony. Here, at Karasubazar, she died on December 25, 1824.

== Character assessment ==
Charles Augustin Sainte-Beuve wrote of Madame de Krüdener:

Elle avait un immense besoin que le monde s'occupât d'elle ... ; l'amour propre, toujours l'amour propre ...

— Sainte-Beuve (1852).

A kindlier epitaph written in her own words, uttered after the revelation of the misery of the Crimean colonists had at last opened her eyes:

The good that I have done will endure; the evil that I have done (for how often have I not mistaken for the voice of God that which was no more than the result of my imagination and my pride) the mercy of God will blot out.

— Barbara von Krüdener.

Clarence Ford wrote in a Victorian biography:

Mme. de Krüdener, ... preserved a certain magnetic attraction up to the very last years of her life. Added to this she possess[ed] an extreme gracefulness of carriage and lightness of motion, which, together with her fair curling hair that fell in soft ringlets around her face, lent an air of unusual youthfulness to her appearance.

— Clarence Ford (1893).

== Works ==
- Valérie, ou, Lettres de Gustave de Linar à Ernst de G…, Paris, Henrichs, 1804. available onGallica archive.
- Écrits intimes et prophétiques de Madame de Krüdener, Paris, Éditions du Centre national de la recherche scientifique, 1975. Worldcat.
- Le Camp de Vertus, ou la Grande revue de l'armée russe, Lyon, Guyot frères, 1815. Available on Gallica archive.

== Books about her ==
- Madame de Krüdener et son temps, 1764-1824.Paris, Plon, 1961. Worldcat.
- Lady of the Holy Alliance. Ernest John Knapton: New York, Columbia University Press, 1939. Worldcat.

== Sources ==
- Ford, Clarence (1893), The Life and Letters of Madame De Krüdener, London: A. & C. Black
- Sainte-Beuve, Charles Augustin (January–March 1852), "Madame de Krudner et ce qu'en aurait dit Saint-Evremond" , Revue des deux Mondes, 1849-1855, 13: 1026
- Stunt, Timothy C. F. (2000), From awakening to secession: radical evangelicals in Switzerland and Britain, 1815-35 (illustrated ed.), Continuum International Publishing Group, p. 30, ISBN 978-0-567-08719-5
- Phillips, Walter Alison (1911a). "Alexander I." . In Chisholm, Hugh (ed.). Encyclopædia Britannica. Vol. 1 (11th ed.). Cambridge University Press. pp. 556–559. This work in turn cites:
  - Empaytaz, H. L. (1840), Notice sur Alexandre Empereur de Russie (2nd ed.), Paris

Attribution

- "Криденер, Варвара Юлия" . Brockhaus and Efron Encyclopedic Dictionary (in Russian). 1906.
