= Réveil =

The Réveil (French for "revival", "awakening") of 1814 was a revival movement within the Swiss Reformed Church of western Switzerland and some Reformed communities in southeastern France.

== Origins ==
The supporters were also called pejoratively momiers. The movement was initially prompted by small Moravian communities implanted by earlier Moravian missionary efforts and much helped by British Presbyterians such as Robert Haldane or Henry Drummond, or Methodists such as Charles Cook; several members of Free Church of Scotland moved over to the Continent after Napoleon's fall.

Among the leading personalities of the Réveil are Henri-Louis Empaytaz, César Malan, Louis Gaussen, Ami Bost, Henri Pyt, Antoine Jean-Louis Galland and Adolphe Monod as well as the controversial Barbara von Krüdener. Having accused the Protestant state church of apostasy from true Christianity, most of the Geneva momiers walked out of the State church in 1831 and set up the Evangelical Society in Geneva, with its own "preacher school" built in 1832. In 1848 the various dissident congregations united to form an evangelical Free Church (Église libre), which since has existed along with the established church (Église nationale). In the canton of Vaud was also formed a Reformed Free Church, whose spiritual father was Alexandre Vinet.

In France, several regions were reached by the Réveil, including Paris where a very influential church, la Chapelle Taitbout, gathered numerous members of the high bourgeoisie and nobility of the time. Other preachers kept their activities to a given area such as Felix Neff, called the "Apostle of the Alps", who preached in mountain area in the border of France, Switzerland, and Piedmont, and among the Waldensians.

== Influence ==
Historians of Réveil recognise that the movement had a deep influence on Protestantism in France and Switzerland. It has for instance been noted that French protestant clergy more than doubled its numbers from 305 in 1829 to 765 in 1843. Although there were also divisions and disputes, the Réveil modernised protestantism in many ways:

- It created new institutions such as the singing of new hymns (instead of just using the Psalms), Sunday schools, Bible study classes or meetings, prayer meetings, etc.
- It gave an enhanced position to women, who were sometimes key figures of the movement, such as Rosine de Chabaud-Latour, Mrs Jules Mallet, born Émilie Oberkampf, Henriette André-Walther, Caroline Malvesin or Catherine Booth-Clibborn, courageous founder of the Salvation Army in France and Switzerland.
- It allowed protestant churches to adapt to rural exodus by opening new parishes in the cities.
- It opened the door to Christianisme social and Réveil-inspired businessmen will be praised for their social efforts, including by Pope Paul VI, who will particularly name Daniel Legrand, a disciple of J. F. Oberlin.
- It created a series of movements (such as scouts) which helped spread the Christian Protestant message across society, and it was a major influence on the early Red Cross movement.
- It created foreign missions organisations, such as the Société des Missions évangéliques de Paris

== Other countries ==
The Franco-Swiss Réveil was contemporary and analogous to the German Erweckungsbewegung and shared the social concern of its leaders like J. F. Oberlin. A preacher influenced by the Réveil was the German-speaking Swiss minister Samuel Heinrich Froehlich founder of the Neutäufer in Europe and the Apostolic Christian Church in the United States. Many of the Continental "awakened" joined the Plymouth Brethren.
