= Ivana Markova =

British psychologist (1938–2024)

Ivana Markova FBA FBPsS FRSE
- Born: 2 October 1938; Tábor, Czechoslovakia
- Died: 1 December 2024 (aged 86); Cambridge, England
- Education: Charles University
- Scientific career
- Fields: social psychology
- Workplaces: University of Stirling

Ivana Marková FBA (2 October 1938 – 1 December 2024) was a Czech-born British social psychologist known for her work on language and the constructs of communication. Markova died on 1 December 2024, at the age of 86.

== Education and academic career ==
She was born in Czechoslovakia and studied philosophy and psychology at Charles University in Prague. In 1967 she moved to the United Kingdom. She initially worked as Research Fellow at the Industrial Training Research Unit, University of London (1968–70) before moving to the University of Stirling, from which she retired in 2003 as an emeritus professor. After her retirement the university established the Ivana Markova Prize for the BSc Psychology Final Year student demonstrating outstanding wider achievement. She then took up the post of visiting professor in the Department of Psychological and Behavioural Science and Research Associate in the Centre for Philosophy of Natural and Social Sciences at the London School of Economics. She was also a Senior Member of Wolfson College, Cambridge.

She served on various national and international committees, e.g. she was a member of the Chief Scientist's Health Services Research Committee, Scottish Home and Health Department, a chairperson of the Social Psychology Section of the British Psychological Society, President of Section J (Psychology) of the British Association for the Advancement of Science, a member of the Scientific Committee of the Academia Istropolitana, a newly established Centre of Advanced Studies in Central Europe, Bratislava, Slovakia.

== Research ==
Her main theoretical research interests were the ontology and epistemology of theory in social psychology, and the interdependence between social thinking, dialogue and semiotics. Empirical research concerned social representations of democracy, individualism and responsibility in post communist Europe and the study of dialogues between people with impaired speech and their partners. In the 1990s she became increasingly interested in developing a dialogical approach to the study of social representations.

== Awards ==
- 2019: Honorary doctorate: University of Neuchâtel
- 1994: Honorary doctorate: Linköping University
- 1999 - Fellow of the British Academy
- 1997 - Fellow of the Royal Society of Edinburgh
- Fellow of the British Psychological Society

== Personal life ==
She was the mother of Professor Ivana S. Marková, a distinguished psychiatrist in her own right.

== Death ==
Ivana Marková died on 01 December 2024 and was memorialized by the London School of Economics where she had served as a Visiting Professor.

== Books ==
- The Making of a Dialogical Theory: Social Representations and Communication. Cambridge: Cambridge University Press, 2023.
- The Dialogical Mind: Common Sense and Ethics. Cambridge: Cambridge University Press, 2016.
- Trust and distrust: Socio-cultural perspectives (edited with A. Gillespie). Greenwich, CT: Information Age Publishing, 2007.
- Dialogue in focus groups: exploring socially shared knowledge (with P. Linell & M. Grossen). London: Equinox, 2007.
- Making of Modern Social Psychology: The Hidden Story of How an International Social Science Was Created (with Serge Moscovici). Cambridge and Oxford: Polity Press, 2006.
- Trust and democratic transition in post-communist Europe (edited). Oxford: Oxford University Press, 2004.
- Dialogicality and Social Representations. Cambridge: Cambridge University Press, 2003.
- Representations of health, illness and handicap (edited with R. Farr}. Amsterdam: Harwood Academic, 1995.
- Mutualities in dialogue (edited with C.F. Graumann & K. Foppa}. Cambridge: Cambridge University Press, 1995.
- Asymmetries in dialogue (edited with K. Foppa}. Hemel Hempstead: Harvester Wheatsheaf, 1991.
- Dynamics of dialogue (edited with K. Foppa). Prentice-Hall, 1990.
- Paradigms, thought and language. London: Wiley, 1982.
- Social context of language (edited). Chichester: Wiley, 1978.
