= Solomon Caesar Malan =

Swiss Anglican divine and polyglot

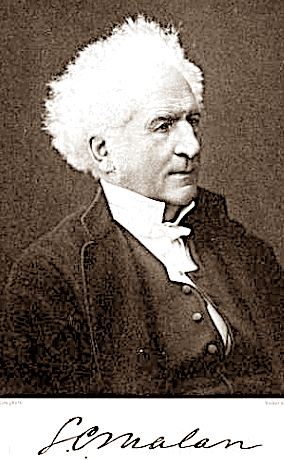
Solomon Caesar Malan, circa 1870s

Solomon Caesar Malan (22 April 1812 – 25 November 1894) D.D., Vicar of Broadwindsor, Prebendary of Sarum, was a Geneva-born Anglican divine, a polyglot and orientalist. He published around 50 works related to biblical studies and translations.

Malan's Original Notes on the Book of Proverbs (1889–1893) is now considered significant for his critical insights. Near the end of his life he gave to notable institutions, including a set of Tibetan sutras to the Hungarian Academy of Sciences, and most of his personal library to the Indian Institute in Oxford. It became the Malan Library, and after its dispersal in the 1960s, was recognized as foundational for the Oriental Division in the Bodleian Libraries.

== Early life in Geneva ==
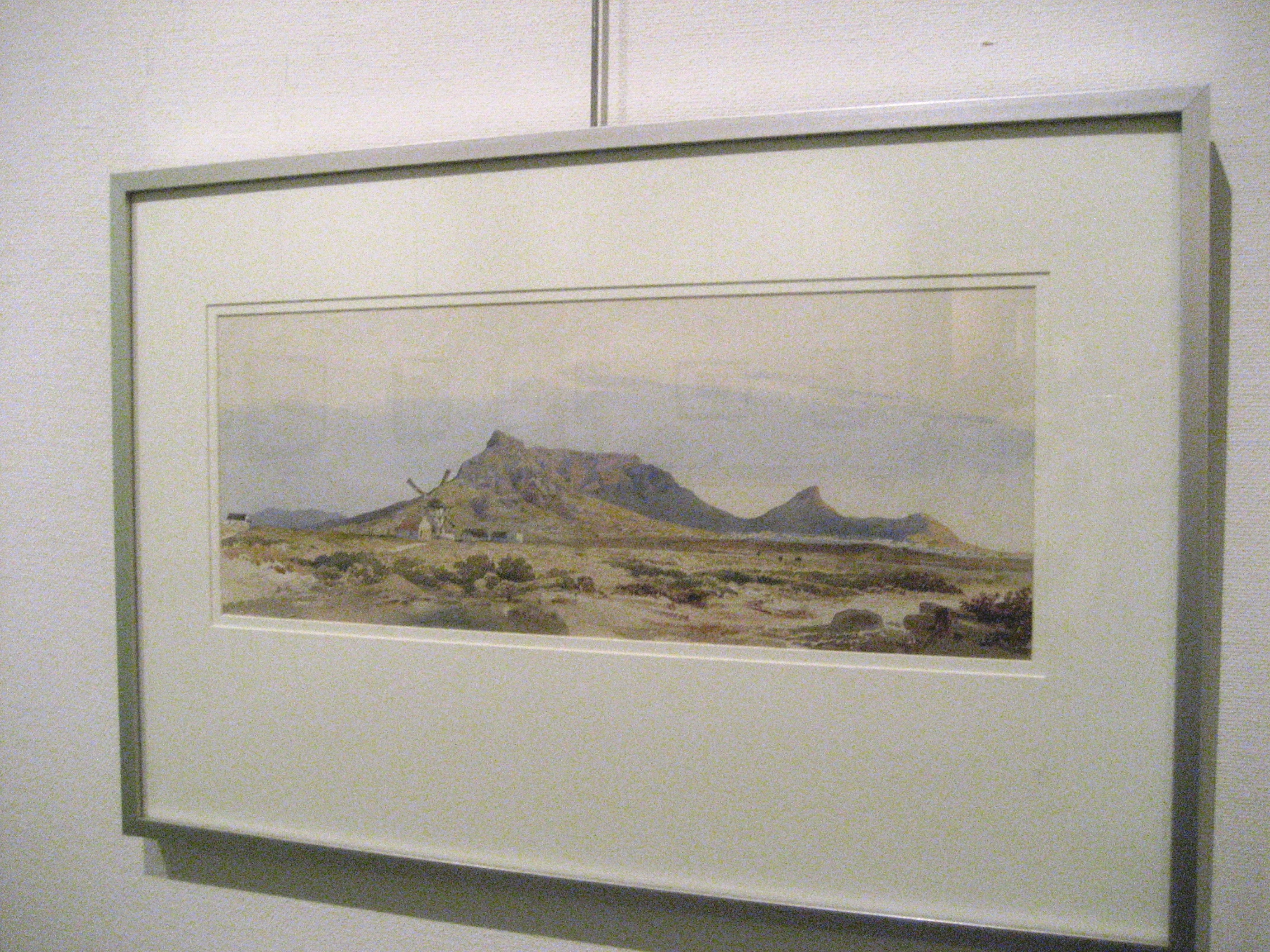
Table Mountain (Cape Town). Drawing by Solomon Malan (1839), now at Sasol Art Museum Stellenbosch

By birth a Genevan descended from an exiled French family, Malan was born as César Jean Salomon Malan in Geneva. He was the first of a dozen children born to his gifted father, Dr. Henri Abraham César Malan (1787–1864) and his Swiss wife, Salomé Georgette Jeanne Schönberger (1790-unknown). She is rarely mentioned in any of the published writings related to Solomon Caesar Malan's life.

His father was a counter-cultural theological teacher in the final years of Genevan city-state history and became a controversial Swiss religious leader, whose evangelical version of Protestant faith challenged the rationalized Enlightenment Calvinism that had become dominant in the first years of 19th century Geneva. Ultimately rejected by the Genevan Calvinist hierarchy as a minister in their community in 1818, the father Malan set up his own church community on his own property, offering a vital Christian alternative in worship to what was offered in the state church. Writing hymns in French that became famous for their theological vitality, and publishing numerous short stories and some larger works as a Swiss evangelical intellectual, the father Malan became known as an evangelical international missionary in various European countries, as well as in Great Britain, particularly within Scotland. His honorary doctorate was given by the University of Glasgow, indicating the level of respect he had attained outside of Switzerland.

This situation of social alienation and counter-cultural religious assertiveness profoundly shaped the early years and educational training of the first son, César Jean Salomon. The education his first son received was essentially a home education, in which César Jean Salomon thrived. Under his father's guidance, he initially learned Latin (his "father tongue" and first language), French, German and Italian. According to his son's biography, at the age of 18 César Jean Salomon Malan had already made progress in Sanskrit, Arabic and Hebrew.

In addition, however, he also was trained by his father in a wide variety of fine and technical arts. His lessons in sketching and watercolours were taught by a private tutor and bore extensive fruitfulness in much-appreciated sketches and paintings in his later years. During these formative years, César Jean Salomon also was taught botany, and because of his father's gift of a rather sophisticated workshop for his bright son, he learned skills in carpentry, bookbinding, and printing. As revealed later in his life, his bookbinding skills were aesthetically impressive. Also, the mature son Malan knew enough music theory and how to play some musical instruments to employ them in his ministry. Probably during this early period of his life, he had also begun to study calligraphy, an art in which he later excelled in numerous styles and languages.

Because of his father's growing international reputation as an evangelical theologian, there were a number of international guests who visited their Swiss Genevan home, and in that context, the eldest son met the first love of his life, the daughter of an English evangelical Anglican, Mary Marsh Mortlock (1813-1840). Though his father had hoped that the first son would follow him in his distinctive ministry in Geneva as what could be seen as a Free Church or Dissenter Christian community, César Jean Salomon chose another route that led him to leave Switzerland and his father's work.

== To Great Britain and formal education in Oxford ==
From his earliest youth, he manifested a remarkable faculty for the study of languages, but it was the romantic relationship he developed with Mary Mortlock that would reshape his destiny, move him to leave his father's home, and adopt the English name, Solomon Caesar Malan. After some difficult questions emerged regarding the romantic relationship between César Jean Salomon Malan and Mary Morlock, an agreement between the two fathers was reached, that included a way for the son Malan to attain a solid grasp of English, obtain a formal education, and marry. Mary's father agreed to support the young Malan's education if he could successfully matriculate into a college in Oxford. In order to do so, they agreed that he should serve as a family tutor in Great Britain for a period, so that he could become capable in English to sit for the university entrance examinations. If he succeeded in these matters, then it was also agreed that César and Mary could marry. What was an additional religious problem involved in these arrangements is that colleges in Oxford required that a person who graduated would agree with the principles of the Anglican faith, including its support for the English royal family, a principle that was opposed by Malan's father. Nevertheless, once the arrangements were settled, a new set of challenges and opportunities opened up for the life of the son who would subsequently be known as Solomon Caesar Malan.

As a consequence, when the young Malan was twenty years old, an arrangement was made for him in 1832 to travel to Scotland and serve as a tutor in the marquis of Tweeddale's family. The university examinations occurred the following year, but the young Malan was still self-consciously lacking confidence in the quality of his English. Hoping to overcome that difficulty, he petitioned the examiners to allow him to do his paperwork during the examination in French, German, Spanish, Italian, Latin or Greek, rather than in English. Though his request was not granted, the young Swiss scholar managed to pass. Consequently, in 1833 he matriculated at St Edmund Hall, Oxford. A year later in 1834, Solomon and Mary were married, and the relatively young Swiss student began to thrive in his studies.

Unquestionably, the young Malan took up his opportunity to study in Oxford with a vigour and intensity driven by both an insatiable desire to learn all that he could and to please those who had agreed to support him and his wife. Unfortunately, this led to his losing sight in his left eye during those years, a threat to his gifted scholarly intentions, but one that did not ultimately obstruct either his personal motivation to learn or his intense self-imposed disciplines. In fact, during his years of study in Oxford, he earned two major scholarships: the Boden scholarship for Sanskrit in 1834, and the Pusey and Ellerton scholarship for Hebrew in 1837. Obviously, this indicates something about his level of scholarly attainment in those two classical languages. When he graduated in 1837, it was not with extraordinary honours, but he did achieve a 2nd class in Literae humaniores.

Unknown to many others at the time, Solomon Caesar Malan took it upon himself as a newcomer to Oxford to become an expert in proverbial literature. Using the Hebrew biblical text of the proverbs, which are mostly attributed to his namesake, King Solomon, as the basis for this personal research project, Malan took this task also as an act of devotion to the biblical text that he, his father, and his wife all considered to be divine revelation. As the inside flyleaf to the manuscript version of his Original Notes on the Book of Proverbs reveals, he began the multilingual recordings of parallel or antagonistic proverbs in 1833, the year he initiated his university studies in Oxford. For just over sixty years he devoted himself to this study, ultimately donating the huge manuscript that he had produced at the end of his life to the Bodleian Library in Oxford in 1894, just a few months before his death.

Originally pursued as a matter of interest in comparative wisdom literature and an enrichment of his own biblical convictions, and so never meant to be published, later in his life others urged him to consider publishing some account of this unusual intellectual journey. Consequently, during the last decade of his life Malan figured out how he might approach that major effort, and so ended up making it his magnum opus, publishing the results of his six decades of labour in an English translated version in three volumes, a matter that will be discussed in greater detail below. So, even as Solomon and Mary were starting their young family, the young Oxford scholar's interest in biblical studies and proverbial wisdom had begun in earnest while he was studying at St. Edmund Hall.

== A missionary-educator in Calcutta ==
Because the young Malan couple were evangelical in their Protestant faith, and had become oriented to a low-church Anglican expression of Christianity during their residence in Oxford, it became possible for the young Swiss university graduate from Oxford to apply to the [Anglican] Church Missionary Society to take up a position as a missionary-educator. Though this was an extraordinary request from a 25-year-old foreign student in 1837, the need for qualified missionary educators in India, where he applied, was profound, and so arrangements were made so that his application could be accepted. By early 1838 the Malan family was on a ship headed to India, arriving in May 1838, so that he could take up the position of Professor of Classical Languages at Bishop's College, Calcutta. Once they had arrived, Malan began his educational work and a month later was made a deacon of the Anglican church, and so could be formally recognized in his position at Bishop's College as an Anglican church leader.

A young faculty member eager to serve, and to throw himself into his work with an intensity that had previously cost him the sight in his left eye, Malan added to his duties as a lecturer also his musical talents on organ, the responsibilities of leading chapel, and was also made the Secretary to the Bengal Branch of the Royal Asiatic Society. Notably, by November 1838 he and his family were suffering physically from illnesses, and Malan himself was once again troubled with visual problems that greatly hindered his work. Ultimately he and his family were required by a physician to depart for a milder climate in order to recuperate. Joining his wife and three sons on their voyage to South Africa in early 1839, Malan agreed for Mary and their sons to travel back to Great Britain while he returned to Calcutta. Enduring work back in Bishop's College from November 1839 till April 1840, Malan was once again forced to leave Calcutta because of his deteriorating health. Later in 1840, while recuperating in South Africa, Malan learned that Mary had died after returning to Great Britain.

This traumatic context of Malan's short-lived tenure as a missionary educator in Calcutta should not be understated or overlooked, because his acquisition of living and ancient "eastern languages" began in earnest during this period. From a younger Chinese student, whose name in Cantonese was Ho Tsun-sheen (Mandarin, He Jinshan, 1817-1871), and who attended Bishop's College at that time as the only person of Chinese ethnicity there, Malan learned the rudiments and grammar of ancient and contemporary Chinese writing. Additionally, from the rather shy and reclusive librarian assistant at the Library of the Royal Asiatic Society in Calcutta, a Hungarian named Alexander Csoma de Kőrös (1784-1842), he not only learned foundational knowledge of both Tibetan language and Tibetan Buddhism, but also was given a cache of nearly forty Tibetan manuscripts Csoma de Kőrös had collected from his interactions with Tibetan monks in the area of Ladahk. Subsequently, Malan would demonstrate his competence in reading texts in Chinese and Tibetan that stemmed from these initial personal encounters with those who could teach him those languages.

In addition, Malan managed to learn and continue to collect and study texts written in Indian sub-continental languages from this period, so that within his own personal library he had collected books and manuscripts from thirteen Indian languages. One might say that Malan's relatively brief experiences in India ignited his appetite for foreign language learning in ways that would have been impossible otherwise.

== Traumatic transformations and vicarate in Broadwindsor ==
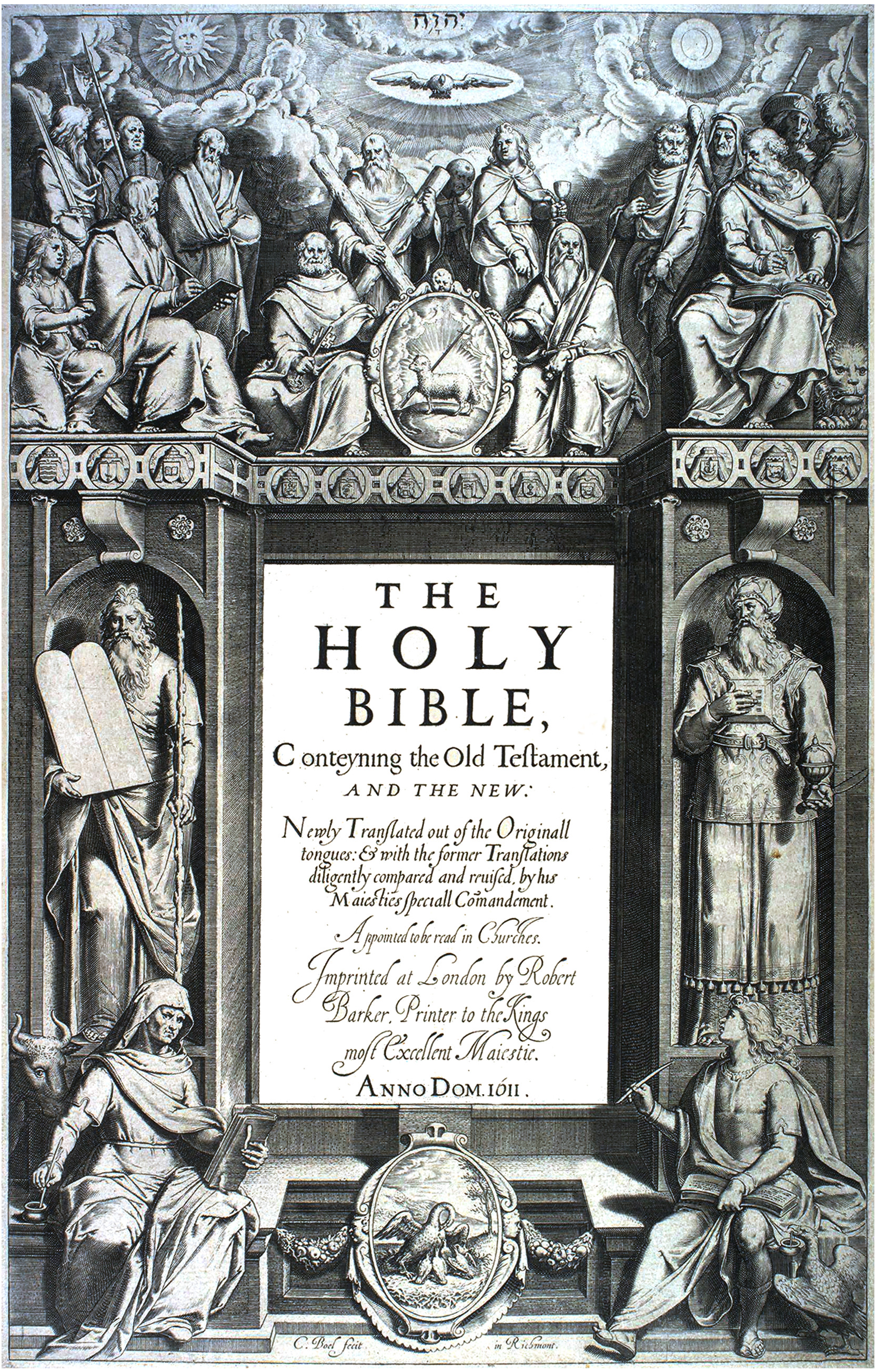
King James Version of the Bible. First edition title page.

The death of his young wife, Mary, required Malan to reconsider his life's vocation and adjust to the needs of his sons. Having learned of her death while in South Africa for his second period of recuperation, Malan made arrangements for the care of his sons, and worked out his grief in part by a means that would become a repeated pattern in his later years: obtaining permission to travel internationally. In the early 1840s, he travelled for the first time to Palestine, carrying along with him a sketchbook in which he documented his itinerary with sketches and watercolours. Returning to England with a renewed will, he cared for his sons while serving in two curacies, and in 1843 was married to the daughter of an Anglican leader, Caroline Seline Mount (1821-1911). Being nine years younger than Malan himself, Caroline Malan cared for the boys from his previous marriage and became mother of at least five other children.

After serving as a subordinate priest for several years, Malan was offered in 1845 the vicarate in Broadwindsor, Dorset, one that included a sizeable home and provided a handsome income that could house his growing family. Having settled into this ministry along with his family, Malan remained affiliated as vicar of this countryside congregation for four decades, a period he once referred to as his own "forty years in the wilderness." In spite of this self-deprecating reference to Broadwindsor and his ministry there, Malan was enabled to do many more things that his polymath interests prompted him to pursue while there than if he had been, for example, a professor in Oxford. His living amounted to more than twice the salary given to some notable professors in Oxford, and so allowed him to adopt a lifestyle that would not have been possible even in the prestigious context of Oxford. As has been indicated already to some degree, it was during this extensive period as vicar of Broadwindsor that Malan thrived not only as a pastoral figure but also in producing numerous publications and other works.

These included translations from ancient Christian sources, various architectural and artistic productions, and extended into biblical studies as well as proverbial literature in as many languages as he could learn from texts that he was able to obtain from a relatively wide range of locations. Though hyperpolyglots are known to live within an autistic spectrum that can make them difficult to live with, Malan tried to manage his tendencies and attitudes associated with perfectionism as well as his highly opinionated assessments of some persons and issues, by occasionally gaining the approval of his bishop to travel in Eastern Europe and Mediterranean lands. This included Syria and Palestine. During those four decades, his published biblical works were wide-ranging, including not only textual studies of ancient translations of the Gospel of John, but also critical studies of translations of the Bible in a number of Asiatic languages, including Chinese, Japanese, Korean, and Mongolian. Malan also produced two large works for children about Gospel parables and miracles.

It is notable that his sketch art was considered of such quality that nearly four dozen of his pieces were included in an edition of the King James Bible produced in 1865. In his magnum opus, the three-volume work entitled Original Notes on the Book of Proverbs (1889-1893), Malan demonstrated various levels of what could be assessed as "general competence" in reading and translating proverbial literature into English from at least fifty-four different languages. In that final and massive work—one that has been largely overlooked and not understood to any degree until very recently—most of the proverbial sayings he had read and translated into English came from texts in "eastern" cultures, including works in East Asian, Southeast Asian, and Central Asian languages. In that same work, he also included a good number of suitable sayings from Mediterranean and European language texts, including among those most often cited language texts proverbial sayings from Aramaic, Egyptian hieroglyphics, Georgian, Greek, Hebrew, Italian, Latin, Spanish and Welsh.

Public recognition of his talents as a linguist and his wide-ranging contributions as a Biblical scholar was confirmed through the University of Edinburgh, who presented him with an honorary doctorate for these achievements in 1880. In order to portray these multifaceted aspects of his life and interests, further summaries of his contributions will be described and evaluated in the following three sections of this article.

== Contributions to Christian and biblical scholarship ==
For more than a century after his death, Solomon Caesar Malan's published works have been generally characterized as having, revealed through translation, many important aspects of non-European Christian and sapiential traditions; yet, while heightening his polyglot talents by this means, at the same time Malan's critics have denied that there was anything notably scholarly, critical, or creative within them. Recent scholarly assessments of his published Christian and biblical studies have challenged these previous judgments.

An initial indication of some of Malan's critical insights applied to biblical texts is discovered within the 1862 account of the "deeper truths" revealed by comparing eleven older translations of the Gospel of John with its koiné Greek standard text. As the subtitle of the work indicates, Malan's research into those eleven ancient versions (notably not including the Vulgate version) was intended to counteract textual changes to the Gospel of John proposed by a group of Anglican clerics using other standards of textual analysis. What Malan was essentially arguing is that variants found in some Greek versions of the Gospel of John should not only be weighed against the standard Greek text (the Textus Receptus) used in the creation of the King James Bible but also those variants should be evaluated in the light of how many other early translations of the Gospel of John support those alternatives. On this basis, Malan argued that "deeper truths" about the text and claims of that New Testament document could then be discerningly and more justifiably confirmed. As a consequence, Malan was providing critical textual insights into ancient Christian traditions of the transmission of the Gospel of John, and applying them as critical standards to challenge the textual alterations adopted by his more radical Anglican clerical colleagues. He did this notably by offering English renderings of eleven other ancient translations, accompanied by footnotes indicating various subtleties in those texts. This is despite having to work with ancient translations in "Syrian, Ethiopic, Armenian, Sahidic, Mephitic, Gothic, Georgian, Sclavonic [sic], Anglo-Saxon, Arabic, and Persian." Malan was countering a textual skepticism that arose from those clerics' assertions of the need for "textual alternatives," and anticipating an approach that has now been adopted regularly in New Testament textual scholarship.

A second area of critically insightful evaluations that Malan published had to do with the use of various theological terms in biblical translations within Chinese, Japanese, Korean, and Mongolian renderings as they were found in versions produced in the mid-19th century. These works were written and published in order to help those producing Bibles in various languages to have critical awareness of what they were promoting.

Two other critical advances in biblical scholarship have been recently highlighted through studies of Malan's three-volume magnum opus, Original Notes on the Book of Proverbs (1889-1893). One of these critical advances was the addition of etymological notes before most sections of the biblical book of Proverbs studied in this work. Within them, Malan used scholarly accounts of the Hebrew standard text to challenge renderings in the Septuagint Greek, Latin Vulgate, and English King James Version of those same texts. He did this by means of his substantial Hebrew scholarly assessments, by reference to the Chaldean Targum, and versions of the biblical proverbial texts in Arabic, Armenian, Coptic and Syriac. The fact that he criticized the King James Version's English renderings in this context is quite unexpected by those who knew Malan to be, as he was a strong advocate for the beauty and authority of the King James English Bible.

The second critical advance within Malan's magnum opus is his recognition of a series of ancient Egyptian proverbial texts with those found in a section he highlighted from Proverbs 22:17 to 24:22. The importance and significance of these Hebrew-Egyptian parallels within these specific portions of the biblical book of Proverbs was only recognized in biblical scholarship in the early 1920s, and has continued to be debated by biblical scholars and Egyptologists into the 21st century. Though Malan's work does not contribute to the debates that later have become attached to these passages, he did recognize the parallels existed, and documented them in his footnotes with a thoroughness that anticipated the debates by at least three decades, if not more.

Finally, two other contributions Malan made to Christian scholarship in 19th-century Great Britain rightly deserve to be identified and elaborated. First, there was his extensive interest in what can be called "Eastern Christianity," an interest that stood in stark contrast to his principled opposition to Roman Catholic liturgical and theological traditions. From his own assessment of these alternative traditions of Christianity, he considered them not to be heretical (which was the general attitude of many in his day), but worthy of recognition and having creatively produced spiritual literature that he felt could be edifying for Anglican priests and their parishes. The number of translations from various traditions vary, but it is notable to point out that he rendered Greek Orthodox, Russian Orthodox, Georgian, Syrian, Armenian, Coptic, and Ethiopic sources into English texts. Malan contributed to what could become part of an ecumenical bridge to these other Christian traditions that did not otherwise exist in 19th century Great Britain. His second contribution was to Christian missiology, as seen particularly in an unassuming volume he published in 1858 under the title of Letters to a Young Missionary. Within that volume, Malan offered advice regarding the maintenance of a "cross-cultural openness", in opposition to an aggressive cultural rejection of traditions in various mission fields. Instead, Malan provided justifications for a missionary attitude that respects ancient and classical traditions within non-Christian cultures.

His final published effort began after he had retired from his vicarate in the small village of Broadwindsor, and took up residence with his wife in Bournemouth starting in 1885. Perhaps it was because he had left his pastoral position that he felt more free to present critical assessments of the renderings of the Book of Proverbs in the King James Bible. Malan worked in Bournemouth on the published version of Original Notes on the Book of Proverbs without access to his personal library until very near his death in 1894.

== The Malan Library in Oxford and its dissolution ==
Only in the most recent scholarship on Malan has a thorough attempt to identify and describe what was called "The Malan Library" been documented. The personal library of Solomon Caesar Malan was unique, not only because of the more than one hundred languages represented within it, but because it consisted of not only published books or codices, but also parchments and hand-written manuscripts in numerous languages. Another way to characterize this library is through a portrayal of the scholarly achievement of Malan himself. This was done in part in the previous section, but here a citation from Monier Monier-Wiliams (1819-1899), the Boden Professor of Sanskrit as well as Keeper and Curator of the Indian Institute in Oxford at the time, had this to say about Malan: Malan was "an Orientalist absolutely unequalled, and never likely to be equalled, in respect of the marvellous diversity of his linguistic attainments and the profundity of his scholarship." Historically, it was the personal libraries of Malan and Monier-Williams that set the foundation for what is now the Oriental Division in the Bodleian Libraries, highlighting their significance as donations to Oxford University. There is a need to be alert to several factors related to the donation of this library collection made by Malan in January 1885. What was donated did not include the vast majority of the Tibetan documents that Malan had kept until 1884. The extensive collections of the Church Fathers that Malan obtained have now been relocated to the library of Keble College. The collection that became the Malan Library as housed in the Indian Institute in 1896, two years after Malan's death, was probably the majority of Malan's personal library, but clearly not all of it. There was an initial promise to maintain the library as a distinct entity in perpetuam, but later, the Malan Library was dispersed into what is now the Oriental Division of the Bodleian Libraries in 1965. There were other interests involved in redistributing the collection and making the Indian Institute available for other purposes. One of the main problems was that there weren't enough funds to hire suitable librarians to manage and organize such a unique library.

It is now impossible to identify the actual contents of the Malan Library as it existed from 1896 to 1965, but there are at least some ways current librarians, scholars, and bibliographers have found to identify portions of that library. One way is to locate tomes, codices, and manuscripts that bear a book plate which indicates that the text originally belonged originally to Malan's personal library. This approach to reconstructing the content of the Malan Library is fallible because not all of the computerized bibliographic notes document that they originally belonged to Malan. Another way would be to read through and identify the titles mentioned in book lists and card catalogue entries made for the Malan Library. They had been relocated by Oxford librarians around 2011 when reconstructing the Bodleian Libraries in order to make them more accessible by computers. These lists and catalogue cards do not provide a comprehensive account of the former Malan Library. There has not been a proven way to identify all the items that used to belong to the Malan Library. These three ways mentioned above have been speculated to be able to identify as much as 60% to 70% of the original collection.

Most of the items Malan donated to the Bodleian Libraries were books or codices that came from a wide variety of publishers. As much as one-fifth of the whole collection were Christian works, including samples of Bibles or Bible sections in many languages, translations of various major Christian classics, and several large sets of the writings of church fathers. Some works were already considered antiquarian texts in Malan's own lifetime, and there are at least 17 items already identified that were published before the year 1700. Though many of the publishers who produced works were from the European continent, there were also items produced from as many as 17 different places in India (including what is now Pakistan and Bangladesh), four in Burma (now Myanmar), two in Ceylon (now Sri Lanka), and a number of others from Algiers, Beirut, China, Japan, Jerusalem and Siam (now Thailand). Malan's donations included rare manuscripts and items in at least eleven languages as well as polyglot writings that display the breadth of Malan's interests. There are also two major manuscripts that Malan created himself. The largest is the manuscript version of the Original Notes on the Book of Proverbs. The second largest is a volume of devotional texts written as 31 daily readings, calligraphed in red and black ink designs. Those texts are illustrated in more than 80 languages. Malan referred to it as the Sacra Privata, because it was a testimony to his Christian devotion and delight in languages that he created for himself when he had reached the age of 40.

== Malan's hyperpolyglossia and polymath interests ==
Much emphasis has been made in his son's biography as well as in later scholarship regarding Solomon Caesar Malan's extraordinary linguistic talents. Recent work has highlighted the high quality of his amateur sketching in pencil, pen, and watercolour. Some attention has been given to his calligraphic skills, as revealed in his Sacra Privata as well as in the manuscript version of the Original Notes on the Book of Proverbs. It has been noted that in Sacra Privata, his Manchurian script involved a good many scripted errors, but improved over time. His calligraphic presentation in Manchurian in the Sacra Privata in 1852 was almost without error. One Swiss Tibetologist noted that Malan wrote in three different styles of Tibetan, a relatively rare achievement. His Chinese calligraphy was elegant and written in Traditional Chinese characters with a controlled brush that rarely contained errors. How well he wrote in languages such as Sanskrit, Hebrew, Arabic, Burmese, Persian, and Mongolian have yet to be studied. The collections of birds' eggs held at the Royal Albert Memorial Museum show that he had an eye for natural details and a nuanced way of categorization. His attainments in bookbinding, music composition, carpentry, and architecture, of which there are important and extant examples, have not been expertly examined as of writing.

An issue of Malan's hyperpolyglossia has taken centre stage in recent scholarship. Malan's studies of linguistic learning, hyperpolyglossia, and aspects of supposed autistic personality traits casts uncertainty about his social skills. A. N. Malan's biography of his father indicates that at times, Solomon Caesar Malan was harshly dismissive of those who dared to criticize him. He was strongly opinionated, dictatorial in his relationships to those under his authority, and a perfectionist in attitude, if not in attainment. These attitudes were also reflected in Malan's principled opposition to the promotion of Westcott and Hort's revised Greek text of the New Testament, started in 1853 and completed in 1881. It was one of the earlier presentations of that revised Greek text that provoked Malan to write a scholarly rebuttal from the Gospel of John in 1862. Another attitude was his rejection of using transliterations of non-European languages because there were phonetic elements within them that had no equivalent in European languages. Instead, he preferred to write them out in their own script, rather than struggle with the arbitrariness of developing linguistic signs for what was unpronounceable in European languages. Later scholars have noted that neither of these two positions has become dominant in subsequent Christian or linguistic scholarly traditions. Despite these problematic attitudes, and poor personality traits, Malan was also a compassionate writer of Christian books for children and had an open-hearted attitude toward non-European expressions of Christianity. He held an appreciation of wisdom that was expressed in Asian cultural contexts that defied the narrowness of negative and dismissive attitudes. One of his teachers who taught the younger Swiss student Syriac, proclaimed, "God must have made his brain of a brick form the Tower of Babel." Another, who had never known him personally, recognized from one of his translations of "Eastern Christianity" that he was a "strange near-genius." He was an unusually gifted man who was driven not only by an insatiable linguistic desire to understand human expressions of wisdom but also by a profoundly Christian vision of reality that curtailed and redirected many of his more unpalatable autistic habits.

Historically, no other modern scholar has approached the linguistic diversity of Mezzofanti;, who was said to have come to know about fifty living languages to a relatively high degree. Solomon Caesar Malan wrote and read more than eighty languages, but one should question the relative level of comprehension he attained in them. For at least a century since his death, those who wrote about Malan believed that he, like Mezzofanti, was more of a linguist than a critic. Solomon Caesar Malan's linguistic explorations clearly outpaced his ability to bring a thoroughly critical assessment to that which he was learning from the study of comparative wisdom sayings. His paremiology, reveals limitations in his understandings of the literary and linguistic hermeneutic contexts of ancient texts. This has now been shown in recent studies of Malan's numerous references to the Mahābhārata, the Confucian Analects and other related classical Chinese texts, and various Chinese folk proverbs. It can be claimed that he did better with texts in languages learned from living persons, rather than those learned by his own self-study. His realization of different world views within the various Tibetan texts he studied appears to be more precise and less misjudged than those in Chinese texts. He did not always comprehend the complexities of the texts he read (especially in the case of the Mahābhārata), and sometimes he tended to internalize his understanding of certain passages or phrases in terms of his Christian theology and its concomitant worldview. This did not happen often, but it is manifest in various places within the published version of his magnum opus that make some of his English renderings of foreign language texts awkward to read. These shortcomings should not eclipse what Malan was able to understand and apply to his evaluations of translations of biblical texts in East Asian languages, as well as expressions of Eastern Christian traditions. Malan's achievements went beyond skills of translation into areas of critical insight.

== Drawings of an excavation in Nineveh by S. C. Malan (1850) ==
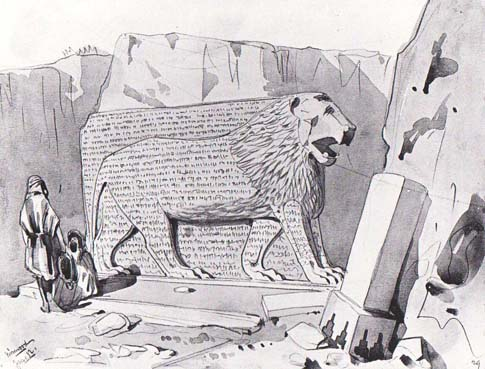
Lion. Nimroud

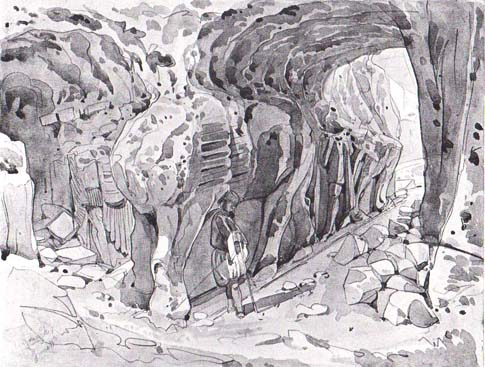
At Kuyunjik

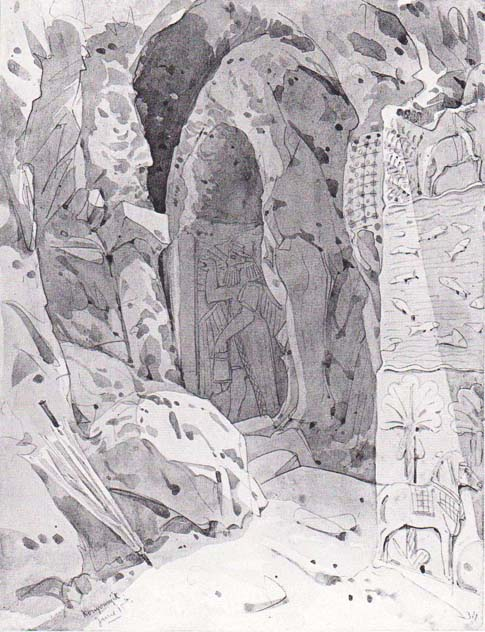
Excavtions at Kuyunjik

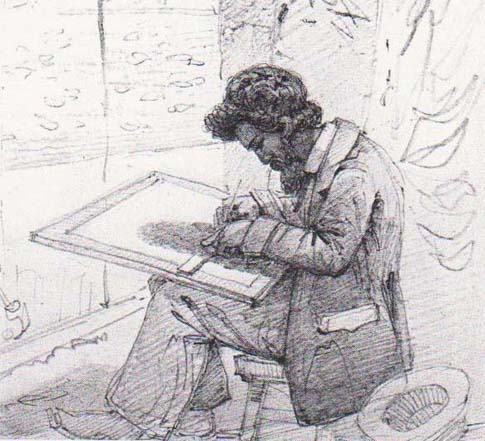
Austen Henry Layard at Kuyunjik

== Published works ==
- The Book of Adam and Eve, also called The Conflict of Adam and Eve with Satan, a Book of the early Eastern Church, translated from the Ethiopic (Gadla Adan wa Hewan) with notes from the Kufale, Talmud, Midrashim, and other Eastern works. London and Edinburgh: Williams and Norgate, 1882.
- The Conflict of the Holy Apostles, an apocryphal book of the early Eastern Church translated from and Ethiopic Ms.
- The Epistle of S. Dionysius the Areopagite to Timothy, translated from an Ethiopic Ms.
- The Gospel According to Saint John. Translated from the Eleven Oldest Versions Except the Latin, and Compared with the English Bible: with notes on every one of the alternations proposed by the five clergymen in their revised version of this gospel. Published in 1857. London: J. Masters, 1862.
- A Letter to the Right Honourable the Earl of Shaftesbury . . . On the Pantheistic and on the Buddhistic Tendency of the Chinese and of the Mongolian Versions of the Bible Published by that Society. London: Bell and Daldy, 1856.
- Letters to a Young Missionary. London: Joseph Masters, 1858.
- The Life and times of S. Gregory the Illuminator, the Founder and Patron Saint of the Armenian Church. London: Rivington, 1868.
- The Miracles of our Lord and Saviour Jesus Christ, Explained to Country Children. London: George Bell and Sons, 1881.
- On the Corean version of the Gospels. London: C. Green, 1890.
- Original Documents of the Coptic Church. London: D. Nutt, 1872-1873.
- Original Notes on the Book of Proverbs, mostly from eastern writings. Three volumes. London and Edinburgh: William and Norgate, 1889-1893.
- The Parables of Our Lord and Saviour Jesus Christ. Two volumes. London: Bell and Daldy, 1872.
- A Plea for the Received Greek Text and for the Authorised Version of the New Testament: In Answer to Some of the Dean of Canterbury's Criticism of Both. London: Hatchards, 1869.
- The Rest of Assumption of S. John the Evangelist, translated from the Armenian.
- Seven Chapters (Matthew I-VI and Luke XI) of the Revised by S. C. Malan. London: Hatchards, 1881.
- A Short History of the Georgian Church. London: Saunders [and] Orley, 1864.
- The Three-fold San-tsze-king; or, The Trilateral Classic of China, as Issued I. by Wang-Po-keou, II. by Protestant Missionaries in that Country; and III. By the Rebel-Chief Tae-ping-wang (Hung Hsiu-ch'uan). London: D. Nutt, 1856.
- Who is God in China, Shin or Shangte? Remarks on the Etymology of Elohim and of Theos, and on the Rendering of these Terms into Chinese. London: Samuel Bagster, 1855.

== Unpublished works ==
- Sacra Privata. Donated to the Bodleian Library on 19 September 1859. Call number: MS.or.Polyg.f.1.
- Original Notes on the Book of Proverbs. Donated to the Bodleian Library in October 1894. Call number: MS.Ind.Insti.Misc.10.
- Syria, Assyria and Armenia. Drawings from Nature, Taken from May 1st to July 29th, 1850. Vol. IF (274 Sketches). Donated to the British Library. Call number: Add.MS.45360.

== See also ==
- List of polyglots
- Edward Churton and William Basil Jones, eds. The New Testament of Our Lord and Saviour Jesus Christ illustrated by a Plain Explanatory Comment and by Authentic Views of Places mentioned in the Sacred Text from Sketches and Photographs taken on the Spot. London: John Murray, 1865. Two Volumes.
