= List of Légion d'honneur recipients by name (M) =

The French government gives out the Legion of Honour awards, to both French and foreign nationals, based on a recipient's exemplary services rendered to France, or to the causes supported by France. This award is divided into five distinct categories (in ascending order), i.e. three ranks: Knight, Officer, Commander, and two titles: Grand Officer and Grand Cross. Knight is the most common and is awarded for either at least 20 years of public service or acts of military or civil bravery. The rest of the categories have a quota for the number of years of service in the category below before they can be awarded. The Officer rank requires a minimum of eight years as a Knight, and the Commander, the highest civilian category for a non-French citizen, requires a minimum of five years as an Officer. The Grand Officer and the Grand Cross are awarded only to French citizens, and each requires three years' service in their respective immediately lower rank. The awards are traditionally published and promoted on 14 July.

The following is a non-exhaustive list of recipients of the Legion of Honour awards, since the first ceremony in May 1803. 2,550 individuals can be awarded the insignia every year. The total number of awards is close to 1 million (estimated at 900,000 in 2021, including over 3,000 Grand Cross recipients), with some 92,000 recipients alive today. Only until 2008 was gender parity achieved amongst the yearly list of recipients, with the total number of women recipients since the award's establishment being only 59 at the end of the second French empire and only 26,000 in 2021.

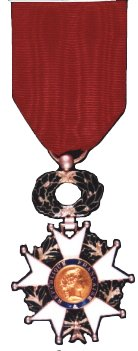

Recipient	Dates (birth – death)	General work & reason for the recognition	Award category (date)
Douglas MacArthur			
Donald Matheson	1926-2021	D-Day Landing on the 6th June 1944 - Able seaman aboard H.M.S Black Prince. Flag Semaphore - Flag communications between ships. Telegraphist.	Knight (2021)
Ian MacGregor	1912 – 1998	Scottish-American metallurgist and industrialist	
Frederick William MacMonnies			
Franciszek Macharski			
Nevil Macready			
Mauricio Macri		President of Argentina	
Stanisław Maczek		Polish general	
Auguste Antoine Maestracci		Recognised for his military and civil service.	TBA (1913)
Norman Mailer			
Jean-Christophe Maillot			
Jacques Maisonrouge			
Claude François de Malet			
Laure Manaudou			
Steve Mandanda		World Cup winning footballer	
Benoît Mandelbrot			
Édouard Manet	1832 – 1883	French painter	TBA (1881)
Lata Mangeshkar		India	
Charles Mangin			
Carl Gustaf Emil Mannerheim	1867 – 1951		
Alexander Mantashev	1842 – 1911	Oil magnate, financier and philanthropist. Made a donation to build Armenian Cathedral of St. John the Baptist in Paris	
Frederick Mappin			
Sir Frederick Mappin, 1st Baronet			
Jean-Baptiste Antoine Marcellin Marbot		French general	
Antoine Adolphe Marcelin Marbot		French general	
Marcel Marceau			
Peyton C. March			
André Marchal			
Stanley Marcus			
Maria of Yugoslavia		Consort of King Alexander I of Yugoslavia	
Anna Marly			
Lara Marlowe		American journalist	
Auguste Marmont			
Jacques Maroger			
Paule Marrot	1902 – 1987	Parisian textile designer	
Wynton Marsalis			
Albert Marshall			
David Marshall	1908–1995	Chief Minister of Singapore (1955–1956), Singaporean ambassador to France (1978–1993)	Knight (1978)
George Marshall			
Richard Marshall			
Frédéric Martens	1806 – 1885	French photographer	Knight (10/29/1855)
Gregory S. Martin			
Henri Martre			
Charles Marx			
Tomáš Garrigue Masaryk			
Mashhour Ahmed Mashhour		President of Suez Canal Authority in Egypt 1965 – 1983	
Henri Gratte Maskens		Captain in the Service of Napoleon 1, 1787 – 1871	
André Masséna			
William Massey		Prime Minister of New Zealand 1912 – 1925	
Isabelle Massieu	1844 – 1932	French traveler, photographer and writer	
Jan Matejko			
Mateja Matevski			
Mireille Mathieu			
Olivier Elzéar Mathieu			
Ginette Mathiot			
Mimie Mathy		French actress and comedian	Knight (4 May 2015)
Blaise Matuidi		World Cup winning footballer	
Amélie Mauresmo		French tennis champion	
François Mauriac			
Daniel Maximin			
Peter Mayle			
Paddy Mayne			
Robert Blair Mayne			
Kylian Mbappé		World Cup winning footballer	
Paul McCartney			
John P. McConnell|			
Cyrus McCormick			
James "Earthquake McGoon" McGovern Jr.		American World War II and First Indochina War pilot	
Leonard William McKiel			
Beverly McLachlin			
Lesley J. McNair			
Joseph T. McNarney			
Merrill A. McPeak			
Joe Medicine Crow		Last war chief of the Crow tribe	
Zubin Mehta			
Étienne Méhul			
Georges Méliès			
Antoine Brutus Menier			
Benjamin Mendy		World Cup winning footballer	
Henri Menier			
Emile-Justin Menier			
Honoré Mercier			
Lennart Meri		President of Estonia	Grand Cross (July 28, 2001)
Angela Merkel			
Philippe-Antoine Merlin de Douai			
Yves Mersch			
Luc-Olivier Merson			
Olivier Messiaen		Composer, organist, and pianist.	
Paul Métivier			
Corinne Mentzelopoulos			
André Meyer			
Gerald C. Meyers			
Joseph François Michaud			
Aníbal Milhais		Portuguese World War I hero	
Darius Milhaud			
Édouard Jean Baptiste Milhaud		Removed from the Légion after the second restoration of Louis XVIII	
Madeleine Milhaud			
Niko Miljanić			
George Millar			
Syd Millar			
Franklin Miller			
Seymour Miller WW2 Tank commander D-Day Invasion			
Charles Joseph Minard			
Alfred Peter Mischo			
Živojin Mišić			
Francis Mitchell (Royal Navy officer)			
Nancy Mitford			
Mizan Zainal Abidin		Sultan of Terengganu and current Yang Di-Pertuan Agong of Malaysia	
Narendra Modi		Prime Minister of India	Grand Cross (14 July 2023)
Robert Mondavi			
Mongkut		King of Thailand	
Henri Monod	1843 - 1911	Head of the Directorate of Public Welfare, Paris.	Knight (12 July 1880)
Jacques Monod		Molecular biologist. First cousin twice removed of Henri Monod, who was also a recipient.	
Luc Montagnier			
Prosper Montagné			
Jean-Pierre de Montalivet			
Philippe de Montebello			
Agénor Azéma de Montgravier			
Raymond Monvoisin			
Charles Moore			
James Moore (cyclist)			
Charles Antoine Morand			
Justin Bonaventure Morard de Galles			
Charles Paul Narcisse Moreau			
Émilienne Moreau-Evrard			
Daniel Morelon			
Roland Moreno			
Michèle Morgan			
Eugène Moret, Officier			
Thomas Alfred Morgan			
Akio Morita			
Vincent de Moro-Giafferi			
Ennio Morricone			
Leslie Morshead			
James Mortimer			
Serge Moscovici	1925 – 2014	Social psychologist	
Otakar Motejl	1932 – 2010		2000
Lamia Moubayed Bissat			TBA (13 July 2015)
Paul Mounet			
Ethel Moustacchi	1933 - 2016	Rersearcher in molecular biology and radiobiology, and research director at the French National Centre for Scientific Research	Knight (1999), Officer (2013)
Mamadou Moustapha Sall		Secretary General of Cams	
Gerard Muirhead-Gould			
Brian Mulroney		Axel Munthe, Physician and writer.	
Alexander Murdoch		World War II veteran	2019
Audie Murphy	1925 – 1971	U.S. Army soldier, actor, songwriter	
John Murray (soldier)			
Leonard W. Murray			
Alfred de Musset	1810 – 1857	French dramatist, poet, novelist	
Riccardo Muti			

== See also ==
- Legion of Honour
- List of Legion of Honour recipients by name
- List of foreign recipients of the Legion of Honour by country
- List of British recipients of the Legion of Honour for the Crimean War
- Legion of Honour Museum
- Ribbons of the French military and civil awards
- War Cross (France)
