= François Gaussen =

Swiss divine (1790–1863)

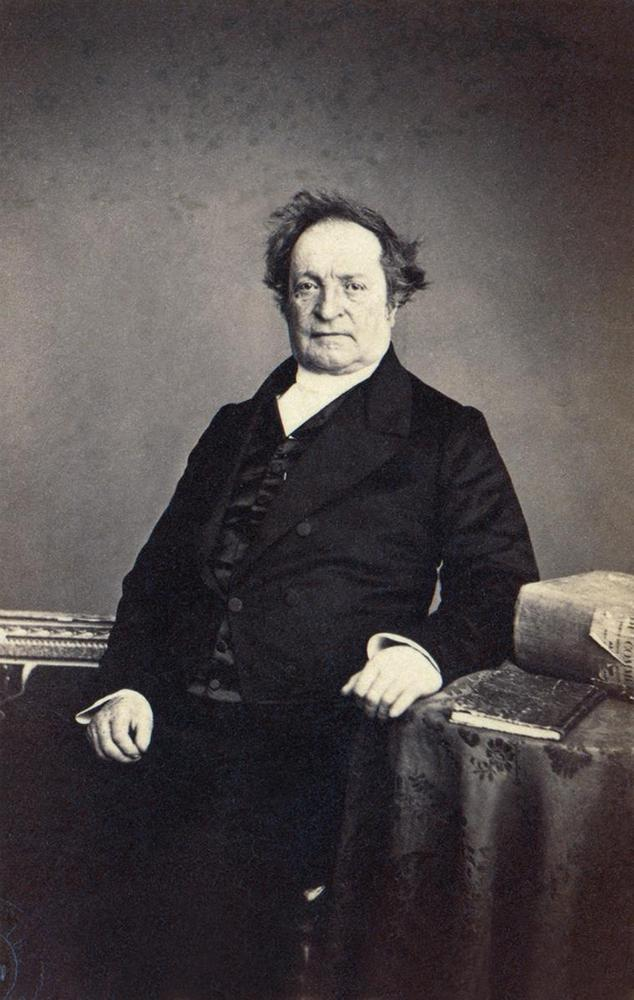
Louis Gaussen, c.1850.

François Samuel Robert Louis Gaussen (25 August 1790 – 18 June 1863) was a Swiss Protestant divine.

== Life ==
Gaussen was born at Geneva. His father, Georg Markus Gaussen, a member of the Council of Two Hundred, was descended from an been scattered at the time of the religious persecutions in France. At the close of his university career at Geneva, Louis was in 1816 appointed pastor of the Swiss Reformed Church at Satigny near Geneva, where he formed a close relationship with J. E. Cellérier, who had preceded him in the pastorate, and also with the members of the dissenting congregation at Bourg-de-Four, which, together with the Église du témoignage, had been formed under the influence of the preaching of James and Robert Haldane in 1817. The Swiss revival was distasteful to the pastors of Geneva (Venérable Compagnie des Pasteurs), and on 7 May 1817 they passed an ordinance hostile to it.

As a protest against this ordinance, in 1819 Gaussen published in conjunction with Cellerier a French translation of the Second Helvetic Confession, with a preface expounding the views he had reached upon the nature, use, and necessity of confessions of faith; and in 1830, for having discarded the official catechism of his church as being insufficiently explicit on the divinity of Christ, original sin and the doctrines of grace, he was censured and suspended by his ecclesiastical superiors. In the following year he took part in the formation of a Société Evangélique (Evangelische Gesellschaft). When this society contemplated, among other objects, the establishment of a new theological college, he was finally deprived of his charge.

Gaussen's interest in Adventism was influenced by Henry Drummond, who was visiting Geneva in 1817, and who gathered around him some of the most prominent Adventists of the day.

Gaussen's reading of Rollin's "Ancient History" and a belief that the prophecies in the second Book of Daniel had been fulfilled were also influential in leading him to an interest in the Second Advent, and following further study of the Bible, he came to the conclusion that the Second Coming of Christ was near. His wish was to inform the public of his findings, hoping to encourage study of the prophetic books of the Bible in the churches of French speaking congregations. Believing that the people would find the prophecies of Daniel too difficult to understand, he decided to begin by teaching the children, explaining that "To publish instruction given to the children is to say to adults, who too often neglect such books under the false pretence that they are obscure, ‘How can they be obscure, since your children understand them?’ I had a great desire, to render a knowledge of the prophecies popular in our flocks, if possible. There is no study, indeed, which it seems to me answers the needs of the time better. It is by this that we are to prepare for the tribulation near at hand, and watch and wait for Jesus Christ." His plan worked, with the result that people began flocking to his meetings, including strangers from other countries who were visiting Geneva.

In 1839, inspired by his success with the children, Gaussen published a first volume entitled The Prophet Daniel Explained in a series of readings for young persons, with the second following in 1848.

After some time devoted to travel in Italy and England, he returned to Geneva and ministered to an independent congregation until 1834, when he joined Merle d'Aubigné as professor of systematic theology in the college which he had helped to found. This post he continued to occupy until 1857, when he retired from the active duties of the chair. He died at Les Grottes, Geneva, on 18 June 1863.

His best-known work, entitled La Théopneustie, ou pleine inspiration des saintes écritures, an elaborate defence of the doctrine of plenary inspiration, was originally published in Paris in 1840, and rapidly gained a wide popularity in France, as also, through translations, in England and America. It was followed in 1860 by a supplementary treatise on the canon (Le Canon des saintes écritures au double point de vue de la science et de la foi), which, though also popular, has hardly been so widely read.

== Publications ==
- La Théopneustie, ou pleine inspiration des saintes écritures, Paris, 1840

Gaussen, Louis (28 February 2010) [1840]. Théopneustie, Ou, Inspiration Plénière Des Saintes Écritures [Theopneusty; Or, the Plenary Inspiration of the Holy Scriptures] (in French) (French ed.). Nabu Press. p. 558. ISBN 978-1-146-03305-3.
Gaussen, Louis (28 December 2009) [1842]. Theopneusty; Or, the Plenary Inspiration of the Holy Scriptures (English ed.). General Books LLC. p. 202. ISBN 978-1-151-29457-9. [First trans. by David Duncas Scott, and later revised by B. W. Carr].

- Le Canon des saintes écritures au double point de vue de la science et de la foi, 1860

Gaussen, Louis (12 January 2010) [1860]. Le Canon Des Saintes Écritures Au Double Point De Vue De La Science Et De La Foi, Volume 1 [The canon of the Holy Scriptures from the double point of view of science and of faith] (in French) (French ed.). Nabu Press. p. 594. ISBN 978-1-142-35439-8.
Gaussen, Louis (11 January 2010) [1860]. Le Canon Des Saintes Écritures Au Double Point De Vue De La Science Et De La Foi, Volume 2 [The canon of the Holy Scriptures from the double point of view of science and of faith] (in French) (French ed.). Nabu Press. p. 418. ISBN 978-1-142-48896-3.
Gaussen, Louis (13 May 2010) [1860]. The canon of the Holy Scriptures from the double point of view of science and of faith. Nabu Press. p. 710. ISBN 978-1-149-31012-0.

- Geneva and Rome. Rome Papal as Portrayed By Prophecy and History [tr. from the French] (1844)
- 'It is written': or, Every word and expression contained in the Scriptures proved to be from God [tr. from the French] (1856)
- Lessons for the Young on the Six Days of Creation [tr. from the French] (1860)
- Gideon and the Angel of the Lord, Or, The Deity of Christ: The Doctrine of the Old Testament [tr. from the French]
- From Egypt to Sinai: The Exodus of the Children of Israel [tr. from the French] (The Religious Tract Society, 1869)
- The Prophet Daniel Explained [tr. from the French by Margaret Blackstone] (1873)
- The Prophet Jonah: Lessons on his life [tr. from the French] (The Religious Tract Society, 1884)
- The Story of Daniel: For the Use of Young People [tr. from the French] (1873)

== See also ==
- Edward Norris Kirk • Translator of Gaussen's "Inspiration of the Scriptures" (New York, 1842)
