= Baliani =

Baliani is an Italian surname. Notable people with the surname include:

- Fortunato Baliani (born 1974), Italian cyclist
- Giovanni Battista Baliani, also known as Jean-Baptiste Baliani (1582–1666), Italian mathematician, physicist, astronomer and politician
- Marco Baliani (born 1950), Italian actor, playwright and theatre director
