= Frédéric Monod =

French Protestant pastor

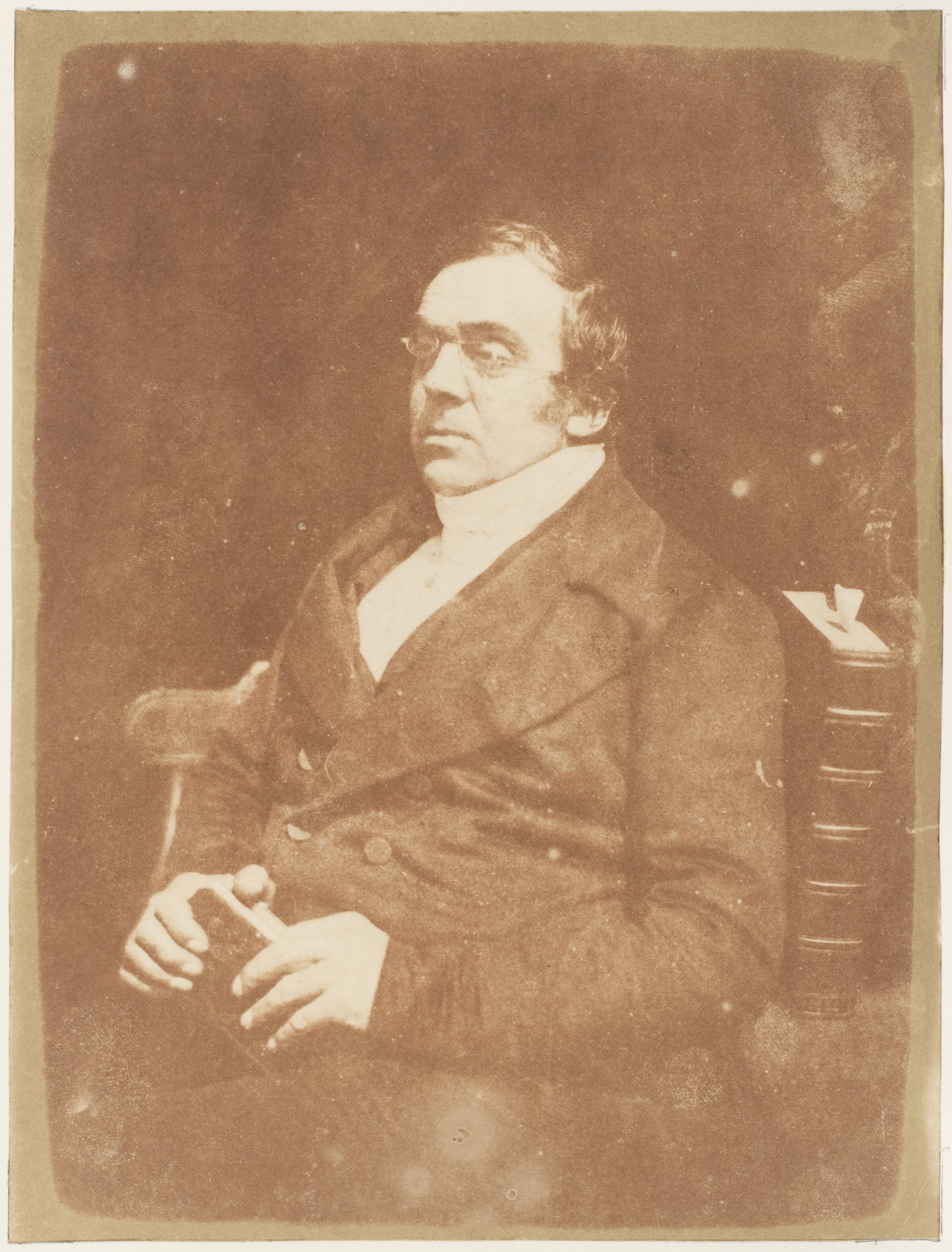
Frederic Monod by Hill & Adamson

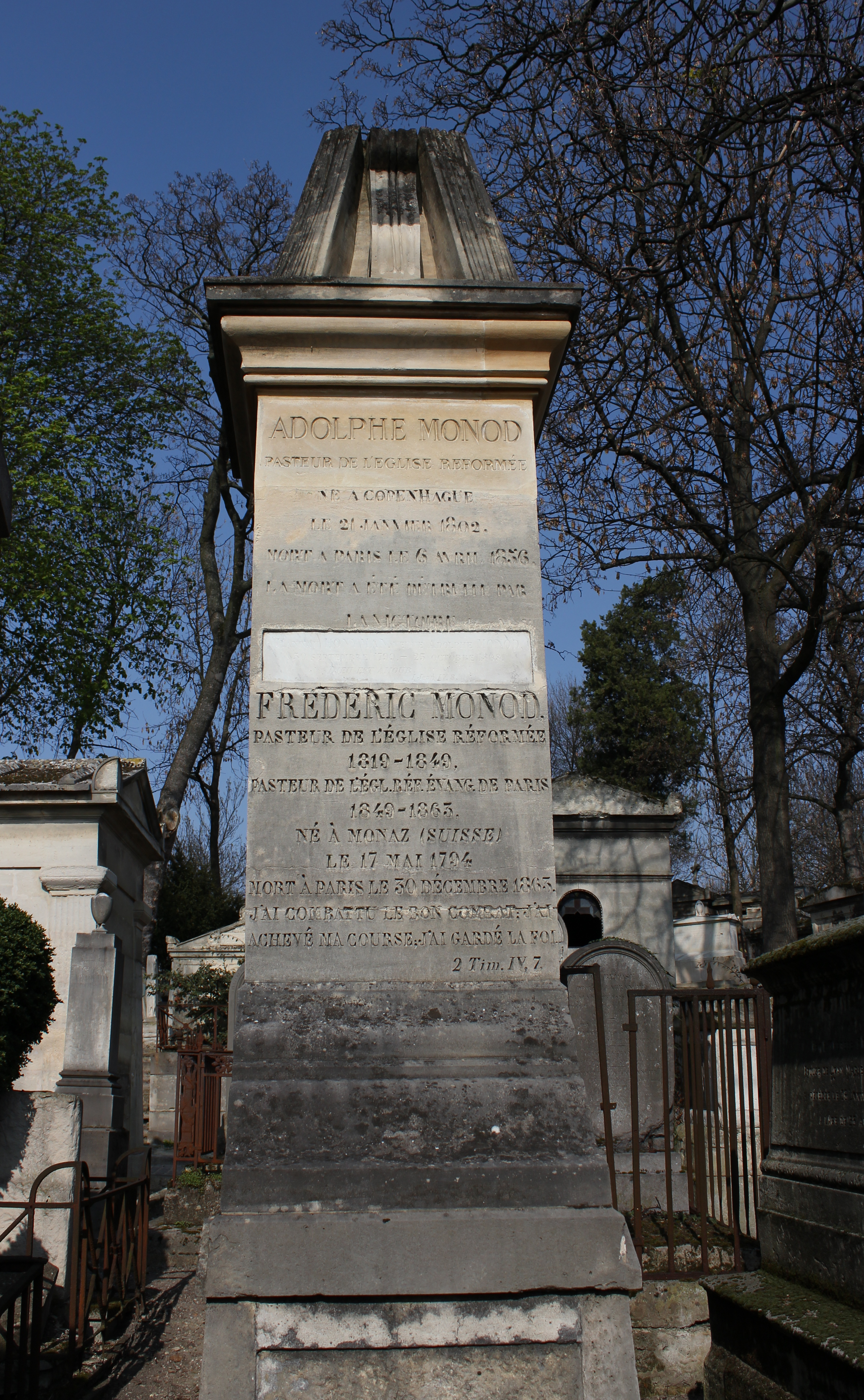
The tomb of Frédéric Monod in Père-Lachaise Cemetery.

Frédéric Monod (17 May 1794, in Monnaz - 30 December 1863, in Paris) was a French Protestant pastor. He was the older brother of minister Adolphe Monod. He was born citizen of the Republic of Geneva, and obtained the French nationality by naturalization in 1820.

He studied theology in Geneva, receiving his consecration in 1818. As a student, he was greatly influenced by the Scottish minister Robert Haldane. From 1820 to 1849 he was a Reformed Church pastor in Paris. In 1849, along with Agénor de Gasparin, he founded the Union of the Evangelical Free Churches of France.

From 1824 up until his death in 1863, he was principal editor of the Archives du Christianisme.

His son, Théodore, (1836–1921) followed in his footsteps. Naturalist and explorer Théodore André Monod is his great-grandson.
