= BiblioBazaar =

American publishing house

- Parent company: BiblioLabs LLC
- Founder: Mitchell Davis; Andrew Roskill
- Country of origin: United States
- Headquarters location: Charleston, South Carolina
- Publication types: Books
- Official website: www.bibliolabs.com

BiblioBazaar is, with Nabu Press, an imprint of the historical reprints publisher BiblioLife, which is based in Charleston, South Carolina and owned by BiblioLabs LLC.

BiblioBazaar / Nerbles, LLC produced, in printable electronic form, 272,930 titles in 2009, although these were used by means of an automated computerized process, using scanned text and generic stock photography for the covers. The company's leaders see it less as a publisher and more as a software company.
