= Viitina =

Village in Estonia

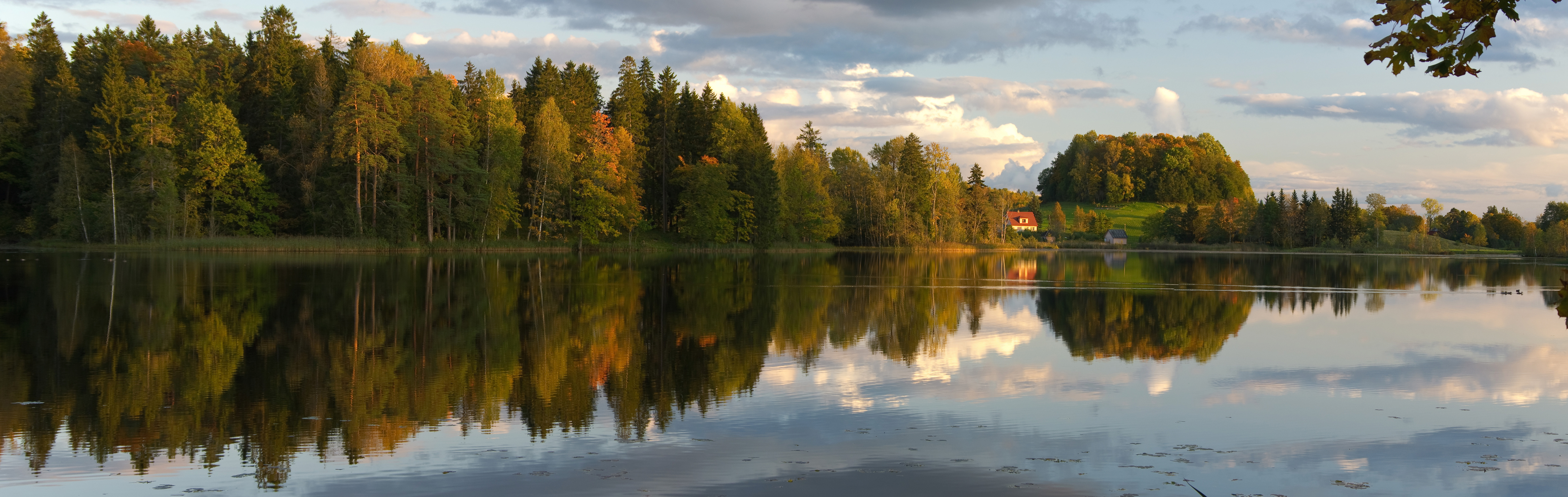
- Lake Viitina

- Location within Estonia
- Coordinates: 57°41′15″N 26°55′56″E
- Country: Estonia
- County: Võru County
- Time zone: UTC+2 (EET)

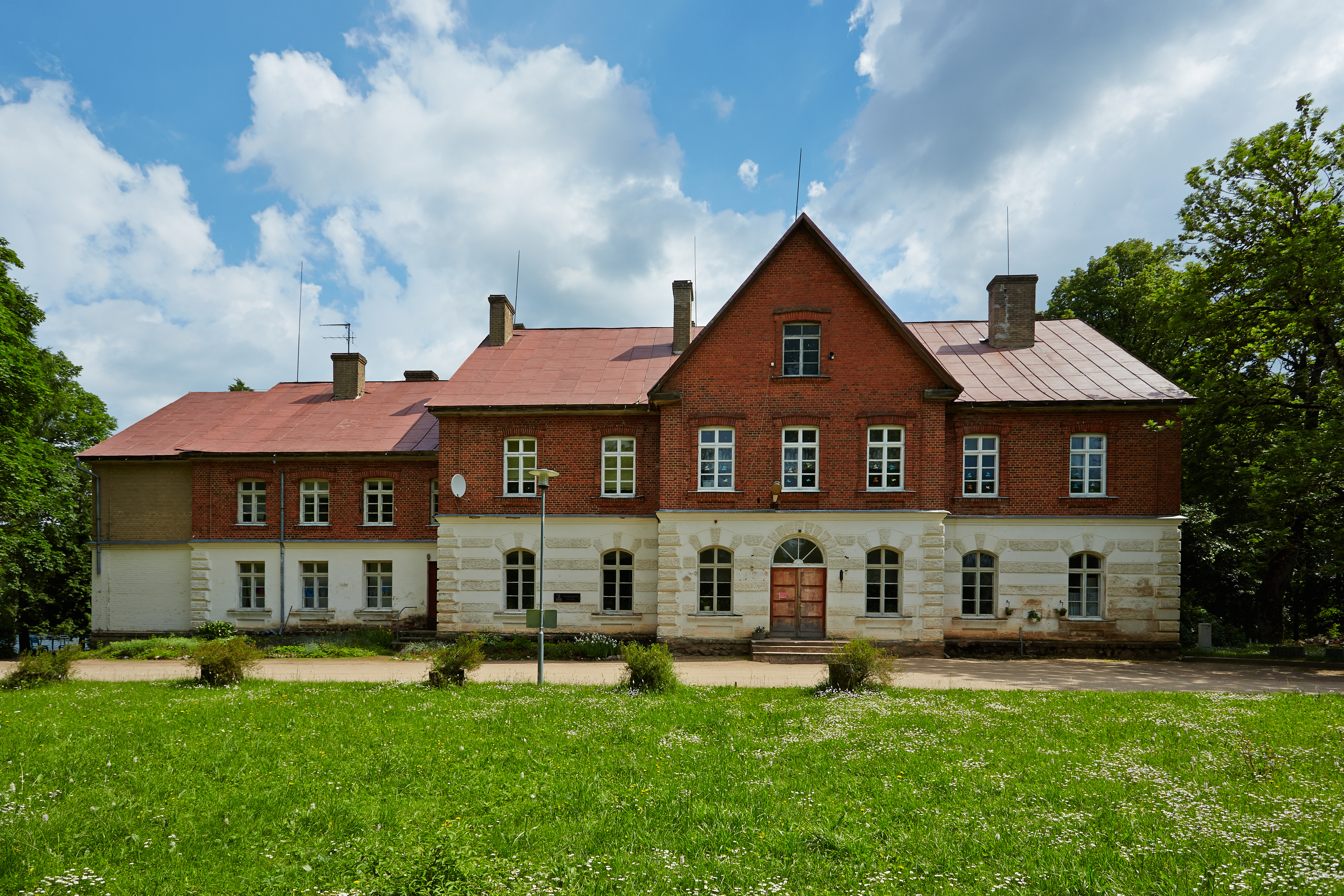
Viitina manor main building

Viitina is a settlement in Rõuge Parish, Võru County in southeastern Estonia.

== Viitina Manor ==
Viitina estate (German: Kosse) has a history that can be traced to at least 1542, when it was given by the Bishop of Tartu to one Dr. Jürgen Holdschner. His son sold the manor to Otto von Vietinghoff, and the estate stayed in the Vietinghoff family until 1782; the manor probably derives its Estonian name from the family.

In 1782 it passed as a dowry to the von Krüdener family, and for some time Barbara von Krüdener was the lady of the manor. In 1842, it was sold to Carl von Jürgensonn, and in 1856 to Count Gustav Igelstrom. Already in 1857, it was sold again, to Arthur von Riechter, and in 1860 to Gustav Samson von Himmelstierna. The last aristocratic owner was Arthur von Wulf, who acquired the estate in 1902. Following the Estonian Declaration of Independence, the estate was taken over by the Estonian state. Today, the main building of the manor houses a school.

The main building dates from 1896 and is built in a historicist style.
