= Adolphe Monod =

French Protestant churchman

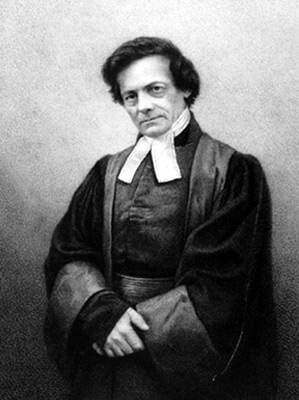
Adolphe Monod

Adolphe-Louis-Frédéric-Théodore Monod (21 January 1802 – 6 April 1856) was a French Protestant pastor and theologian. His elder brother was Frédéric Monod.

== Biography ==
Monod was born in Copenhagen, where his father, Jean Monod (1765–1836; himself the eldest son of pastor Gaspard Joël Monod /1717-1782/ and his wife Suzanne Madeleine Puerari /1739-1799/), was a pastor of the French Reformed church and where Jean Monod met his wife and consequently Adolphe's mother, Louise-Philippine de Coninck (1775-1851), daughter of shipowner Frédéric de Coninck. Educated at Paris and Geneva, Monod began his life-work in 1825 as founder and pastor of a Protestant church in Naples, moving to Lyon in 1827.

In Lyon, Monod' preaching, and especially a sermon on the duties of communicants (Qui doit communier?), led to his deposition by the Catholic Minister of education and religion. Instead of leaving Lyon he began to preach in a hall and then in a chapel. In 1836 Monod took a professorship in the theological college of Montauban, moving in 1847 to Paris as preacher at the Oratoire. He died in Paris on 6 April 1856.

== Legacy ==
Monod was considered by some the foremost Protestant preacher of 19th-century France (e.g. Guillaume Guizot (1833-1892), son of the French statesman and Protestant historian François Guizot (1787-1874) referred to him in an article published in the “Journal des débats politiques et littéraires” (Journal of political and literary debates) on April 11, 1856, i.e. a few days after Adolphe Monod's funeral, as "one of the foremost Christian speakers of his time." He published three volumes of sermons in 1830, another, La Crédulité de l'incrédule in 1844, and two more in 1855. Two further volumes appeared after his death. One of his most influential books was the posthumous, Les Adieux d'Adolphe Monod à ses Amis et à l'Église (1857).

== Marriage and issue ==
Monod married Hannah Honyman (1799-1868) in Lyon on 2 September 1829. They had seven children, including pastor André John William Honyman Monod (1834–1916), philanthropist and feminist Alexandrine Elisabeth Sarah Monod (1836–1912), Émilie Monod and Camille Monod (1843–1910).

== Sources ==
- Chisholm, Hugh, ed. (1911). "Monod, Adolphe" . Encyclopædia Britannica (11th ed.). Cambridge University Press.
- Monod, S., Life and Letters of Adolphe Monod, pastor of the Reformed Church of France, by one of his daughters, London : Nisbet & Co., 1885 — authorised translation, abridged from the original.
- Monod, Adolphe, Adolphe Monod's Farewell to his Friends and to his Church, a new translation by the Rev. Owen Thomas. London, Banner of Truth Trust, 1962.
- Osen, James L., Prophet and peacemaker : the life of Adolphe Monod, Lanham, MD : University Press of America, c1984, ISBN 0-8191-3826-6.
