= Fellow of the Academy of Social Sciences =

Elected fellowship

The Fellowship of the Academy of Social Sciences (FAcSS) is an award granted by the Academy of Social Sciences to leading academics, policy-makers, and practitioners of the social sciences.

Fellows were previously known as Academicians and used the post-nominal letter "AcSS". This was changed in July 2014 to bring the academy in line with other British learned societies.

== Fellows of the Academy of Social Sciences ==
=== 1999 ===
The first fellows (then known as academicians) were elected in 1999. The inaugural fellows were:

- John Alderson, former Chief Constable of Devon and Cornwall Police
- Ron Amann, director-general of the Centre for Management and Policy Studies, Cabinet Office
- Margaret Archer, University of Warwick
- Alan Baddeley, University of Bristol
- Sally Baldwin, director, Social Policy Research Unit, University of York
- Colin Bell, vice-chancellor, University of Bradford
- Ken Binmore, University College London
- Patricia Broadfoot, University of Bristol
- Margaret Brown, King's College, London
- Archie Brown, St Anthony's College, Oxford
- Christopher Brumfit, University of Southampton
- Beatrix Campbell, University of Newcastle
- John Carpenter, University of Durham
- Tony Chapman, principal and chief executive officer, University of Wales Institute
- Richard Chapman, University of Durham Business School
- Mary Chapman, director-general, The Institute of Management
- Christine Chinkin, London School of Economics
- Nicholas Crafts, London School of Economics
- Ivor Crewe, vice-chancellor, University of Essex
- Gavyn Davies, Goldman Sachs International
- Lord Desai, London School of Economics
- Ian Diamond, University of Southampton
- Andrew Dilnot, director, Institute for Fiscal Studies
- Hastings Donnan, Queen's University, Belfast
- Patrick Dunleavy, London School of Economics
- Stuart Etherington, director, National Council for Voluntary Organisations
- Janet Finch, vice-chancellor, Keele University
- Ronnie Frankenberg, Keele University
- Denis Galligan, Wolfson College, University of Oxford
- Fred Halliday, London School of Economics
- David Hargreaves, University of Cambridge
- Patsy Healey, University of Newcastle
- Peter Hennessy, Queen Mary and Westfield College
- Tim Holt, director, Office of National Statistics
- Pat Hudson, Cardiff University
- Will Hutton, editor-in-chief, The Observer
- Sue Iversen, University of Oxford
- Michael Jacobs, Nicholson Graham and Jones
- Ronald Johnston, University of Bristol
- Bill Jordan, University of Exeter
- Roger Jowell, director, National Centre for Social Research
- Anthony King, University of Essex
- Julian Le Grand, London School of Economics
- Jane Lewis, University of Nottingham
- Janet Lewis, research director, Joseph Rowntree Foundation
- Ruth Lister, Loughborough University
- Moss Madden, University of Liverpool
- Jean Martin, social survey division, Office for National Statistics
- Doreen Massey, Open University
- Elizabeth Meehan, Queen's University, Belfast
- Richard Mottram, permanent secretary, Department of the Environment, Transport and the Regions
- Howard Newby, vice-chancellor, University of Southampton
- Bhikhu Parekh, University of Hull
- Andrew Pettigrew, Warwick Business School
- Geoffrey Shindler, partner, Halliwell Landau
- Susan Smith, University of Edinburgh
- Bruce Smith, chairman, Economic and Social Research Council
- Elliot Stern, the Tavistock Institute
- Anthea Tinker, King's College, London
- Peter Townsend, University of Bristol
- Polly Toynbee, journalist
- John Urry, Lancaster University
- Alan Walker, University of Sheffield
- Stephen White, University of Glasgow
- Christine Whitehead, London School of Economics
- Lord Young of Dartington

=== 2000 ===
- Andrew Gamble

=== 2002 ===
There were 91 people elected to the fellowship in 2002:

- Dominic Abrams
- Jane Aldgate
- Floya Anthias
- Jane Askham
- John Bachtler
- Robert Benewick
- John Benyon
- Robert Blackburn
- Mary Boyle
- Avtar Brah
- Glynis Breakwell
- Stephen Broadberry
- Alice Brown
- David Budge
- Joan Busfield
- Michael Byram
- David Byrne
- Jane Campbell, Baroness Campbell of Surbiton
- David Canter
- Ronald Carter
- Simon Clarke
- John Clarke
- Matthew Colton
- Gary Craig
- Gillian Dalley
- Richard Daugherty
- Graham Davey
- Robert Dingwall
- David Dyker
- John Eldridge
- Nigel Fielding
- Ian Forbes
- Janet Ford
- Norah Frederickson
- Maurice Anthony Gale
- Andrew Gamble
- Andrew Gillespie
- Peter Golding
- Ian Gordon
- Ian Gough
- Sarah E. Hampson
- Irene Hardill
- Stephen Harrison
- Mike Hepworth
- Roger Hood
- Dorota Iwaniec
- Stevi Jackson
- Robert Jessop
- Ray Jones
- Martin Knapp
- Stephen Lea
- Roger Lee
- Karen Legge
- Richard Little
- David N. Livingstone
- Robert Logie
- Paul Longley
- Thomas MacKay
- John Mawson
- Susan McRae
- Roger Middleton
- Mary S. Morgan
- Robert Morris
- Susan Owens
- Edward Page
- David Phillips
- David Pitfield
- Jennifer Platt
- Andrew Pollard
- Ken Prandy
- Michael Preston-Shoot
- Richard Pring
- Roderick Rhodes
- Jean Rudduck
- Mike Rustin
- Richard Sakwa
- Kevin Schürer
- John Scott
- Jim Stevenson
- June Thoburn
- Brian Tomlinson
- Peter Tyler
- Janet Walker
- Oliver Westall
- Margaret Wetherell
- Sarah Whatmore
- Geoff Whitty
- Allan Williams
- Fiona Williams
- Charles W. J. Withers
- Robert E. Wright

=== 2003 ===
There were 60 people elected to the fellowship in 2003:

- Peter Alcock
- Kay Anderson
- Madeleine Arnot
- Paul Atkinson
- Christine Bellamy
- Michael Beloff
- Tim Blackman
- David Blane
- Ian Butler
- Bruce Campbell
- Cara Carmichael Aitchison
- Guy Cook
- Philip Cooke
- John Corner
- Ann Davis
- Simin Davoudi
- Bob Deacon
- John Richard Eiser
- Ivan Eisler
- John Furlong
- John Gardner
- Angela Glasner
- Caroline Glendinning
- Susan Hallam
- Geoffrey Harcourt
- Sheila Henderson
- Amer Hirmis
- John Holmwood
- Gillian Hundt
- Ian Jamieson
- Lynn Jamieson
- Elidir King
- Ullrich Kockel
- Hilary Land
- Stephen Linstead
- Angela Little
- Ingrid Lunt
- Neill Marshall
- Robin Means
- Kevin Morgan
- Kevin W Morgan
- Mark Overton
- Ray Pahl
- David Parker
- Michael Parkinson
- Diane Perrons
- Ann Phoenix
- Peter Ramsden
- Nirmala Rao
- Peter Roberts
- Adrian Sinfield
- Maggie Snowling
- John Solomos
- Peter Stratton
- Harry Torrance
- Jane Wardle
- Andrew Whiten
- Robert Woods
- Ted Wragg
- Neil Wrigley

=== 2004 ===
There were 51 people elected to the fellowship in 2004:

- Peter Aggleton
- Alan Aldridge
- R. Allen
- Clive Archer
- John Bond
- Saxon Brettell
- Charlotte Burck
- John Burnham
- Chris Caswill
- Andrew Coleman
- Elisabeth Croll
- Anthony Crook
- Gordon Dabinett
- Alan Deacon
- John Dixon
- J. Dockrell
- Martin Everett
- Kenneth Gilhooly
- Usha Goswami
- Terence Gourvish
- Rebecca Harding
- Sally Hardy
- Michael Hoey
- Katrina Honeyman
- Ursula Huws
- Raymond Illsley
- Charlie Jeffery
- Richard Jenkins
- Grant Jordan
- Geoff Lindsay
- Jim Mansell
- Antony Manstead
- Linda McKie
- Tariq Modood
- Anton Muscatelli
- Joseph Nellis
- Jenny Ozga
- Gareth Rees
- David William Rhind
- Richard Rodger
- Graham Room
- David Rose
- Ajit Singh
- Bebe Speed
- Eddy Street
- Kathy Sylva
- Jonathan Tonge
- Christine Victor
- David Williams
- Colin Wren
- Andy Young

=== March 2006 ===
There were 63 people elected to the fellowship in March 2006:

- David Airey
- Martyn Barrett
- Saul Becker
- Mark Bennett
- Peter Beresford
- Neil Blake
- Joanna Bornat
- Ben Bowling
- Julia Brannen
- Christopher Bryant
- Peter Burns
- Gibson Burrell
- John Bynner
- Bill Bytheway
- David Charles
- Christopher Colclough
- Martin A. Conway
- Adam Crawford
- Michael Crossley
- John Dumbrell
- Mary Gilhooly
- Pamela Gillies
- Chris Hale
- Helen Haste
- Graham Haughton
- Clive Hollin
- Diane Houston
- Angela Hull
- Glyn W. Humphreys
- Peter Jackson
- Alun Jones
- Martin Jones
- Diana Leonard
- Michael Levi
- Colin Mason
- David Mason
- Kieran McEvoy
- Eileen McLeod
- Juliet Mitchell
- Rosamund Mitchell
- John Mohan
- Robert Moore
- Judith Mudd
- Tim Newburn
- Jane Oakhill
- Christine Oughton
- Christopher Pickvance
- Graham Powell
- Rosemary Preston
- Robert Reiner
- Harry Rothman
- Robert Rowthorn
- Richard Sparks
- David Stanley
- Steven Tipper
- John Tribe
- Philip Tucker
- Lorna Unwin
- Sandra Walklate
- David S. Wall
- Andrew Webster
- Jeffrey Weeks
- Veronica Wong

=== December 2006 ===
There were 20 people elected to the fellowship in September 2006:

- David Campbell
- Guy Claxton
- Mark Conner
- Stuart Croft
- Rosemary Deem
- Christopher Dyer
- Rosalind Edwards
- Linda Hantrais
- Geoffrey Hodgson
- Richard Hoyle
- Mary James
- Neil Macrae
- Carl R. May
- Peter McKiernan
- Paul Ormerod
- Judith Petts
- Catherine Schenk
- Helen Lawton Smith
- Richard Smith
- Til Wykes

=== Prior to 2007 ===
These people are known to have been selected sometime prior to 2007:

- Rick Trainor
- Lawrence Freedman
- Paul Matthews
- Theresa Marteau
- Ken Young

=== 2007 ===
- Susan Castillo

=== 2008 ===
- Kelvyn Jones
- Andrew J. Jordan

=== 2009 ===
There were 64 people elected to the fellowship in 2009:

- John Allen
- Michael Anyadike-Danes
- Vernon Bogdanor
- Martyn Bond
- Sophie Bowlby
- Thom Brooks
- Jacqueline Burgess
- Tim Butler
- Timothy Clark
- Alistair Cole
- Diana Coole
- Douglas Davies
- Lorraine Dearden
- John Dunn
- Lewis Elton
- Anthony Forster
- Keith Glaister
- Keith Grint
- Alexander Haslam
- Colin Hay
- Robert Hetherington
- Celia Hoyles
- Janet Hunter
- Chris Huxham
- Ron Iphofen
- Michael Keating
- Emil Kirchner
- Saville Kushner
- John Leach
- Kevin Lee
- Robert Leonardi
- Peter Malpass
- John Mingers
- Michael Moran
- Elizabeth Murphy
- Emma Murphy
- David Nelken
- Frank Peck
- John Peterson
- Judith Phillips
- Bob Picciotto
- Laurence Ray
- John Richardson
- Anne Rogers
- Jim Rollo
- Thomas Scharf
- Drew Scott
- Michael Shackleton
- David Shanks
- Michael Sheppard
- David Simon
- Iram Siraj-Blatchford
- Maria Slowey
- Guy Standing
- John Stewart
- Gerry Stoker
- Michael Swan
- Howard Thomas
- Claire Wallace
- Paul Whitely
- Allan Williams
- David Wilson
- Fiona Wishlade
- Cecilia Wong

=== 2010 ===
There were 31 people elected to the fellowship in 2010:

- Waqar Ihsan-Ullah Ahmad
- Richard Andrews
- Halla Beloff
- Martin Bygate
- Lynne Cameron
- Julian Elliott
- Karen Evans
- Andy Green
- Helen Gunter
- Martyn Hammersley
- Peter Hannon
- Christian Heath
- Scott Lash
- Jane Lewis
- Peter Marsh
- Richard Noss
- Mark Olssen
- Shirin M. Rai
- Michael Reiss
- Alistair Ross
- Roger Awan-Scully
- Raymond G. Stokes
- Elizabeth Teague
- Graham Towl
- Georgina Waylen
- Paul Webb
- Frank Webster
- Li Wei
- Michael West
- Diana Wilkinson
- Sharon Witherspoon

=== February 2011 ===
There were 70 people elected to the fellowship in February 2011:

- Pauline Adair
- Paul Adamson
- Kathleen Armour
- Kate Barker
- John Baylis
- Andrew Beer
- Ron Boschma
- Allan Brimicombe
- Roger Burrows
- Noel Castree
- Ian Clarke
- Fiona Cownie
- Fiona Devine
- Philip Dewe
- Judith Dunn
- Kevin Durkin
- John Elliott
- Alan Felstead
- Bernard Fingleton
- Chris Gilleard
- Mark Goodwin
- Wyn Grant
- Ulrich Graute
- Robert Haining
- Alan Hamlin
- Seamus Hegarty
- Steve Hindle
- Wendy Hollway
- Barrie Houlihan
- Peter Jarvis
- Peter John
- Andrew Jones
- Allan Kellehear
- Peter Kemp
- Richard Kwiatkowski
- Wendy Larner
- Robert MacDonald
- Donald Angus MacKenzie
- Helen Margetts
- Duncan McCargo
- Colin J. McInnes
- Paul Milbourne
- Graham Moon
- Greg Myers
- Jamie Peck
- Andrés Rodríguez-Pose
- Philip Powell
- Colin Pritchard
- Vicky Pryce
- Michael Reed
- Stephen Reicher
- Eve Rosenhaft
- Judy Sebba
- Paschal Sheeran
- James Shields
- Peter K. Smith
- Liz Stanley
- Michael Storper
- Mark Tewdwr-Jones
- Alan Tomlinson
- Max Velmans
- Alan Warde
- Christopher Webster
- Paul White
- Sue White
- Malcolm Wicks
- Antje Wiener
- Jane Wills
- Steve Woolgar
- Mike Wright

=== October 2011 ===
There were 52 people elected to the fellowship in October 2011:

- Robin Alexander
- Bjorn Asheim
- Greg J. Bamber
- Christopher Bovis
- George Boyne
- Susan Cartwright
- Sarah Childs
- Amanda Coffey
- Joanne Conaghan
- Christopher Dandeker
- Panicos O. Demetriades
- Jenny Donovan
- Suzanne Fitzpatrick
- Matthew Flinders
- Jan Fook
- Gianni de Fraja
- Steve Fuller
- Andy Furlong
- Peter Gatrell
- Jonathan Gershuny
- Kenneth Gibb
- Richard Giulianotti
- Simon Green
- Steven Greer
- Barrie Gunter
- Henrik Halkier
- Robert Hazell
- Margaret Holloway
- Allison James
- David Lane
- Stephen Legomsky
- Alan Lewis
- Jim Love
- Rosalind Marsh
- Daryl O'Connor
- Nicholas O'Regan
- Hilary Pilkington
- Andrew Pithouse
- Andrew Pratt
- Charles Raab
- Kenneth Ruthven
- Steven Shardlow
- Denis Fischbacher-Smith
- Roger Smith
- Mark Stephens
- Penny Summerfield
- Cora Weber-Pillwax
- Robin Wensley
- Adrian Wilkinson
- Hugh Willmott
- Geof Wood
- Mary Dixon-Woods

=== 2012 ===
There were 63 people elected to the fellowship in 2012:

- Jackie Andrade
- Philip Arestis
- Clare Bambra
- Jonathan Beaverstock
- Nic Beech
- Tony Bennett
- Richard Black
- David Blunkett
- Alison Blunt
- Anthony Bradney
- Michael J. Bradshaw
- David Bridges
- Jacqui Briggs
- Pawan Budhwar
- Christopher Candlin
- James Conroy
- Terence Cox
- Philip Crang
- Heaven Crawley
- Teresa Cremin
- Paul Croll
- Leela Damodaran
- Christopher Day
- Klaus Dodds
- Lani Florian
- David Gibbs
- Jon Glasby
- Roger Goodman
- Robert Gray
- Morwenna Griffiths
- Peter Gronn
- James Hampton
- Philip Hanson
- Timothy Hatton
- David Forbes Hendry
- Valerie Hey
- Paul Heywood
- John Horne
- Rosemary Hunter
- Chris Husbands
- Anthony Kelly
- David Lavallee
- Michelle Lowe
- David Martin
- Matt Matravers
- John McCombie
- Paul Meara
- Bob Moon
- Edgar Morgenroth
- Rona Moss-Morris
- Debra Myhill
- Norbert Pachler
- Judith Pallot
- Michael Pidd
- Pat Pridmore
- David Raffe
- Peter Riddell
- Sheila Riddell
- Srikant Sarangi
- Peter Scott
- Keith Tester
- Peter Wostner
- Henry Wai-chung Yeung

=== March 2013 ===
There were 35 people elected to the fellowship in March 2013:

- Eric Anderson
- Judy Edworthy
- Paul Evans
- Marco Francesconi
- George Gaskell
- Grzegorz Gorzelak
- Mark D. Griffiths
- Sarah Grogan
- Malcolm Harrison
- Alan Holmans
- Barbara Harriss-White
- Jan Horwath
- David Hulme
- Hazel Johnson
- Naila Kabeer
- Keith Kirby
- Uma Kothari
- Michael Lamb
- Keith Lewin
- William Lindsay
- Fiona Mackay
- Lorna McKee
- Lydia Morris
- Paul Mosley
- Anne Phillips
- Kim Plunkett
- Jonathan Potter
- Peter Raynor
- Celia Roberts
- Constantine Sedikides
- Christopher Skelcher
- Gill Valentine
- Cyril Weir
- Ann Whitehead
- Ruth Wodak

=== August 2013 ===
There were 51 people elected to the fellowship in August 2013:

- Perri 6
- David Adams
- Martin Albrow
- Alison Anderson
- Adrian Bailey
- Jon Bannister
- Anne Barlow
- Michele Barrett
- Fran Bennett
- David Block
- Vanessa Burholt
- Matthew Carmona
- Neil Coe
- Philip Cowley
- Paul Crawford
- Stuart Cunningham
- John Curtice
- Stewart Fotheringham
- John Gabe
- Andrew Geddes
- Vincent Goodstadt
- Peter Hall
- Simon Halliday
- Stephen Hinchliffe
- Jenny Hockey
- Sarah Holloway
- Ian Rees Jones
- Desmond King
- Keith Kintrea
- Loretta Lees
- Constant Leung
- David Lyon
- Judith Masson
- Jon May
- David Morgan
- Linda Mulcahy
- Kevin Murray
- David Ormrod
- Stephen Osborne
- Joseph Painter
- Charles Pattie
- Christine Piper
- Lydia Plowman
- Philip Rees
- Tess Ridge
- Karen Rowlingson
- Neil Serougi
- Louise Stoll
- William Twining
- David Walker
- Anthony Gar-On Yeh

=== March 2014 ===
There were 28 people elected to the fellowship in March 2014:

- Peter Alldridge
- Jan Baars
- Suzy Braye
- Stephen Briggs
- Phillip Brown
- Mick Cooper
- Roger Cotterrell
- Brigid Featherstone
- Leslie J. Francis
- Susan Gathercole
- James Goodwin
- Owen Hargie
- Iain Hay
- John Heritage
- Jacqueline Hodgson
- Alan Irwin
- Robert Lindley
- Corinne May-Chahal
- Glynis Murphy
- Rory O'Connor
- John Pinkerton
- Denise Rousseau
- Peter Shirlow
- Bernard Silverman
- Carl Stychin
- Fran Wasoff
- Alison Wearden
- Bob Woods

=== September 2014 ===
There were 34 people elected to the fellowship in September 2014:

- Philip Allmendinger
- Arthur Aughey
- Ian Bache
- Jo Beall
- Richard Best, Baron Best
- Paul Boyle
- Peter Buckley
- Armando Carbonell
- Robert Chambers
- Michelle Cini
- Tony Dundon
- Louise Fitzgerald
- Francesca Gains
- Loraine Gelsthorpe
- Charles Gore
- Richard Hastings
- David Heald
- Glennys Howarth
- Stephen Hutchings
- Craig Jeffrey
- Jennifer Jenkins
- Peter Kirby
- Sarah Monk
- Nikos Ntoumanis
- Ian Rivers
- Elaine Sharland
- Nigel South
- Andrew Stark
- Corinne Swain
- Imogen Taylor
- Carole Torgerson
- Michael Wadsworth
- David Willetts
- Simon Williams

=== March 2015 ===
There were 33 people elected to the fellowship in March 2015:

- Yehuda Baruch
- Julian Birkinshaw
- Hugh Bochel
- Craig Calhoun
- Richard Collier
- Colin Copus
- David Crighton
- Vaneeta D'Andrea
- Nicholas Deakin
- Isabel Dyck
- Jane Elliott
- Jane Falkingham
- Becky Francis
- Theresa Gannon
- Rita Gardner
- Erica Haimes
- Sara Horrell
- Christopher Hughes
- David James
- David Jary
- Bob Kerslake
- Jill Manthorpe
- James Nazroo
- Edoardo Ongaro
- Deborah Oxley
- Martin Partington
- Andy Ross
- Hilary Sommerlad
- Aileen Stockdale
- Celia Wells
- Tim Whitaker
- Stephen Whittle
- James Wilsdon

=== October 2015 ===
There were 46 people elected to the fellowship in October 2015:

- Charles Alderson
- Alan Alexander
- Karl Atkin
- Dave Bartram
- John Beath
- Jan Bebbington
- David Bell
- Michael Bichard, Baron Bichard
- Genie Birch
- Jeffrey Braithwaite
- Ann Brooks
- Sylvia Chant
- Linda Clare
- Timothy M. Devinney
- Mark Exworthy
- Kiran Fernandes
- Stephen Frosh
- Nicholas Gallent
- Matthew Gandy
- Christopher Grey
- Karen Johnston
- Helen Kara
- David Lipsey, Baron Lipsey
- Kelvin MacDonald
- Anna Madill
- Russell Mannion
- Michael Murray
- Jane Ogden
- Eric Pentecost
- Jenny Phillimore
- Alison Pilnick
- Martin Powell
- Javaid Rehman
- Sasha Roseneil
- Louise Ryan
- Shamit Saggar
- Ingrid Schoon
- Neil Small
- Gareth Stansfield
- Ken Starkey
- Patricia Thomson
- Kavita Vedhara
- Judy Wajcman
- Ya Ping Wang
- Nicholas J. Wheeler
- Alys Young

=== March 2016 ===
There were 42 people elected to the fellowship in March 2016:

- Max Atkinson
- Katie Bailey
- Eileen Barker
- Frank Bechhofer
- Simon Biggs
- Harriet Bradley
- Shaun Breslin
- David Croisdale-Appleby
- Marguerite Dupree
- Nick Ellison
- David Farnham
- Michael Freeden
- Jamie Hacker Hughes
- Sue Heath
- Jeremy Howells
- Christopher Humphrey
- Ruth Kattumuri
- Hugh Lauder
- Richard Laughlin
- John MacInnes
- Josephine Maltby
- Beverley Milton-Edwards
- Laurence Moore
- Sarah Nettleton
- William Outhwaite
- Nicola Phillips
- Debora Price
- Louise Richardson
- Janette Rutterford
- Phillipp Schofield
- Darren Smith
- Patten Smith
- Paul Stenner
- John Thompson
- Rachel Thomson
- Valerie Walkerdine
- Sam Whimster
- Clare Williams
- Malcolm Williams
- Linda Woodhead
- Johanna Wyn
- Dominic Wyse

=== October 2016 ===
There were 84 people elected to the fellowship in October 2016:

- Stephen Aldridge
- Davina Allen
- Ellen Annandale
- John Appleby
- Madeleine Atkins
- Jo-Anne Baird
- Jacqueline Barnes
- Steven Barnett
- Derek Birrell
- Martin Bull
- Frances Cairncross
- Paul Cairney
- Rona Campbell
- Clelio Campolina Diniz
- Eamonn Carrabine
- Nancy Cartwright
- Catherine Cassell
- Peter Cheese
- David Clark
- David M. Clark
- Greg Clark
- Bill Cooke
- Diane Coyle
- Leam Craig
- Angela Creese
- Mary Daly
- David Denyer
- Gillian Douglas
- Hamilton Fairfax
- Peter Fonagy
- Ann Francke
- Lynn Froggett
- Deborah Ghate
- Paul Ghuman
- Karen Glaser
- Brendan Gough
- Chris Green
- Emily Grundy
- Andy Haldane
- David Halpern
- Bernard Harris
- Neville Harris
- Steven Higgins
- Guy Holmes
- William Housley
- Charles Hulme
- John Kay
- David Lane
- Richard Layard, Baron Layard
- Robert MacIntosh
- Tim May
- David McCrone
- Derek McGhee
- Simon McGrath
- Hamish McRae
- Nigel Meager
- Janice Morphet
- Vanessa Munro
- Mee Kam Ng
- Gus O'Donnell
- Anthony O'Sullivan
- Barry O'Sullivan
- Joaquim Oliveira Martins
- Ben Page
- Alison Park
- Alan Petersen
- Catherine Pope
- Peter Pope
- Mark Priestley
- Bridget Rosewell
- Amanda Rowlatt
- Eileen Scanlon
- Mitchell Silver
- Nicholas Stern, Baron Stern of Brentford
- Patrick Sturgis
- Carol Tannahill
- Matthew Taylor
- Anthony Teasdale
- Claire Tyler, Baroness Tyler of Enfield
- Martin Walker
- David Webster
- Peter Williams
- Fulong Wu
- Gary Younge

=== March 2017 ===
There were 47 people elected to the fellowship in March 2017:

- Jo Aldridge
- Les Back
- Charles Baden-Fuller
- Sharmistha Bagchi-Sen
- Paul Bartholomew
- Jeff Bishop
- Alison Bowes
- Adrian Burgess
- Jonathan Deer
- Theo Farrell
- Tess Fitzpatrick
- Luciano Floridi
- Ian Gazeley
- Gary Gillespie
- Barry Goldson
- John Haskey
- Anthea Hucklesby
- Mark Jenkins
- Carey Jewitt
- Alexandra Jones
- John Knagg
- Pauline Leonard
- Stephan Lewandowsky
- Desiree Lopez
- Katy Mason
- Ian Masser
- Nasar Meer
- Christopher Nobes
- Jim O'Neill, Baron O'Neill of Gatley
- Maury Peiperl
- Alison Phipps
- John Pullinger
- Helen Roberts
- Christopher Rodgers
- Joan R. Rosés
- Kirstein Rummery
- Eugene Sadler-Smith
- Andrew Seltzer
- Sally Sheldon
- Graham Smith
- Andy Stirling
- Patrick Tissington
- Azrini Wahidin
- Patrick Wallis
- Kaye Wellings
- Alan Wenban-Smith
- Jane Whittle

=== October 2017 ===
There were 69 people elected to the fellowship in October 2017:

- Svenja Adolphs
- Claire Alexander
- Louise Archer
- Michael Baynham
- Frans Berkhout
- William Bowring
- David Buchanan
- Pamela Campanelli
- Rebecca Chiu
- Peter Clinch
- Simon Collinson
- Paul Connolly
- Davina Cooper
- Viviene Cree
- Jonathan Crook
- Emma Donaldson-Feilder
- Joanne Duberley
- Simon Duncan
- Keri Facer
- Colette Fagan
- Sarah Franklin
- Trevor Gale
- Rachel Griffith
- Anthony Hall
- Richard Harris
- Marianne Hester
- Simona Iammarino
- Mark Israel
- Robyn Jones
- Andrew Kendrick
- Martin Kitchener
- Susanne Küchler
- Heather Laurie
- George Chu-sheng Lin
- Sonia Livingstone
- Vivien Lowndes
- Celia Lury
- Peter Lynn
- Fiona Magowan
- Jackie Marsh
- Natasha Mauthner
- Mariana Mazzucato
- Timothy McNamara
- Geoffrey Meen
- Paul Miller
- Arthur C. Nelson
- Alan Paterson
- Adrian Penfold
- Stephen Platt
- Sally Power
- Zoe Radnor
- Justin Rosenberg
- Andrew Sanders
- Jackie Scully
- Jonathan Spencer
- Karl Spracklen
- William Spurlin
- Jeanette Steemers
- Wendy Sykes
- Brian Taylor
- Vera Tolz
- Susan Van Scoyoc
- Peter Waldron
- Craig Watkins
- Matthew Weait
- Stephen Webb
- Cynthia Weber
- Teresa Williams
- Wei Yang

=== April 2018 ===
There were 58 people elected to the fellowship in April 2018:

- Julie Allan
- Vivienne Marie Baumfield
- Kalwant Bhopal
- Sarah Birch
- Mark Birkin
- Katrina Brown
- Wändi Bruine de Bruin
- Rosie Campbell
- Christopher Cramer
- Garry Crawford
- Elizabeth Dowler
- Rosaleen Duffy
- Peter Dwyer
- Trudi Elliott
- Rebecca Endean
- Terry Farrell
- Scott Fleming
- John Flint
- Jefferson Frank
- Caroline Gatrell
- Frank Geels
- Ann-Marie Gray
- Jane Green
- Chris Greer
- Debrah Harding
- Alma Harris
- Colette Henry
- Kathryn Hochstetler
- Peter Hopkins
- Paula Hyde
- Beate Jahn
- Deborah James
- Will Jennings
- Paul Johnson
- Michael Keith
- Ray Land
- Liz Lloyd
- Simon Marginson
- Kenneth McPhail
- Kathleen Montgomery
- Rachel Pain
- Gavin Parker
- Nicholas Pearce
- Jonathan Portes
- Claudio Radelli
- Diane Richardson
- Nikolas Rose
- Dale Southerton
- Matthew Taylor, Baron Taylor of Goss Moor
- Peter Tufano
- John Turner
- Jeffrey Unerman
- Satnam Virdee
- Richard Wakeford
- Angelia Wilson
- Michael Woods
- Ian Wray
- Nuala Zahedieh

=== October 2018 ===
There were 43 people elected to the fellowship in October 2018:

- Julia Balogun
- Clive Barnett
- Richard Blyth
- Glen Bramley
- Bo Chen
- Andrew Chesher
- David Clapham
- Nelarine Cornelius
- Graeme Currie
- Kevin Daly
- Hugo Dobson
- Sue Dopson
- Robert Erens
- Brian Evans
- Eirini Flouri
- Alison Garnham
- Cathy Gormley-Heenan
- Alison Harcourt
- Michael Hayes
- David Johnson
- Ade Kearns
- Gail Kinman
- Mei-Po Kwan
- Ivana La Valle
- Anna Lawson
- Feng Li
- Sharon Mavin
- Clare McGlynn
- Colin Mellors
- Caroline Moser
- Geraldine Nicolaas
- Andrew Pritchard
- Rebecca Probert
- Kathleen Rastle
- Trish Reay
- David Robinson
- Bo Sin Tang
- Rebecca Tunstall
- Nicholas Wikeley
- Geoffrey Wood
- Ngaire Woods
- Jieming Zhu
- Peer Zumbansen

=== March 2019 ===
There were 73 people elected to the fellowship in March 2019:

- Neil Adger
- Stephen Anderson
- Georgios Antonopoulos
- Christopher Armitage
- Linda Bauld
- Tony Blackshaw
- Alice Bloch
- Christina Boswell
- Susan Bright
- Rachel Brooks
- Michael Burton
- Judith Cashmore
- Tarani Chandola
- David Collings
- Ross Coomber
- Roisin Corcoran
- Howard Davis
- David Demeritt
- Jean-Louis Denis
- Joe Devine
- Jenny Dibden
- Helga Dittmar
- Jane Duckett
- Leon Feinstein
- Simone Fullagar
- Alison Fuller
- Kristian Gleditsch
- Dabo Guan
- Mark Harrison
- Jo Hart
- David Hughes
- Adele Jones
- Caroline Knowles
- Tim Leunig
- Louise Locock
- Louise Mallinder
- William Maloney
- Robin Mansell
- Stephen McKay
- Paul Mizen
- Richard Moorhead
- Victor Murinde
- Karim Murji
- Anastasia Nesvetailova
- Melanie Nind
- Wendy Olsen
- Kevin O’Rourke
- Carrie Paechter
- Inderjeet Parmar
- Susan Parnell
- Hester Parr
- Steve Pile
- Jane Pollard
- Gary N. Powell
- Carol Propper
- Sarah Radcliffe
- Rafael Ramirez
- Gillian Rose
- Mark Saunders
- Joanne Scott
- Elizabeth Shepherd
- Julie-Marie Strange
- Mark Stuart
- Andrew Tatem
- Ian Tonks
- Imogen Tyler
- Sarah Vickerstaff
- Justin Waring
- Rorden Wilkinson
- Daniel Wincott
- Sharon Wright
- Belinda Yuen

=== October 2019 ===
There were 65 people elected to the fellowship in October 2019:

- Peter Ackers
- Tera Allas
- Louise Arseneault
- Mark Banks
- David Bell
- Torsten Bell
- Sonia Bhalotra
- Sarah Blandy
- Annette Boaz
- Vikki Boliver
- Harriet Bulkeley
- Michele Burman
- Brian Castellani
- Jagjit Chadha
- Patrick Clarke
- Samantha Clemens
- Feargal Cochrane
- Neil Crosby
- Nick Crossley
- Robert Cuthbert
- Helen Dickinson
- Claire Dunlop
- Peter Elias
- Linda Evans
- Sharon Gewirtz
- Rachel Gibson
- Barry Godfrey
- Ivor Goodson
- Guy Goodwin
- Simon Hackett
- Veronica Hope Hailey
- Robin Hambleton
- Rosie Harding
- Penny Harvey
- John Hassard
- Martin Innes
- Paul Jackson
- John Kelly
- Robert Lee
- Martin Lodge
- Becky P. Y. Loo
- Colette McAuley
- Morag McDermont
- Petra Meier
- Elizabeth Meins
- Anand Menon
- Melinda Mills
- Peter Moizer
- Davide Nicolini
- Paul Nightingale
- Henrietta O'Connor
- Jacqueline O'Reilly
- David Parsons
- Edward Peck
- Jo Richardson
- Jill Rubery
- Anthony Seldon
- Elena Semino
- Falko Sniehotta
- Veronica Strang
- Lígia Teixeira
- Peter Wade
- Jim Watson
- Lisa Webley
- Zhu Hua

=== March 2020 ===
There were 51 people elected to the fellowship in March 2020:

- Nick Bailey
- Ravinder Barn
- Bernardo Batiz-Lazo
- Jacqueline-Aundrée Baxter
- Emma Bell
- Alexander Betts
- Jon Billsberry
- Janet Boddy
- Karen Broadhurst
- Stephan Collishaw
- Megan Crawford
- Kevin Daniels
- Patrick Diamond
- Pauline Dibben
- Mike Emmerich
- David Fraser
- Nicholas Fyfe
- Joe Grice
- Paul Grice
- Sarah Hall
- Susan Hart
- Ian Harwood
- Robert Hollands
- Alexandra Hughes
- Jason Hughes
- Kimberly Hutchings
- Mary Kaldor
- Norah Keating
- Peter Kraftl
- Ann Langley
- Audrey MacDougall
- Deirdre McCann
- Ruth McDonald
- Janice McLaughlin
- Alisoun Milne
- Mairead Nic Craith
- David Norgrove
- Margaret O'Brien
- Parvati Raghuram
- Tom Rodden
- Jennifer Rubin
- Benjamin K. Sovacool
- David Sugarman
- Isabelle Szmigin
- Shlomo Tarba
- Yvette Taylor
- Liz Todd
- Colin Tyler
- Gordon Walker
- Philip Woods
- Sue Yeandle

=== October 2020 ===
There were 73 people elected to the fellowship in October 2020:

- Claire Annesley
- Diamond Ashiagbor
- Sheena Asthana
- Suma Athreye
- Paul Baker
- Susan Banducci
- Ruth Boaden
- Frances Bowen
- Bridget Byrne
- Nigel Campbell
- Siobhan Campbell
- Jackie Carter
- Claire Colomb
- Andrea Cornwall
- Harry Dimitriou
- lain Docherty
- Sheila Dow
- Bobby Duffy
- Anthony Elliott
- Hugh Ellis
- Akwugo Emejulu
- James Fairhead
- Rory Fitzgerald
- Jacqui Gabb
- David Gadd
- Peter Geraghty
- Susan Golombok
- John Goodwin
- Irina Grugulis
- Gemma Harper
- Jackie Harrison
- Katy Hayward
- Karin von Hippel
- Damian Hodgson
- Tobias Kelly
- Michael Kenny
- Eleonore Kofman
- Martin Laffin
- Charlie Lewis
- Hui Lin
- Yipeng Liu
- Phil Macnaghten
- Ziyad Marar
- Graham Martin
- Fiona Matthews
- Aoife McDermott
- Susan McVie
- Christoph Meyer
- Daniel Miller
- Maxine Molyneux
- Catia Montagna
- Jonathan Morris
- Geoff Mulgan
- Kate Nation
- Waheed Nazir
- Jeremy Neathey
- David Owen
- John Pendlebury
- David Phinnemore
- Lucinda Platt
- Gillian Prior
- Kate Reed
- Heather Rolfe
- Natalie Shlomo
- Crispin Shore
- Christina Silver
- Richard Simmons
- Richard Walker
- Rob White
- Karl Wilding
- John Wilson
- Matthew Woollard
- Maja Zehfuss

=== February 2021 ===
There were 37 people elected to the fellowship in February 2021:

- Madelynne Arden
- Timothy Baines
- Adrian Blackledge
- Janine Bosak
- Christopher Chapman
- David Collins
- Lynn Prince Cooke
- Prasanta Dey
- Giana Eckhardt
- Vernon Gayle
- Rose Gilroy
- Yoram Gorlizki
- Stephen Hardy
- David Hassan
- Ailsa Henderson
- Noreena Hertz
- Beng Huat See
- Joanne Hughes
- Will Hutton
- Divya Jindal-Snape
- Zaheer Khan
- Xia Li
- Jeannette Littlemore
- Brad MacKay
- Danny MacKinnon
- Lee Elliot Major
- Vanessa May
- Sian Moore
- David Mosse
- Sheilagh Ogilvie
- Maggie O'Neill
- Martyn Pickersgill
- Monder Ram
- Alison Shaw
- Tracy Shildrick
- Sally Shortall
- Richard Smith

=== September 2021 ===
There were 74 people elected to the fellowship in September 2021:

- Tahir Abbas
- Sabina Alkire
- Véronique Ambrosini
- Thankom Arun
- Andrew Barry
- Kelly Beaver
- Sam Beckett
- lain Bell
- Gurminder Bhambra
- Lorraine van Blerk
- David Booth
- Dermot Bowler
- Paul Bradshaw
- Jonathan Breckon
- Lucie Byrne-Davis
- Robert Chote
- Viki Cooke
- Jeremy Crampton
- Patricia Daley
- Pamela Maureen Denicolo
- Adam Dennett
- Meryem Duygun
- Mark Easton
- Stuart Fancey
- Xiaolan Fu
- Mark Galeotti
- Frances Gardner
- Sayantan Ghosal
- Samuel Greene
- Margaret Greenfields
- Mordechai Haklay
- Laura Hammond
- Shenjing He
- Kate Henderson
- Jane Holgate
- Jennifer Howard-Grenville
- Cecile Jackson
- Clare Kelliher
- Stewart Lansley
- Nina Laurie
- Sergio lavicoli
- Antonia Layard
- Melissa Leach
- Stavroula Leka
- Jo Little
- Clare Lombardelli
- Graham Miller
- Diana Mitlin
- Giles Mohan
- Emmanuel Ogbonna
- Adrian Pabst
- Sabu Padmadas
- Kathryn Pain
- Jamie Pearce
- John Preston
- Campbell Robb
- Kimberley Scharf
- Monika Schmid
- Tim Schwanen
- Minouche Shafik
- Wenzhong Shi
- Elisabete Silva
- Frances Stewart
- Andy Sumner
- Philip Taylor
- Malcolm Tight
- Michaela Trippl
- Liz Varga
- Bhaskar Vira
- Tim Vorley
- Anne White
- Dariusz Wójcik
- Kataryna Wolczuk
- Kathryn Woodward

=== March 2022 ===
There were 47 people elected to the fellowship in March 2022:

- Lynn Ang
- Neil Chakraborti
- Ha-Joon Chang
- William Clark
- Matthew Cole
- Fiona Copland
- Kavita Datta
- Feyisa Demie
- Esther Dermott
- Pauline Dixon
- Miatta Fahnbulleh
- Susan Fainstein
- John Field
- Edward Fieldhouse
- Robert Ford
- Glenn Fulcher
- Peter Fussey
- Paula Giliker
- Penelope Green
- Damian Grimshaw
- Philip Haynes
- Geraldine Healy
- Nola Hewitt-Dundas
- Klaus Hubacek
- Patricia Hynes
- Misa Izuhara
- Rodney Jones
- Tatia Lee
- David Ley
- Cathy Mcllwaine
- Chris Millward
- Richard Murphy
- Polly Neate
- Martin Orrell
- Lesley Palmer
- Jenny Pickerill
- Kate Pickett
- Jennie Popay
- Erika Rackley
- Allen J. Scott
- Lisa Scullion
- Katherine Smith
- Lynda Taylor
- Athina Vlachantoni
- Jackline Wahba
- Tracey Warren
- Joanna Wilde

=== September 2022 ===
There were 40 people elected to the fellowship in September 2022:

- Paul Barnard
- Michaela Benzeval
- Gargi Bhattacharyya
- Gillian Bristow
- Alison Brown
- Alex Bryson
- Andrew Chadwick
- Joanna Chataway
- Rosie Cox
- Tom Crick
- Bronwyn Curtis
- Caroline Dyer
- Qing Gu
- Ghassan Hage
- Nicky Hayes
- Andrew Hudson-Smith
- Helen Kennedy
- Helen Lambert
- Cristina lannelli
- Louise Mansfield
- Peter Merriman
- Aileen Murphie
- Alis Oancea
- Emma Parry
- Ian Preston
- Tracey Reynolds
- Emma Rich
- Michael Sanders
- Michele Schweisfurth
- Susie Scott
- Niamh Shortt
- Nidhi Singal
- Anthony Soares
- Matthew Spry
- Leon Tikly
- Paul Trowler
- Steve Tsang
- Denise Whitelock
- Carole Willis
- Tanya Wyatt

=== March 2023 ===
There were 55 people elected to the fellowship in March 2023:

- Nicola Ansell
- Natalie Armstrong
- Nick Bibby
- Elaine Campbell
- Louise Casey, Baroness Casey of Blackstock
- Andrew Choo
- John Denham
- Martin Dixon
- Thomas Dobson
- David Egan
- Giovanni Facchini
- Claire Farrow
- James Foreman-Peck
- Franz Fuerst
- Anthony Green
- Bishnupriya Gupta
- Paul Hibbert
- Helen Higson
- Bernardette Holmes
- Rusi Jaspal
- Rhys Jones
- Robert Klassen
- Anthony Liddicoat
- Chen Lin
- Hualou Long
- Carl Macrae
- Anne-Marie McAlinden
- Marie McHugh
- Friederike Mengel
- Anna Mountford-Zimdars
- Patricia Noxolo
- Franklin Obeng-Odoom
- Raquel Ortega-Argiles
- Tessa Parkes
- George Peretz
- Ann Pettifor
- Lisa de Propris
- Mo Ray
- Paula Reavey
- Deborah Riby
- Tirthankar Roy
- Toby Seddon
- Deirdre Shaw
- Nadia Siddiqui
- Diana Slade
- David Smith
- Laura Spence
- Kitty Stewart
- Philip Tomlinson
- Nick Vaughan-Williams
- Chris Warhurst
- Karen Wells
- Rebekah Widdowfield
- Tim Williams
- Dimitri Zenghelis

=== October 2023 ===
There were 47 people elected to the fellowship in October 2023:

- David Abbott
- Anya Ahmed
- Angharad Beckett
- David Bewley-Taylor
- Richard Blundell
- Wendy Carlin
- Mike Clancy
- Lucie Cluver
- D’Maris Coffman
- Giorgia Doná
- Susan Easton
- Alex Edmans
- Gitanjali Nain Gill
- Judith Harford
- Alison Koslowski
- John Llewellyn
- Joan Loughrey
- Muiris MacCarthaigh
- Adam Marshall
- Robert McMaster
- Auriol Miller
- Peter Murphy
- Marina Novelli
- Onyeka Osuji
- Tejendra Pherali
- Amanda Perry-Kessaris
- Neil Pollock
- Jiří Přibáň
- Imran Rasul
- Cheryl Regehr
- Ricardo Sabates
- Russell Sandberg
- Nick Saville
- Alister Scott
- Gavin Smart
- Sarah Smith
- Will Snell
- Neil Spencer
- Philip Stephens
- Allen Thurston
- Kitty Ussher
- Robert Vanderbeck
- Louise Waite
- Paresh Wankhade
- Rob Whiteman
- Frank Witlox
- Pengjun Zhao

=== March 2024 ===
There were 41 people elected to the fellowship in March 2024:

- Michele Acuto
- Sarah Ayres
- John Boswell
- Tine Buffel
- Carlos Carrillo-Tudela
- Stephanie Decker
- Emilia Del Bono
- Kezia Dugdale
- Ruth Dukes
- Carl Emmerson
- Marie Fox
- Tim Gardam
- Karen Guldberg
- Paul Hackett
- Carol Holland
- Matthew Johnson
- Stephen D. King
- Dina Kiwan
- Melanie Klinkner
- Huck-ju Kwon
- Stuart Macdonald
- Ambreena Manji
- Ruth McAreavey
- Gráinne McKeever
- Chris Minns
- Daniel Monk
- Thérèse Murphy
- Jemina Napier
- Sarah Neal
- Catherine Needham
- Nicholas Phelps
- Lorna Philip
- Fernanda Pirie
- George Saridakis
- Rosalind Searle
- Sharifah Sekalala
- Gillian Tett
- Wendy Thomson
- Mark Walters
- Stian Westlake
- Tim Wildschut

=== September 2024 ===
There were 45 people elected to the fellowship in September 2024:

- Judith Aldridge
- Ana Aliverti
- Lisa Anderson
- Ed Balls
- Sascha Becker
- Zoë Billingham
- Constantin Blome
- George Buckley
- Sara Carter
- Gemma Catney
- Anita Charlesworth
- James Cheshire
- John Craig
- Steven Cummins
- Catherine Durose
- Jean-Paul Faguet
- Anne-Maree Farrell
- Alan Finlayson
- Pervez Ghauri
- Neve Gordon
- Matt Henn
- Kirsty Horsey
- Alexander Kemp
- Meryl Kenny
- Urfan Khaliq
- Cristina Leston-Bandeira
- Jo Littler
- Christopher Lloyd
- Mhairi Mackenzie
- Gerardo J. Meléndez-Torres
- Sarah Mills
- Charles Musselwhite
- Daniel Nettle
- Emma Roe
- Thomas J. Roulet
- Mark Scott
- Thomas Scotto
- Nando Sigona
- Alex Singleton
- Martin Spring
- Helen Stalford
- Gabriel Stylianides
- Martyna Śliwa
- Shahzad Uddin
- Simon Winlow

=== April 2025 ===
There were 64 people elected to the fellowship in April 2025:

- Gloria Agyemang
- Clare Anderson
- Margaret Arnott
- Michaela Benson
- Ruth Blakeley
- Stefan Bouzarovski
- Lisa Calderwood
- Paul James Cardwell
- Helen Carr
- Helena Farrand Carrapico
- Tao Cheng
- Emilie Cloatre
- Rob Coe
- Michael Cross
- Ayona Datta
- Hartley Dean
- Cathrine Degnen
- Lauren Devine
- Patrick Devine-Wright
- Máiréad Dunne
- Sibel Erduran
- Irene-Marie Esser
- Bethan Evans
- Jennifer Gold
- Michael Goodman
- Emma Gordon
- Roberta Guerrina
- Toni Haastrup
- Jonathan Haskel
- Stephani Hatch
- Kathryn Haynes
- Christopher Hill
- M. Azizul Islam
- Lisa Jack
- Susan Jarvis
- John Jerrim
- Andrew Jones
- Caroline Kennedy-Pipe
- Anne Kerr
- Zhigang Li
- Sander van der Linden
- Colin Lindsay
- Geraldine Macdonald
- Sherilyn MacGregor
- Craig McLaren
- Zhifu Mi
- Matthew Paterson
- Nancy Preston
- Mike Raco
- Howard Reed
- Chrissie Rogers
- Teela Sanders
- Eleanor Shaw
- Sally Sheard
- Hyun Bang Shin
- Jo Swaffield
- Gabriel Siles-Brügge
- Einar Thorsen
- Kenneth Thomson
- Morag Treanor
- Mark Webber
- Richard Wiggins
- Sophie Woodward
- Nicola Yeates

== See also ==
- List of social sciences awards
