= Peter Marsh =

Peter Marsh may refer to:

- Peter Marsh (social scientist) (born 1950), British academic in the fields of sociology and social work
- Pete Marsh, Iron Age bog body
- Peter Marsh (athlete) (1948–2012), Australian Paralympian
- Peter Marsh (ice hockey) (born 1956), Canadian ice hockey player
- Peter Marsh (field hockey) (born 1951), British field hockey player
- Peter Marsh (musician) (born 1952), British singer, songwriter, guitarist and music producer
