= Paul Connolly =

Paul Connolly may refer to:

- Paul Connolly (footballer), English footballer
- Paul Connolly (cricketer) (born 1990), Jersey cricketer
- Paul Connolly (education professor), British academic
- Paul Connolly (journalist), investigative reporter
- Paul Connolly (music publisher), music publisher
- Paul Connolly (politician) (born 1946), Canadian politician
