= Tatia Lee =

Clinical psychologist

Tatia Mei Chun Lee FAcSS (Chinese: 李湄珍) is a Hong Kong clinical psychologist specializing in neuropsychology and human neuroscience. She is the May Endowed Professor in Neuropsychology and chair of psychological science and clinical psychology at the University of Hong Kong.

Lee is a fellow of the American Psychological Association, Association for Psychological Science, and The World Academy of Sciences. She was elected Fellow of the Academy of Social Sciences in 2022.

== Education and Early career ==
Lee earned a Master of Education degree in 1992 and a PhD in 1995 from the University of Alberta. After completing her doctoral studies, she joined the University of Hong Kong in 1996."Alumni Recognition Awards". University of Alberta."Outstanding Researcher Award". University of Hong Kong Bulletin.
