= Cynthia Weber =

American academic

Cynthia Weber is a professor of international relations at Sussex University, UK, and co-director of the media company Pato Productions.

Cynthia Weber was born in New Jersey, US, and raised in Pennsylvania. She received a BA in political science from West Virginia University (1983), an MA from Sussex University (1985), and a PhD from Arizona State University (1990). She held a postdoctoral fellowship at the University of Southern California (1989–1990) and has held visiting appointments at numerous universities including the New School University, the University of Arizona, University of Wales, Aberystwyth, and Queen's University Belfast in Northern Ireland. Weber trained as a filmmaker in the early 2000s at the University of Leeds. She is also an affiliated scholar with the Graduate Program in International Affairs and the Observatory for Latin America at the New School University in New York City.

She has published several internationally recognized books on topics ranging from US foreign policy and international relations to theory and film, including Simulating Sovereignty (Cambridge University Press, 1995), Imagining America at War (Routledge, 2006) and 'I am an American: Filming the Fear of Difference (Intellect Books, 2011). Her 1999 book, Faking It: American Power in the Post-Phallic Age is widely considered a classic for its use of gender-queer theory. Her article 'Reconsidering Statehood: Examining the Sovereignty/Intervention Boundary' won the British International Studies Prize for the best article published in the journal Review of International Studies in its year. Weber regularly contributes to BBC Radio 4's Woman's Hour.

In her 40s, Weber trained as a filmmaker. She writes, produces, directs, and edits films that critically engage with US identity, US citizenship, and US human rights practices. She is best known for her selection of 14 films called I am an American: Video Portraits of Post-9/11 US Citizens. This work has been published on OpenDemocracy.net and was invited by the Board of the 11 September Memorial Museum to be part of the museum's permanent collection.

On 12 October 2017 she became a Fellow of the Academy of Social Sciences.
