= Jo-Anne Baird =

English professor

Jo-Anne Baird, FAcSS is the Pearson Professor of Educational Assessment at the University of Oxford and a Fellow of St Anne's College. She is also a visiting professor at Queen's University Belfast. She was formerly head of research for the Assessment and Qualifications Alliance.

== Honours ==
In 2016, Baird was elected a Fellow of the Academy of Social Sciences (FAcSS).
