= Steven Tipper =

British cognitive psychologist

Steven Tipper FAcSS FLSW FBA is a British psychologist who specialises in cognitive psychology. His research is focused on areas such as the perception of other people's actions and using simulation to understand human behaviour. He held the Chair in Cognitive Science at Bangor University (1993–2013), where he directed the Wolfson Centre of Clinical and Cognitive Neuroscience (2004–07); since 2013 he has been Professor of Psychology and emeritus professor at the University of York.

== Career ==
After graduating from the University of Oxford in 1984 with a DPhil, Tipper began his academic career in Canada, working at Mount Allison University from 1985 to 1989, before moving to McMaster University, where he was Associate Professor (1989–93).

From 1993 to 2013, Tipper was Professor of Cognitive Psychology and held the Chair in Cognitive Science at Bangor University. He directed the Wolfson Centre of Clinical and Cognitive Neuroscience at Bangor (2004–07). During his time at Bangor, Tipper was also a visiting professor at Melbourne University (1999) and the Max Planck Institute (2001). He joined the University of York in 2013, as Professor of Psychology and then emeritus professor.

Tipper was the editor of the Quarterly Journal of Experimental Psychology (2009–12).

== Honours and awards ==
Tipper is an elected fellow of the Academy of Social Sciences and a Fellow of the British Academy (2007). He was a founding fellow of the Learned Society of Wales (2010). His awards include the Presidents Award of the British Psychological Society (2004) and the Mid-Career Award of the Experimental Psychology Society (2009).
