= Parvati Raghuram =

Academic geographer

- Education: University of Delhi; University of Newcastle-upon-Tyne
- Occupation: Professor

Parvati Raghuram is an academic geographer and Professor of Geography and Migration at the Open University in the United Kingdom. She is a Fellow of the Academy of Social Sciences.

== Background ==
Raghuram was born in Shillong, in Meghalaya state in India. She then migrated around the country, but spent the largest proportion of her childhood in Delhi.

She then attended the University of Delhi's School of Economics, between 1982 and 1985, where she gained a Bachelor of Arts in Geography. Between 1985 and 1987, she studied a Master of Arts in Geography, also at the University of Delhi, and was awarded the qualification.

She and her spouse moved to the United Kingdom together in 1987.

== Career ==
Raghuram completed her PhD in geography at the University of Newcastle-upon-Tyne in 1991. Her thesis was entitled: Coping strategies of domestic workers: A study of three settlements in the Delhi Metropolitan region, India.

Starting in 1994, Raghuram was a lecturer in geography at Nottingham Trent University.

By 2005, Raghuram had been one of the editors on special editions, of journals, that focussed on migration and gender. Starting in 2005, Raghuram worked at the Open University.

As of 2013, Raghuram was Reader in Geography at the Open University.

As of 2016, Raghuram was awarded the Murchison Award by the Royal Geographical Society. She was the first woman of colour to receive the award.

In she co-wrote a research paper focusing on female migrants from India to the EU; the research paper was for a project called the European Union-UK Cooperation and Dialogue on Migration and Mobility, by the International Labour Office, which is now called the International Labour Organization and is a UN agency.

By May 2025, Raghuram had authored reports for several UN agencies and thinktanks, and her academic output included nine research pieces, most of which are research articles, co-authored with academic geographers Clare Madge and Patricia Noxolo.

As of May 2025, Raghuram is Professor of Geography and Migration at the Open University, and her research focuses on how the world is being reshaped by the geographical movement of goods, people and intellectual outputs. Much of her work has focused on changing the theorisations of migration of more educated migrants and of international students. Also as of May 2025 she is involved in a number of research projects focusing on people migrating from one place in Africa to another.

She has written for OpenDemocracy and been interviewed by the website Womanthology.

She has also been the research director and postgraduate director of the OpenSPACE research centre; the centre focuses on researching inclusivity in accessing outdoor spaces.

== Personal life ==
In a 2016 interview, Raghuram stated that regulations relating to migration were part of the reason for her having to be employed part-time for several years in the early part of her academic career.
