= Shamit Saggar =

Shamit Saggar CBE FAcSS (born August 1963) is professor of public policy at the University of Western Australia where he is also Director of the Public Policy Institute. He is also visiting professor in the Policy Institute at King’s College, London, and emeritus professor of political science at the University of Essex.

His scholarship primarily concerns public policy and politics with specialist knowledge of migration, regulation, violent extremism, political participation and social cohesion. He has held senior roles in government, regulation, commerce, non-profits and philanthropy.

He is a Fellow of the UK Academy of Social Sciences, and in 2017 he was appointed a CBE in the Queen's Birthday Honours for services to social science and public policy.

== Earlier career ==
He was previously associate pro-vice-chancellor (research) at the University of Essex, Director of the ESRC South-East Social Science Network Doctoral Training Partnership and a professor of political science at the Institute for Social & Economic Research (ISER), University of Essex. He was previously professor of political science at the University of Sussex; an ESRC Knowledge Exchange Fellow in the UK Home Office; a Yale World Fellow at Yale University; Senior Advisor at the Prime Minister's Strategy Unit, Cabinet Office, HM Government; and reader in political behaviour at Queen Mary, University of London. He was a Harkness Fellow at the University of California, Los Angeles, and a lecturer in public policy at the University of Liverpool. He has also been a visiting professor at the University of Toronto and Menzies Fellow at the Australian National University.

== Public leadership ==
He has taken an active part in board leadership roles, including:

- The Conversation Australian Editorial Board
- Committee for Economic Development of Australia Migration Advisory Committee
- Office for Students Provider Risk Committee
- Financial Services Authority
- Solicitors Regulation Authority
- Law Society Legal Complaints Service (Chair)
- Campaign for Social Science (Chair)
- UPP Group Holdings Ltd (Chair)
- Association of British Insurers Consumer Impact Panel
- British Future
- Wilton Park Advisory Council
- National Asylum Commission
- Better Regulation Commission
- National Consumer Council
- Whittington Hospital Trust
- Peabody Trust
- Accountancy Foundation Ethics Standards Board
- Institute for Citizenship
- Foreign Policy Centre Global Britons Program
- RSA Migration Commission

== Advisory roles ==
He has held advisory roles with:

- Unbound Philanthropy
- Demos
- Policy Exchange
- Institute for Public Policy Research
- Special Advisor to the Commonwealth Secretariat/Sen Commission
- Special Advisor to House of Common's Speaker's Conference on Parliamentary Representation

== Research ==
His early work led to the publication of Race and Representation (Manchester University Press) that provided new insights on UK voting behaviour and role of the ethnicity as a source of political difference and policy choice. He later published Pariah Politics (Oxford University Press) that systematically examined the causes of radicalisation among western Muslim groups and traced this understanding to the efficacy of different policy strategies open to democratic governments.

The author of six books, over 60 articles in scientific journals and 20 major policy reports, he has also been a frequent op-ed contributor to UK, US and Australian newspapers. His regularly collaborates with prominent think-tanks – for example, Regulation and Fairness (with Policy Network on the centre-left), setting out the case for a pro-active role among market and public service regulators, and Bittersweet Success?, (with Policy Exchange on the centre-right), highlighting the practical way forward for boards in ensuring reputational fairness in senior jobs.

== Selected publications ==
- Race and Politics in Britain. Prentice-Hall, 1992. ISBN 0745012051
- Race and Representation: Electoral Politics and Ethnic Pluralism in Britain. Manchester University Press, Manchester 2000. ISBN 0719059879
- Pariah Politics: Understanding Western Radical Islamism and What Should be Done. Oxford University Press, 2008. ISBN 0199558132
