= Gillian Douglas =

British legal scholar

Gillian Douglas, FBA, FAcSS, FLSW is a British legal scholar who specialises in family law. She was dean of The Dickson Poon School of Law at King's College London. She undertook the first empirical study into access to fertility treatment under the Human Fertilisation and Embryology Authority's Code of Practice.

== Honours ==
In 2012, Douglas was elected a Fellow of the Learned Society of Wales. In 2016, Douglas was elected a Fellow of the Academy of Social Sciences (FAcSS). In July 2017, she was elected a Fellow of the British Academy (FBA), the United Kingdom's national academy for the humanities and social sciences.

== Selected publications ==
- An Introduction to Family Law (2001: Oxford University Press, 2nd edition 2004)
- Bromley's Family Law (9th ed. 1998, 10th ed, 2006, 11th ed, 2015, Oxford University Press), co-author (with Nigel Lowe)
- Law and Parenthood (1995: Butterworths Law in Context series), (with Chris Barton)
- Child Support: The Legislation (1st ed 1993, 2nd ed 1995, 3rd ed 1997: Sweet & Maxwell), (with Edward Jacobs)
