= Colette Henry =

Irish social scientist

Colette Henry is an Irish social scientist and international scholar who is Head of the Department of Business Studies at Dundalk Institute of Technology. She is a Fellow of the Academy of Social Sciences and the founding editor of The International Journal of Gender and Entrepreneurship.

== Education ==
Henry completed a B.A. in Spanish and Italian at Queen's University Belfast in 1985, an MBA in Management at the Open University in 1995, and a PhD in Entrepreneurship Education at Queen's University Belfast in 2000. In 2023, Henry was awarded a MA in Creative Writing from Queens University Belfast.

== Career and research ==
Henry is currently the Head of Department of Business Studies at Dundalk Institute of Technology, and an adjunct professor of Business Strategy and Innovation at Griffith University, Queensland, Australia. In 2017, Henry was awarded the Sten K. Johnson European Entrepreneurship Education Award (EEEA). The award is presented annually by the Sten K. Johnson Centre for Entrepreneurship, Lund University School of Economics and Management, Sweden, recognising an individual who has contributed to the improvement of entrepreneurship education in academia in Europe. Henry was the first Irish recipient of the award. In April 2018, she was conferred as a Fellow of the Academy of Social Sciences.

She was previously an adjunct professor of Entrepreneurship at UiT The Arctic University of Norway, the Norbrook Professor of Business and Enterprise at the Royal Veterinary College London, and President of the Institute for Small Business & Entrepreneurship, UK.

Henry is the founding editor of The International Journal of Gender and Entrepreneurship (IJGE), which published its first issue in 2009 and was developed at Diana International Conferences held by The Diana Project, an organization founded in 1999 by a group of scholars focused on collaborative research related to women's entrepreneurship. Henry was also the Founder and Chair of Global WEP, Women's Entrepreneurship Policy Research.

== Honours and awards ==
- Co-leader, 7th Diana International Conference, 2014
- European Entrepreneurship Education Award (EEEA) from the Sten K. Johnson Centre for Entrepreneurship at Lund University, 2017
- Fellow of the Academy of Social Sciences, 2018

== Selected publications ==
- Henry, Colette, ed. (2007). Entrepreneurship in the Creative Industries: An International Perspective. Cheltenham, UK: Edward Elgar Publishing. ISBN 9781845426101.
- Henry, Colette; McElwee, Gerard, eds. (2014). Exploring Rural Enterprise: New perspectives on research, policy & practice (First ed.). Bingley: Emerald Publishing. ISBN 9781784411121.
- Henry, C. (2021). "Entrepreneurship Policies through a Gender Lens | en | OECD". www.oecd.org.
- Henry, Colette (2021). "Is there a Role for Entrepreneurship Education in Veterinary Medicine? A UK Study". Entrepreneurship Education and Pedagogy. 6 (1): 161–186. doi:10.1177/25151274211040423. hdl:10072/428829. ISSN 2515-1274. S2CID 239690256.
- Henry, Colette; Coleman, Susan; Orser, Barbara; Foss, Lene (2022-07-01). "Women's Entrepreneurship Policy and Access to Financial Capital in Different Countries: An Institutional Perspective". Entrepreneurship Research Journal. 12 (3): 227–262. doi:10.1515/erj-2022-0234. hdl:10072/421296. ISSN 2157-5665. S2CID 250472885.
- Henry, C.; Coleman, S.; Lewis, V. (2023-01-17). Women's Entrepreneurship Policy: A Global Perspective. Edward Elgar Publishing. ISBN 978-1-80037-465-2.
