= Mary Daly (sociologist) =

Irish sociologist and academic

Mary Daly, MRIA, FBA, FAcSS is an Irish sociologist and academic. Since 2012, she has been Professor of Sociology and Social Policy at the University of Oxford and a Fellow of Green Templeton College, Oxford. She previously researched and/or taught at the University of Limerick, the Institute of Public Administration, University College Dublin, the European University Institute, the Institute of Social Policy, University of Göttingen, and at Queen's University Belfast.

== Honours ==
In 2010, Daly was elected a member of the Royal Irish Academy (MRIA), the all-Ireland's academy for the sciences and humanities. In 2016, she was elected a Fellow of the Academy of Social Sciences (FAcSS). In July 2017, she was elected a Fellow of the British Academy (FBA), the United Kingdom's national academy for the humanities and social sciences.

== Selected works ==
- Daly, Mary; Rake, Katherine (2003). Gender and the Welfare State: Care, Work and Welfare in Europe and the USA. Cambridge: Polity Press. ISBN 978-0745622316.
- Daly, Mary (2011). Welfare. Cambridge: Polity Press. ISBN 978-0745644707.
- Daly, Mary; Kelly, Grace (2015). Families and Poverty: Everyday Life on a Low Income. Bristol: Policy Press. ISBN 978-1447318828.
