= Karen Guldberg =

British educational theorist

Professor Karen Guldberg FAcSS
- Known for: Autism education, inclusive pedagogies, practitioner training and policy development
- Awards: Fellow of the Academy of Social Sciences (2024)

Academic background
- Education: University of Manchester; University of Birmingham

Karen Guldberg FAcSS is a British academic specialising in autism studies and inclusive education. She is Professor of Autism Studies and Head of the School of Education at the University of Birmingham, where she previously served as director of the Autism Centre for Education and Research (ACER).

== Academic career ==
Guldberg began her career as a teacher, working at New Fosseway School in Bristol from 1995 to 2000, and later for the Bristol Special Needs Autism Outreach service. She joined the University of Birmingham in 2001 as a lecturer and was appointed professor in 2018. She has served as Head of the Department of Disability, Inclusion and Special Needs and is currently Head of the School of Education.

From December 2024 to July 2025, she chaired the Department for Education’s Neurodivergence Task and Finish Group, whose recommendations informed the Schools White Paper. Since August 2025, she has served as a member of the Department for Education's Expert Advisory Group for Inclusion and the Scientific Advisory Council.

In 2024, Guldberg was elected a Fellow of the Academy of Social Sciences. She was named the British Educational Research Association (BERA) Academic Citizen of the Year for 2025.

== Research ==
Guldberg's research focuses on autism education, inclusive practice, pedagogy, and technology-enhanced learning. She has been principal investigator or co-investigator on more than 30 research and knowledge exchange projects funded by organisations including the Economic and Social Research Council (ESRC), the Engineering and Physical Sciences Research Council (EPSRC), the European Union, the Autism Education Trust (AET), and the John and Lorna Wing Foundation. Her work has included contributions to the Research Excellence Framework (REF) impact case studies in 2014 and 2021.
