= Emily Grundy =

British demographer and academic

Emily Marjata Dorothea Grundy, FBA, FAcSS (born 24 July 1955) is a British demographer and academic, specialising in ageing and health inequalities. Since 2013, she has been Professor of Demography at the London School of Economics and Political Science (LSE). She was previously Professor of Demographic Gerontology at the London School of Hygiene and Tropical Medicine (LSHTM) from 2003 to 2012, and Professor of Demography at the University of Cambridge from 2012 to 2013. From October 2017, she will be Professor of Population Science and Director of the Institute for Social and Economic Research at the University of Essex.

== Honours ==
In October 2016, Grundy was elected Fellow of the Academy of Social Sciences (FAcSS). In July 2017, she was elected a Fellow of the British Academy (FBA), the United Kingdom's national academy for the humanities and social sciences.

== Selected works ==
- Emily M. D. Grundy (1989). Longitudinal study: women's migration: marriage, fertility, and divorce. Her Majesty's Stationery Office. ISBN 978-0-11-691240-4.
- Ann Bowling; Emily M. D. Grundy; Morag Farquhar (1997). Living Well Into Old Age: Three Studies of Health and Well-being Among Older People in East London and Essex. Age Concern England. ISBN 978-0-86242-243-1.
- Alan D. Dangour; Emily M. D. Grundy; Astrid E. Fletcher, eds. (2007). Ageing Well: Nutrition, Health, and Social Interventions. CRC Press. ISBN 978-1-4200-0756-5.
