= Clare Bambra =

Social scientist

Clare Bambra FMedSci FAcSS
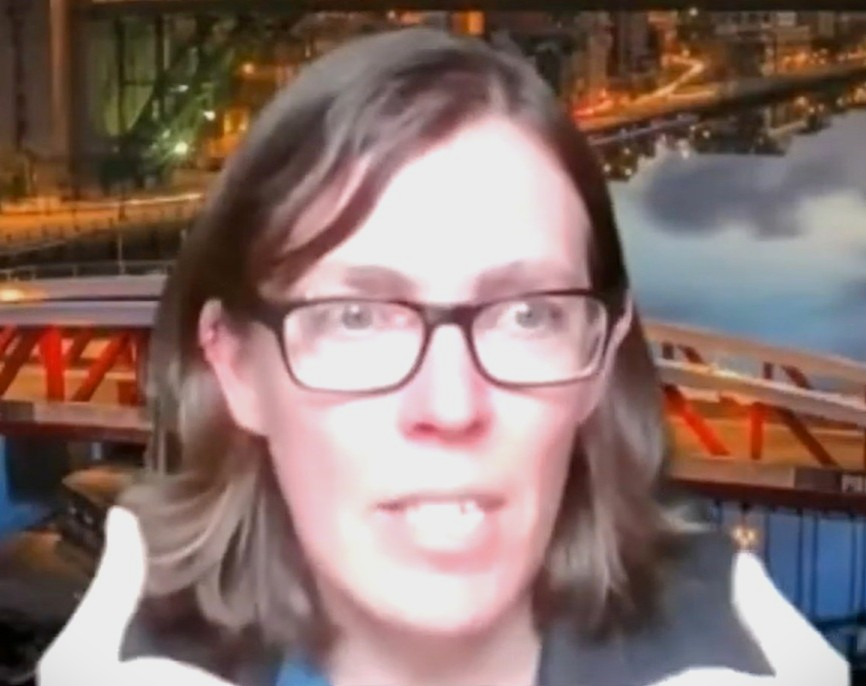
- Bambra in 2022
- Education: University of Birmingham; University of Manchester
- Scientific career
- Workplaces: Newcastle University; Durham University; University of Liverpool; Sheffield Hallam University
- Thesis: One world? An examination of the convergence of European welfare states (2002)

Clare Bambra is a British social scientist who is Professor of Public Health at Newcastle University. She is the Founding Director of Health Equity North, and has led the Wellcome Trust investigation into the north-south health divide. Bambra is a member of the World Health Organization Europe's Scientific Advisory Group on Health Equity.

== Early life and education ==
Bambra studied political sciences at the University of Birmingham. She moved to the University of Manchester for her postgraduate degree, where she specialised in European politics and policy. She stayed in Manchester for her doctoral research, where she studied convergence of European welfare states. After completing her PhD she moved to the University of Liverpool, where she worked as a research associate in public health policy.

== Research and career ==
Bambra is a social scientist who works on public health and social epidemiology. She is particularly concerned about low life expectancy in North East England. For example, men in the city centre of Stockton-on-Tees die 15 years before those in the suburbs. She founded Health Equity North, a research programme that looks to reduce health inequalities in the North of England.

Bambra has studied how health inequalities will evolve in the future, and what needs to be done to reduce health inequalities. She has argued that the socioeconomic inequalities generated by work (and no work) are determinants of population health. Bambra is involved with the Centre for Global Health Inequalities Research, CHAIN.

Bambra has appeared on BBC Radio 4's Thinking Allowed, where she discussed health inequalities and how to eradicate them. She provided expert evidence to the UK COVID-19 Inquiry. She discussed health inequalities during the pandemic, how government understanding of health inequalities evolved over the pandemic and whether the devolved administrations addressed health inequalities equally. Bambra explained that the pandemic disproportionately impacted the most deprived places in the UK, and that the north of England had twice as many vape shops as the south.

In 2024. Bambra was elected to the German National Academy of Sciences Leopoldina. She was elected to the Academy of Medical Sciences in 2025.

== Selected publications ==
- Clare Bambra; Ryan Riordan; John Ford; Fiona Matthews (13 June 2020). "The COVID-19 pandemic and health inequalities". Journal of Epidemiology and Community Health. doi:10.1136/jech-2020-214401. ISSN 0143-005X. PMC 7298201. PMID 32535550. Wikidata Q96340347.
- C Bambra; M Gibson; A Sowden; K Wright; M Whitehead; M Petticrew (19 August 2009). "Tackling the wider social determinants of health and health inequalities: evidence from systematic reviews". Journal of Epidemiology and Community Health. 64 (4): 284–291. doi:10.1136/jech.2008.082743. ISSN 0143-005X. PMC 2921286. PMID 19692738. Wikidata Q37582713.
- Clare Bambra; Terje A Eikemo (17 October 2008). "Welfare state regimes, unemployment and health: a comparative study of the relationship between unemployment and self-reported health in 23 European countries". Journal of Epidemiology and Community Health. 63 (2): 92–98. doi:10.1136/jech.2008.077354. ISSN 0143-005X. PMID 18930981. Wikidata Q50119523.
