= Yvette Taylor =

British sociologist and academic

Yvette Taylor FRSE FAcSS

Academic background
- Education: University of York (PhD, MA); University of Edinburgh (MA)
- Thesis: Working-class lesbians: classed in a classless climate (2004)

Academic work
- Discipline: Sociologist
- Institutions: University of Strathclyde; London South Bank University; Newcastle University

Yvette Taylor is a British sociologist, academic and author. She is currently the professor of education at the University of Strathclyde, and she was awarded a Fellowship of the Royal Society of Edinburgh in 2026.

== Education ==
In 1996, Taylor enrolled at the University of Edinburgh, and studied politics with gender studies. In 2000, she graduated with a Master of Arts.

In 2000, Taylor studied at the University of York. In 2001, she obtained a Master of Arts in women's studies. Funded by the Economic and Social Research Council (ESRC), her thesis was titled Working-class lesbians: classed in a classless climate. In 2004, she was conferred a Doctor of Philosophy.

In 2008, Taylor obtained a Postgraduate Certificate in Academic Practice from Newcastle University.

== Career ==
In 2005, Taylor joined Newcastle University as a lecturer in the School of Geography. In 2011, she joined the London South Bank University as a professor in social and policy studies. In 2013, she received a mid-career fellowship from the British Academy. In 2015, Taylor was appointed professor of education at the University of Strathclyde.

Taylor was elected a Fellow of the Academy of Social Sciences in 2020, and Fellow of the Royal Society of Edinburgh in 2026, in the discipline of economics and social sciences.

== Research ==
Taylor's research is on LGBTQ people, class inequality, social justice, and education. In recognition of her research, Taylor was awarded a person research fellowship by the Royal Society of Edinburgh. To date, Taylor has authored or co-authored more than 100 publications.

== Selected publications ==
=== Books ===
- Taylor, Yvette (1 January 2007). Working-Class Lesbian Life: Classed Outsiders. Women's Studies at York Series. London: Palgrave Macmillan. doi:10.1057/9780230592384. eISSN 2947-051X. ISBN 9781349284252. ISSN 2947-0501. OCLC 77716953.
- Taylor, Yvette (30 July 2009). Lesbian and Gay Parenting: Securing Social and Educational Capital. New York: Palgrave Macmillan. doi:10.1057/9780230244542. ISBN 9780230244542. OCLC 1113284633.
- Taylor, Yvette (24 March 2016) [17 December 2015]. Making Space for Queer-Identifying Religious Youth. Palgrave pivot. Basingstoke, Hampshire: Palgrave Macmillan. doi:10.1057/9781137502599. ISBN 9781137502575.
- Taylor, Yvette (15 April 2016) [13 March 2012]. Fitting into Place?: Class and Gender Geographies and Temporalities. New York: Routledge. doi:10.4324/9781315582481. ISBN 9781315582481. OCLC 1306554916.
- Taylor, Yvette, ed. (26 February 2026). Queer in a Wee Place: Small Nations, Sexuality and Scotland. London: Bloomsbury Publishing. doi:10.5040/9781350513068. ISBN 9781350513068. OCLC 1614424674.

=== Journals ===
- Taylor, Yvette (26 February 2007). "'If Your Face Doesn't Fit…': The Misrecognition of Working‐Class Lesbians in Scene Space". Leisure Studies. 26 (2): 161–178. doi:10.1080/02614360600661211. eISSN 1466-4496. ISSN 0261-4367.
- Taylor, Yvette (1 October 2008). "'That's Not Really My Scene': Working-Class Lesbians In (and Out of) Place". Sexualities. 11 (5): 523–546. doi:10.1177/1363460708094266. eISSN 1461-7382. ISSN 1363-4607. OCLC 474576878.
- Taylor, Yvette (13 April 2009). "Complexities and Complications: Intersections of Class and Sexuality". Journal of Lesbian Studies. 13 (2): 189–203. doi:10.1080/10894160802695361. eISSN 1540-3548. ISSN 1089-4160. CODEN 97660031.
- Taylor, Yvette; Falconer, Emily; Snowdon, Ria (24 July 2014). "Queer youth, Facebook and faith: Facebook methodologies and online identities". New Media & Society. 16 (7): 1138–1153. doi:10.1177/1461444814544000. eISSN 1461-7315. ISSN 1461-4448. LCCN 00212321. OCLC 41428149.
