= Diamond Ashiagbor =

British professor of Law and author

- Education: University of Oxford; European University Institute
- Occupations: Professor of Law and author

Diamond Ashiagbor is a British legal scholar and solicitor. Since 2025, she has been Professor of Law at the University of Birmingham. She previously taught at Kent Law School, University of Kent and is the author of several books.

== Early life and education ==
Ashiagbor earned her BA and MA at University of Oxford and her PhD at the European University Institute in Florence, Italy. She went on to receive a Postgraduate Diploma in Learning & Teaching in Higher Education at Oxford.

== Career ==
She has served as Professor of Law and Director of Research at the Institute of Advanced Legal Studies at the University of London and also Professor of Labour Law at SOAS University of London. She has held several visiting positions at Columbia Law School, Melbourne Law School, and Osgoode Hall.

In November 2024, she was named the 125th Anniversary Chair and Professor of Law at Birmingham Law School, University of Birmingham, UK. She took up the appointment in May 2025.

== Honours ==
In October 2020, she was elected a Fellow of the Academy of Social Sciences (FAcSS).

== Selected works ==
- Ashiagbor, Diamond (2019-07-25). Re-Imagining Labour Law for Development, ISBN 9781509913152
- Theorizing the Relationship Between Social Law and Markets in Regional Integration Projects
- The European Employment Strategy: Labour Market Regulation and New Governance
- (2019) “Introduction: Narratives of informality and development”, in Ashiagbor, D. (ed.) Re-Imagining Labour Law for Development: Informal Work in the Global North and South. Oxford, UK: Hart Publishing, pp. 1–18
- (2016) “Religion and equality in multicultural workplaces: human rights and anti-discrimination discourses in EU law”, in Bogg, A., Costello, C., and Davies, A. (eds.) Research Handbook on EU Labour Law. Edward Elgar, pp. 422–444
- (2015) “Evaluating the Reflexive Turn in Labour Law”, in Bogg, A., Costello, C., Davies, A., and Adams-Prassl, J. (eds.) The Autonomy of Labour Law. Oxford: Hart Publishing, pp. 123–148
- (2014) “Article 15: Freedom to choose an occupation and right to engage in work, and Article 29: Right of access to placement services”, in Peers, S., Hervey, T., Kenner, J., and Ward, A. (eds.) The EU Charter of Fundamental Rights: A Commentary. Hart Publishing
- (2013) “The Global Financial Crisis: Impact on Labour and Employment Law”, in D Maynard, P. and Gold, N. (eds.) Poverty, Justice and the Rule of Law: Report of the Second Phase of the IBA (International Bar Association) Presidential Task Force on the Financial Crisis. International Bar Association 2013
- (2006) “L’armonizzazione soft: il ‘Metodo aperto di coordinamento’ nella Strategia europea per occupazione”, in Barbera, M. (ed.) Nuove forme di regolazione: Il metodo aperto di coordinamento delle politiche sociali. Giuffrè Editore, pp. 99–138
