= Svenja Adolphs =

British linguist

Svenja Adolphs is a British linguist whose research involves analysis of corpus data including sources of multimodal material such as the Nottingham Multimodal Corpus (NMMC) to examine communication in new forms of digital records. Using visual mark-up systems, her work allows a better understanding of the nature of natural language use. She is a co-founder (along with Paul Crawford and Ronald Carter) of the Health Language Research Group at the University of Nottingham, bringing together academics and clinicians to advance the work of applied linguistics in health care settings.

== Biography ==
Adolphs earned her PhD in 2001 from the University of Nottingham. She is currently professor of English language and linguistics at Nottingham and head of the School of English. At Nottingham she has served as director of research (associate pro-vice chancellor) of the Faculty of Arts, head of English Language and Applied Linguistics, chair of the Faculty of Arts Impact Strategy Group and chair of the Creative Industries Task Force.

From 2004 to 2007, she was a member of the executive committee of the British Association for Applied Linguistics, and represented BAAL in the Network of European Applied Linguists and the International Association for Applied Linguistics.

Adolphs is principal investigator on a grant from the Economic and Social Research Council (ESRC) that looked at adolescent language use in discussing health issues in the online forums of the Teenage Health Freak website. She is also principal investigator on an Engineering and Physical Sciences Research Council (EPSRC) investigating second language speech fluency.

She is the member of a number of academic journal editorial boards, including those for Corpora, The International Journal of Corpus Linguistics, and the ELR Journal.

From 2014 to 2018 Adolphs was a member of council, the Arts and Humanities Research Council (AHRC), governing body responsible for the overall strategic direction of the AHRC, including its key objectives and targets. This is a position which was appointed by the Minister for Universities and Science. She is also a member of the Strategic Advisory Network of the ESRC.

On 12 October 2017 she became a Fellow of the Academy of Social Sciences.

== Selected publications ==
- S. Adolphs and R. Carter. 2013. Spoken corpus linguistics: from monomodal to multimodal. Routledge.
- S. Adolphs. 2008. Corpus and context: Investigating pragmatic functions in spoken discourse. John Benjamins.
- S Adolphs. 2006. Introducing electronic text analysis: A practical guide for language and literary studies. Routledge.
- S. Adolphs, B. Brown, R. Carter, P. Crawford, and O. Sahota. 2004. "Applying corpus linguistics in a health care context," Journal of Applied Linguistics and Professional Practice.
- N. Schmitt, Z. Dornyei, S. Adolphs, and V. Durow. 2004. "Knowledge and acquisition of formulaic sequences," Formulaic Sequences: Acquisition, Processing, and Use. John Benjamins.
- S. Adolphs and N. Schmitt. 2003. "Lexical coverage of spoken discourse," Applied Linguistics.
