= Charles Musselwhite =

British applied psychologist

Charles Musselwhite FAcSS
- Born: 16 June 1975 (age 51)
- Education: Transportation Research Group at University of Southampton (PhD)
- Years active: 1998 – present
- Known for: Environmental and Community Psychology
- Awards: CT Ally of the Year (2026)

Charles Brian Alexander Musselwhite (born 16 June 1975) is Professor and Head of Psychology at Aberystwyth University.

He was born in Portsmouth, Hampshire, United Kingdom and educated at Bay House School, Gosport, Hampshire, followed by St Vincent Sixth Form College, Gosport, Hampshire. He went on to read Psychology at University of Southampton (BSc, Psychology, 1998) before completing a PhD in the Transportation Research Group, University of Southampton (PhD, 2004) examining attitudes to car driver behaviour.

He was a lecturer of traffic and transport psychology at the Centre for Transport & Society at University West of England from 2006 to 2013, and associate professor in gerontology at the Centre for Innovative Ageing, Swansea University, between 2013 and 2021. He is the Editor in Chief of the Journal of Transport and Health. His research focuses on environmental gerontology, environment and health in later stages of life, giving-up driving, age friendly neighbourhoods and communities, and social aspects of transport and mobility. In September 2024 he became a Fellow of the Academy of Social Sciences (FAcSS).

== Notable works ==
His most cited work is the development of a hierarchy of travel and mobility needs for older people. The model suggests people travel for three main purposes: getting from A to B as cheaply and reliably as possible; for independence, freedom, status and to satisfy roles and; aesthetic needs, for the journey itself, to feel and experience mobility, to visit or immerse oneself in beautiful surroundings, or to observe others' mobility or to imagine and think about previous or future mobility. He concludes that mobility provision currently does not meet the needs of older people because too much emphasis is placed on practical reasons for travel at the expense of psychosocial or aesthetic motivations.

He has also co-designed a model of mobility based on Bourdieu's theory of capital. The model suggests older people trade off different types of capital in 4 main areas in order to be mobile:

- Infrastructure capital (technology, services, roads, pavements, finance and economics).
- Social capital (friends, family, neighbourhood and community).
- Sultural capital (norms, expectations, rules, laws).
- Individual capital (skills, abilities, resilience, adaptation and desire and willingness to change).

He concludes that infrastructure capital is most important but low levels of such capital can be overcome by social capital, while cultural capital and individual capital are harder to change but still important in achieving mobility.

He has co-edited books on mobile e-health, transport and travel in later life, physical activity in later life and geographies of transport in later life. In 2021 he published Designing Public Space for an Ageing Population which examines how public spaces can be designed to help elderly people stay mobile especially as pedestrians.

== Awards ==
In 2026 he won the 2026 CT Ally of the Year, this award was for "exceptional contribution to Community Transport".
