= Ivan Eisler =

British psychologist

- Education: New College, Oxford (B.A, M.A. 1971); King's College London (Ph.D 1993)
- Known for: Works in field of family therapy
- Awards: FAcSS, OBE
- Scientific career
- Fields: family psychology
- Institutions: King's College London
- Thesis: Family Interaction: Bridging Clinical and Research Perspectives (1991)
- Doctoral students: Mohammad Ali Besharat

Ivan Eisler OBE FAcSS is a British psychologist and Professor in the Institute of Psychiatry at King's College London. Eisler is a fellow of the Academy of Social Sciences, and was a recipient of 2016 Birthday Honours for his services to family therapy.
