= Deborah Oxley =

Social historian

Deborah Oxley FRHistS, FAcSS
- Born: 30 October 1963 (age 62)
- Awards: Fellow of the Academy of Social Sciences (2015)

Academic background
- Education: University of New South Wales (BA, MA, PhD)
- Thesis: Convict Maids (1991)
- Doctoral advisor: Barrie Oyster

Academic work
- Discipline: History
- Sub-discipline: Gender history Labour history Economic history
- Institutions: University of Oxford (2007–); University of New South Wales (1994–2007); University of Melbourne (1990–93)
- Notable works: Convict Maids (1996)

Deborah Oxley, FRHistS, FAcSS (born 30 October 1963) is a professor of Social Science History at the University of Oxford. Oxley's research focuses on the study of Australian convicts (including gender studies, comparative coercive labour systems, labour markets, colonial economic development, and migration).

== Education ==
Oxley completed her undergraduate and postgraduate degrees at the University of New South Wales, from 1982 to 1989.

== Career ==
Oxley was appointed as a lecturer in economic history at the University of Melbourne in 1990. In 1994 she joined the University of New South Wales, where she held the VCs Postdoctoral Research Fellowship in economics from 1994 to 1996, an ARC Research Fellowship in Economic History from 1997 to 2000, and an ARC Senior Research Fellow in economic history (2000–01). She held the position of lecturer then senior lecturer in social science and policy (2002–05) and adjunct associate professor in economics from 1994 to 2007.

In 2013, Oxley presented the Economic History Society Tawney Lecture on Anthropometrics, Gender & Health Inequality in History. In 2014–17, Oxley received a Leverhulme Major Research Fellow award, working on 'Weighty Matters: Anthropometrics, gender and health inequality in Britain's past'.

Oxley was appointed as a Fellow of the Academy of Social Sciences in 2015.

== Selected publications ==
D. Oxley. 1996. Convict Maids: The Forced Migration of Women to Australia. Cambridge: CUP.

Meredith and Oxley, 2014. Food and fodder: Feeding Britain, 1700–1900. Past and Present 222.1.
