= Julia Brannen =

British sociologist

Academic work
- Main interests: Sociology
- Website: Institute of Education, University of London

Julia Brannen, FRSA, FAcSS, is professor of the sociology of the family at the Institute of Education, University of London. She has an international reputation for her research on family life, work-life issues, and intergenerational relations.

She is seen as a pioneer of mixed method research and an issue of the journal International Journal of Social Research Methodology was dedicated to a celebration of her contribution to the field. Her 2016 book was praised for the strength of the study's mixed methodology.

She is a Fellow of the Academy of Social Sciences and a visiting professor at the University of Bergen in Norway.

== Selected bibliography ==
- Brannen, Julia; Moss, Peter (1988). New mothers at work: employment and childcare. London: Unwin. ISBN 9780046120481.
- Brannen, Julia; Moss, Peter (1991). Managing mothers: dual earner households after maternity leave. London Boston: Unwin Hyman. ISBN 9780044458982.
- Brannen, Julia; Moss, Peter (2003). Rethinking children's care. Buckingham Philadelphia: Open University. ISBN 9780335209873.
- Brannen, Julia; Alasuutari, Pertti; Bickman, Leonard (2008). The SAGE handbook of social research methods. Los Angeles, California London: SAGE. ISBN 9781848607309.
- O'Connell, R; Brannen, Julia (2016). Food, Families and Work. London: Bloomsbury Publishing. ISBN 9780857857507.
