= Vera Tolz =

British Russian scholar

Vera Tolz-Zilitinkevic FAcSS is the Sir William Mather Professor of Russian Studies at the University of Manchester.

She received an MA in Classics from Saint Petersburg State University in 1981 and a PhD in Russian and East European Studies from the University of Birmingham in 1993.

She was elected Fellow of the Academy of Social Sciences in 2017.

Tolz's research focuses on nationalism, ethnic politics, and the relationship between imperial and national conceptions of collective identity in modern and contemporary Russia. Her work examines how intellectual and political elites have constructed competing definitions of Russian nationhood over the past three centuries, with particular attention to the relationship between discursive constructions of identity and politics. Her publications in this area include the monograph Russia: Inventing the Nation (2001) and two co-edited volumes, Nation and Gender in Contemporary Europe (2005) and Nation and Empire at War (2015).

Her earlier work examined the relationship between academics, scholarship, and political power in late imperial Russia and in the Soviet Union between the 1920s and 1940s. This research resulted in the monographs Russian Academicians and the Revolution (1997) and 'Russia's Own Orient': The Politics of Identity and Oriental Studies in the Late Imperial and Early Soviet Periods (2011).

Since 2010, Tolz's research has centred on how Russian state media use identity-related discourses to legitimise the country's domestic and foreign policies. She co-authored Nation, Ethnicity and Race on Russian Television (2015) with Stephen Hutchings, and Russia, Disinformation, and the Liberal Order (2024) with Hutchings and others. Tolz has also extensively written on the subject of Gazetovedenie which is the study of the press in the early Soviet Union. This discipline, founded in Germany as Zeitungswissenschaft, focused on issues such as the effect of propaganda and of communication on society. It is viewed by some as the origin of Journalism theory.

== Books ==
- Russia: Inventing the Nation (2001)
- Nation and Gender in Contemporary Europe (2005) co-editor
- Nation and Empire at War (2015) co-editor
- with Stephen Hutchings, Nation, Ethnicity and Race on Russian Television (2015)
- Russia's Own Orient: The Politics of Identity and Oriental Studies in the Late Imperial and Early Soviet Periods (2011)
- Russian Academicians and the Revolution (1997)
