= Nina Laurie =

British geographer

Nina Laurie FRSE

Academic background
- Education: Newcastle University; McGill University
- Alma mater: University College London
- Thesis: Negotiating gender: women and emergency employment in Peru (1995)

Academic work
- Discipline: Geography
- Institutions: University of St Andrews

Nina Laurie FRSE is a British geographer and academic. Since 2016, she has been Professor of Geography and Development at the University of St Andrews.

== Career ==
Laurie graduated from Newcastle University with a BA and from McGill University in Canada with an MA before she carried out doctoral studies at University College London; her PhD was awarded in 1995 for her thesis "Negotiating gender: women and emergency employment in Peru". She joined the faculty at Newcastle University in 1992 as a lecturer and in 2002 was promoted to a senior lectureship. She was appointed Professor of Development and the Environment in 2005. In 2016, she left Newcastle to join the University of St Andrews as Professor of Geography and Development. Since 2017, she has also been an editor of Progress in Human Geography. Laurie was elected a Fellow of the Royal Society of Edinburgh in March 2021.

She was awarded the Busk Medal by the Royal Geographical Society in 2020.

== Publications ==
- (Co-authored with Robert Andolina and Sarah A. Radcliffe) Indigenous Development in the Andes: Culture, Power, and Transnationalism (Duke University Press, 2009).
- (Edited with Liz Bondi) Working the Spaces of Neoliberalism: Activism, Professionalisation and Incorporation (John Wiley and Sons, 2012).
- (Co-authored with Claire Dwyer, Sarah L. Holloway and Fiona M. Smith) Geographies of New Femininities (Routledge, 1999).
