= James Nazroo =

James Nazroo, PhD, MBBS FBA FaCSS, is Professor of Sociology at the University of Manchester. He is the founding and deputy director of the ESRC Centre of Dynamics of Ethnicity (CoDE), co-Principal Investigator (PI) of the Synergi Collaborative Centre, which is investigating ethnic inequalities in severe mental illness, and founding and co-director of the Manchester Institute for Collaborative Research on Ageing (MICRA).

== Research Areas ==
Issues of inequality, social justice and underlying processes of stratification have been the primary focus of his research activities, centering on ethnicity/race, ageing, gender, and the interrelationships between these. His work focuses on ethnicity/race and developing an understanding of the links between ethnicity, racism, class and inequality. This included focus on social disadvantage, how these relate to racialized identities and processes of racism, and how these patterns have changed over time.

He has also researches access to and quality of health services, including mental health services. His research on ageing has been concerned to understand the patterns and determinants of social and health inequalities in ageing populations. He has conducted studies on quality of life for older people among different ethnic groups in the UK, on inequalities in health at older ages, and on routes into retirement and the impact of retirement on health and well-being. He was PI of the fRaill programme, an interdisciplinary study of inequalities in later life, and is co-PI of the English Longitudinal Study of Aging (ELSA) which is a multi-disciplinary panel study of those aged 50 and older.

== Honours ==
In March 2015, Nazroo was elected a Fellow of the Academy of Social Sciences (FAcSS).

In 2020 Nazroo was elected a Fellow of the British Academy.
