= John Richard Eiser =

British social psychologist (born 1945)

- Born: John Richard Eiser; 1945 (age 80–81)

Academic background
- Education: University of Oxford; London School of Economics
- Thesis: Context effects in absolute judgement : adaptation or concept attainment? (1969)

Academic work
- Discipline: Social psychology
- Sub-discipline: attitudes
- Institutions: University of Bristol; Institute of Psychiatry; University of Exeter; University of Sheffield

John Richard Eiser (born 1945) is a British social psychologist with particular expertise in attitude theory and in the applications of psychology to understanding health and risk practices.

== Academic career ==
Eiser began his career at the University of Oxford where he obtained a BA in psychology in 1966. He was strongly influenced by Henri Tajfel who was working there at that time. He proceeded to the London School of Economics where he completed his PhD which led to his first book authored with his fellow student Wolfgang Stroebe.

He then obtained a post at the University of Bristol where he had the opportunity of further working with Tajfel who was editing the series European Monographs in Social Psychology. Eiser and Stroebe’s book was the third monograph in this series. Eiser subsequently became executive editor of the series.

Eiser then returned to London where he obtained a research post at the Addiction Research Unit at the Institute of Psychiatry. Here he worked with Martin Jarvis, Michael Russell Martin Raw, Stephen Sutton and others on the psychology of smoking and drug use. He began to expand his reputation in the emerging field of health psychology. He helped organise a conference on the subject with the Welsh Branch of the British Psychological Society.

He was then appointed Professor of Psychology at the University of Exeter with the remit to expand research in this area. He remained at Exeter for ten years and then moved to the University of Sheffield as head of the Department of Psychology. He remained there until his retirement in 2006.

== Research ==
Eiser’s research was both fundamental and applied. He had a strong interest in issues of categorization, stereotyping and social conflict which he related to the concept of attitudes (Eiser & Stroebe, 1972).

He was one of the early social/health psychologists. His work on smoking and addiction continues to be influential.

He then went on to conduct a programme of research on perceptions of risk, in particular toward nuclear hazards but also health and other issues.

== Awards ==
- Fellow of the Academy of Social Sciences

== Key publications ==
=== Books ===
- Nuclear neighbourhoods : community responses to reactor siting (University of Exeter) (1995) (with Spears and van der Joop)
- Attitudes, Chaos and the Connectionist Mind (Wiley-Blackwell). (1993)
- Social Judgement (Open University) (1990)
- Attitudes and Decisions (Routledge) (1988) (with van der Joop)
- Social psychology: Attitudes, cognition and social behaviour Cambridge: Cambridge University Press (1986).
- Attitudinal Judgement (Springer) (1984)
- Social Psychology and Behavioural Medicine (Wiley) (1982)
- Research in psychology and medicine. Volume I, Physical aspects : pain, stress, diagnosis and organic damage. International Conference on Psychology and Medicine (1979 ; Swansea) / Academic Press / 1979 ed. by D.J. Oborne, M.M. Gruneberg, J.R. Eiser
- Research in psychology and medicine. Volume II, Social aspects, attitudes, communication, care and training. International Conference on Psychology and Medicine (1979 ; Swansea) / Academic Press / 1979 edited by D. J. Oborne, M. M. Gruneberg, J. R. Eiser
- Categorization and social judgement (with W. Stroebe) London: Academic Press. (1972)

=== Journal articles ===
- Eiser, J.R., Bostrom, A., Burton, I., Johnston, D.M., McClure, J., Paton, D., van der Pligt, J., & White, M.P. (2012). Risk interpretation and action: A conceptual framework for responses to natural hazards. International Journal of Disaster Risk Reduction, 1, 5-16.
- White M.P., & Eiser J.R. (2006). Marginal trust in risk managers: building and losing trust following decisions under uncertainty. Risk Analysis, 26(5), 1187-203.
- White, M.P., Eiser, J.R., Harris, P.R. (2004). Risk perceptions of mobile phone use while driving. Risk Analysis, 24(2), 323-34.
- Eiser, J. R., Fazio, R. H., Stafford, T., & Prescott, T. J. (2003). Connectionist Simulation of Attitude Learning: Asymmetries in the Acquisition of Positive and Negative Evaluations. Personality and Social Psychology Bulletin, 29(10), 1221-1235.
- Eiser, J. R., & Ford, N. (1995). Sexual Relationships on Holiday: A Case of Situational Disinhibition? Journal of Social and Personal Relationships, 12(3), 323-339.
- Eiser J.R., Morgan M., Gammage, P., Brooks, N., & Kirby R. (1991). Adolescent health behaviour and similarity-attraction: friends share smoking habits (really), but much else besides. British Journal of Social Psychology, 30 (4), 339-48.
- Eiser, J.R., Morgan, M., Gammage, P. and Gray, E. (1989), Adolescent smoking: Attitudes, norms and parental influence. British Journal of Social Psychology, 28: 193-202.
- Van der Pligt, J., Eiser, J. R., & Spears, R. (1987). Comparative judgements and preferences: The influence of the number of response alternatives. British Journal of Social Psychology, 26(4), 269–28.
- Eiser, C., Walsh, S., & Eiser, J.R. (1986). Young children’s understanding of smoking. Addictive Behaviors, 11(2), 119-123.
- Eiser, J.R., & van der Pligt, J. (1984) Accentuation theory, polarization and the judgment of attitude statements. In JR Eiser (ed.) Attitudinal Judgement pp. 43–63. New York: Springer-Verlag.
- Litman, G.K., Eiser, J.R., Rawson, N.S.B., & Oppenheim, A.N. (1979). Differences in relapse precipitants and coping behaviour between alcohol relapsers and survivors,. Behaviour Research and Therapy,17 (2), 89-94.
- Litman, G.K., Eiser, J.R., Rawson, N.S., & Oppenheim, A.N. (1977). Towards a typology of relapse: a preliminary report. Drug and Alcohol Dependency, 2(3), 157-62.
