= Stephen D. King =

British economist

Stephen Daryl King (born November 1963) is a British economist. He is senior economic adviser at HSBC Holdings, where he was chief economist from 1998 to July 2015. King also works as a journalist and consultant, and was a specialist adviser to the House of Commons Treasury Committee between 2015 and 2017.

He is author of Losing Control: The Emerging Threats to Western Prosperity (2010), When the Money Runs Out: The End of Western Affluence (2013), Grave New World: The End of Globalization, the Return of History (2017) and We Need to Talk About Inflation: 14 Urgent Lessons from the Last 2,000 Years (2023).

King identifies as a "Jew through choice", converting to Judaism in 1991. He has described experiencing antisemitism since his conversion and believes that antisemitism has become worse over time.

King's career began at HM Treasury. He read Philosophy, Politics and Economics at New College, Oxford.
