= Charles Baden-Fuller =

American academic

Charles Baden-Fuller, FBA
- Education: University of Oxford, Oxon; Cornell, MA Econ; LSE Ph.D
- Scientific career
- Fields: Business economics
- Workplaces: Bayes Business School
- Website: www.baden-fuller.com

Charles Baden-Fuller is a British strategy scholar currently serving as the Centenary Professor of Strategy and leader of the Strategy Group at the Cass Business School.

Baden-Fuller is also a fellow of the Strategic Management Society as well as a Senior Fellow at the Wharton School of the University of Pennsylvania. He was elected a Fellow of the British Academy in 2020.

He was Editor-in-Chief of Long Range Planning between 1999 and 2010.

== Research Areas ==
Baden-Fuller has been working on improving understanding of the topic of “Business Models” and what this concept means and how the idea of business models influences our thinking in strategy. With John Stopford, he co-led a major project, examining mature firms and mature industries between 1984 and 1989. The project led to more than 30 research papers in journals and books. He suggested the importance of cognitive limitations among managers and on detailing the processes of how firms can rejuvenate in hostile environments.

== Publications ==
Baden-Fuller C, Mary Morgan (2010), 'Business Models as Models', Long Range Planning, Vol 43 (2-3): 156-171 (700 Google Scholar, 140 ISI citations)

Baden-Fuller, C. and Haefliger, S. (2013), 'Business models and technological innovation'. Long range planning, 46(6), pp. 419–426.

Baden-Fuller, C. and Mangematin, V. (2013), 'Business models: A challenging agenda'. Strategic Organization, 11(4), pp. 418–427.

Rejuvenating the Mature Business (with J M Stopford), Harvard Business School Press, Boston Mass.1994, 281 pages. (also translated into 5 languages; 500 Google cites)

Creating Corporate Entrepreneurship (with J.M. Stopford) Strategic Management Journal, 1994, vol 15(7): 521-536 (880 Google cites, 180 ISI Citations)

Competitive Groups as Cognitive Communities: The Case of Scottish Knitwear Manufacturers (with J F Porac and H Thomas), Journal of Management Studies, 1989 Vol 26 (4): 397–416. (more than 1,200 Google cites, 470 ISI Citations)
