= Gloria Agyemang =

Accountancy academic

- Born: Gloria Edusei
- Education: University of Ghana; McGill University
- Occupation: Accountancy academic
- Employer: Royal Holloway, University of London

Gloria Agyemang (nee Edusei) is an academic, who is the Professor of Accounting and Head of the School of Business and Management at Royal Holloway, University of London. Agyemang's research interests include accounting in less-developed and emerging economies and the management of educational institutions, non-governmental organisations and public sector organisations. In 2020, Agyemang was featured in Phenomenal Women, a photographic exhibition about black female professors in the UK.

== Life ==
Gloria Agyemang is an academic, who is the Professor of Accounting and Head of the School of Business and Management at Royal Holloway, University of London. Her research interests include accounting in less-developed and emerging economies and the management of educational institutions, non-governmental organisations and public sector organisations. Agyemang was an undergraduate student at the University of Ghana and a postgraduate at McGill University, and worked for accountancy firms in Ghana and the UK. In 2006, Agyemang was awarded her PhD by Royal Holloway and was appointed as a lecturer there. She previously worked in teaching and management roles in several other universities in the UK, Ghana and Zimbabwe, including at University College Worcester and Thames Valley University.

Agyemang has been a trustee of EduSpots UK, an organisation building community education networks, since 2021, and was elected Chair of Trustees in January 2024 .

In 2020, Agyemang was featured in Phenomenal Women, a photographic exhibition about black female professors in the UK.
