= Franklin Obeng-Odoom =

Professor

- Born: 1981 (age 44–45); Cape Coast, Ghana
- Occupations: Professor and author
- Writing career
- Subjects: Political Economy; Urban Economics; Economic Sociology; Land Economy
- Notable awards: Joan Robinson Prize 2021

Franklin Obeng-Odoom is a Ghanaian-Australian political economist, specialising in urban and regional economics, political economy of development, stratification economics, and the political economy of natural resources. He is a Fellow of the Ghana Academy of Arts and Sciences and Academy of Social Sciences.

== Early life and education ==
Obeng-Odoom was born in Ghana. He completed his bachelor's degree in land economy in Ghana before studying urban economic development in England and political economy in Australia.

== Career ==
Obeng-Odoom was a researcher at Global Poverty Project, Australia. He then taught at the University of Sydney as a Teaching Fellow before becoming a Chancellor's Postdoctoral Research Fellow and Senior Lecturer in Property Economics at the University of Technology Sydney.

Obeng-Odoom was Associate Professor of Social Sustainability of Urban Transformations in the Global South, at Global Development Studies and the Helsinki Institute of Sustainability Science in Finland. In 2021, he became a Docent in Sociology (Urban and Economic Sociology) at the University of Turku.

Currently, Obeng-Odoom is Professor of Global Development Studies at the University of Helsinki, Finland. Obeng-Odoom serves as an Associate Editor of the Forum for Social Economics and Series Editor of Edinburgh Studies in Urban Political Economy.

== Selected publications ==
- Obeng-Odoom, Franklin (2011). "The Informal Sector in Ghana Under Siege". Journal of Developing Societies. 27 (3/4): 355–392. doi:10.1177/0169796X1102700406. hdl:10453/18737.
- Obeng-Odoom, Franklin (2015). "Africa: On the rise, but to where?". Forum for Social Economics. 44 (3): 234–250. doi:10.1080/07360932.2014.955040. hdl:10453/30276.
- Obeng-Odoom, Franklin (2023). "Rethinking Development Economics: Problems and Prospects of Georgist Political Economy". Review of Political Economy. 35 (1): 316–333. doi:10.1080/09538259.2021.1928334. hdl:10138/354109.

=== Books ===
- Obeng-Odoom, Franklin (2014). Oiling the urban economy: land, labour, capital, and the state in Sekondi-Takoradi, Ghana. Routledge studies in international real estate. New York, NY: Routledge. ISBN 978-0-415-74409-6.
- Obeng-Odoom, Franklin (2016). Reconstructing urban economics: towards a political economy of the built environment. London: Zed Books Ltd. ISBN 978-1-78360-659-7. OCLC 936144105.
- Obeng-Odoom, Franklin (2020). Property, institutions, and social stratification in Africa. Cambridge studies in stratification economics. Cambridge, United Kingdom New York, NY: Cambridge University Press. ISBN 978-1-108-49199-0.
- Obeng-Odoom, Franklin (2021). The commons in an age of uncertainty: decolonizing nature, economy, and society. Toronto; Buffalo; London: University of Toronto Press. ISBN 978-1-4875-0176-1. OCLC 1145338068.
- Obeng-Odoom, Franklin (2022). Global migration beyond limits: ecology, economics, and political economy. Oxford, United Kingdom: Oxford University Press. ISBN 978-0-19-886718-0. OCLC 1261879995.
