= Friederike Mengel =

German economist

Friederike Mengel (born March 27, 1979) is a German economist who is a professor of economics at the University of Essex.

== Education and career ==
Friederike Mengel earned an undergraduate degree in economics from the University of Mainz in 2003, followed by a PhD in economics from the University of Alicante in 2008, under the supervision of Fernando Vega Redondo. After her PhD, she joined Maastricht University where she was an assistant professor from 2008 to 2011 and an associate professor from 2011 to 2013. After a period at the University of Nottingham, she joined the University of Essex in 2012 where she has been a professor since 2015. In 2019 she received the Philipp Leverhulme Prize in Economics.

== Research ==
Mengel's research areas are (evolutionary) game theory, learning, behavioral economics, social networks and experimental economics. She developed a theory of learning across games, where agents might partition a set of all games into categories. Learning across games can destabilize strict Nash equilibria even for arbitrarily small reasoning costs and even if players distinguish all the games at the stable point. The model is also able to explain a number of experimental findings.

Mengel has also done work on social identity and on how people learn in social networks. Her work uncovered that people pay attention to others network position when learning, but only partially and they do not update in a Bayesian way. Their work with J. Kovarik and J. Romero was awarded the Best Paper Award by the Econometric Society in 2019.

== Selected publications ==
- Drago, Francesco; Mengel, Friederike; Traxler, Christian (April 1, 2020). "Compliance Behavior in Networks: Evidence from a Field Experiment" (PDF). American Economic Journal: Applied Economics. 12 (2): 96–133. doi:10.1257/app.20170690.
- Kovářík, Jaromír; Mengel, Friederike; Romero, José Gabriel (March 2018). "Learning in network games: Learning in network games". Quantitative Economics. 9 (1): 85–139. doi:10.3982/QE688. hdl:10419/195564.
- Grimm, Veronika; Mengel, Friederike (November 2012). "An experiment on learning in a multiple games environment". Journal of Economic Theory. 147 (6): 2220–2259. doi:10.1016/j.jet.2012.05.011.
- Mengel, Friederike (March 2012). "Learning across games". Games and Economic Behavior. 74 (2): 601–619. doi:10.1016/j.geb.2011.08.020.
- Mengel, Friederike (August 2020). "Gender differences in networking". The Economic Journal. 130 (630): 1842–1873. doi:10.1093/ej/ueaa035.
- Mengel, Friederike; Sauermann, Jan; Zölitz, Ulf (April 2019). "Gender Bias in Teaching Evaluations". Journal of the European Economic Association. 17 (2): 535–566. doi:10.1093/jeea/jvx057. hdl:10419/185467.
- Calo-Blanco, Aitor; Kovářík, Jaromír; Mengel, Friederike; Romero, José Gabriel (June 7, 2017). "Natural disasters and indicators of social cohesion". PLOS ONE. 12 (6) e0176885. Bibcode:2017PLoSO..1276885C. doi:10.1371/journal.pone.0176885. PMC 5462365. PMID 28591148.
