= Judith Phillips =

Welsh gerontologist (born 1959)

Judith Eleri Phillips OBE (born 7 February 1959) is a Welsh gerontologist. She has been Professor of Gerontology and Social Work at Swansea University since 2004.

== Early life and career ==
Phillips was educated at Pontypridd Girls' Grammar School, Aberystwyth University (BA, 1980), Jesus College, Oxford (MSc, 1983) and the University of East Anglia (PhD, 1989). She was a lecturer in Social Work at the University of East Anglia from 1989 to 1993, and Professor of Social Gerontology at Keele University from 2001 to 2004. She has been Scientific Director of the Centre for Innovative Ageing and Director of the Research Institute for Applied Social Science at Swansea University since 2009.

She was made an OBE in 2013. She was elected a fellow of the Royal Society of Edinburgh in 2024.
