= Jean-Paul Faguet =

English academic and economist

Jean-Paul Faguet is professor of the political economy of development at the London School of Economics and Political Science (LSE) and author or editor of six books and many academic and news articles, including Is Decentralization Good for Development? Perspectives from Academics and Policy Makers, and Decentralization and Popular Democracy: Governance from Below in Bolivia, which won the Political Science Association's W.J.M. Mackenzie award for best political science book of 2012. He has advised the governments of numerous developing countries, as well as the World Bank, Inter-American Development Bank and the United Nations on local government reforms, poverty alleviation programs, decentralization, and the design of social investment funds. He is ranked amongst the global top 0.5% of social scientists according to the Social Science Research Network, and the global 1% of economics authors according to RePEc (Research Papers in Economics).

He is known for the "One-country, large-N" empirical approach, using blended quantitative and qualitative methods for the analysis of complex problems of political economy and public policy. He is Chair of the Decentralization Task Force at Columbia University, part of Joseph Stiglitz's Initiative for Policy Dialogue, and head of the LSE's MSc in Development Management

In 2008-09 he was a visiting professor at the University of California, Berkeley. In 2016 he was a visiting researcher at University of North Carolina at Chapel Hill and in 2017 he was a visiting researcher at Stanford University. Previously he worked for the World Bank in La Paz, Bolivia. He studied political science and economics at Princeton University, Harvard University and the London School of Economics, where his dissertation won the William Robson Memorial Prize.

== Selected publications ==
=== Books ===
- Faguet, J.P. and S. Pal (Eds.). 2023. Decentralized Governance: Crafting Effective Democracies Around the World. London: LSE Press.
- Faguet, J.P. and C. Pöschl (eds.). 2015. Is Decentralization Good for Development? Perspectives from Academics and Policy Makers. Oxford: Oxford University Press.
- Faguet, JP (ed.). 2014. “Decentralization and Governance.” Special Issue of World Development, 53: 1–112.
- Khan, Q., J.P. Faguet, C. Gaukler and W. Mekasha. 2014. Improving Basic Services for the Bottom Forty Percent: Lessons from Ethiopia. Washington, D.C.: World Bank.
- Faguet, JP. 2012. Decentralization and Popular Democracy: Governance from Below in Bolivia. Ann Arbor: University of Michigan Press.
- Zuazo, M, JP Faguet, and G Bonifaz (eds.). 2012. Descentralización y democratización en Bolivia: La historia del Estado débil, la sociedad rebelde y el anhelo de democracia. La Paz: Friedrich Ebert Stiftung.

=== Non-Academic Press ===
- Faguet, J.P. 21 October 2015. “Expert Commentary: Better for Business.” The Cipher Brief
- Faguet, J.P.. 15 October 2015. “Interview: After Riding Commodities Boom, Bolivia Faces Stress of Falling Prices.” World Politics Review
- Faguet, J.P. 27 October 2014. “Es notable que los países que más inversión extranjera atraen, tienden a ser federales y no unitarios.” FAO AgroNoticias América Latina y el Caribe
- Faguet, J.P. 17 September 2014. “Scottish independence: David Cameron is becoming the 'George Bush of Britain'” The Independent

At LSE, he teaches courses on Development Management and Revolution and Development.
