= Gerardo J. Meléndez-Torres =

Gerardo J. "G.J." Meléndez-Torres is professor of Clinical and Social Epidemiology at the University of Exeter, England and a member of the Peninsula Technology Assessment Group. In 2024, he was awarded senior investigator status at the NIHR in recognition of his outstanding contribution to research.

He studied at the Wharton School, University of Pennsylvania where he graduated with a B.S. in Economics and Health Policy and a B.S. in Nursing. He was selected as a Truman Scholar in 2010, and won a Marshall scholarship in 2011 to pursue a MPhil in evidence-based social intervention at Oxford University. He subsequently completed a doctorate in social intervention at the University of Oxford.

Meléndez-Torres works widely across areas of public health, including mental health in children and youths. In 2024, Meléndez-Torres was awarded senior investigator status at the NIHR in recognition of his outstanding contribution to research.

Meléndez-Torres is a founding member of the UK Young Academy.
