= David Hassan =

Northern Irish academic and writer

- Born: 16 November 1972 (age 53); Derry, Northern Ireland
- Occupation: Educator
- Writing career
- Language: English

David Hassan (born 16 November 1972, in Derry, Northern Ireland) is an academic, writer, and associate dean of the Faculty of Life and Health Sciences (Global Engagement) at Ulster University. He is also provost of the university's Belfast campus. He has been involved in collaborative work with the Fédération Internationale de l'Automobile (FIA).

== Early life and education ==
A native of Feeny, County Londonderry, Northern Ireland and a former pupil of St Columb's College, Derry, Hassan obtained a first class Bachelor of Arts degree in 1997, a Master of Science degree in 1998 and the degree of Doctor of Philosophy in 2001. His thesis, examining the relationship between sport and nationalism in Ireland, was supervised by the political scientist Professor Alan Bairner and drawn from research work he conducted during the late 1990s when sport in Northern Ireland was heavily infiltrated by political influences.

== Academic career ==
In 2006, Hassan was awarded a Distinguished Research Fellowship by the University of Ulster. His views on sport governance have included observations on the efficacy of the sporting model employed by the Gaelic Athletic Association (GAA). In August 2012, he was a speaker at an event held in the Oxford University Club.

Hassan is a co-director of the Special Olympics Regional Research Collaborating Centre for Europe-Eurasia, which was opened at Ulster University's Jordanstown campus in April 2011. He is also a member of the European Federation of Adapted Physical Activity and delivered an address at its conference in May 2012 in the Republic of Ireland.

As of 2015, Hassan was academic editor of the sports academic journal "Sport in Society", and editor of the Foundations in Sport Management series by the academic publishers Routledge. Also in 2015, he was appointed to a strategic committee, 'Towards 150', of the GAA.

As of 2017, he had published 14 books and over 160 other research outputs, including 75 peer reviewed articles in a number of journals and book chapters.

== Sports ==
A member of his local GAA club, St. Mary's GAC, Banagher, Hassan was part of the Derry senior football management team as of 2013. In association football, Hassan reputedly played with Cliftonville FC.

Hassan has appeared on radio and television sports programmes, including the BBC radio documentary 'Does the Cap Fit?', and the Dubai Sports TV 'Motorstar 2011'. He has spoken publicly on GAA governance and management.

== Bibliography ==
- Hassan, D. (2018) Managing Sport Business: An Introduction (2nd Edition) (Routledge, London). (Published 15 March 2018: ISBN 1138291382).
- Acton, C. and Hassan, D. (2017) Sport and Contested Identities (Routledge, London).
- McElligott, R. and Hassan, D. (2016) A Social and Cultural History of Sport in Ireland (Routledge, London). (Published 31 May 2016: ISBN 113810129X). 164 pages
- Hassan, D. and Mitra, S. (2014) The Olympic Games: Meeting New Global Challenges (Routledge, London). (Published 30 May 2014; ISBN 978-0-415-74176-7). 190 pages.
- Hassan, D., McConkey, R. and Dowling, S. (2014) Sport, Coaching and Intellectual Disability (Routledge, London). (Published 31 January 2014; ISBN 978-0415735773). 232 pages.
- Hassan, D. (2013) Ethnicity and Race in Association Football: Case Study analyses in Europe, Africa and the USA (Routledge, London). (Published 4 November 2013; ISBN 978-0415725224). 168 pages.
- Ben Sulayem, M., O’Connor, S. and Hassan, D. (2013) Sport Management in the Middle East: A Case Study Analysis (Routledge, London). (Published 3 April 2013; ISBN 978-0415677301). 209 pages.
- Hassan, D. and Lusted, J. (2012) Managing Sport: Social and Cultural Perspectives. (Routledge: London). (Published 22 October 2012; ISBN 978-0415572163). 344 pages.
- Hassan, D. and Brown, S. (2012) Sport and the Community (Routledge: London). (Published 1 October 2012; ISBN 978-0415571654). 160 pages.
- Hassan, D. (2011) The History of World Motor Sport (Routledge: London). (Published 12 July 2011; ISBN 978-0-415-67788-2). 144 pages.
- Trenberth, L. and Hassan, D. (2011) Managing Sport Business: An Introduction (Routledge: London). (Published 2 September 2011: ISBN 978-0415570299).496 pages.
- Hassan, D. and Hamil, S. (2010) Who Owns Football? Models of Football Governance and Management in International Sport: The Governance and Management of the Club Game Worldwide (Routledge: London). (Published 17 November 2010: Â ISBN 978-0415445702). 184 pages.
- McAnallen, D. Hassan, D. and Hegarty, R. (2009) The Evolution of the GAA Pobal, Club, Contae agus Tir (Ulster Historical Foundation: Belfast). (Published 30 November 2009: ISBN 978-1903688830). 334 pages.
- Darby, P. and Hassan, D. (2008) Emigrant Players: Sport and the Irish Diaspora (Routledge: London). (Published 25 June 2008; ISBN 978-0415464918). 232 pages
