= Ziyad Marar =

Iraqi-born British author

- زياد مرار
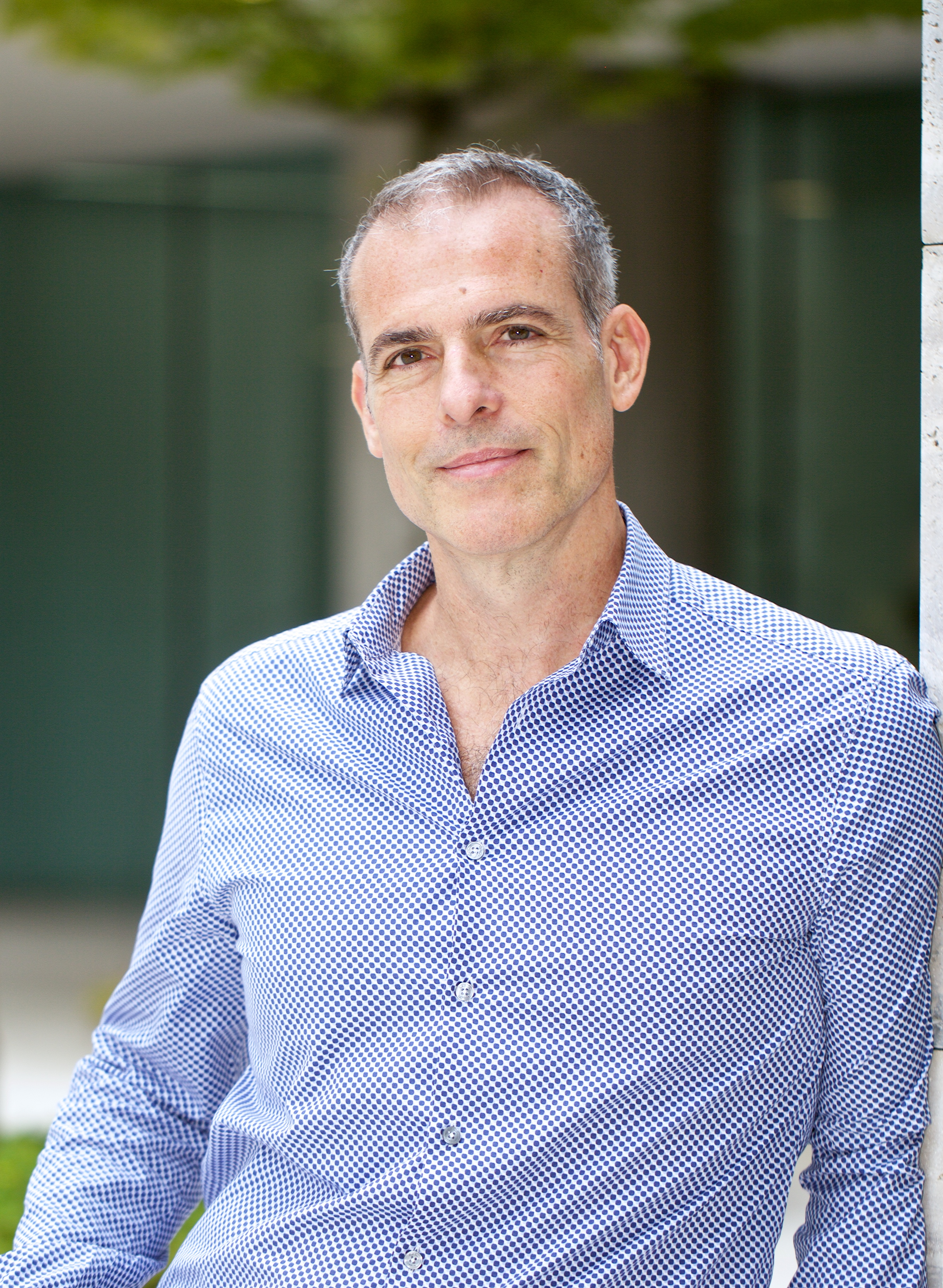
- Ziyad Marar in 2017
- Born: 1966 (age 59–60); Baghdad, Iraq
- Education: Exeter University, and Birkbeck, University of London
- Occupations: Business executive, author
- Known for: President of Sage Publishing
- Children: 3

Ziyad Marar (Arabic:زياد مرار) is a British author and President of Global Publishing at Sage Publishing. He was born in 1966 in Iraq, and moved to London aged 10. He has published five books combining his interests in psychology and philosophy. His fifth Noticing: How We Attend to the World and Each Other was published in 2025.

== Early years and education ==
Marar was born in 1966 in Baghdad, Iraq, then lived in Riyadh, Saudi Arabia and Beirut, Lebanon before moving with his family to London in the late 1970s. He attended Exeter University where he obtained a BSc in psychology. He completed an MA in the philosophy and psychology of language from Birkbeck, University of London.

== Career ==
Marar joined Sage Publishing in 1989. He was appointed Editorial Director in 1997, Deputy Managing Director in 2006, and took on a more global role in 2010 as Global Publishing Director. In 2016, Marar was promoted to President, Global Publishing where he has overall responsibility for Sage's publishing strategy .

In later years at Sage, Marar has also focused on supporting the social sciences more generally. He has spoken and written on this theme in various international contexts. In early 2015 was appointed to the board of the Campaign for Social Science (CfSS) and in 2020 he was elected as a fellow of the Academy of Social Science, an event he reflected on in a widely read article for Social Science Space.

In 2015, Marar was invited to sit on the board of trustees for the UK academic news site, The Conversation.

He also sits on the boards of the Big House Theatre Company, and The Ceasefire Centre for Civilian Rights.

== Personal life ==
He lives in London with his wife and three daughters.

== Publications ==
Marar has written five books:

- The Happiness Paradox - covering how philosophy and psychology can create a better understanding of modern identity, Reaktion Books 2003
- Deception - about people's relationship with truth and the possibility of a truly honest life, Acumen Publishing 2008
- Intimacy - Understanding the Subtle Power of Human Connection, Acumen Publishing 2012.
- Judged: - The Value of Being Misunderstood, Bloomsbury, 2018.
- Noticing: How We Attend to the World and Each Other, Bloomsbury, 2025.
