= Phillip Brown (sociologist) =

British sociologist

Professor Phillip Brown FLSW (born 21 April 1957), a British sociologist of education, economy and social change, is Distinguished Research Professor in the School of Social Sciences at Cardiff University. He is a prominent modern sociologist and currently the author of seventeen books (five published by Oxford University Press and six translated into foreign languages) and over 100 articles and reports. Since 2005 he has given keynote presentation in over 17 counties around the world, including the World Bank in Washington and International Labour Organization in Geneva and EU in Brussels.

== Biography ==
Phillip, born in 1957, was brought up in Oxfordshire in the UK. He started his working life as an apprentice at the British Leyland car factory in Cowley, Oxford, before going to college to study Sociology. He received his PhD at Swansea University, Wales, his thesis on social class, education and the transition to employment in a period of high youth unemployment was later published as Schooling Ordinary Kids (1987). He was then appointed as a post-doc researcher at the Cambridge Institute of Criminology from 1985 to 1987 followed by a lectureship in Industrial Sociology at the University of Kent (1987–97). He became a Reader in Sociology at Kent before moving to the School of Social Sciences, Cardiff University in 1997. Since 1997 to present Phillip has remained at Cardiff University as a Distinguished Research Professor. In 2011, Phillip was elected a Fellow of the Learned Society of Wales.

== Academic work ==
Phillip's current research Interests include, rethinking human capital theory, education, technology and the future of Work, sociology of talent and global talent market, education, social stratification and the prospects for social mobility, the positional competition and social congestion theory and finally the future of skill formation and the global division of labour

Generally he explores the transformation of education, employment and labour markets since the rise of neo-liberalism in the 1970s, including empirical studies of education, employment and social stratification in Britain, alongside comparative studies of skills and the global division of labour in China, France, Germany, India, Korea, Singapore, the United States and more. He's been a visiting professor at the University of British Columbia, Sciences Po in Paris, and the University of Turku. Phillip is currently a visiting professor at the Centre for Skills, Performance and Productivity Research, Institute for Adult Learning/Workforce Development Agency, Singapore and a Distinguished Visiting Professor, Zhengzhou University, China. Phillip is currently leading a review of the 'Digital Innovation for the Economy and the Future of Work in Wales'.

Qualifications	
2015	DSc (Econ), Cardiff University.
1985	Ph.D entitled Schooling and the School/Post-School Transition in Urban South Wales. Funded by a University of Wales College Scholarship.
1981	1st Class B.Ed. Honours Degree in Social and Community Studies (CNAA).
1973-1977	Parts I, II, and III City and Guilds Institute of London (Sheetmetal and Thinplate Craft Studies).

== Books ==
Year	Title
1987	Schooling Ordinary Kids: Inequality, Unemployment and the New Vocationalism, London: Tavistock, pp.Â 210.
1990	Intermediate Treatment: Key Findings and Implications from a National Survey, London, HMSO, pp. 192.Â Bottoms, A., Brown, P., McWilliams, B., McWilliams, W. andÂ Nellis, M.
1994	Higher Education and Corporate Realities: Class, Culture and the Decline of Graduate Careers, London: UCL Press. Brown, P. & Scase, R., pp.Â 197.
2001	Capitalism and Social Progress: The Future of Society in a Global Economy, Baskingstoke: Palgrave. Brown, P. and Lauder H., pp.Â 350.
2001	High Skills: Globalization, Competitiveness and Skill Formation, Oxford: Oxford University Press. Brown, P., Green, A. and Lauder, H., pp.Â 300.
2004	The Mismanagement of Talent: Employability and Jobs in the Knowledge Economy, Oxford: Oxford University Press. Brown, P. and Hesketh, A. with Williams, S., pp.Â 278.
2011	The Global Auction: The Broken Promises of Education, Jobs and Incomes, New York: Oxford University Press. Brown, P., Lauder, H. and Ashton, D., pp.Â 224.
2019	[Forthcoming] The Death of Human Capital?, New York: Oxford University Press. Brown, P., H.Lauder and Cheung, S.Y

== Volumes & Translated Books ==
2014	The Global Auction: The Broken Promises of Education, Jobs and Incomes, P. Brown, H. Lauder and D. Ashton, Korean Translation, Seoul, Kaemakowon Publishing.
2014	The Global Auction: The Broken Promises of Education, Jobs and Incomes, P. Brown, H. Lauder and D. Ashton, Chinese translation, Beijing, Hunan Science and Technology Press.
2013	Education and Social Mobility. Special (Double) Issue of the British Journal of Sociology of Education, 34, 4–5, 637–964. Brown, P., Reay, D. and C.Vincent (Invited Editors). Published as an Edited collection by Routledge, 2016.
2013	Education: Culture, Economy and Society, Edited by H.Lauder, P. Brown, J. Dillabough and A.H.Halsey. South Korean translation in abridged form Hanul Publishing.
2012	Education, Globalization and Social Change, Edited by H.Lauder, P. Brown, J. Dillabough and A.H.Halsey. Japanese translation in abridged form in two volumes, edited by T.Kariya et al., University of Tokyo Press, pp. 354 + pp. 370.
2006	Education, Globalization and Social Change, Lauder, H., Brown, P., Dillabough, J.A. and Halsey, A.H. (Eds.), Oxford: Oxford University Press, pp.xxii + 1182.
2006	Capitalism and Social Progress: The Future of Society in a Global Economy, P. Brown and H. Lauder. Chinese translation, Chinese Academy of Social Sciences, pp. 447.
2005	Education: Culture, Economy and Society, Oxford University Press, Edited by A.H. Halsey, H. Lauder, P. Brown and A.S. Wells. Japanese translation in abridged form, published by Kyushu University Press, pp. 662.
1997	Education: Culture, Economy and Society. Halsey, A.H., Lauder, H., Brown, P. & Wells, A.S. (eds.) Oxford University Press, pp.i-xxii + 819.
1994	A New Europe: Economic Restructuring and Social Exclusion, London: UCL Press/British Sociological Association. Brown, P. & Crompton, R. (Eds.), pp. 252.
1992	Education for Economic Survival: From Fordism to Post-Fordism?, London: Routledge, pp. 267. Brown, P. & Lauder, H. (Eds.)
1991	Poor Work: Disadvantage and the Division of Labour, Milton Keynes: Open University Press, pp. 168. Brown, P. & Scase, R. (Eds.)
1990	Childhood, Youth and Social Change: A Comparative Perspective, Lewes: Falmer, pp. 278. Chisholm L., Buchner P., Kruger H. & Brown, P. (Eds.)
1989	Beyond Thatcherism: Social Policy, Politics and Society, Milton Keynes: Open University Press, pp. 159. Brown, P. & Sparks, R. (Eds.).
1988	Education: In Search of a Future, Lewes: Falmer, pp. 252. Lauder, H. & Brown, P. (Eds.).
