= Brendan Gough =

British social psychology scholar

Brendan Gough is an Irish scholar in the field of critical social psychology. His research explores masculinity, primarily using qualitative methods. As of 2024, he is the Director of Research at Leeds Beckett University. Gough co-founded the journal Qualitative Research in Psychology, for which he also serves as co-editor; additionally, he is the Editor-in-Chief of the journal Social & Personality Psychology Compass.

Gough earned his Doctor of Philosophy from Queen's University Belfast in 1993. He became a fellow of the Academy of Social Sciences in 2016.

== Books ==
=== Authored ===
- Gough, Brendan; McFadden, Majella (2001). Critical Social Psychology: An Introduction. Palgrave.
  - Gough, Brendan; McFadden, Majella; McDonald, Matthew (2013). Critical Social Psychology: An Introduction (2nd ed.). Macmillan Education UK. ISBN 978-0-230-30385-0.
- Gough, Brendan; McFadden, Majella (2001). Critical Social Psychology: An Introduction. Palgrave.
- Gough, Brendan; Robertson, S. (2010). Men, Masculinities and Health: Critical Perspectives. Palgrave MacMillan. ISBN 978-0-230-20312-9.
- Gough, Brendan (2018). Contemporary Masculinities: Embodiment, Emotion and Wellbeing. SpringerLink. ISBN 978-3-319-78819-7.
- Hanna, Esmée Sinéad; Gough, Brendan (2022). (In)Fertile Male Bodies: Masculinities and Lifestyle Management in Neoliberal Times. Emerald Publishing Limited. ISBN 978-1-800-71609-4.

=== Edited ===
- Finlay, Linda; Gough, Brendan, eds. (2003). Reflexivity: A Practical Guide for Researchers in Health and Social Sciences. Malden, MA: Blackwell Science. ISBN 978-0-632-06414-4.
  - Finlay, Linda; Gough, Brendan, eds. (2008). Reflexivity: A Practical Guide for Researchers in Health and Social Sciences (2nd ed.). Hoboken: John Wiley & Sons, Ltd. ISBN 978-0-470-77698-8.
- Gough, Brendan, ed. (2015). Qualitative Research in Psychology. Sage Reference. ISBN 978-1-4462-8233-5.
- Gough, Brendan, ed. (2017). The Palgrave Handbook of Critical Social Psychology. Palgrave handbooks. London: Palgrave Macmillan. ISBN 978-1-137-51017-4.
