= Jim Stevenson (psychologist) =

British psychologist

- Born: James Eric Stevenson; 14 January 1947 (age 79)
- Known for: Attention-deficit hyperactivity disorder; Reading disability
- Scientific career
- Fields: Child psychology
- Workplaces: University of Southampton

James Eric Stevenson (born 14 January 1947) is a British child psychologist who is Emeritus Professor of Developmental Psychopathology at the University of Southampton. He is known for his research on behavior problems in children, such as attention-deficit hyperactivity disorder and reading disability. He was the founding editor of the Annual Research Review issue of the Journal of Child Psychology and Psychiatry, and subsequently served as the editor of this journal.
