= Neil Small =

Neil Small is professor of health research at the University of Bradford. He previously held posts at the University of Sheffield and the University of York. He is a fellow of the Academy of Social Sciences. His book Living and Dying with Dementia – Dialogues about Palliative Care won in the category Non-Clinical Medical Book at the Society of Authors and the Royal Society of Medicine Medical Book Awards 2008.

He is a member of the academic team of Born in Bradford and has recently been the co-author of a study of infant mortality in the London Borough of Redbridge which concluded that one in five such deaths were because the parents were related.

== Selected publications ==
- Froggatt, K., Small, N., Downs, M. (2007) Living and Dying with Dementia – Dialogues about Palliative Care. Oxford, Oxford University Press.
- Small, N., Clark, D., Wright, M., Winslow, M. and Hughes, N. (2005) A Bit of Heaven for the Few? An Oral History of the Hospice Movement. Lancaster, Observatory Press.
- Small, N., Hockey, J. and Katz, J. (2001) Grief, Mourning and Death Ritual. Milton Keynes, Open University Press.
