= Sarah A. Radcliffe =

British geographer

Sarah Anne Radcliffe FBA FAcSS (born 1960) is a geographer and academic, who is Professor in Latin American Geography at the University of Cambridge and a fellow of Christ's College, Cambridge. She is an editor at the Progress in Human Geography journal. In 2020 she was elected a Fellow of the British Academy.

Radcliffe studied geography and anthropology at University College London, graduating with a Bachelor of Science (BSc) degree in 1982. She then undertook postgraduate research in geography at the University of Liverpool, completing her Doctor of Philosophy (PhD) degree in 1986. Her doctoral thesis was titled "Women's lives and peasant livelihood strategies: a study of migration in the Peruvian Andes".

== Bibliography ==
- Culture and Development in a Globalizing World (2006) (Editor)
- Entangling Resistance, Ethnicity, Gender and Nation in Ecuador (2002)
- Re-Haciendo la Nacion: lugar, identidad y politica en America Latina (1999) (Spanish translation of 1996 book)
- Re-Making the Nation: place, politics and identity in Latin America (1996)
- Viva: women and popular protest in Latin America (1993)
- Paper prepared for the workshop "Beyond the lost decade: indigenous movements and the transformation of development and democracy in Latin America" University of Princeton, 2-3 March 2001
