= Rona Moss-Morris =

Academic researcher from South Africa

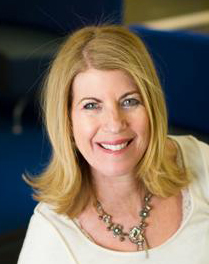
- King's College portrait, 2013

Rona Moss-Morris is Head of Health Psychology and Chair in Psychology as Applied to Medicine at the Institute of Psychiatry, King's College London. Her research investigates long-term, medically unexplained disorders such as chronic fatigue syndrome (CFS) and irritable bowel syndrome (IBS). She joined the IoP in 2011 and presented an inaugural lecture entitled "Trials and tribulations: A journey towards integrated care for long term conditions."

== Academic career ==
Growing up in South Africa, Rona studied occupational therapy at the University of Cape Town, where she was awarded a BSc. She worked clinically in mental health in South Africa as an occupational therapist before immigrating in 1988 to New Zealand.

At the University of Auckland, she studied for a Masters and PhD in health psychology. Her doctoral thesis was titled Cognitive factors in the maintenance of chronic fatigue syndrome. She worked at the University of Auckland as a lecturer and whilst on the faculty helped to set up a Masters course in Health Psychology.

In 2006, Rona moved again, this time to the University of Southampton in the UK and was made Professor of Health Psychology in 2007. Here she researched, amongst other topics, the links between chronic illness and personality factors (for example the link between IBS and perfectionism).

She is currently a professor at the Institute of Psychiatry in South London, where she joined the Department of Psychology in 2011.

== Research ==
Rona has dedicated her academic career to investigating chronic fatigue syndrome (CFS), irritable bowel syndrome (IBS) and post-concussion syndrome. This work has included attempts to model and treat the disorders as well as understanding psychological factors involved in reactions to chronic illness as well as how the patient and their family adjust to the symptoms. She has spoken at public engagement events on the relationship between stress and illness. She has developed a web-based version of a CBT Package called MSInvigor8.

== Publications ==
Rona has co-authored a book with Keith Petrie entitled Chronic Fatigue Syndrome (Experience of Illness).

Rona has contributed to over 61 academic articles in a variety of peer-reviewed journals. The following are a selection of the few most recent:

- Chilcot, J.; Moss-Morris, R. (2013). "Changes in illness-related cognitions rather than distress mediate improvements in irritable bowel syndrome (IBS) symptoms and disability following a brief cognitive behavioural therapy intervention". Behaviour Research and Therapy. 51 (10): 690–695. doi:10.1016/j.brat.2013.07.007. PMID 23948131.
- Tamagawa, R.; Moss-Morris, R.; Martin, A.; Robinson, E.; Booth, R. J. (2013). "Dispositional emotion coping styles and physiological responses to expressive writing". British Journal of Health Psychology. 18 (3): 574–92. doi:10.1111/bjhp.12004. PMID 23126551.
- Powell, D. J. H., Liossi, C., Moss-Morris, R. & Schlotz, W. (2013) Unstimulated cortisol secretory activity in everyday life and its relationship with fatigue and chronic fatigue syndrome: A systematic review and subset meta-analysis Psychoneuroendocrinology
- Dima, A.; Lewith, G. T.; Little, P.; Moss-Morris, R.; Foster, N. E.; Bishop, F. L. (2013). "Identifying patients' beliefs about treatments for chronic low back pain in primary care: a focus group study". British Journal of General Practice. 63 (612): 490–8. doi:10.3399/bjgp13x669211. PMC 3693806. PMID 23834886.
- Everitt, H.; Moss-Morris, R.; Sibelli, A.; Tapp, L.; Coleman, N.; Yardley, L.; Smith, P.; Little, P. (2013). "Management of irritable bowel syndrome in primary care: the results of an exploratory randomised controlled trial of mebeverine, methylcellulose, placebo and a self-management website". BMC Gastroenterology. 13 (1): 68. doi:10.1186/1471-230x-13-68. PMC 3651308. PMID 23602047.

== Awards ==
Rona won MS Research of the Year as part of the Multiple Sclerosis Society Awards 2013 for her randomised controlled trial Adjusting to MS, which compared CBT and supportive listening to help people adjust to early stages of multiple sclerosis (MS).
