= Paul Connolly (education professor) =

Paul Connolly is Professor of Education at Queen's University Belfast and also holds the Donald Dewar Visiting Chair in Social Justice and Public Policy at the University of Glasgow. He is Director of the Centre for Effective Education and is also the founding editor of the international peer-reviewed academic journal, Effective Education.

Connolly is founder and Co-Director of Una - A Global Learning Initiative on Children and Ethnic Diversity. Una comprises a core network of over 70 leading researchers and practitioners from 31 different countries and seeks to support the development of early childhood programmes that address the negative effects of racial and ethnic divisions and conflict on young children's lives.

On 12 October 2017 he became a Fellow of the Academy of Social Sciences.
