= Tracey Reynolds =

British sociologist

- Born: Early 1970s Tooting, London, England
- Education: University of Greenwich
- Occupation: Social scientist
- Known for: One of only 45 Black female professors in the UK

Tracey Reynolds is a British sociologist and professor in the Faculty of Liberal Arts and Sciences at the University of Greenwich. She began working in academia in 1998 at London South Bank University in their Faculty of Arts, Humanities and Science. She is Professor of Social Sciences and Director of the Centre for Applied Sociology Research at the University of Greenwich.

== Biography ==
Reynolds was born in Tooting, South London, England, in the early 1970s and earned her PhD at the University of Greenwich.

Throughout her career, Reynolds has focused on researching families and social issues in the United Kingdom. Her research includes studies on the effects that living in low socioeconomic communities has on black and minority families. According to the University of Greenwich:

Her most recent collaborative projects provide training to community practitioners in participatory methodologies, co-produce creative tools and resources with local organisations to explore community resilience during COVID-19 pandemic, and utilise story-telling as an approach to consider the impact of hostile environment policies for migrant communities including those with long-established patterns of settlement in the UK (e.g Windrush Generation).

She is a co-investigator on the PASAR (Participation Arts and Social Action in Research) project of the Open University.

Reynolds has authored more than 80 publications in the form of books, journal articles, chapters in edited volumes, policy reports and working papers. Notably, she is author of Caribbean Mothers: Identity and Experience in the UK (published by Tufnell Press, 2005) and Transnational Families: Ethnicities, Identities and Social Capital with Harry Goulbourne, John Solomos and Elisabetta Zontini (published by Routledge, 2010).

Reynolds was one of several Black professors portrayed for The Guardian by photographer Bill Knight in March 2020, and in a national touring exhibition called Phenomenal Women: Portraits of UK Black Female Professors (October–November 2020).
