= Jenny Ozga =

Jennifer E Ozga FBA (b. 3 July 1948) is a British education policy researcher. She is professor emerita in the Department of Education at the University of Oxford. She was Professor of Sociology of Education at Oxford from 2010 to 2015 and has also worked at the University of Edinburgh, University of Strathclyde, Keele University, UWE Bristol, and the Open University. Ozga was elected as a fellow of the British Academy in 2013.
