= Davina Cooper =

Political and legal theorist

Davina Copper FBA is a legal scholar and research professor in Law and Political Theory at King's College London.

== Biography ==
Cooper was Research Dean for Social Sciences at Keele University from 2000 to 2003. From 2004 to 2009 she was a director of the AHRC Research Centre in Law, Gender, and Sexuality. She was elected as a Fellow of the British Academy in 2021 and is also a Fellow of the Academy of Social Sciences.

=== Select publications ===
- Cooper, D. 1995. Power in struggle: feminism, sexuality and the State. New York University Press.
- Grabham, E., Cooper, D., Krishnadas, J., and Herman, D. (eds) 2009. Intersectionality and beyond: law, power and the politics of location. Routledge.
- Cooper, D. 2013. Everyday Utopias: the conceptual life of promising spaces. Duke University Press.
- Cooper, D. 2019. Feeling like a State: Desire, Denial and the Recasting of Authority. Duke University Press.
