= Jon Billsberry =

British psychologist

Jon Billsberry (born September 1962 in London, England) is a British academic organisational psychologist at the University of Wollongong. He has held management roles in the Academy of Management, the Journal of Management Education, the Organisational Behaviour Teaching Society, and the British Academy of Management.

== Academic career ==
Billsberry studied at The King's School in Wolverhampton before studying Politics and Modern History at the University of Manchester. He graduated in 1984. Following his undergraduate studies, Billsberry sequentially worked as Systems Controller at Heavy Metal Records, Raw Materials Accountant at EMI Manufacturing and Distribution Services Ltd., Assistant Management Accountant at Phonogram Ltd., Senior Financial Analyst at Storecard Ltd., Financial Analyst at Morgen Grenfell Securities Ltd. and an Executive Search Consultant at Scott Collins Ltd. In 1991 he studied for an MBA (International) at the University of Birmingham.

Following this, he took up his first academic role as an ESRC Management Teaching Fellow at The Open University. Over sixteen years, he progressed and held roles as Lecturer in Organisational Behaviour and Senior Lecturer in the same field. In 2003, he was awarded his PhD in Applied Psychology by the University of Nottingham. His thesis looked at the role of person-organisation fit in attraction and selection decisions. In his last four years at The Open University, Billsberry was Director of Research in the University's Human Resource division. He retains a visiting position at The Open University Business School. In February 2009, he joined Coventry University Business School as Professor of Organisational Behaviour, leaving in April 2011. He joined Deakin University as Professor of Management.

In July 2019, he joined the University of Wollongong as Senior Professor of Management.

Outside of his university appointments, Billsberry has held several external positions. He was Chair of the Management Education and Development division of the Academy of Management. Prior to this elected role, he was the division's secretary. From 2005-2010, Billsberry chaired the Organisational Psychology track of the British Academy of Management and in 2006 set up a Special Interest Group (SIG) in the same discipline. In 2008, he was elected to serve on the Council of BAM.

Billsberry's main research interests are in organisational fit and the use of films in management education. He set up the annual Global e-Conference on Fit and still chairs the organising committee. He is also Head of the Fit Project, an applied research initiative into organisational fit, at The Open University. He has served as the Co-Editor (Teaching and Learning) of Organization Management Journal, the official journal of the Eastern Academy of Management, as an Associate Editor of the Journal of Management Education, before becoming Editor-in-Chief on 1 July 2012.

== Personal life ==
Jon Billsberry's wife is Véronique Ambrosini, who is a Professor of Management working at Monash University. They had been living together for eighteen years before marrying in April 2011. They live in Melbourne, Australia.

From 2001 to 2007, he was a member of Milton Keynes and Open University Chess Club. During this period he captained the Bedfordshire U125 team to the National Championship. He was also the captain of the Milton Keynes and Open University team that won the National Handicap Rapidplay Tournament and the National Club U125 Championship.
