= Peter Marsh (social scientist) =

British social scientist (born 1950)

Professor Peter Marsh (born 1950) is a British academic administrator and academic in the fields of sociology and social work. He is the Professor of Child and Family Welfare at the University of Sheffield and was the Dean of Social Sciences at the University from 2005-2008.

He has worked on practice development in the Primary Care Research and Development Unit at the University and is currently Academic Director of Enterprise. Current and recent research has been on a strategy for social work research, inter-disciplinarity, motivation and practice and the evaluation of different aspects of Family Group Conferences. He is professional advisor to the Research in Practice evidence-based services initiative.

He has been a visiting research fellow at the Office of the Commissioner for Children, Wellington, New Zealand; at the University of Connecticut, Child Welfare Research Centre and University of Albany, New York, Rockefeller College of Public Affairs & Policy, and a visiting lecturer at Norges Kommunalog Sosialhøgskole, Oslo.

He has contributed material to the Blackwell Companion to Social Work, one of the leading social work textbooks for undergraduates.

== Publications ==
A full list of publications is available at the website listed below.

- Marsh, Peter; Doel, M (1992). Task-centered Social Work. Aldershot: Ashgate.
- Marsh, Peter; Fisher, M (1986). In and out of Care. London: Batsford.
- Marsh, Peter; Trisetliots, J (1996). Prevention and Reunification in Child Care. London: Batsford.
- Marsh, P. (2002) "Task-centred work", in Davies, M. [ed.] The Blackwell Companion to Social Work, Second Edition Oxford: Blackwell. 106-113.
- Marsh, P (2006) "Promoting children's welfare by inter-professional practice and learning in social work and primary care" Social Work Education 25(2) 2006 pp148–160
- Marsh, P and Fisher, M. (2005) "Developing the Evidence Base for Social Work and Social Care Practice Report #10". Social Care Institute for Excellence, London. 2005
- Marsh, P. and Doel, M. (2005) The Task-centred Book, London: Routledge
- Fisher, M. and Marsh, P. (2003) "Social Work Research and the 2001 Research Assessment Exercise: an initial overview", Social Work Education 22(1) pp71–78
- Marsh, P. and Peel, M. (1999) Leaving Care in Partnership, Norwich: Stationery Office. [PDF File available with full findings]
- Marsh, P. and Crow, G. (1997) Family Group Conferences in Child Welfare, Oxford: Blackwell Science. [PDF File available with findings]
- The Development of Problem-Solving Knowledge for Social Care Practice British Journal of Social Work—Oxford Journals (online)
- The Development of Socially Skilled Practice: Social Skills Training in Social Work Education British Journal of Social Work—Oxford Journals (online)
