= Patricia Noxolo =

British geographer

Patricia Elaine Patten Noxolo
- Born: Birmingham
- Education: Nottingham Trent University; University of Manchester
- Scientific career
- Workplaces: University of Leicester; University of Birmingham
- Thesis: 'Dancing a yard, dancing abrard' : race, space and time in British development discourses. (1999)

Patricia Noxolo is a British geographer who is a professor at the University of Birmingham. She is the Chair of the Society for Caribbean Studies.

== Early life and education ==
Noxolo was born in Birmingham. She was an undergraduate student at the University of Manchester, where she studied French studies. She earned her doctorate at Nottingham Trent University, where she studied insecurity in Jamaican dancehall. She was a postdoctoral researcher at the University of Birmingham and the University of Leicester.

== Research and career ==
Noxolo was made a lecturer at the University of Birmingham in 2014. Her research considers postcolonial theories and cultural geography. In particular, she has focussed on British and Caribbean cultural practises. She led the Caribbean In/securities and Creativity (CARISCC) network, which was supported by Leverhulme Trust.

Noxolo was awarded the University of Birmingham teaching award in 2019. She was promoted to Professor in 2022.

== Selected publications ==
- Esson, James; Noxolo, Patricia; Baxter, Richard; Daley, Patricia; Byron, Margaret (7 August 2017). "The 2017 RGS-IBG chair's theme: decolonising geographical knowledges, or reproducing coloniality?". Area. 49 (3): 384–388. doi:10.1111/area.12371. ISSN 0004-0894.
- Noxolo, Patricia (7 August 2017). "Introduction: Decolonising geographical knowledge in a colonised and re-colonising postcolonial world". Area. 49 (3): 317–319. doi:10.1111/area.12370. ISSN 0004-0894.
- Madge, Clare; Raghuram, Parvati; Noxolo, Patricia (2009). "Engaged pedagogy and responsibility: A postcolonial analysis of international students". Geoforum. 40 (1): 34–45. doi:10.1016/j.geoforum.2008.01.008. hdl:2381/9577. ISSN 0016-7185.
