= British Psychological Society =

Learned society in the United Kingdom, devoted to psychology

- Abbreviation: BPS
- Formation: 1901; 125 years ago
- Type: Professional body, learned society, charity
- Legal status: Non-profit company
- Headquarters: St Andrews House, 48 Princess Road East, Leicester LE1 7DR
- Members: 60,604 (2019)
- President: Roman Raczka (2024–26)
- Chief Executive: Sarb Bajwa
- Honorary General Secretary: Christina Buxton
- Website: www.bps.org.uk

The British Psychological Society (BPS) is a representative body for psychologists and psychology in the United Kingdom.

== History ==
It was founded on 24 October 1901 at University College London (UCL) as The Psychological Society, the organisation initially admitted only recognised teachers in the field of psychology. The ten founder members were:

- Robert Armstrong-Jones
- Sophie Bryant
- W. R. Boyce Gibson
- Frank Noel Hales
- William McDougall
- Frederick Walker Mott
- W. H. R. Rivers
- Alexander Faulkner Shand
- William George Smith
- James Sully

Its current name of The British Psychological Society was taken in 1906 to avoid confusion with another group named The Psychological Society. Under the guidance of Charles Myers, membership was opened up to members of the medical profession in 1919. In 1941 the society was incorporated. In 1965 it was a granted a Royal charter.

== Organisation ==
The Society is both a learned and a professional body. As such it provides support and advice on research and practice issues. It is also a Registered Charity which imposes certain constraints on what it can and cannot do. For example, it cannot campaign on issues which are seen as party political. The BPS is not the statutory regulation body for Practitioner Psychologists in the UK which is the Health and Care Professions Council.

The Society has a large number of specialist and regional branches throughout the United Kingdom. It holds its Annual Conference, usually in May, in a different town or city each year. In addition, each of the sub-sections hold their own conferences and there is also a range of specialist meetings convened to consider relevant issues.

The Society is also a publishing body publishing a range of specialist journals, books and reports.

== Membership grades and post-nominals ==
In 2019 the BPS had 60,604 members and subscribers, in all fields of psychology, 20,243 of whom were Chartered Members. There are a number of grades of members:

- Members
  - Student member (no post-nominal): The grade for students of psychology.
  - Graduate Member (GMBPsS): Awarded to graduates of an undergraduate degree accredited by the society, or have completed an accredited conversion course.
  - Full Member (FMBPsS): awarded to those with qualification in psychology and working in the field of psychology
  - Associate Member (AMBPsS): awarded to wellbeing practitioners
- Fellows
  - Associate Fellow (AFBPsS): Associate Fellowship may be awarded to nominees who have satisfied one of the following conditions since first becoming eligible for graduate membership:

i) achieved eligibility for full membership of one of the society's divisions and been successfully engaged in the professional application of a specialised knowledge of psychology for an aggregate of at least two calendar years full-time (or its part-time equivalent); or
ii) possess a research qualification in psychology and been engaged in the application, discovery, development or dissemination of psychological knowledge or practice for an aggregate of at least four years full time (or its part time equivalent); or
iii) published psychological works or exercised specialised psychological knowledge of a standard not less than in 1 or 2 above.

  - Fellow (FBPsS): Fellowship may be awarded to nominees who have made an outstanding contribution to psychology (see Category:Fellows of the British Psychological Society) by satisfying the following criteria:

i) been engaged in work of a psychological nature (other than undergraduate training) for a total period of at least 10 years; and
ii) possess an advanced knowledge of psychology in at least one of its fields; and
iii) made an outstanding contribution to the advancement or dissemination of psychological knowledge or practice either by your own research, teaching, publications or public service, or by organising and developing the work of others.

  - Honorary Fellow (HonFBPsS): Honorary Fellowship is awarded for distinguished service in the field of psychology.

== Professional qualifications ==
- CPsychol: Chartered Psychologist - Following the receipt of a royal charter in 1965, the society became the keeper of the Register of Chartered Psychologists. The register was the means by which the Society could regulate the professional practice of psychology. Regulation included the awarding of practising certificates and the conduct of disciplinary proceedings. The register ceased to be when statutory regulation of psychologists began on 1 July 2009. The profession is now regulated by the Health and Care Professions Council. A member of the British Psychological Society (MBPsS) who has achieved chartered status has the right to the letters "CPsychol" after his or her name.
- CSci: Chartered Scientist - The Society is licensed by the Science Council for the registration of Chartered Scientists.
- EuroPsy: European Psychologist - The Society is a member of the European Federation of Psychologists' Associations (EFPA), and can award this designation to Chartered Psychologists.

== Response to the Cass Review ==
The Cass Review was published in April 2024, as an independent review of Gender Identity Services for Children and Young People, having been commissioned in 2020 by NHS England and NHS Improvement. It found, regarding medical interventions, a "lack of high-quality evidence", and it made a large number of recommendations, including those in the psychological area relevant to the BPS, including social transition, and conflicting clinical views between 'affirming care' versus 'exploratory care'.

In June 2024 the BPS issued an update to their "Guidelines for Psychologists Working with Gender, Sexuality and Relationship Diversity". An open letter criticising the BPS for not referring to the Cass Review in these guidelines was sent on 14 August to Professor Tony Lavender, Chair of the BPS Practice Board, by Pat Harvey, David Pilgrim and Peter Harvey, all BPS members and clinical psychologists. They state that the revised BPS guidelines: "represent an active barrier to much needed change in philosophy and practice for psychologists working in re-formed Gender Services in the immediate future".

However, the BPS has clarified that its updated guidelines did not refer to the Cass Review because these relate to adults, not children and young people. The BPS made this point on its website:

The purpose of this interim review was to assess the content in the guidance and update where necessary and appropriate. We know that the area of U18s and gender incongruence is a challenging and often highly politically charged one, which is why we have begun recruitment for the Task and Finish Group. We estimate this work will take approximately 18 months.

== Presidents ==
BPS Presidents from 1920 to the present
- 1920–1923 Charles Samuel Myers
- 1923–1926 Charles Edward Spearman
- 1926–1929 Francis Aveling
- 1929–1932 Beatrice Edgell
- 1932–1935 John Flügel
- 1935–1938 James Drever Sr.
- 1938–1941 Albert William Wolters
- 1941–1943 Cyril Burt
- 1943–1944 Tom Hatherley Pear
- 1944–1945 Millais Culpin
- 1945–1946 Godfrey Thomson
- 1946–1947 Robert John Bartlett
- 1947–1948 Charles Wilfred Valentine
- 1948–1949 Stanley J.F. Philpott
- 1949–1950 Robert Henry Thouless
- 1950–1951 Frederic Charles Bartlett
- 1951–1952 William Brown
- 1952–1953 Cecil Alec Mace
- 1953–1954 Arthur Rex Knight
- 1954–1955 Philip E. Vernon
- 1955–1956 Leslie S. Hearnshaw
- 1956–1957 Eric Benjamin Strauss
- 1957–1958 Alec Rodger
- 1958–1959 Magdalen Dorothea Vernon
- 1959–1960 Frederick Viggers Smith
- 1960–1961 James Drever Jr.
- 1961–1962 Edwin A. Peel
- 1962–1963 George C. Drew
- 1963–1964 Arthur Summerfield
- 1964–1965 Donald Eric Broadbent
- 1965–1966 George Westby
- 1966–1967 Grace Rawlings
- 1967–1968 George Seth
- 1968–1969 Boris Semeonoff
- 1969–1970 Robert John Audley
- 1970–1971 Harry Gwynne Jones
- 1971–1972 Harry Kay
- 1972–1973 Max Hamilton
- 1973–1974 Brian Malzard Foss
- 1974–1975 Oliver Louis Zangwill
- 1975–1976 Jack Tizard
- 1976–1977 May Alison Davidson
- 1977–1978 Alan Douglas Benson Clarke
- 1978–1979 Philip Marcus Levy
- 1979–1980 Peter H. Venables
- 1980–1981 Kevin J. Connolly
- 1981–1982 Derek Ernest Blackman
- 1982–1983 Ralph R. Hetherington
- 1983–1984 Halla Beloff
- 1984–1985 Charles Ian Howarth
- 1985–1986 Robert Maclaughlin Farr
- 1986–1987 David Legge
- 1987–1988 Lea S. Pearson
- 1988–1989 Anthony John Chapman
- 1989–1990 Maurice Anthony Gale
- 1990–1991 Peter Edwin Morris
- 1991–1992 Fraser Norman Watts
- 1992–1993 Edgar Miller
- 1993–1994 Ann Mary Colley
- 1994–1995 Geoffrey Anthony Lindsay
- 1995–1996 Stephen Edward Newstead
- 1996–1997 Margaret Valerie McAllister
- 1997–1998 Christopher Noel Cullen
- 1998–1999 Ingrid Cecilia Lunt
- 1999–2000 Patricia Frankish
- 2000–2001 Tommy MacKay
- 2001–2002 Vicki Bruce
- 2002–2003 Graham Davey
- 2003–2004 Alexander (Zander) Wedderburn
- 2004–2005 Ken Brown
- 2005–2006 Graham Powell
- 2006–2007 Ray Miller
- 2007–2008 Pam Maras
- 2008–2009 Elizabeth Campbell
- 2009–2010 Sue Gardner
- 2010–2011 Gerry Mulhern
- 2011–2012 Carole Allan
- 2012–2013 Peter Banister
- 2013–2014 Richard Mallows
- 2014–2015 Dorothy Miell
- 2015–2016 Jamie Hacker Hughes
- 2016–2017 Peter Kinderman
- 2017–2018 Nicola Gale
- 2018–2019 Kate Bullen
- 2019–2020 David Murphy
- 2020–2021 Hazel McLaughlin
- 2021–2022 Katherine Carpenter
- 2022–2024 Nicky Hayes
- 2024–2026 Roman Raczka
- 2026–2028 Laura Dean

== Honorary members and fellows ==
=== Honorary members ===
The following persons have been honorary members of the society:

- 1904 John Hughlings Jackson
- 1905 Harald Høffding, Sir Francis Galton, William James, Georg Elias Müller, Théodule Armand Ribot, Carl Stumpf
- 1910 James Sully
- 1911 Oswald Külpe
- 1912 Franz Brentano, James Ward
- 1926 Edward Claparède, Sigmund Freud, Gerardus Heymans, Pierre Janet, Henri Piéron, Edward Lee Thorndike, Edward Bradford Titchener, Hendrik Zwaardemaker
- 1927 Baron Albert Eduard Michotte van den Berck
- 1928 Mary Whiton Calkins
- 1932 James Rowland Angell, James McKeen Cattell, Sante de Sanctis, William Stern
- 1934 Havelock Ellis, Ernest Jones, Felix Krueger, William McDougall, Conwy Lloyd Morgan, Charles Samuel Myers, Alexander Faulkner Shand, Charles Edward Spearman, George Frederick William Stout
- 1937 Samuel Alexander, Henry Head, Charles Scott Sherrington
- 1940 Georges Dumas, Beatrice Edgell, Kurt Koffka, Carl Emil Seashore

In 1946 all surviving honorary members were made honorary fellows.

=== Honorary fellows ===
The following persons are or have been honorary fellows of the society:

- 1946 Carl Jung, Sir William Mitchell
- 1950 Gordon Allport, Clark L. Hull, David Katz, Wolfgang Köhler, Karl Lashley, Gardner Murphy, Lewis Terman, Louis Leon Thurstone
- 1952 Thomas Hunter
- 1954 Edgar Adrian, Edward C. Tolman, Robert S. Woodworth, Jean Piaget, Edwin Boring, Cyril Burt, Frederic Bartlett, Donald O. Hebb, Ernst Kretschmer
- 1955 Albert William Wolters
- 1958 May Smith, Melanie Klein, Agostino Gemelli, Alexander Luria, Tom Hatherley Pear, Charles Wilfred Valentine, Henry Tasman Lovell
- 1959 Henry Cohen, 1st Baron Cohen of Birkenhead
- 1960 Ernest Hilgard, Roger Russell
- 1961 Russell Brain, 1st Baron Brain
- 1962 George Humphrey, B. F. Skinner, Robert H. Thouless
- 1963 Otto Klineberg, Robert John Bartlett
- 1965 Anna Freud, Cecil Alec Mace
- 1966 Aubrey Lewis, Robert Robertson Rusk, Fred Schonell
- 1967 Lionel Penrose
- 1968 Neal E. Miller, Erwin Stengel
- 1970 Edward George Glover, Tony Giffard, 3rd Earl of Halsbury, Magdalen Dorothea Vernon
- 1972 Raymond Bernard Cattell, Harry Harlow, Henry Murray
- 1974 Michael Fordham
- 1977 James J. Gibson, Eleanor J. Gibson
- 1978 Michael Rutter, Philip E. Vernon
- 1979 Desmond Pond
- 1981 Robert Hinde
- 1982 Oliver Zangwill
- 1984 Jerome Bruner
- 1985 Noam Chomsky
- 1986 Donald Broadbent
- 1988 Herbert A. Simon
- 1989 George Armitage Miller
- 1990 Jack Davies
- 1991 Elizabeth Loftus
- 1992 Michael Argyle
- 1993 Margaret Donaldson, Klaus Werner Wedell
- 1994 Ulric Neisser, Freda Gladys Newcombe
- 1995 Alan Baddeley, Patrick Rabbitt
- 1997 Victoria Bruce, John Morton, Peter B. Warr
- 1998 Heinz Rudolph Schaffer
- 1999 Antony John Chapman
- 2000 Richard Gregory
- 2001 Maurice Anthony Gale
- 2003 Miles R.C. Hewstone
- 2005 Andy Young
- 2006 Uta Frith, William Yule, Glynis M. Breakwell
- 2007 Alan D.B. Clarke, Ann M. Clarke, Hannah Steinberg
- 2008 David Canter
- 2009 David M. Clark
- 2010 Raymond Henry Charles Bull, Cary Lynn Cooper
- 2011 James Orford, John Weinman, Marie Johnston
- 2012 Dianne Berry, David P. Farrington, Glyn W. Humphreys, Annette Karmiloff-Smith, Peter Saville
- 2013 Saths Cooper
- 2014 Dorothy V. M. Bishop
- 2016 Erica Burman, Wendy Hollway
- 2017 Carolyn Kagan, Michael Murray, John Oates
- 2018 Anne Colley
- 2019 Michael Berger, Martin Fisher, Ruth Mann, Ray Miller, Jill Wilkinson
- 2020 Jonathan A. Smith
- 2021 Steve Reicher, Elizabeth Stokoe
- 2023 Lucy Johnstone
- 2024 Maggie Snowling, Emmy van Deurzen
- 2025 Ann Phoenix

== Society publications ==
=== Journals ===
The BPS publishes 12 journals:

- British Journal of Clinical Psychology
- British Journal of Developmental Psychology
- British Journal of Educational Psychology
- British Journal of Health Psychology
- British Journal of Mathematical and Statistical Psychology
- British Journal of Psychology
- British Journal of Social Psychology
- Journal of Neuropsychology
- Journal of Occupational and Organizational Psychology
- Legal and Criminological Psychology
- Psychology and Psychotherapy: Theory, Research and Practice
- Environmental Psychology Research

=== The Psychologist ===
The Psychologist is the monthly magazine of the British Psychological #society. It provides a forum for communication and discussion among all members of the society and beyond, and helps promote the advancement and diffusion of knowledge of psychology, pure and applied.

The Psychologist is read by more than 40,000 members in print, and the website – which runs a significant amount of online-only content – reaches millions of users each year.

The Psychologist is also available in app form, with extras such as author-narrated audio for BPS members. On social media, the focus is a Bluesky presence.

The Psychologist was launched in 1988, incorporating the existing Bulletin of the British Psychological Society. A full archive is available.

The Psychologist (both in print and online) also incorporates the British Psychological Society’s Research Digest, launched in 2003 to provide journalistic, accessible summaries of new peer-reviewed research. The Research Digest is also available to all as a weekly email, and has an associated podcast PsychCrunch.

Dr Jon Sutton took up the role of Editor of The Psychologist in March 2000, coming from a psychology lectureship at Glasgow Caledonian University. His official title now is Head of Science Communication, reflecting broader efforts to tell ‘stories of Psychology’ that have included a regular presence at Latitude Festival.

=== Books ===
The Society publishes a series of textbooks in collaboration with Wiley-Blackwell. These cover most of the core areas of psychology.

== Member networks: Sections, divisions, branches and groups ==
The British Psychological Society currently has ten divisions and nineteen sections. Divisions and sections differ in that the former are open to practitioners in a certain field of psychology, so professional and qualified psychologists only will be entitled to full membership of a division, whereas the latter are interest groups comprising members of the BPS who are interested in a particular academic aspect of psychology.

=== Divisions ===
The divisions include:

- Division of Academics, Researchers and Teachers in Psychology
- Division of Clinical Psychology
- Division of Coaching Psychology
- Division of Counselling Psychology
- Division of Educational and Child Psychology
- Division of Forensic Psychology
- Division of Health Psychology
- Division of Neuropsychology
- Division of Occupational Psychology
- Division of Sport and Exercise Psychology
- Scottish Division of Educational Psychology

The Division of Clinical Psychology is the largest division within the BPS – it is subdivided into thirteen faculties:

- Addiction
- Children, Young People and their Families
- Clinical Health Psychology
- Eating Disorders
- Forensic Clinical Psychology
- HIV and Sexual Health
- Holistic Psychology
- Leadership and Management
- Intellectual Disabilities
- Oncology and Palliative Care
- Perinatal Psychology
- Psychosis and Complex Mental Health
- Psychology of Older People

=== Sections ===
The Sections currently include:

Sections	
Cognitive Psychology	Formed in 1978 as a national forum for the discussion of research and issues of professional concern to cognitive psychologists. Activities include an Annual Conference, usually held in September started in 1984, one or more specialist events in the year and symposia at the main Society Conference in March/April. An award scheme started in 1992 with first award winner in 1993 Neil Burgess and Graham Hitch.
Community Psychology	Established in 2010, it aims to bring together psychologists and others who work to dismantle disabling societal barriers and construct psychologically enabling contexts and practices, address people's strengths and competencies as well as problems and difficulties, challenge the dominance of individually-focused models of psychosocial adjustment and psychological intervention promote preventative interventions for health and well-being, raise awareness of socio-political and organisational issues affecting education, development and well-being and strive for social justice. Its members work in solidarity and mutual respect alongside people experiencing marginalisation, disempowerment and oppression.
Consciousness and Experiential Psychology	Initiated in 1994 by Jane Henry, Max Velmans, John Pickering, Elizabeth Valentine and Richard Stevens, the section promoted and supported the reincorporation of consciousness studies into mainstream psychology. Official approval was announced in 1997. The section's mission is ‘to advance our understanding of consciousness, to bring scientific research on consciousness closer to other traditions of inquiry into the nature of mind, and to explore how this research can be used to improve the quality of life’. Every year in September the Section holds its annual conference, and smaller workshops and events at other times.
Crisis, Disaster and Trauma Psychology	Formed in 2013 with the goal of creating a 'centre of excellence' in which the concept of psychological trauma can be explored, evidence-based treatments examined, research findings shared and best practice established.
Cyberpsychology	The section exists to pursue and formalise a scientific understanding of the impact, dynamic processes and outcomes that democratised digital technologies have enabled in individuals, groups and the wider society. It promotes research into issues around gaming, social media, virtual reality, online learning and virtual interest groups, we hope to raise (and answer) questions about the motivations, experiences, and effects surrounding the interactions between humanity and technology.
Defence and Security Psychology	The section exists to provide a forum for those involved in government work on the security of our transport networks, in academic and clinical investigation of mental health in our Armed and Security forces and everything in between.
Developmental Psychology	Founded in 1972, the Developmental Section is one of the largest of the British Psychological Society's sections. It has a mission to promote high-quality research into developmental psychology and generally to raise the profile of British developmental research in an international arena. These aims are pursued in various ways, including through the British Journal of Developmental Psychology. The journal has a history covering seminal work on children's drawing, imagination, communication, attachment, reasoning, theory of mind, developmental disorders (including autism). The annual conference for the section is usually held in early September.
History and Philosophy of Psychology	This is an interdisciplinary section that brings together psychologists, historians and philosophers. It is interested in both the history of psychology and the philosophy of psychology. It is in the dialogue between the two that the most is to be gained in terms of looking back, assessing the present and moving forward.
Male Psychology	The Section aims to expand our understanding of the full diversity of the human condition on an inclusive basis by enriching our knowledge of men and boys alongside women and girls, both in their differences and in their common humanity.
Mathematical, Statistical and Computing	The primary aim of the Section is to provide an opportunity for those interested in mathematical (including computational), statistical (including quantitative and mixed methods approaches) and computing (including algorithmic, HCI and cyber-psych) related issues in psychology to exchange ideas and promote the discussion of these interests.
Political Psychology	This section provides a forum for those interested in psychological aspects of everyday politics in the workplace, community or home, or national or international politics
Psychobiology	The Psychobiology Section provides a forum for the discussion and professional issues for people with interests in the more biological aspects of psychology.
Psychology of Education	Its aims are to offer advice to the Society on matters related to psychological aspects of education and the training of teachers; to promote the study and discussion of psychology in education; to provide a forum for the discussion and exchange of ideas among those interested in the psychological aspects of education; and to stimulate research into matters related to the psychological aspects of education
Psychology of Sexualities	Established in 1998, as the Lesbian & Gay Psychology section, after nearly a decade of campaigning and three rejected proposals (two for a Psychology of Lesbianism Section and one for a Lesbian & Gay Psychology Section). Founding members of the section include Celia Kitzinger and Sue Wilkinson. In 2009, the section changed its name to the Psychology of Sexualities Section in recognition that the work and interests of its members also applied to bisexuality, queer identities and heterosexualities. The Section is for psychologists whose work is relevant to lesbian, gay, bisexual, trans and queer (LGBTQ) issues. It is open to all BPS members including both practitioner and academic psychologists. Although trans issues could more accurately be described as belonging to a psychology of gender, trans issues are typically included under the umbrella of lesbian, gay, bisexual, trans and queer (LGBTQ) psychology and is therefore aligned with the section's remit. The section works with equivalent sections of other psychological organisations through the International Psychology Network for Lesbian, Gay, Bisexual, Trans and Intersex Issues (IPsyNET). Members of the section have played an important role in drafting the BPS Guidelines and literature review for psychologists working therapeutically with sexual and gender minority clients; section members were also instrumental in drafting the Society's Position Statement on Therapies attempting to Change Sexual Orientation; a UK Consensus Statement on Conversion Therapy; and a Memorandum on Conversion Therapy in the UK. The section publishes Psychology of Sexualities Review (previously the Lesbian and Gay Psychology Review), organises events and training and awards prizes for achievement in the field.
Psychology of Women and Equalities	Originally founded in 1988 as The Psychology of Women Section, the modern version of POWES works to encourage psychological research which challenges negative assumptions about minority groups and which challenges processes of exclusion, marginalisation and oppression in fields of study and practice, while also maintaining a strong inter-disciplinary focus, seeking to work and build inclusive alliances across disciplines. The main aims of the Psychology of Women and Equalities Section are to address gender issues and inequalities in the psychology curriculum; to facilitate and develop feminist and emancipatory research, theory and practice; and to influence public policy in areas such as equal rights, parenting, and employment.
Psychotherapy	The aims of the Section are to further psychological understanding of the personal, social and cultural issues involved in psychotherapy and to examine critically and elaborate their meanings for the psychology of human experience and conduct;to promote scientific investigation of psychotherapy which employs research paradigms appropriate to its subject matter; and to provide a forum for the discussion and exchange of ideas in relation to the above which avoids aligning itself with any school within the broad discipline of psychotherapy
Qualitative Methods in Psychology	The Section aims to act as a network of qualified psychologists, extending collaboration possibilities, sharing expertise and offering training opportunities to members; to champion and develop qualitative methods in psychology and to raise the profile of teaching and research of qualitative methods in psychology.
Social Psychology	The Section aims to encourage and promote social psychological research, facilitate contact and communication between social psychologists and impact positively upon social psychology globally
Transpersonal Psychology	The Section acts as a forum for those interested in spiritual practices and experiences, researching their value and their relationship to the models and concepts of psychology

Note: The term 'division' in the American Psychological Association does not have the same meaning as it does in the British Psychological Society, coming closer to what the British Psychological Society refers to as 'sections'. Branches are for members in the same geographical region.

=== Special groups ===
BPS currently has the following special groups to provide a forum for members working in particular specialist fields, with a particular focus on training, practice, and professional development

Special Groups	
Special Group in Coaching Psychology	Re-designated as Division in 2021
Special Group for Independent Practitioners	
Special Group for Psychology and Social Care	

=== Regional Branches ===
The Society also organises regional branches throughout the United Kingdom. These include the following branches:

- East Midlands Branch
- East of England Branch
- London and Home Counties Branch
- North East of England Branch
- North West of England Branch
- Northern Ireland Branch
- Scottish Branch
- South West of England Branch
- Welsh Branch
- Wessex Branch
- West Midlands Branch

== Statutory regulation ==
BPS has been concerned with the question of statutory registration of psychologists since the 1930s. It received its charter in 1965 and an amendment in 1987 which allowed it to maintain a register of psychologists. The UK government announced its intention to widen statutory regulation, to include inter alia psychologists, following a number of scandals arising in the 1990s in the psychotherapy field. The BPS was in favour of statutory regulation, but opposed the proposed regulator, the Health Professions Council (HPC), preferring the idea of a new Psychological Professions Council which would map quite closely onto its own responsibilities. The government resisted this, however, and in June 2009, under the Health Care and Associated Professions (Miscellaneous Amendments) Order, regulation of most of the psychology professions passed to the HCPC, the renamed Health and Care Professions Council.

== Society offices ==
The Society's main office is currently in Leicester in the United Kingdom. According to BPS HR department, as of April 2019 there were 113 staff members at the Leicester office, 9 in London. There are also smaller regional offices in Belfast, Cardiff, Glasgow. The archives are deposited at the Wellcome Library in the Euston Road, London.

== Logo and YouTube ==
The British Psychological Society's logo is an image of the Greek mythical figure Psyche, personification of the soul, holding an oil lamp. The use of her image is a reference to the origins of the word psychology. The lamp symbolises learning and is also a reference to the story of Psyche. Eros was in love with Psyche and would visit her at night, but had forbidden her from finding out his identity. She was persuaded by her jealous sisters to discover his identity by holding a lamp to his face as he slept. Psyche accidentally burnt him with oil from the lamp, and he awoke and flew away.

The Society has its own YouTube channel.

== See also ==
- Association for Psychological Science
- BPS Barbara Wilson Lifetime Achievement Award
- List of psychologists
- Presidents' Award
- Spearman Medal
