= Christopher Cullen (disambiguation) =

Christopher Cullen (born 1946) is an English sinologist.

Christopher Cullen may also refer to:

- Christopher Noel Cullen, British psychologist
- Christopher M. Cullen (born 1962), American philosopher
