= Nikki Hayes (disambiguation) =

Nikki Hayes or Nicky Hayes may be:

- Nikki Hayes, Irish DJ
- Nikki Hayes (singer), American singer
- Nicky Hayes, British psychologist
