= Robert Bartlett =

Robert Bartlett may refer to:

- Robert Bartlett (surgeon) (1939–2025), American physician who has made significant contributions to ECMO technology
- Robert Bartlett (explorer) (1875–1946), Newfoundland Arctic explorer
- Robert Bartlett (historian) (born 1950), English medievalist and television presenter
- Rob Bartlett (born 1957), American comedian, actor and writer
- Rob Bartlett (cricketer) (born 1972), Australian cricketer
- Bob Bartlett (1904–1968), U.S. senator from Alaska
- Robert Bartlett (rugby league) (1927–2010), Australian rugby league footballer
- Robert V. Bartlett (fl. 1980s–2020s), American political scientist
- Robert John Bartlett (1879–1980), British psychologist
