= Edgar Miller =

Edgar Miller may refer to:

- Edgar Miller (American football) (1901–1991), American football player
- Edgar Miller (artist) (1899–1993), American artist
- Edgar Miller (psychologist) (1939–2015), British psychologist
