= Boris Semeonoff =

Psychologist

- Born: Boris Semeonoff; St. Petersburg (Leningrad)
- Education: University of Edinburgh
- Scientific career
- Fields: Psychology, Personality psychology
- Workplaces: University of Edinburgh
- Thesis: A review of work done on Weber's law as applied to the intensity of sound (1936)

Boris Semeonoff (1910-1998) was a British psychologist with particular expertise in personality assessment.

== Career ==
Semeonoff was born in St. Petersburg, Russia but moved to Scotland when he was only four. The visit was intended as a holiday but with the outbreak of war he did not return to Russia. He was a student at George Watson's College, Edinburgh followed by the University of Edinburgh where he obtained an MA (Hons) in English Language and Literature (1931) followed by a B.Ed (1933). After the departure of George Seth, he was appointed to the staff of the Department of Psychology at the university and was subsequently awarded a Ph.D. (1936) for a thesis on Weber's Law in relation to the intensity of sound.

From 1933 until his retirement in 1980, Semeonoff worked at the university rising to the position of Reader of Psychology. During the Second World War, he was involved in the selection of officers for the Special Operations Executive.

He was actively involved in the British Psychological Society becoming its president in 1966. He edited the British Journal of Psychology between 1958 and 1964.

== Research ==
His research was largely in the area of personality assessment and selection and he published several books on the subject (Semeonoff, 1958, 1970, 1976). His papers are held in the University of Edinburgh Archives.

== Honours ==
- 1968 - 1969 - President, British Psychological Society
- President, Psychology Section, British Association for the Advancement of Science
- Honorary Life Member, British Psychological Society

== Publications ==
- Semeonoff, B. (1958). Diagnostic Performance Tests.
- Semeonoff, B. (ed)(1970). Personality Assessment: Selected readings.
- Semeonoff, B. (1976). Projective Techniques
