= Cecil Alec Mace =

British philosopher and psychologist (1894–1971)

- Born: 22 July 1894; Norwich, England
- Died: 7 June 1971 (aged 76)
- Occupations: Philosopher, industrial psychologist

Cecil Alec Mace (22 July 1894 – 7 June 1971), usually cited as C. A. Mace, was a British philosopher and industrial psychologist. He is best known for his work on monetary incentives and goal-setting theory.

== Life ==
Mace was born on 22 July 1894 to Mary and Walter Mace in Norwich, England. He left home at 18 for Cambridge University, intending to study for holy orders. However, instead he chose to read Moral Sciences at Queens' College, Cambridge. He studied under the philosopher G. E. Moore. The British psychologist Charles Samuel Myers, who started the first experimental psychology laboratory in Cambridge, was another mentor.

At Cambridge Mace became a pacifist and as a conscientious objector during World War I, spent time at Wormwood Scrubs and Dartmoor.

Following the war, he was appointed Lecturer in Philosophy and Psychology at the University of Nottingham. He married Marjorie Lebus in 1922 and they had two sons.

In 1925, he joined St Andrews University to start an experimental psychology laboratory. He introduced the first courses in experimental psychology and set up a laboratory in 1927.

In 1932, he became a Reader a Bedford College, London. He worked under the direction of Professor Beatrice Edgell, the first woman President of the British Psychological Society.

During World War II, Mace was appointed a Head of Psychology at King's College, London. The department was transferred to Birkbeck College in 1944 and Mace became the first Birkbeck Chair of Psychology, a position he retired from in 1961.

Mace died on 9 June 1971.

== Influence ==
Mace's work on Incentives: Some Experimental Studies (1935) discredited the notion that workers are primarily incentivized by money. He also stated that people have a "will to work." In 1935, he conducted the first empirical studies of goal setting. His most influential books were Sibylla; or the Revival of Prophecy and The Psychology of Study.

== Awards and honours ==
- President of the Aristotelian Society, 1948-9
- President of the Psychological Section, British Association, 1951
- President of the British Psychological Society, 1952–53

== Works ==
- (1926) Sibylla; or, the Revival of Prophecy.
- (1929) A Manual of Psychology.
- (1932) The psychology of study. London: Methuen & Co. Ltd. 1968. viii, 96. LCCN 33024188. OCLC 6654937.
- (1933) The Principles of Logic. An introductory survey.
- (1937) Supernormal Faculty and the Structure of the Mind.
- (1953) Current Trends in British Psychology. Edited by C. A. Mace and P. E. Vernon.
- (1954) The Psychological Approach to Scientific Management - can this be applied in the home?
- (1957) British Philosophy in the Mid-Century. A Cambridge symposium. Edited by C. A. Mace.
- (1973) Selected papers.

=== Papers ===
- "Representation and Expression". Analysis: 33–38. March 1934.
- "Metaphysics and Emotive Language". Analysis. 2 (1/2): 6–10. October 1934.
