= Brian Foss =

Brian Foss may refer to:

- Brian Foss (psychologist) (1921–1997), British psychologist
- Brian Foss (art historian) (born 1955), Canadian art historian, academic, and curator
