= Westby =

Westby may refer to:

== Places ==
=== England ===
- Westby, Lancashire
- Westby, Lincolnshire

=== U.S.A. ===
- Westby, Montana
- Westby, North Dakota
- Westby, Wisconsin

=== Australia ===
- Westby, New South Wales

== People ==
- George Westby (died 1984?), British psychologist
- Jim Westby (born 1937), American ice hockey player
- Wardell Westby (died 1756), British politician
- Edward Westby Donovan (1821–1897), British Army commander
- Finn Michael Westby Caspersen (1941–2009), American financier
- Westby James Davoren (1928–2010), Australian politician
- Westby Perceval (1854–1928), New Zealand politician
