= William Yule =

William Yule may refer to:

- Billy Yule (born 1954), American musician
- William Yule (psychologist) (1940–2023), British psychologist and professor of applied child psychology
