= Kinderman =

Kinderman is a surname. Notable people with the surname include:

- Keith Kinderman (1940–2018), American football player
- Peter Kinderman (born 1965), British psychologist
- William Kinderman (born 1952), American author and music scholar
- Edwin Kinderman (1916-2018), American chemist

== See also ==
- Jonathan Kindermans (born 1994), Belgian footballer
- Kindermann
