= Albert Wolters =

Albert Wolters may refer to:

- Albert M. Wolters (born 1942), professor of religion
- Albert William Wolters (1893–1961), British psychologist
