= Charles Valentine =

Charles Valentine may refer to:

- Charles James Valentine (1837–1900), English ironmaster and politician
- Charles L. Valentine (1846–1925), member of the Wisconsin State Assembly
- Charles Wilfred Valentine (1879–1964), British educationalist and psychologist

== See also ==
- Charles-Valentin Alkan (1813–1888), French composer.
- Charlie Valentine, 2009 crime drama film
