= Stanley J.F. Philpott =

Australian-British psychologist

Stanley John Francis Philpott
- Born: 1888
- Died: 1952 (aged 63–64)
- Education: University of London
- Scientific career
- Fields: Psychology, psychometrics

Stanley John Francis Philpott (1888–1952) was a British psychologist and educator.

Philpott trained as a teacher in Exeter and spent many years in the teaching profession. He also conducted research on mental efficiency which involved the administration of a range of intelligence tests he developed and their measurement over time. In 1932, he was awarded a DSc by the University of London for this work. The findings were published in a monograph of the British Journal of Psychology. Twenty years later there was further discussion about his work in an issue of that journal.

Philpott was for many years Treasurer and then President of the British Psychological Society. He ensured that the growing society was on a clear financial basis and also convinced the British Board of Trade that the name which the Society had held for 25 years should be formally registered. He also served on the boards of the British Association for the Advancement of Science.

== Honours ==
- President, British Psychological Society, 1959–60
