= Maurice Anthony Gale =

British psychologist

Maurice Anthony (Tony) Gale (1937–2006) was a British psychologist.

== Career ==
Gale studied psychology at the University of Exeter, and subsequently held lectureships at the Universities of Exeter and of Swansea as well as at UWIST (Cardiff). He was appointed to a chair in Psychology at the University of Southampton where he also held the post of Dean of Social Sciences. He then moved to the University of Portsmouth as Director of Research and Development in the Department of Psychology.

Gale's principal research was the use of EEG to measure brain activity during information processing and during social interaction. He also studied personality correlates of brain function.

Gale was very active in the British Psychological Society and held a variety of posts including President, Honorary General Secretary, Chair of the Scientific Affairs Board and of the Qualifying Examination Board.

He was Chief Examiner (Psychology) for the International Baccalaureate and was Secretary/Treasurer in the Association of Learned Societies in the Social Sciences (ALSISS).

== Awards ==
- 1980 - Life Member, British Psychological Society
- 2001 - Honorary Fellow, British Psychological Society
- 2002 - Award for Distinguished Contributions to Teaching of Psychology
- 2003 - Academician, Learned Societies for the Social Sciences
