= Elizabeth Campbell (psychologist) =

British psychologist (1954-2010)

- Born: 1954; Glasgow, Scotland
- Died: 2010 (aged 55–56)
- Education: University of Edinburgh, University of Oxford
- Scientific career
- Fields: Clinical psychology
- Workplaces: University of Surrey, University of Glasgow

Elizabeth Campbell (1954–2010) was a clinical psychologist from Scotland, head of both the British Psychological Society, and also the European Federation of Psychology Associations. She was a specialist in developing training in clinical psychology.

== Life ==
Liz Campbell was born in Glasgow, Scotland, in 1954 where she graduated from the University of Edinburgh. After training in clinical psychology she completed a PhD on depression among women at the University of Oxford (1985). She then taught at the University of Surrey for some years before returning to Scotland, this time to the University of Glasgow where she became Head of the Section of Psychological Medicine and led the development of the Doctorate in Clinical Psychology.

She was active in the British Psychological Society, of which he was elected president in 2008, and also the European Federation of Psychology Associations.

== Awards ==
- 2008 - 2009 - President, British Psychological Society
- 2009 - Secretary General, European Federation of Psychologists' Associations
