= Harry Gwynne Jones =

British psychologist (1918–1985)

H. Gwynne Jones
- Born: Horace Gwynne Jones; 1918
- Died: 1985 (aged 66–67); Swansea, Wales
- Education: University of London
- Scientific career
- Fields: Psychology
- Workplaces: University of Leeds; St. George's Hospital Medical School

H. Gwynne Jones (1918–1985) was a British psychologist with particular expertise in personality assessment.

== Career ==
Jones obtained a BSc (Hons) in botany from the University of London. With the outbreak of war he enlisted in the Fleet Air Arm. After the war he returned to Wales to teach botany but he moved to London to obtain another BSc, this time in Psychology. He followed this with training in clinical psychology at the Institute of Psychiatry under the supervision of Monte B. Shapiro.

He remained at the Institute for twelve years before moving to St. George's Hospital Medical School to establish a department of psychology. In 1968 he was appointed Chair of Psychology at the University of Leeds where he remained until he retired in 1981.

He was actively involved in the British Psychological Society and was Honorary General Secretary in 1962 becoming its president in 1966. He was also a humanist, who spoke on the importance of rationalism at the annual dinner of the Rationalist Press Association in 1971.

== Research ==
His research was largely in the area of developing methods in clinical psychology.

== Honours ==
- 1966–1967 - President, British Psychological Society
- 1984 - Honorary Fellowship, Royal College of Psychiatrists
