= Lea S. Pearson =

British psychologist (1942–1995)

Lea Pearson
- Born: 1942
- Died: 1995 (aged 52–53)
- Education: University of Hull
- Scientific career
- Fields: Educational psychology
- Workplaces: University of Nottingham

Lea Pearson (1942 - 1995) was an educational psychologist who played an important role in developing training in educational psychology in Britain.

== Life ==
Lea Pearson graduated in psychology from the University of Hull followed by teacher training. After teaching in Birmingham, she moved to Manchester where she completed the training in educational psychology. She worked as an educational psychologist in Lancashire before becoming Principal Educational Psychologist for the City of Birmingham in 1980. She was awarded a special professorship of Applied Psychology by the University of Nottingham.

She was active in the British Psychological Society, of which she was elected president in 1988. She was only the second educational psychologist to hold this position.

== Publications ==
- Pearson, L. (1988). Conductive education. The Psychologist.
- Pearson, L., & Tweddle, D. (1984). The formulation and use of behavioural objectives. In D. Fontana (ed) Behaviourism and learning theory in education. Edinburgh: Scottish Academic Press.

== Awards ==
- 1987 - 1988 - President, British Psychological Society
