= Journal of Neuropsychology =

- Discipline: Neuropsychology
- Language: English
- Edited by: Martin Edwards (Université catholique de Louvain)

Publication details
- History: 2007-present
- Publisher: The British Psychological Society (United Kingdom)
- Frequency: Biannual
- Impact factor: 2.468 (2018)

Standard abbreviations
- ISO 4: J. Neuropsychol.

Indexing
- ISSN: 1748-6653

Links
- Journal homepage

The Journal of Neuropsychology is a biannual peer-reviewed scientific journal covering clinical and research studies across neurology, psychology and psychiatry. It is published by The British Psychological Society. The editor-in-chief is Martin Gareth Edwards (Université catholique de Louvain).

It is abstracted and indexed by Academic Search Alumni Edition, Academic Search Complete, PubMed, PsycINFO, Science Citation Index Expanded, SCOPUS, Social Sciences Citation Index, and Web of Science.

In 2018, it had a Social Sciences Citation Index impact factor of 2.468.
