= Journal of Mental Health =

- Discipline: mental health
- Language: English
- Edited by: Til Wykes

Publication details
- History: March 1992-
- Publisher: Taylor & Francis (U.K.)
- Frequency: bi-monthly
- Open access: No

Standard abbreviations
- ISO 4: J. Ment. Health

Indexing
- ISSN: 0963-8237 (print); 1360-0567 (web)
- OCLC no.: 288963954

Links
- Journal homepage

Journal of Mental Health is a bi-monthly journal established in March 1992 by Ray Hodgson (University of Wales College of Medicine, Centre of Applied Public Health Medicine, Cardiff). In 2002, Til Wykes became the Executive Editor and has continued in that role until the present time.

For the first three years it was published quarterly, with five editions in 1995 and 1996 before settling on a bi-monthly issue cycle.

The first flyer for the journal stated in 1990 that "we have no intention of adding to the multitude of lightly thumbed, tenuously relevant and uninteresting journals accumulating in our libraries and on our bookshelves". Instead, they wanted to publish "work which will have a direct impact upon our daily clinical practice, which is thought-provoking and which challenges assumptions and methods in mental health".

The journal was mentioned 82 times in 2003 Cases for Change document published by National Institute for Mental Health in England.
