= Antony John Chapman =

British psychologist and university administrator

Antony John Chapman OBE (1947–2022) was a British psychologist and university administrator.

== Career ==
Chapman was awarded a PhD by the University of Leicester. He was then appointed as a lecturer at the University of Wales Institute of Science and Technology. In 1983 he moved to the University of Leeds as Professor of Psychology and Head of Department where he was promoted to Dean of Science and Pro-Vice-Chancellor.

In 1998, he was appointed Vice-Chancellor of the University of Wales Institute, Cardiff. He was editor of the British Journal of Psychology and editor-in-chief/editor of Current Psychology.

== Awards ==
- Honorary Fellow British Psychological Society
- Academician/Fellow Academy of Social Sciences
- Hon DSc, University of Leicester
- OBE, services to education

== Positions ==
- President, Psychology Section of the British Association for the Advancement of Science
- President, British Psychological Society
- Fellow, UK Academy of Social Sciences
