= Christopher Noel Cullen =

British psychologist

Christopher Cullen
- Born: Christopher Noel Cullen; December 1949; Manchester
- Education: Bangor University
- Scientific career
- Fields: Psychology, Clinical psychology
- Workplaces: St. Andrew's University; Keele University
- Thesis: Schedule control of temporally based behaviour (1975)
- Doctoral advisor: Peter Harzem

Christopher Noel Cullen (born 1949) is a British psychologist who specialised in the field of learning disability.

== Life ==
Cullen completed his PhD at Bangor University which at that time was the centre of radical behaviourism and its application to clinical issues. He recalls meeting with B.F. Skinner in London at that time. After working for a short period as a research assistant he trained in clinical psychology and developed an expertise in working with people with learning disabilities. He was appointed to the Chair of Learning Disabilities at St. Andrew's University and then, in 1995, moved to Keele University as both Professor of Clinical Psychology and Clinical Director for Psychological Therapies for North Staffordshire. He retired as emeritus Professor of Clinical Psychology.

He was active in the British Psychological Society, of which he was the Chief National Assessor. He was elected President of the Society in 1997. His presidential address was on the topic of behaviour analysis in work and therapy. He was also elected President of the British Association for Behavioural and Cognitive Psychotherapies.

== Work ==
His clinical work focused on Acceptance and Commitment Therapy, one of the 'third wave' cognitive therapies arising out of radical behaviourism.

== Awards ==
- Lifetime Achievement Award, British Psychological Society
- Honorary Fellow, British Association for Behavioural and Cognitive Psychotherapies

== Position ==
- 1997-1998: President, British Psychological Society
- 2005-2006: President, British Association for Behavioural and Cognitive Psychotherapies

== Publications ==
- Cullen, C. (1991). Ethics and clinical practise : a behavioural analysis. In P. J. Barker and S. Baldwin (Eds.). Ethical Issues in Mental Health. London: Chapman Hall.
- Cullen, C. (1992). Staff training and management for intellectual disability services. International Review of Research in Mental Retardation, 18, 225–245.
- Cullen, C. (1996). Challenging behaviour and intellectual disability : Assessment, analysis and treatment. British Journal of Clinical Psychology, 35, 153–156.
- Cullen, C. (1998). The trouble with rules : behaviour analysis in work and therapy. The Psychologist, 11, 471–475.
- Cullen, C. (1999). Contextualism in intellectual disability research: the case of choice behaviour. Journal of Intellectual Disability Research, 43, pp 00–00.
- Cullen, C., Brown, J.F., Combes, H., & Hendy, S. (1999). Working with people who have intellectual impairments. In J. Marzillier & J. Hall (Eds.). What is Clinical Psychology (3rd edition).
- Cullen, C. & Mappin, R. (1998). An examination of the effects of gentle teaching on people with complex learning disabilities and challenging behaviour. British Journal of Clinical Psychology, 37, 199–211.
