= Peter Kinderman =

British psychologist (born 1965)

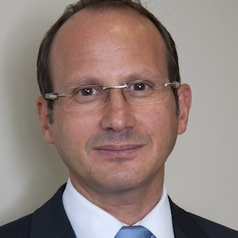
Peter Kinderman

Peter Kinderman (born 1965) is a professor of Clinical Psychology, and a Chartered Clinical Psychologist in independent practice. He works via KinderMedia, supporting the broadcast industries and providing psychological consultancy and media‐related work. He is registered with the Health and Care Professions Council (HCPC). He was formerly Professor of Clinical Psychology at the University of Liverpool and held senior academic roles there and at the University of Manchester.

== Early life and education ==
Kinderman was born in Sussex, and attended King's College, Cambridge as an undergraduate. He then worked at St James’ Hospital Leeds, before professional training in Clinical Psychology at the University of Leeds, and a PhD at the University of Liverpool.

== Career ==
After leaving his academic appointment at the University of Liverpool, Kinderman is now a founding Director of Kinder Media., which provides psychological consultancy for productions, journalists and media organisations. He works with the former mental health lead for the BBC, Julie Freeborn with whom he aspires to provide a formal training route for mental health professionals working in the media. This followed their award-winning collaboration with BBC and ITV to create the first ever training for psychologists in media.

He previously worked in the National Health Service as a Clinical Psychologist (where he was one of a handful of clinical psychologists at the time working in acute inpatient psychiatric care) before taking a job as a junior lecturer at the University of Liverpool, where he registered for a Ph.D. supervised by Richard Bentall. Soon after being awarded his doctorate, he moved to the University of Manchester, and then later returned to the University of Liverpool, where he became professor of Clinical Psychology.

== Kinder Media ==
Kinderman is cofounder of Kinder Media through which he offers services including psychological consultancy for broadcast media, assisting production and journalism teams with their duty of care responsibilities. He offers support with psychosocial and stress risk assessments, provides advice on mitigation strategies, and conducts psychological assessments for contributors.

== Policy work ==
Kinderman has contributed to the drafting of several pieces of legislation, including Mental Health Act, Equality Act 2010, Mental Capacity Act 2005 and statutory regulation of psychologists.

== Research interests, publications and courses ==
His research interests are in psychological processes underpinning well-being and mental health, and in particular psychotic phenomena such as delusions and hallucinations.

In 2014 he launched a free, online, open-access course exploring our understanding of mental health and well-being.

Kinderman has published widely on the role of psychological factors as mediators between biological, social and circumstantial factors in mental health and well-being. In his 2019 book, A Manifesto for Mental Health: Why We Need a Revolution in Mental Health Care, he critically examines the dominant ‘disease-model’ of mental health care and offers a contemporary, biopsychosocial, alternative.

In 2022 Kinderman had a 2021 paper he co-authored in the Journal of Mental Health retracted by the journal's editors and publisher for a "conflict of interest [that] was not disclosed upon submission of the article [...] that compromises the reliability of the reviews and the paper’s findings." In response, Kinderman wrote that "the retraction is justified."

== Roles and awards ==
In 2000, he received the British Psychological Society's Division of Clinical Psychology's 'May Davidson Award', an annual award for outstanding contributions to the field of clinical psychology, in the first ten years after qualifying.

He served the British Psychological Society as President (2016-2017) and twice as elected Chair of the Society's Division of Clinical Psychology; from 2004 to 2005, and again from 2010–2011. In that role, he worked with the UK Department of Health, the BBC, the Health Professions Council, the European Union Fundamental Rights Agency and the UK Office for National Statistics, amongst others. In 2017, he resigned from being Vice-President of the British Psychological Society, citing the formation of the Association of Clinical Psychologists (UK) as a trigger,

Kinderman was a founding trustee of the Joanna Simpson Foundation, and is a member of the Council for Evidence Based Psychiatry, and a trustee of Kyrie Therapeutic Farm, developing a novel, rights-based and recovery-focussed therapeutic farm in Kildare, Ireland.
