= Halla Beloff =

British academic

- Born: Halla Parker; 11 May 1930; Ludwigsburg, Germany
- Died: 2 February 2025 (aged 94); Edinburgh

Academic background
- Education: Queens University Belfast
- Thesis: (1956)

Academic work
- Institutions: University of Edinburgh

Halla Beloff (May 11, 1930 - February 2, 2015) was a British social and cultural psychologist.

== Career ==
Halla Beloff (born Parker) was born on 11 May 1930 in Ludwigsburg, Germany and died on 2 February 2025 in Edinburgh, Scotland. With the rise of Nazism, she moved with her parents to London. During the war she was evacuated to Cumbria. When she returned, she found work in a factory but also attended Birkbeck College part-time taking a degree in Psychology and Social Anthropology.

In London she met John Beloff whom she married in 1952. They spent a year working in Raymond Cattell’s lab in the University of Illinois. On their return they both enrolled at Queen’s University Belfast from which Halla obtained a PhD on The Anal Personality in 1956.

They then moved to the University of Edinburgh where they remained for the remainder of their academic careers.

Halla’s early published work was such topics as conformity and face perception. Then she became more interested in culture.

She was very active in the British Psychological Society. She was chair of the Psychology of Women Section; the publications committee; and the Social Psychology Section, was editor of the society's British Journal of Social and Clinical Psychology, and was president of The British Psychological Society from 1983 to 1984.

== Recognition ==
- President, British Psychological Society

== Publications ==
- Beloff, H. (1958). Two forms of social conformity: Acquiescence and conventionality. The Journal of Abnormal and Social Psychology, 56(1), 99–104.
- Beloff, H., & Beloff, J. (1959). Unconscious self-evaluation using a stereoscope. The Journal of Abnormal and Social Psychology, 59(2), 275–278.
- Beloff, H. (1985). Camera Culture. Oxford, Basil Blackwell.
