= Gustav Jahoda =

Austrian psychologist and writer

Gustav Jahoda FBA, FRSE
- Born: 11 October 1920; Vienna
- Died: 12 December 2016 (aged 96)
- Education: Birkbeck, University of London; London School of Economics
- Scientific career
- Fields: Cultural psychology; Social psychology; History of psychology
- Workplaces: University of Manchester; University College of the Gold Coast; University of Glasgow; University of Strathclyde
- Thesis: Aspects of the sociology of J.M. Robertson (MSc thesis) (1947)

Gustav Jahoda, FBA, FRSE (11 October 1920 – 12 December 2016) was an Austrian-born psychologist who made a sustained contribution to the development of cross-cultural psychology and cultural psychology.

== Biography and career ==
He was born in Vienna to a Jewish family. Leopold Jahoda, a lawyer, was his father and Olga (née Barany) his mother. He initially attended school in Vienna but was expelled because of his Jewish background. He then spent a year attending school in Paris. His family moved there after the Anschluss. In Paris, he studied civil engineering. With the outbreak of war, he joined the French army but when the French front collapsed he escaped to England. He initially worked in various engineering projects for the British Army and then was involved in some more secret work for the British government.

After he was invalided out of the army in 1942, Jahoda enrolled on a course on sociology and psychology at Birkbeck, University of London followed by an MSc and a PhD at the London School of Economics. His PhD thesis was entitled 'A study of the chief social determinants of occupational choice of secondary modern school leavers, with special reference to social class factors and the level of social aspiration'. He then obtained a lectureship in social psychology at the University of Manchester. In 1952 he took up a post at the University College of the Gold Coast (now Ghana) in the Department of Sociology, where he carried out pioneering research into cross-cultural psychology. He then worked at the University of Glasgow for three years.

In 1963, Gustav Jahoda was invited to set up a new psychology department in the University of Strathclyde. He recruited Heinz Rudolph Schaffer to assist him with this task. Despite his administrative responsibilities he continued to make field trips to West Africa. He retired in 1985 and was appointed emeritus Professor but he continued to publish on both cultural psychology and the history of psychology.

== Research ==
He published works on cross-cultural psychology, socio-cognitive development and history of the social sciences. He published a series of books and more than 200 articles.

== Awards ==
Jahoda was elected fellow of the British Academy in 1988 and fellow of the Royal Society of Edinburgh in 1993.

== Personal life ==
He married Jean Buchanan, a social worker, in 1952. When they moved to Scotland they settled in Cardross, Argyll and Bute. They had four children, Andrew, Colin, Paul and Catherine. Jean died in 1991. He subsequently developed a new relationship with Andrea Jack, a teacher. He died in 2016.

== Publications ==
- A History of Social Psychology: From the Eighteenth-Century Enlightenment to the Second World War (2007)
- Images of Savages: Ancient Roots of Modern Prejudice in Western Culture (1999)
- Crossroads Between Culture and Mind: Continuities and Change in Theories of Human Nature (1993)
- Psychology and Anthropology: A Psychological Perspective (1982)
- The Psychology of Superstition (1970)
- White Man: A Study of the Attitudes of Africans to Europeans in Ghana before Independence (1961)
