= Harry Hurwitz (psychologist) =

Canadian psychologist

Harry M.B. Hurwitz
- Born: 1923; Berlin, Germany
- Died: 4 August 2018 (aged 94–95); Toronto
- Education: University of London
- Scientific career
- Fields: Psychology, behaviourism
- Workplaces: University of London; University of Tennessee; University of Guelph

Harry M.B. Hurwitz (died 2018) was a Canadian psychologist who specialised in the field of behavior analysis.

== Life ==
Harry Hurwitz was born in Berlin, Germany to a Jewish family. With the rise of fascism in the 1930s, the family fled to South Africa where he obtained his first degree in philosophy and psychology from the University of Cape Town. He then moved to England where he obtained a PhD from the Birkbeck, University of London in 1953 for a thesis entitled Studies in operant chaining.

He was a lecturer at Birkbeck College for twelve years (1953-1965) where he established an operant psychology laboratory. He invited many behaviourist psychologists, including B.F. Skinner, to the laboratory and it became a centre for discussion on behaviourism. It was here that Hurwitz established the British Experimental Analysis of Behaviour Group. Peter Harzem was influenced by these discussions and conducted some early research in this laboratory before going on to further develop these ideas.

Hurwitz then moved to North America, first to the University of Tennessee (1964-1971) and then to the University of Guelph, Canada (1971-1983) where he became Chair of Psychology. He remained there until he retired as Emeritus Professor in 1983. He was an Honorary Professor at the University of Ostrava.

He died in Toronto in 2018.

== Work ==
Hurwitz established a reputation for his work on behaviour analysis. He also had a continuing interest in the philosophy of science.

== Positions ==
- Editorial Board, Psychologische Forschung/Psychological Research
- President, Ontario Council of Academic Psychologists

== Publications ==
- Hurwitz, H. M. B. & Davis, H. (1983). The description and analysis of conditioned suppression: A critique of the conventional suppression ratio. Animal Learning & Behavior, 11, 383–390.
- Davis, H., & Hurwitz, H. (eds)(1977). Operant-Pavlovian Interactions. Hillsdale, N.J.: Lawrence Erlbaum Associates.
- Roberts, A.E., Greenway, L., & Hurwitz, H.M.B. (1970). Extinction of free operant avoidance behavior with and without feedback. Psychonomic Science,20,282-285.
- Hurwitz, H.M.B., & Roberts, A.E. (1971). Time-out as a determinant of rate of response and rate of avoidance Psychonomic Science, 24, 131–133.
- Hurwitz, H.M.B., Roberts, A.E., & Greeway, L. (1972). Extinction and maintenance of avoidance behavior using response-independent shocks. Psychonomic Science, 28(3), 176–178.
