= British Journal of Developmental Psychology =

British Journal of Development Psychology
- Discipline: Developmental psychology
- Language: English

Publication details
- History: 1983-Present
- Publisher: Wiley-Blackwell on behalf of the British Psychological Society.
- Frequency: Quarterly
- Impact factor: 1.537 (2018)

Standard abbreviations
- ISO 4: Br. J. Dev. Psychol.

Indexing
- ISSN: 0261-510X (print); 2044-835X (web)

Links
- Journal homepage; Online access; Online archive

British Journal of Developmental Psychology is a quarterly peer-reviewed academic journal published by Wiley-Blackwell on behalf of the British Psychological Society. The journal was established in 1983. The journal covers developmental psychology topics such as social, emotional and personality development in childhood, adolescence and adulthood, the development of language and atypical development.

According to the Journal Citation Reports, the journal has a 2018 impact factor of 1.537, ranking it 52nd out of 74 journals in the category "Psychology Development".
