= Peter Banister =

British psychologist (1947-2019)

- Born: 1947
- Died: 2019 (aged 71–72)
- Education: University of Durham
- Scientific career
- Fields: Psychology, forensic psychology
- Workplaces: Manchester Metropolitan University
- Doctoral advisor: Frederick Viggers Smith.

Peter Banister (1947-2019) was a British psychologist.

== Academic career ==
Banister completed a BSc followed by a PhD in Psychology at the University of Durham. His thesis was entitled Cognitive effects of long term imprisonment. He was supervised by Frederick Viggers Smith.

He spent all of his academic career at Manchester Metropolitan University and its predecessor Manchester Polytechnic. He started as Associate Lecturer in 1972 and proceeded to Principal Lecturer and Professor. He was Head of the School and subsequently Department of Psychology for a large portion of his career. He was also a tutor at the Open University.

Banister was active in both the British Psychological Society (of which he became President) and in the Association of Heads of Psychology Departments. He was actively involved in developing innovations in teaching and authored with others in his department a popular textbook on qualitative research methods.

== Publications ==
- Banister, P., Burman, E., Parker, I., Taylor, M., & Tindall, C. (1960) Qualitative Methods in Psychology.
