= Til Wykes =

Clinical psychologist

Professor Dame Til Wykes DBE
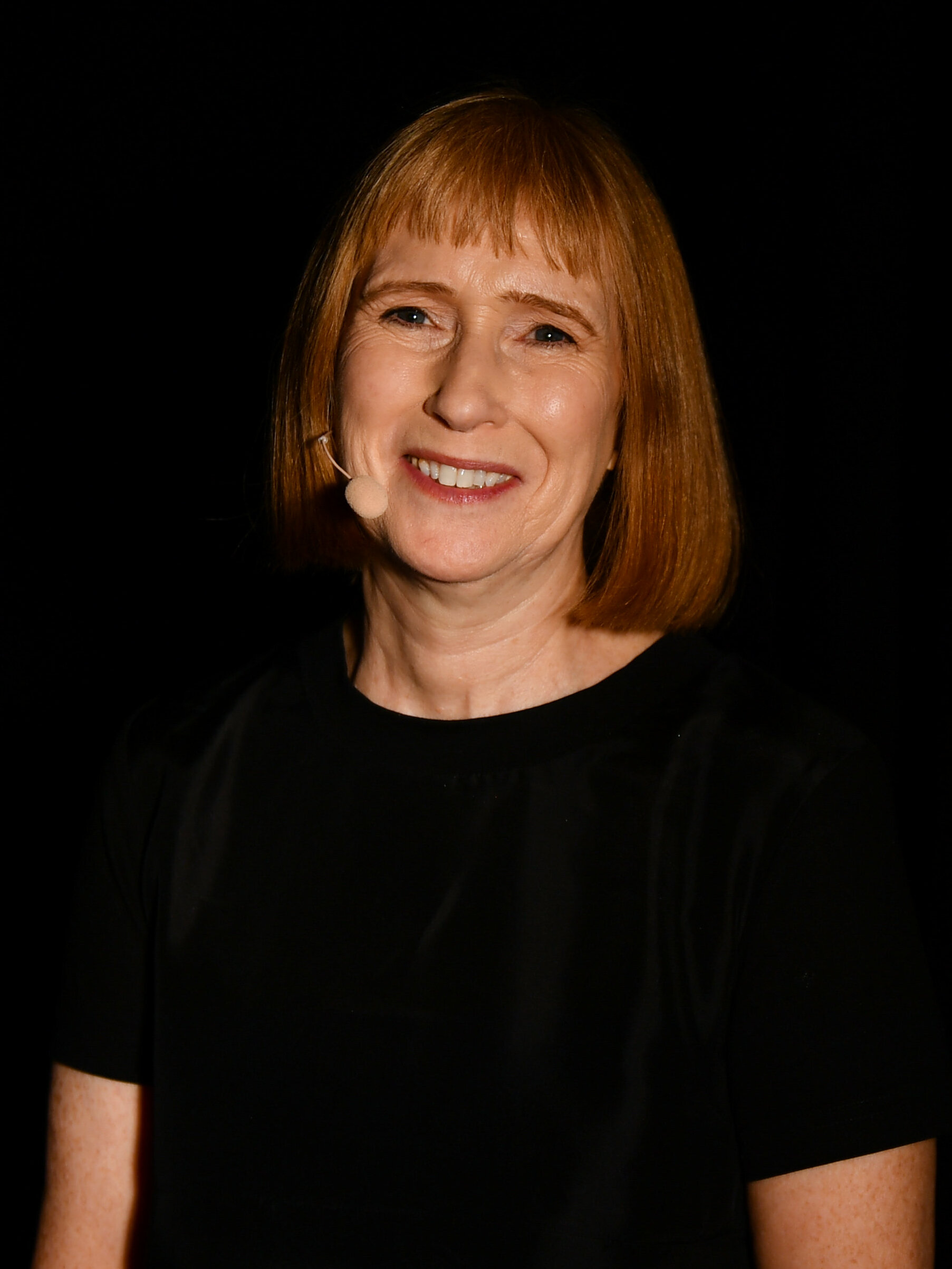
- Born: Hilary Margaret Wykes; March 1953 (age 73); United Kingdom
- Occupation: Psychologist
- Spouse: Bryn Davies, Baron Davies of Brixton
- Website: www.tilwykes.com

Dame Til Wykes, Lady Davies, DBE (born March 1953) is an English academic, author and editor.

== Career ==
Born Hilary Margaret Wykes, she is Professor of Clinical Psychology and Rehabilitation and formally Head of the School of Mental Health and Psychological Sciences at King's College London, Senior Mental Health spokesperson for the National Institute for Health and Care Research (NIHR), and President of the Schizophrenia International Research Society.

She is known for her work on Cognitive Remediation Therapy, for championing service user involvement in all mental health research and mental health research policy at King's College London.

== Research ==
Her research is focused on rehabilitation and recovery for people with severe mental illness both in the development of services and the development and evaluation of innovative psychological treatments. Her main current research themes concentrate on how to improve thinking difficulties so people can take advantage of opportunities for recovery and how to increase therapeutic activities in acute mental health services and work in digital mental health initiatives.

== Other work ==
Wykes was the director of the NIHR's Mental Health Research Network until April 2015 when she became the National Specialty lead for Mental Health and in 2018 the NIHR senior spokesperson on mental health. She mainly carries out research on developing psychological treatments for schizophrenia. She founded and was the first director of the Service User Research Enterprise (SURE) which employs expert researchers who have experience of using mental health services. Since 2002, she has been the executive editor of the Journal of Mental Health. She is also a member of the scientific advisory board of Psyberguide and the Money and Mental Health Policy Institute as well as a trustee of the charity, Weight Concern.

== Awards ==
Wykes has received three awards from the British Psychological Society's, the M.B. Shapiro Award given to "a clinical psychologist who has achieved eminence in the profession", and the May Davidson Award for a "psychologist who has made an outstanding contribution to the development of clinical psychology within the first 10 years of their work" and the 2014 Award for Promoting Equality of Opportunity for "her part in championing the active role of mental health service users in research". For all this work she was awarded a damehood by the Queen in the 2016 New Year Honours.

Wykes received the Order of Merit, Fukushima Society of Medical Science, Japan (2005), the Marie Kessel Award for Outstanding Contributions to Psychiatric Rehabilitation (2012) and an NIHR Senior Investigator. She is also a Fellow of the British Psychological Society, the Academy of Medical Sciences, the Academy of Social Sciences and a Fellow of the Academy of Cognitive Therapy. In addition she was selected as the winner of the EPA Constance Pascal – Helen Boyle Prize for Outstanding Achievement by a Woman in Working to Improve Mental Health Care in Europe for 2020.

She also carries out public involvement and on 21 March 2017, together with Hussain Manawer, she won a Guinness World Record for the largest mental health lesson, given on 21 March 2017 to 538 students at the Hackney Empire.

She has also won the Lifetime Achievement Award in Research from the International Neuropsychological Society (INS) for her contributions to developing, testing, and implementing novel treatments for people with a diagnosis of schizophrenia.

== Selected papers ==
- Wykes, Til; Reeder, Clare; et al. (2007). "Cognitive Remediation Therapy in Schizophrenia, Randomised Controlled Trial". British Journal of Psychiatry. 190: 421–27. doi:10.1192/bjp.bp.106.026575. PMID 17470957.
- Wykes Til; Huddy V.; Cellard C.; McGurk S.R.; Czobor P. (2011). "A Meta-Analysis of Cognitive Remediation for Schizophrenia: Methodology and Effect Sizes". American Journal of Psychiatry. 168 (5): 472–85. doi:10.1176/appi.ajp.2010.10060855. PMID 21406461.

== See also ==
- List of psychologists
- List of University of London people
- Hearing Voices Movement
