= Frederick Viggers Smith =

Australian-British psychologist (1912–2006)

- Born: 1912
- Died: 2006 (aged 93–94)
- Education: University of Sydney, University of London
- Scientific career
- Fields: Psychology, forensic psychology
- Workplaces: Durham University
- Doctoral students: Peter Banister

Frederick Viggers Smith (1912–2006) was an Australian/British psychologist.

== Academic career ==
After training as a teacher, Smith completed a BSc in Psychology at the University of Sydney. He then moved to the UK where he obtained a PhD from the University of London in 1948. He was appointed as a lecturer at Birkbeck College and then at the University of Aberdeen. In 1950 he was appointed Professor of Educational Psychology at Durham University and subsequently Chair of Psychology. He retired in 1976.

== Publications ==
- Smith, F.V. Explanation of Human Behaviour
- Smith F.V. Attachment of the Young: Imprinting and Other Developments
- Smith, F.V. Purpose in Animal Behaviour

== Awards ==
- Fellow, British Psychological Society
- President, British Psychological Society, 1959–60
