= Social Development (journal) =

- Discipline: Developmental psychology
- Language: English
- Edited by: Elizabeth A. Lemerise; Amy Halberstadt; Luna Centifanti

Publication details
- History: 1992–present
- Publisher: Wiley-Blackwell
- Frequency: Quarterly
- Impact factor: 2.042 (2017)

Standard abbreviations
- ISO 4: Soc. Dev.

Indexing
- ISSN: 0961-205X (print); 1467-9507 (web)
- LCCN: 2003252099
- OCLC no.: 1043658015

Links
- Journal homepage; Online access; Online archive

Social Development is a quarterly peer-reviewed online-only scientific journal covering developmental psychology, with a specific focus on children's behavioral development. It was established in 1992 by Rudolf Schaffer and is published by John Wiley & Sons.

The current editors-in-chief are Elizabeth A. Lemerise (Western Kentucky University), Amy Halberstadt (North Carolina State University), and Luna Centifanti (University of Liverpool). According to the Journal Citation Reports, the journal has a 2017 impact factor of 2.042, ranking it 31st out of 73 journals in the category "Psychology, Developmental".
