= Heinz Rudolph Schaffer =

German-born British developmental psychologist

Heinz Rudolf Schaffer HonFBPsS; FRSE
- Born: 1926; Berlin
- Died: 2008 (aged 81–82)
- Education: Birkbeck, University of London; University of Glasgow
- Scientific career
- Workplaces: University of Strathclyde
- Thesis: Psychological factors in the development of cerebral palsied children (1962)

Heinz Rudolf Schaffer (1926-2008) was a German-born British developmental psychologist.

== Life ==
He was born into a Jewish family in Berlin in 1926. With the rise of Nazism, his parents arranged his escape to England on the kindertransport. His father died of pneumonia in Theresienstadt concentration camp, and his mother was gassed in Auschwitz.

He started studying architecture at the University of Liverpool but left before completion. He moved to London, took a job with a glass exporting company, and enrolled at Birkbeck College to study psychology in the evenings.

From 1951–55, he worked at the Tavistock Clinic under the direction of John Bowlby.

In 1955, he took a position as a clinical psychologist at the Hospital for Sick Children in Yorkhill, Glasgow where he worked until 1964. At the same time, he gained his PhD from the University of Glasgow.

In 1964, he joined Gustav Jahoda to help establish the Department of Psychology at the University of Strathclyde. He began his academic career as Lecturer, was promoted to Professor and was then Head of Department from 1982 to 1991 when he retired as Emeritus Professor.

== Work ==
Schaffer was one of the most influential developmental psychologists in Britain. He researched and published prolifically in all aspects of child social development. Reflecting his own traumatic childhood, he was particularly interested in early child socialisation, attachment and mother-infant interaction. In 1992 he established the journal Social Development.

== Awards ==
- 1974 - Fellow, British Psychological Society
- 1995 - Fellow of the Royal Society of Edinburgh
- 1998 - Honorary Fellow, British Psychological Society
- 1998 - Honorary DSc, Open University
- 2004 - Bowlby-Ainsworth award for his work on attachment

== Publications ==
- Schaffer, H.R. & Emerson, P.E. (1964). The development of social attachment in infancy. Monographs of the Society for Research in Child Development, 29, no.3, serial no.94
- Schaffer, H.R. & Schaffer, E.B. (1969). Child Care and the Family. London: Bell.
- Schaffer, H.R. (1971). The Growth of Sociability. Harmondsworth: Penguin (translated into 9 languages)
- Schaffer, H.R. (ed.) )1971). The Origins of Human Social Relations. London: Academic Press.
- Schaffer, H.R. (1977). Mothering. London: Fontana; Cambridge, Mass.: Harvard University Press (translated into 15 languages)
- Schaffer, H.R. (ed) (1977). Studies in Mother-Infant Interaction. London: Academic Press (translated into 2 languages)
- Schaffer, H.R. (ed.) (1983). Nuevas Perspectivas En Psicologia Del Descarrollo En Lengua Inglesa (New perspectives in psychological development in the English language). Infancia y Apredizaja (Madrid). Monograph no.3.
- Schaffer, H.R. (1984). The Child's Entry into a Social World. London: Academic Press (translated into 2 languages).
- Schaffer, H.R. (1990). Making Decisions About Children: Psychological Questions and Answers. Oxford: Blackwell (translated into 6 languages). Second edition, 1998
- Schaffer, H.R. (1995). Early Socialisation. Leicester: British Psychological Society.
- Schaffer, H.R. (1996). Social Development. Oxford: Blackwell (translated into 6 languages).
- Schaffer, H.R. (2004). Introducing Child Psychology. Oxford: Blackwell.
