= Amy Halberstadt =

American psychologist (born 1954)

- Born: December 28, 1954 (age 71); Brooklyn, New York
- Education: Colgate University; Johns Hopkins University
- Scientific career
- Fields: Social and developmental psychology
- Workplaces: North Carolina State University

Amy Gene Halberstadt is an American psychologist specializing in the social development of emotion. She is currently Alumni Distinguished Undergraduate Professor of Psychology at North Carolina State University in Raleigh, North Carolina, and is an editor of the journal Social Development.

She developed questionnaires on emotional expression in the family that are used internationally to address a wide variety of social developmental questions. To date she has authored or co-authored more than forty articles and book chapters and two readers for graduate and undergraduate courses in social psychology. Her research has been presented at national and international conferences including the Society for Research in Child Development, the Society for Personality and Social Psychology, the Association for Psychological Science and the International Society for Research on Emotion.

She has been awarded several research grants from the National Institutes of Health (NIH) and National Science Foundation (NSF) and is currently working on a NSF-funded project examining children's understanding of emotion in the family.

== Life ==
Amy Halberstadt was born on December 28, 1954, in Brooklyn, New York. Her father was an engineer and management consultant and her mother a small businessperson. She grew up in New Hyde Park, New York, attended Colgate University for her BS in 1976 (PBK, 1975) and Johns Hopkins University as a graduate student, where she earned her PhD in 1981 working with Professor Judith Hall. From high school through her early professional life she was also a competitive fencer and fencing coach, placing sixth in women's foil at the 1985 Empire State Games in Buffalo, New York. Halberstadt and her husband Anthony Weston have two children and are active in urban agriculture in Durham, North Carolina.

== Expressiveness and social power/dominance ==
Halberstadt's work on family emotional expressiveness, begun in her doctoral dissertation under the supervision of Professor Judith Hall, is now widely cited and utilized in research on socialization of emotion and nonverbal communication. She has demonstrated contrasting relationships of family expressiveness to nonverbal skills (sending and decoding of emotional expression) and shown, with various colleagues, that family expressiveness styles influence individuals' expressiveness, emotional experience, and understanding of others' emotional experiences. The Family Expressiveness Questionnaire (FEQ) and the Self-Expressiveness in the Family Questionnaire are tools used in the service of this research. With Judy Hall, Halberstadt helped establish social psychology's interest in understanding the relation of hierarchy-related variables, such as personality dominance and actual or perceived social power, to nonverbal communication.

== Affective social competence ==
Halberstadt's key contribution to the field of social development is an integrated conceptualization of emotional communication skills, a concept she labelled Affective Social Competence (ASC). ASC includes three components: sending one's own emotional messages, receiving others' emotional messages, and experiencing emotions. Within each component are four developmental skills: becoming aware of an emotion, identifying what that emotion is, working within the social context, and regulating emotion to meet short-term and long-term goals.

The conceptualization is dynamic, to reflect the moment-to-moment changes inherent in social interactions. Halberstadt and colleagues also consider how individual characteristics, such as temperament and self-concept, and environmental contexts, such as culture and historical change, may alter how ASC components operate. The ASC construct has been used by researchers in clinical psychology, developmental psychology, and family science.

== Ongoing and new projects ==
Recognizing that parental beliefs may influence parents' emotion socialization behaviors and child outcomes and that these beliefs might vary across cultures, Halberstadt and Professors Julie Dunsmore (Department of Psychology, Virginia Tech) and Al Bryant (School of Education, UNC-Pembroke) received funding to explore the varied beliefs about emotions that parents from African American, European American, and Lumbee American Indian cultural groups hold. One goal was to develop a questionnaire to assess parents' beliefs about children's emotion (PBACE) by using a multi-ethnic, multi-class questionnaire development process, which involved over 1000 parents. Multiple studies have utilized previous versions of the PBACE in an attempt to further understand the influence of parents' beliefs about emotions on parenting behaviors and children's outcomes, including parental emotional reactions and discussion of emotion, and children's attachment, emotion understanding, ability to cope with stress, and sense of self.

Halberstadt's recent interests include the intersections of race, culture, class, and gender in the socialization of emotion, while continuing to explore the role of parental beliefs about emotion in children's emotion development. Currently she is collaborating with Dr. Patricia Garrett-Peters of the Frank Porter Graham Child Development Institute at UNC-Chapel Hill on a project funded by NSF investigating the multi-dimensionality of emotion understanding in middle childhood, as well as links between mothers' beliefs about emotions, parenting, maternal emotion socialization practices, children's emotion understanding, and social competence at school. Other current research focuses on particular emotions, such as anger, pride, and jealousy; affective social competence in general; the social construction of gender; and a variety of cultural factors.

== Bibliography ==
=== On Expressiveness and social power/dominance ===
- Halberstadt, A. G. (1986). "Family socialization of emotional expression and nonverbal communication styles and skills". Journal of Personality and Social Psychology. 51 (4): 827–836. doi:10.1037/0022-3514.51.4.827.
- Halberstadt, A. G. (1991). "Toward an ecology of expressiveness: Family socialization in particular and a model in general", in R. S. Feldman & B. Rimé, editors, Fundamentals of nonverbal behavior (NY: Cambridge University Press) pp. 106–160
- Halberstadt, A. G. & Eaton, K. L. (2003). "A meta-analysis of family expressiveness and children's emotion expressiveness and understanding". Marriage & Family Review. 34 (1–2): 35–62. doi:10.1300/j002v34n01_03. S2CID 145074311.
- Halberstadt, A. G.; Dennis, P. A.; Hess, U. (2011). "The influence of family expressiveness, individuals' own emotionality, and self-expressiveness on perceptions of others' facial expressions". Journal of Nonverbal Behavior. 35: 35–50. doi:10.1007/s10919-010-0099-5. S2CID 53137970.
- Hall, J. A. & Halberstadt, A. G. (1994). ""Subordination" and sensitivity to nonverbal cues: A study of married working women". Sex Roles. 31 (3–4): 149–165. doi:10.1007/bf01547712. S2CID 143760000.

=== Affective social competence ===
- Halberstadt, A. G.; Denham, S. A. & Dunsmore, J. C. (2001). "Affective social competence". Social Development. 10: 79–119. doi:10.1111/1467-9507.00150.

=== Parents' beliefs about emotions and emotion socialization ===
- Halberstadt, A. G.; Thompson, J. A.; Parker, A. E. & Dunsmore, J. C. (2008). "Parents' emotion-related beliefs and behaviours in relation to children's coping with the 11 September 2001 terrorist attacks". Infant and Child Development. 17 (6): 557–580. doi:10.1002/icd.569.
- Halberstadt, A. G.; Lozada, F. L. (2010). "Emotion development in infancy through the lens of culture". Emotion Review. 3: 1–12.
- Parker, A. E., Halberstadt, A. G., Dunsmore, J. C., Townley, G. E., Bryant, A., Thompson, J. A., and Beale, K. S. (in press). ""Emotions are a window into one's heart": A qualitative analysis of parental beliefs about children's emotions across three ethnic groups". Monographs of the Society for Research in Child Development.
- Stelter, R. L.; Halberstadt, A. G. (2011). "The Interplay Between Parental Beliefs about Children's Emotions and Parental Stress Impacts Children's Attachment Security". Infant and Child Development. 20 (3): 272–287. doi:10.1002/icd.693. PMC 3124851. PMID 21731472.
- Wong, M. S.; McElwain, N. & Halberstadt, A. G. (2009). "Parent, family, and child characteristics as predictors of mother- and father-reported emotion socialization practices". Journal of Family Psychology. 23 (4): 452–463. doi:10.1037/a0015552. PMID 19685981.

=== Textbooks ===
- Halberstadt, A. G.; Ellyson, S. L. (1990). Social Psychology Readings: A Century of Research. NY: McGraw-Hill. ISBN 978-0-07-025543-2.
- Ellyson, Steve; Halberstadt, Amy (1995). Explorations In Social Psychology. NY: McGraw-Hill. ISBN 978-0-07-020200-9.

== See also ==
- Developmental psychology
- Emotional expression
- Facial expression
- Self-concept
