= Robert Robertson Rusk =

Scottish educational psychologist

Robert Robertson Rusk (1879-1972) was a Scottish educational psychologist.

== Life ==
Rusk was born in Ayrshire in 1879 and attended the Free Church Training College in Glasgow from 1898 to 1901. At the same time, he took classes at the University of Glasgow, graduating with a degree in mental philosophy in 1903. He then proceeded to the University of Jena from which he graduated with PhD in philosophy in 1906. He returned to Britain and obtained a BA from the University of Cambridge in 1910.

In 1923, he was appointed to Jordanhill College, the main teacher training college in Glasgow, where he stayed until 1946, rising to Principal Lecturer in Education. He also taught the EdB (later the MEd) course at The University of Glasgow. In addition, he was heavily involved with the Scottish Council for Research in Education, serving as its first director, from 1928 to 1958.

== Work ==
Rusk produced a number of histories of education and lives of the great educators. He also researched and published the first history of teacher training in Scotland.

== Publications ==
- Rusk, R.R. The Religious Education of the Child
- Rusk, R.R. Der pragmatische und humanistische Strom in der modernen englischen Philosophie [The Pragmatic And Humanistic Stream In Modern English Philosophy]
- Rusk, R.R. (1912). Introduction to Experimental Education.
- Rusk, R.R. (1918). The Doctrine of the Great Educators

== Awards ==
- 1966 - Honorary Fellow, British Psychological Society
