= Laura Dean (psychologist) =

British occupational psychologist

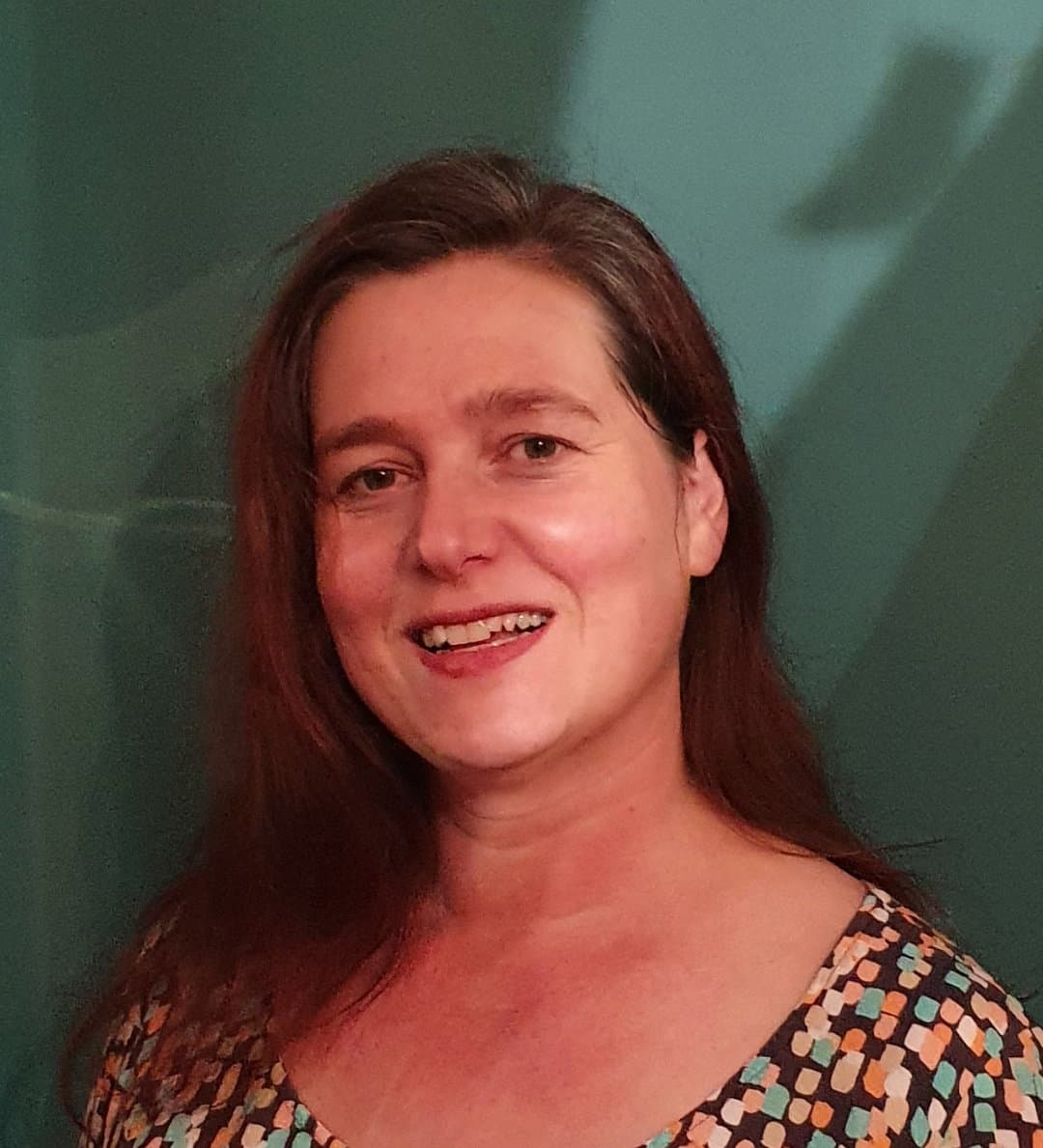
- Dean in 2020

Academic background
- Education: University of Leeds (BSc)
- Alma mater: University of Sheffield (PhD)

Academic work
- Discipline: Psychology
- Sub-discipline: Occupational Psychology

Laura Dean is a British occupational psychologist. She is the President of the British Psychological Society for 2026–2028.

== Education ==
Laura Dean graduated from the University of Leeds with a BSc Applied Psychology in 2000 and later graduated from the University of London with an MSc in Occupational Psychology in 2006.

Dean was granted Chartered status by the British Psychological Society in 2016. She completed her Doctorate in Education at the University of Sheffield.

== Career ==
Dean has academic appointments at the University of Sheffield's Institute of Work Psychology and Management School as well as Birkbeck, University of London.

She has worked as an assessor, youth worker, teacher, careers advisor, and mental health professional. She has been employed in education, mental health, and the private sector, and was once seconded to the American military.

In 2024, she was voted in as the next President of the British Psychological Society. Her term as President-Elect was from 2024 to 2026, and her term as President is from 2026 to 2028.

By 2026, she was the sole UK representative to the International Union of Psychological Science and the UK representative to the European Federation of Psychologists’ Associations.

== Awards ==
- BPS Division of Occupational Psychology Excellence in Psychology Award (2025)
- Excellence in Targeted & Psychological Wellbeing Interventions, from the Association for Business Psychology (2026)

== Publications ==
- Dean, Laura and Cousans, Fran (2023) Work Psychology: The Basics, London: Routledge. ISBN 1138048968
