= William Gidley Emmett =

William Gidley Emmett FRSE
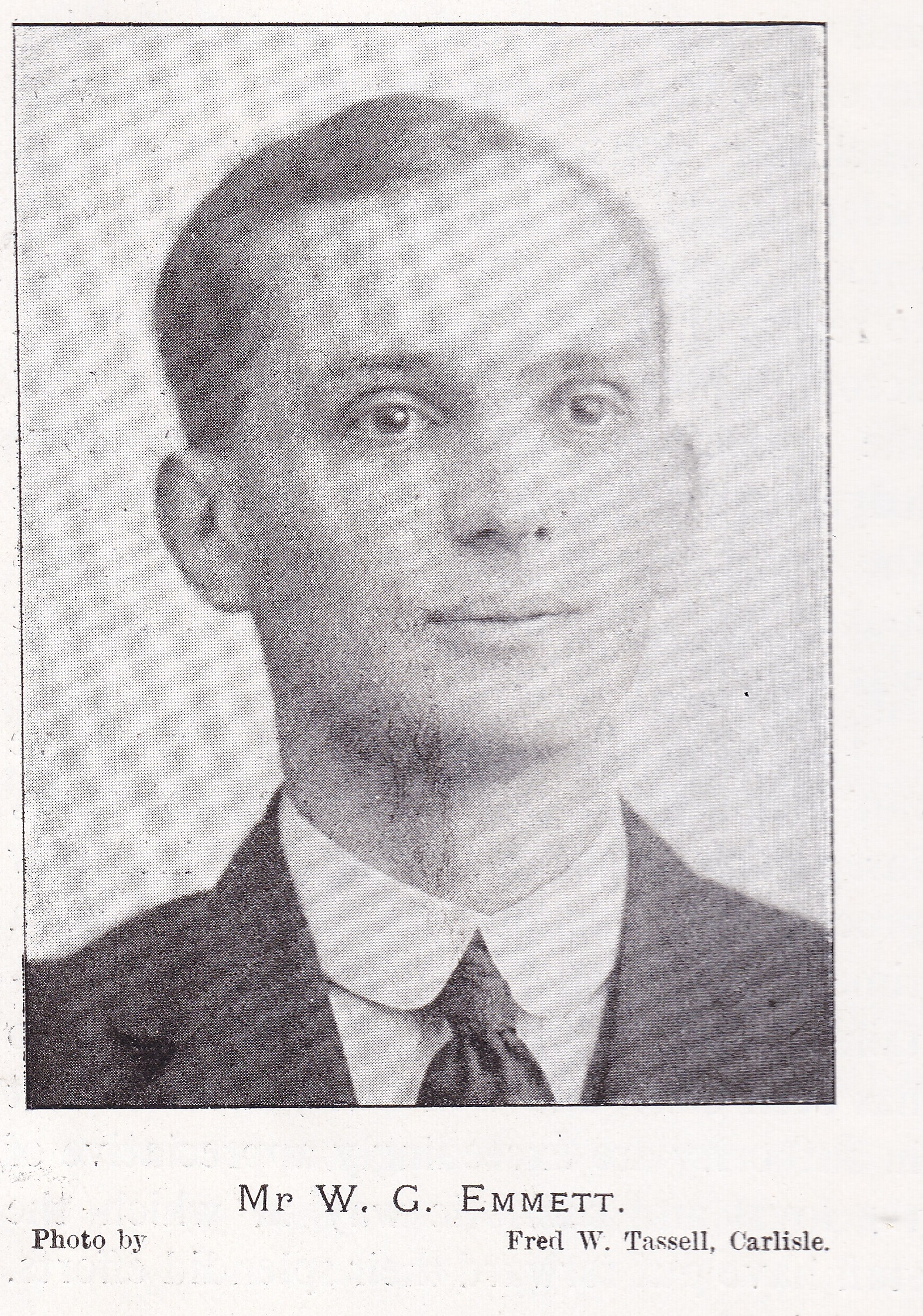
- Born: 21 August 1887; Beeston
- Died: 5 January 1985 (aged 97)
- Education: Nottingham High School, University of Cambridge
- Occupation: Industrial chemist
- Employer(s): HM Factory, Gretna, Shell Oil Company, University of Birmingham, University of Edinburgh

William Gidley Emmett FRSE (21 August 1887 – 5 January 1985) was a British industrial chemist, educationalist and academic author. In education he spoke out against traditional examination methods and developed a series of non-standard tests to assess IQ, now commonly appearing in standard IQ tests, and generally known as the Moray House Tests.

== Life ==
He was born in Beeston, a suburb of Nottingham, on 21 August 1887, the son of William Gidley Emmett, a lace-maker, and Annie Marie Emmett. He was educated at Nottingham High School then studied natural sciences at the University of Cambridge in 1905, graduating with an MA in 1908. He specialised in explosives.

His first job was at a gunpowder factory in Surrey in southern England, then in 1912 he moved to an explosives factory in Japan. He returned to Britain following the outbreak of the First World War, clearly having an important role to play. He worked first as the Assistant Manager of the guncotton section of HM Factory Queens Ferry in south Wales, then became Section manager of HM Factory, Gretna, in the cordite section. In 1919 he went to work for Shell Oil Company, being posted variously around the world in locations such as Borneo and Curacao. In 1925 he returned to Britain due to ill-health and took a role as a Researcher at the University of Birmingham. Here he remet Charles Wilfred Valentine whom he had befriended at Cambridge.

In 1935 he joined the University of Edinburgh as a lecturer in Experimental Education. He remained there as Director of the Godfrey Thomson Unit for Educational Research, Moray House, until retiral in 1953. His time there was interrupted by the Second World War where he again oversaw explosive production, this time under Albert Pilliner.

In 1954, following his retiral, he was elected a Fellow of the Royal Society of Edinburgh. His proposers were Sir Godfrey Thomson, Alexander Aitken, Ivor Malcolm Haddon Etherington and Derrick Lawley.

In 1955, aged 68, he married Margarete Annelisa Hartmann, in Düsseldorf. They had no children.

He died on 5 January 1985, aged 97.

== Publications ==
- The Reliability of Examinations (1932) co-written with Charles Wilfred Valentine
- An Inquiry into the Prediction of Secondary-School Success (1945)
- The Trend of Intelligence in Certain Districts of England (1950)
- Instructions (1956)
- Deeside Picture Puzzles (1956)
- Deeside Non-Verbal Reasoning Test (1963)
