= Grace Rawlings =

British psychologist (1909-1988)

- Born: 1909
- Died: 1988 (aged 78–79)
- Education: University College London
- Scientific career
- Fields: Psychology, educational psychology

Grace Rawlings (1909-1988) was a British educational psychologist who played a leading role in the establishment of educational psychology in Britain.

== Career ==
Rawlings read psychology at University College London under the supervision of Charles Spearman. This was followed by teacher training at the Institute of Education. After teaching for two years she undertook training in child guidance.

After various roles in child guidance services she was appointed educational psychologist in Oxford and then West Sussex. She also became involved in the training of school medical officers and educational psychologists. She was a member of the working party on the work of educational psychologists (chaired by Arthur Summerfield) and sat on the Soulbury Committee.

She was very active in the British Psychological Society becoming its Honorary Secretary and then President. She was awarded an OBE in 1970.

== Honours ==
- 1966 - 1967 - President, British Psychological Society
- 1970 - OBE
