= Kindermann =

Kindermann is a German surname. Notable people with the surname include:

- August Kindermann (1817–1891), German bass-baritone
- Balthasar Kindermann (1636–1706), German poet
- Franz Kindermann, German merchant
- Heinz Kindermann (born 1942), German politician
- Johann Erasmus Kindermann (1616–1655), German composer
- Lydia Kindermann (1892–1953), Polish opera singer

== Sport ==
- Sociedade Esportiva Kindermann, women's football club in Brazil

== See also ==
- Kinderman
