= Charles Ian Howarth =

British psychologist (1928–2019)

- Born: Charles Ian Howarth; 1928; Swinton, England
- Died: 2019 (aged 90–91)
- Scientific career
- Fields: Psychology
- Workplaces: University of Oxford

Charles Ian Howarth (1928–2019) was a British psychologist.

== Life ==
Howarth was born in Swinton, Lancashire and was a pupil at Manchester Grammar School. Subsequently, he read chemistry at the University of Oxford followed by a degree in Physiology and Psychology. For National Service he enlisted in the Royal Air Force and completed a DPhil in human vision at the Institute of Aviation Medicine. He then gained an appointment as lecturer at the University of Hull . In 1962 he was appointed Professor and Head of the Department of Psychology at the university of Nottingham where he remained for thirty years. He established the Accident Research Unit at Nottingham.

He was active in the British Psychological Society of which he was elected president in 1982.

== Research ==
His primary research interest remained in human vision but also expanded to other areas of experimental psychology as well as road accidents, mobility of blind people and the education of deaf children.

== Publications ==
- Wood, D., Griffiths, A., Howarth, I., & Woods, H. (1995). Teaching and Talking with Deaf Children.
- Howarth, C.I., & Gillham, W.E. (eds) (1981). The Structure of Psychology (1981). Allen & Unwin
- Howarth, C.I. (1954). Strength-duration curves for electrical stimulation of the human eye (1954). Quarterly Journal of Experimental Psychology, 6, 41–61.

== Awards ==
- 1982-1983 - President, British Psychological Society
