= Frank Noel Hales =

Founding members of the British Psychological Society 1903

Frank Noel Hales (1878– 14 October 1952) was a British psychologist and one of the founding members of the British Psychological Society.

== Career ==
Frank Noel Hales was born in Saumur, France in 1878. He attended the University of Cambridge, where he earnt a first class in the Moral Sciences Tripos in 1899. He graduated in 1900. His examiners were James Ward, G.F. Stout, and Carveth Read. In 1902, he received the Allen Scholarship and presented the papers A contribution to the analysis of the process of comparison and The fluctuation of the dream image to early meetings of the British Psychological Society.

In 1903, the British Psychological Society was formally established. Hales was one of the ten founding members.

Hales published a paper entitled Materials for the psycho-genetic theory of comparison in the first volume of the British Journal of Psychology(1904–5).

He moved to Montreal in 1907, where he worked as a psychologist. He later became a fruit farmer in British Columbia. He died on 14 October 1952.
