= Alan D. B. Clarke =

British psychologist

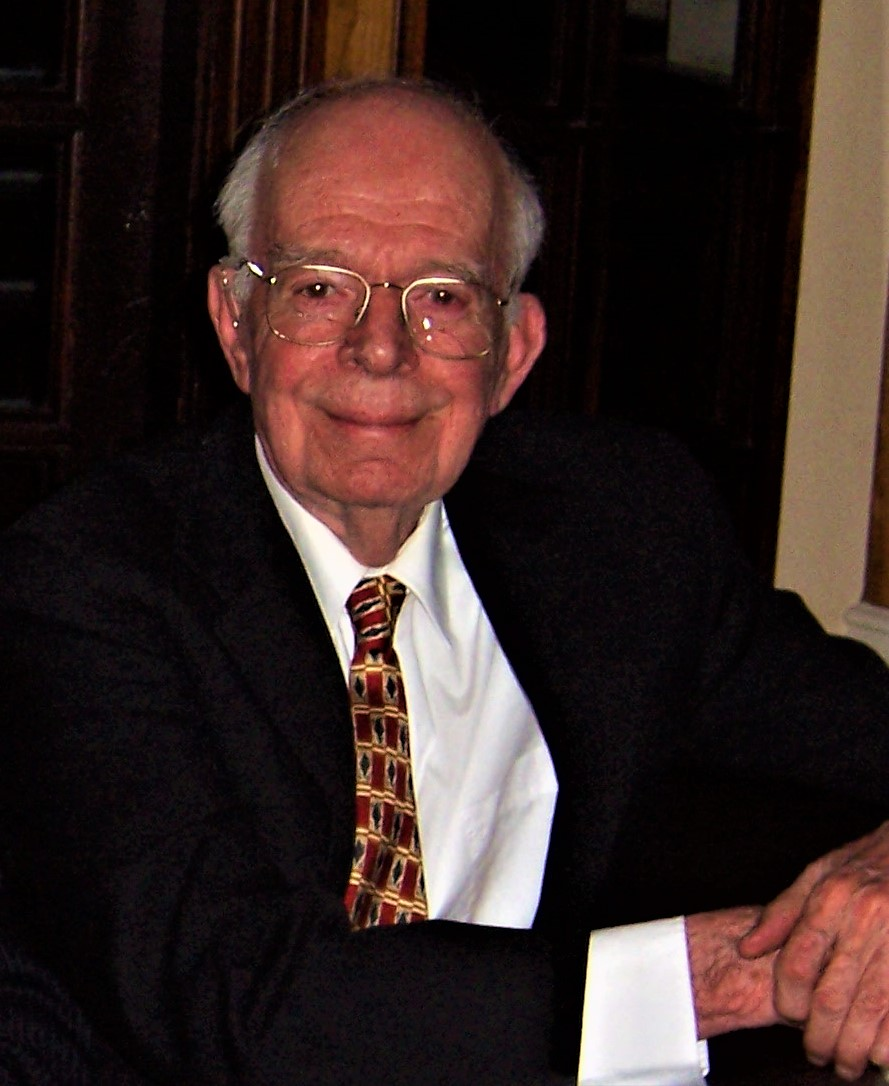
Clarke at the Royal Station Hotel Hull, 2008

Alan Douglas Benson Clarke CBE (21 March 1922 – 10 December 2011) was a British psychologist who specialised in the field of learning disability.

== Life ==
Clarke was born on 21 March 1922. He grew up in Surrey, where his father was a solicitor. He served in the army during the war and afterwards completed a BSc in Psychology at the University of Reading where he met his future wife Ann Gravely, also a psychologist. He then undertook a PhD at the Institute of Psychiatry in London.

In 1951 Alan and Ann Clarke began working at Manor Hospital, Epsom working with children with learning disabilities. He then moved to the University of Hull to establish the Department of Psychology.

== Work ==
Clarke is renowned for his work on learning disability. He was President of the British Psychological Society and also editor of the British Journal of Psychology. In addition, he was President of the International Association for the Scientific Study of Intellectual Disability. He was appointed CBE in the 1974 Birthday Honours for "services to the Training Council for Teachers of the Mentally Handicapped."

== Books ==
Clarke A., & Clarke, A. (1958 – 1985). Mental Deficiency: The Changing Outlook.

== Awards ==
- 1974: CBE
- 1977 – 1978: President, British Psychological Society
- 2007: Honorary Fellow, British Psychological Society
