= James Orford =

Clinical and community psychologist

James Orford is a clinical and community psychologist based in Birmingham, UK.

Orford completed his undergraduate degree in Natural Sciences/Psychology. He then proceeded to the Institute of Psychiatry in London where he completed the Diploma in Clinical Psychology followed by a PhD.

He then worked as a clinical psychologist in London and Manchester before taking up a joint NHS/University post in Exeter directing the training programme in clinical psychology at the University of Exeter.

In 1993, Orford moved to the University of Birmingham initially to direct the training programme in clinical psychology. He then spent the period until his retirement actively conducting research on addictions. He was Head of the Alcohol, Drugs, Gambling and Addiction Research Group.

== Books ==
- Orford, J. (2001). Excessive Appetites. London: Wiley
- Orford, J. (2008). Community Psychology: Challenges, Controversies and Emerging Consensus. London: Wiley.
- Orford, J. (2011). An Unsafe Bet? The Dangerous Rise of Gambling and the Debate We Should be Having. London: Wiley-Blackwell.

== Awards ==
- 2010 - E.M. Jellinek international award for excellence in the field of alcohol and other addictions
- 2011 - Honorary Fellow, British Psychological Society
