= Ralph R. Hetherington =

British psychologist (1917–2000)

- Born: 1917
- Died: 23 February 2000 (aged 82–83)
- Scientific career
- Fields: Psychology, clinical psychology
- Workplaces: University of Liverpool

Ralph R. Hetherington (1917 – 23 February 2000) was a British clinical psychologist who for a period was General Secretary of the British Psychological Society.

== Life ==
After training in clinical psychology, Hetherington worked for a period in the Creighton Royal Hospital in Dumfries about which he wrote Hetherington, 1956). He then took up a joint academic/clinical appointment with the University of Liverpool and the United Liverpool Hospitals. In this position he established a training programme in clinical psychology and co-authored a textbook for medical students.

He was active in the British Psychological Society of which he became General Secretary in 1973 and then was elected president in 1982. In his presidential address he emphasised the need psychologists to realise that the discipline is not only a natural science but also a social and interpretive science and for this reason it should develop its own methods of inquiry.

He joined the Quakers as a young conscientious objector during World War II and remained active in the fellowship for over 40 years.

He died on 23 February 2000, aged 82.

== Publications ==
- Hetherington, R. (1956). The effects of ECT on the efficiency and retentivity of depressed patients. British Journal of Medical Psychology, 29 (3–4), 258–269.
- Hetherington, R.R., Miller, D.H. & Neville, J.G. (1964). An Introduction to Psychology for Medical Students.
- Hethering, R. (1983). Communication between doctors and psychologists. British Journal of Medical Psychology, 56(1), 99–104.
- Hetherington, R. 1987. The changing role of the clinical psychologist. Bulletin of the British Psychological Society, 34: 12–14.
- Heatherington, R. (2009). Psychology in the Preclinical Curriculum at Liverpool. Medical Education 2(1):41-44.

== Awards ==
- 1982-1983 - President, British Psychological Society
