= Vicki Bruce =

English psychologist, born 1953

Dame Vicki Bruce DBE CPsychol FBPsS FRSE FBA
- Born: Victoria Geraldine Bruce; 4 January 1953 (age 73); Essex, England
- Citizenship: British
- Education: Newnham College, Cambridge
- Awards: OBE (1997); DBE (2015)
- Scientific career
- Fields: Psychology
- Workplaces: Newcastle University; University of Nottingham; University of Stirling; University of Edinburgh
- Thesis: Processing and remembering pictorial information (1977)
- Doctoral advisor: Alan Baddeley

Dame Victoria Geraldine Bruce, DBE CPsychol FBPsS FRSE FBA (born 4 January 1953), known as Vicki Bruce, is an English psychologist, Professor of Psychology and former Head of the School of Psychology at Newcastle University. She is known for her work on human face perception and person memory, including face recognition and recall by eyewitnesses and gaze. and other aspects of social cognition. She is also interested in visual cognition more generally. She was made a Dame in the 2015 Birthday Honours list.

== Education ==
Bruce was born on 4 January 1953 in Essex, England. She graduated from Newnham College, University of Cambridge in 1974 with a BA in Natural Sciences and completed her PhD 'Processing and remembering pictorial information' in 1977 at the MRC Applied Psychology Unit, supervised by Alan Baddeley.

== Career ==
Bruce worked briefly as a demonstrator at Newcastle University before moving to the University of Nottingham as a Lecturer in 1978, where she was promoted to Reader in 1988 and Professor in 1990. In 1992 she moved to University of Stirling, where she was Deputy Principal for Research from 1995 until 2002. From 2002 to 2008 she was Vice Principal and Head of the College of Humanities and Social Science at the University of Edinburgh. In 2008 she became Head of the School of Psychology at Newcastle University, a role she held until 2015. She remains at Newcastle University as a Professor of Psychology.

== Honours and awards ==
Bruce is an Honorary Fellow of the British Psychological Society, a Fellow of the British Academy, and a Fellow of the Royal Society of Edinburgh. She was President of the BPS in 2001 and is President Elect of the Experimental Psychology Society, to assume the role of President from 2010.

Bruce received the Presidents' Award from the BPS in 1997, was co-recipient of the BPS book award, with Andy Young in 2001 and the BPS Cognitive Psychology Award, with Mike Burton and Peter Hancock in 2000. She received an honorary DSc from Goldsmiths, University of London in 2002, and from the University of St Andrews in 2007. She received an honorary Fellowship of Cardiff University in 2006 and of the Edinburgh College of Art in 2008. She is a member of the Advisory Council of the Campaign for Science and Engineering.

She was appointed Officer of the Order of the British Empire (OBE) for 'Services to Psychology' in 1997. In the 2015 Queen's Birthday Honours, she was appointed a Dame Commander of the Order of the British Empire (DBE) 'for services to Higher Education and Psychology'.
