= Ann M. Clarke =

Developmental psychologist

Ann Margaret Clarke (1928–2015) was a British developmental psychologist who conducted research into children with learning disability.

== Career ==
Clarke was born in Madras, India. She studied psychology at the University of Reading where she met Alan D.B. Clarke who would become her life-long partner. She obtained her PhD from the Institute of Psychiatry, London (Part of King's College, London). She moved with Alan Clarke to Manor Hospital, Epsom where they worked with children with intellectual disability.

In 1965 they moved to the University of Hull where Alan Clarke was appointed chair of psychology. In 1985 Ann Clarke was appointed to a personal chair in the Department of Education. She was a member of the editorial board of Educational Psychology.

== Research ==
Clarke's research on learning disabilities emphasised the importance of social context and how impoverished living conditions limited opportunities for growth. She also challenged the idea of the role of 'critical periods' in human development.

Her research was influential in social policy. Trevor Parmenter concluded his obituary with the words: 'It is salutary to be reminded how the results of a long trajectory of consistent research on a theme can have remarkable effects on policy and practice, leading to the betterment of the quality of lives of people. We can honour the lives of people such as Ann Clarke for their contributions to science, but we should also honour her capacity and determination to challenge conventional wisdom.'

== Selected publications ==
- Clarke, Ann M.; Clarke, Alan D. B.; Berg, Joseph M., eds. (1985). Mental Deficiency: The Changing Outlook (4th ed.). Methuen. ISBN 978-0-416-38160-3.
- Clarke, Ann M.; Clarke, Alan D. B. (1976). Early Experience: Myth and Evidence. Open Books. ISBN 978-0-7291-0140-0.
- Clarke, Ann M.; Clarke, Alan D. B. (2000). Early Experience and the Life Path. Jessica Kingsley Publishers. ISBN 978-1-85302-858-8.

== Award ==
- 2007: Honorary Fellow, British Psychological Society
