= May Alison Davidson =

British psychologist (1914-1982)

- Born: May Alison Davidson; 1914
- Died: 1982 (aged 67–68)
- Education: University of Cape Town
- Scientific career
- Fields: Psychology, clinical psychology

May Alison Davidson (1914–1982) was a psychologist originally from South Africa who moved to Britain and had a major influence on the development of the profession in that country.

== Career ==
Davidson was born in South Africa where she graduated from the University of Cape Town. She moved to Britain in 1938 to take up a fellowship at University College London. She was attached to the Operational Research Unit of the Admiralty during the war. Afterwards she began working as an educational psychologist for the City of Oxford but then shifted her focus to clinical psychology. She remained in Oxford until her retirement in 1980.

She was very involved in government discussions about the role of clinical psychologists and was actively involved in the British Psychological Society becoming its president in 1976. In her presidential address she discussed the need for scientific and applied psychologists to work together.

== Honours ==
- 1976 - 1977 - President, British Psychological Society
