= George C. Drew =

British psychologist

- Scientific career
- Fields: Experimental psychology
- Workplaces: University College London

George C. Drew was a British experimental psychologist.

== Life ==
In 1959, Drew was appointed Head of the Department of Psychology at University College London. As Head he ensured that the department was recognised as a biological science located within the Faculty of Science. The department began to offer a BSc Honours degree in Psychology.

Drew was active in the British Psychological Society of which he was elected president in 1962. His Presidential address was entitled The study of accidents in which he argued that psychologists tend to shelter [their] insecurity as psychologists in a methodological mystique rather than expertise. He also talked about the impact of alcohol on accidents (Drew, 1963).

== Research ==
His research was in the area of skilled behaviour. His work on the effect of alcohol on various skills was some of the research leading to the introduction of the breathalyser (Drew et al., 1959).

== Publications ==
- Drew, G.C. (1963). The study of accidents. Bulletin of the British Psychological Society, 16(52), 1–10.
- Drew, G.C. (1942). Mental fatigue. Flying Personnel Research Committee, Report No. 227.
- Drew, G.C., Colquhoun, W.P., & Long, H.A. (1959). Effect of small doses of alcohol on a skill resembling driving. London: HMSO.

== Awards ==
- 1962 - President, British Psychological Society
