= International Philosophical Quarterly =

- Discipline: Philosophy
- Language: English
- Edited by: Christopher M. Cullen, S.J.

Publication details
- History: 1961–present
- Publisher: Philosophy Documentation Center

Standard abbreviations
- ISO 4: Int. Philos. Q.

Indexing
- ISSN: 0019-0365 (print); 2153-8077 (web)
- LCCN: 63053298
- OCLC no.: 1876622

Links
- Journal homepage; Online access

The International Philosophical Quarterly is a peer-reviewed academic journal edited by a group of academics at Fordham University, with the collaboration of the Université de Namur in Belgium. The journal was established in 1961 to provide a publishing forum for the international exchange of basic philosophical ideas. It is published by the Philosophy Documentation Center.

== Notable Articles (ordered by date of publication) ==
- "What Philosophy Meant to the Greeks?" by Cornelia Johanna de Vogel (1961).
- "The Logic of Attribution in Plotinus" by Jean Trouillard (1961).
- "Man's Existence" by Paul Weiss (philosopher) (1961).
- "The Hermeneutics of Symbols and Philosophical Reflections" by Paul Ricoeur (1962).
- "Zen and Western Thought" by Masao Abe (1970).
- "The Akan Concept of a Person" by Kwame Gyekye (1978).
- "Sagacity in African Philosophy" by Henry Odera Oruka (1983).
- "The Meaning of Body in Classical Chinese Thought" by Roger T. Ames (1984).
- "The Emotions: A Philosophical Exploration" by Robert C. Solomon (2002).

== Abstracting and indexing ==
The journal is abstracted and indexed in:

- Academic Search
- L'Année philologique
- Arts & Humanities Citation Index
- ATLA Religion Database
- Current Contents/Arts & Humanities
- Expanded Academic ASAP
- FRANCIS
- Index Philosophicus
- Index Religiosus
- InfoTrac OneFile
- International Bibliography of Periodical Literature
- International Philosophical Bibliography
- MLA International Bibliography
- The Philosopher's Index
- PhilPapers
- ProQuest databases
- VINITI Database RAS
- Scopus
- TOC Premier

== See also ==
- List of philosophy journals
