= Beatrice Edgell =

British psychologist and academic

- Edgell in 1927
- Born: 26 October 1871; Tewkesbury, Gloucestershire, England
- Died: 10 August 1948 (aged 76); Cheltenham, Gloucestershire, England
- Education: University College Wales, Aberystwyth, University of London
- Occupations: Psychologist, professor
- Employer: Bedford College (1898–1933)
- Known for: First British woman psychology PhD (1901), first British woman professor of psychology (1927)

Beatrice Edgell (26 October 1871 – 10 August 1948) was a British psychologist, researcher and university teacher. She taught at Bedford College in the University of London from 1897 to 1933. She was the first British woman to earn a PhD in psychology and the first British woman to be named a professor of psychology. She was also the first female president of the British Psychological Society, the Aristotelian Society, the Mind Association and the Psychological Division of the British Association for the Advancement of Science.

== Early life and education ==
Edgell was born in Tewkesbury, Gloucestershire, England, in 1871, the youngest of six children of Edward Higginson Edgell and his wife, the former Sarah Ann Buckle. Edward Edgell was a bank manager in Tewkesbury. Beatrice Edgell's mother died when her youngest daughter was 11 years old.

She attended Tewkesbury High School for Girls between the ages of 10 and 14. In 1886 she went to Notting Hill High School for Girls, leaving in 1891 to enter University College Wales, Aberystwyth, where she studied mainly philosophy. She earned a Bachelor of Arts (BA) degree in Mental and Moral sciences from the University of London in 1894.

From 1894 to 1897 Edgell taught high school in Sunderland and Blackburn, earning a teaching diploma from the University of London in 1896. In 1897 she returned to study in Aberystwyth, where her alma mater had become part of the University of Wales. In 1898 she earned a BA in philosophy from the University of Wales, followed in 1899 by a Master of Arts degree from the same university.

Edgell spent the 1900–01 winter semester and the 1901 summer semester at the University of Würzburg, supported by a travelling research fellowship from the University of Wales. Under the supervision of Oswald Külpe, she wrote a doctoral dissertation entitled Die Grenzen des Experiments als einer psychologischen Methode, which was "a theoretical discussion of the limits of the experiment as a method in psychology". She defended her dissertation successfully on 30 July 1901, thereby becoming the first woman to earn a doctoral degree from the University of Würzburg and the first British woman to be awarded a PhD in psychology by any university.

== Career ==
In January 1898, Edgell had begun her university teaching career at Bedford College in London as lecturer in philosophy and head of the department of mental and moral science, which became the department of philosophy and psychology in 1906. When she returned in 1901 from her year's leave of absence at the University of Würzburg, she set up one of Britain's first psychological laboratories at the college. Beatrice Edgell was named professor of psychology in 1927 by the University of London. She was the first female professor of psychology in Britain.

Edgell's early research projects included collaborating with the physiologist William Legge Symes to calibrate the Wheatstone-Hipp chronoscope, a piece of equipment used in experimental psychology to measure reaction time. She later undertook a large-scale empirical study of memory with 1,200 children between the ages of 8 and 12 as the primary subjects. Among her publications were an article on memory in the 1929 edition of the Encyclopædia Britannica and her 1924 book Theories of Memory. She wrote two textbooks, Mental Life and Ethical Problems, introducing applied psychology to social studies and nursing students respectively.

Edgell was one of the earliest members of the British Psychological Society, and presented a paper on time judgement at the association's fifth meeting in 1903. She was the first woman president of the British Psychological Society, a position she held from 1930 to 1932. In 1932 she became the first woman president of the Psychological Section of the British Association for the Advancement of Science.

Edgell retained her connection with philosophy, becoming a member of the Aristotelian Society in 1910. In 1930 she became the society's first woman president. Her presidential address presented an analysis of the concept of the "image" from both a philosophical and psychological point of view. She also became the first woman president of the Mind Association in 1927.

Edgell taught at Bedford College for 35 years, retiring in 1933. The Oxford Dictionary of National Biography describes her as a "standard-bearer for psychology" and a "conscientious and painstaking teacher who cared deeply about the education, welfare, and future careers of her students." In 1924 the University of Wales awarded her the degree of Doctor of Letters. On her retirement she was named emeritus professor of psychology.

== Later years ==
Edgell retired to Bishop's Cleeve in Gloucestershire, where she lived with her unmarried brother and sister. She worked in a local child guidance clinic and acted as an examiner in psychology for the Royal College of Nursing, as well as remaining active in professional associations including the British Psychological Society. Edgell died of cancer, in Cheltenham, on 10 August 1948.

== Legacy ==
Edgell's obituary in the British Journal of Psychology stated that "the success of her work is demonstrated by the success of her students in many widely differing fields." Among her students who became notable psychologists were Molly Harrower, Winifred Raphael, and Olive Wheeler.

The University of Würzburg Faculty of Human Sciences's annual award for the best dissertation by a female PhD student is named the Beatrice Edgell Award in honour of the first woman to receive a doctoral degree from the university.
