= George Seth =

Scottish psychologist (1905-1990)

- Born: 1905
- Died: 1990 (aged 84–85)
- Education: University of Edinburgh
- Scientific career
- Fields: Psychology
- Workplaces: University of Edinburgh; University College, Cardiff; Queen's University Belfast
- Thesis: The problem of stuttering : a clinical and experimental study (1933)

George Seth (1905-1990) was a psychologist originally from Scotland who played an influential role in the establishment of psychology in Northern Ireland.

== Career ==
Seth was born in Scotland and educated at the University of Edinburgh where he obtained a MA in English Literature followed by a BEd and finally a PhD in child psychology. He then held various posts at the University of Edinburgh and University College, Cardiff. After the war he moved to Belfast to take up a post as lecturer and subsequently Professor of Psychology in Queen's University Belfast. The department grew in size under his leadership developing training programmes in clinical, educational and occupational psychology. He retired from this position in 1972.

He was active in the British Psychological Society becoming its president in 1967. He also led the establishment of a Northern Ireland branch of the society.

== Research ==
His main research interest was in child psychology and he published a book on speech in childhood.

== Publications ==
- Seth, G. (1935). Speech in Childhood.

== Honours ==
- 1967 - 1968 - President, British Psychological Society
