= Ray Hodgson =

New Zealand footballer

Personal information
- Full name: Raymond J A Hodgson
- Place of birth: New Zealand

Senior career*
Years	Team	Apps	(Gls)
- North Shore United

International career
1948	New Zealand	4	(0)
- * Club domestic league appearances and goals

Ray Hodgson is a former association football player who represented New Zealand at international level.

Hodgson made four official appearances for the All Whites, all against Australia, the first a 0–6 loss on 14 August and his fourth and final appearance a 1–8 loss less than a month later on 11 September 1948.
