= Robert John Bartlett =

British psychologist

Robert John Bartlett (1879–1980) was a British psychologist.

== Career ==
Bartlett was born in 1879. In 1921, he obtained an MSc Psychology as an external student of the University of London through courses taken at King's College and Bedford College. He was also awarded an ARCSc (Associate of the Royal College of Science), an undergraduate award from the former Royal College of Science. He originally trained in chemistry.

From 1919, he was Assistant Director and then, from 1921, Director of the Psychological Department at Bethlem Hospital until the NHS took over. He was also Lecturer in Normal Psychology to nurses at St. Bartholomew's Hospital, London.

He was elected President of the British Psychological Society in 1947. He concluded his Presidential Address to the Society with the words: "Psychology is now a vast subject split up into many different sections, each using its own jargon, knowing very little of what is happening in other sections, and, in several cases, claiming that its part is the whole."

== Awards ==
1963 - Honorary Fellow, British Psychological Society
