= Nicky Hayes =

British psychologist and author

Nicky Hayes is an English psychologist and author of over 25 books on psychology, management, and neuroscience. She has made contributions to psychology education, research methods, and applied psychology. Her books include specialised textbooks, supplementary publications, and accessible introductions to psychology. She has written a number of articles for psychology-related magazines and newsletters, is a member of the Society of Authors, a fellow of the British Psychological Society, an honorary life member of the Association for the Teaching of Psychology, and a member of Council of the International Test Commission.

Hayes is a visiting professor at the University of Suffolk and engages in consultancy on psychological matters for both government and private organisations. She was president of the British Psychological Society from 2022 to 2024.

== Early life ==
Nicola Jane Hayes was born in 1953, near Maidenhead in Berkshire, England. She lived in the area until 1964, when she moved to the Wirral.

She attended Wallasey High School until 1971. From 1972 until 1975, she studied psychology at the University of Leeds.

From 1976 to 1979, she worked as a Residential Social Worker with Leeds City Council, when she left to take a PGCE in Further and Higher Education at Holly Bank, Huddersfield, from 1979 to 1980. From 1981 to 1983, she returned to the University of Leeds and undertook an M.Ed.

== Psychology education ==
Hayes was involved in the development of pre-degree psychology in the UK.

Having taken a PGCE for Further and Higher Education, she worked part-time teaching psychology at A-Level and AO-level in various technical colleges in West Yorkshire.

In 1982, she became an AO level examiner with the Joint Matriculation Board. She noticed that more support was needed for teachers due to the diversity in the range and quality of the teaching. She worked with others to establish that support through the Association for the Teaching of Psychology, acting as Hon Secretary from 1982 to 1984 and chair from 1984 to 1985. This work resulted in publications, local groups, a resource bank and the establishment of an annual conference which continues to be the main CPD provider for teachers of pre-degree psychology.

In 1985, she joined the Membership and Qualifications Board of the British Psychological Society to raise the profile of this level of teaching in the psychological "establishment". Later in that year she became the first Hon. Secretary of a new Special Group for the Teaching of Psychology. From 1989 to 1995, she served as the Registrar for a BPS Diploma in the Teaching of Psychology. From 1993 to 1998, she chaired the BPS Training Committee for the Applied Psychology of Teaching.

She was a founder member of the BPS Division, established in 1997, which is now the Division of Academic Research and Teaching in Psychology, and, also in 1997, received the British Psychological Society Award for Distinguished Contributions to the Teaching of Psychology.

From 1983 to 2002, Hayes worked with a number of public exam boards in various roles examining A, AO level, and GCSE psychology, acting as Chief Examiner and as Chair of Examiners, contributing to syllabus development and conducting scrutinies of Exam Board practices. In 2016–17, she contributed to the revision of the AQA syllabus for GCSE psychology.

She also impacted the popularity of the subject by producing a number of textbooks and study guides for both teachers and students. Her introductory books have been translated into several languages, and she was a keynote speaker on the value of pre-degree psychology at psychology teachers' conferences in Australia, Denmark, and Russia.

== Research methods ==
Using her expertise in social research methods, Hayes has taught research methods to a range of students, including psychology undergraduates and postgraduates, Environmental Health trainees, MBA trainees, and students on an Educational Psychology Doctorate programme.

She is editor of two publications on psychometrics and is involved in the work of both the BPS Psychological Testing Centre and the International Test Commission.

She was a founder member of the British Psychological Society's Qualitative Methods group, established during the 1990s, to promote the use of qualitative method in psychological research. As a result of those discussions, she edited a textbook illustrating the range of qualitative methods used by psychologists, and subsequently a comprehensive research and analysis textbook for students which treated qualitative approaches in detail. These publications contributed to the increased acceptance of qualitative research in UK psychology.

== Applied psychology ==
Hayes applies a range of psychological concepts across new areas. Her research in organisational psychology produced a model detailing the social psychological processes of social identification and social representation, which underlie organisational cultures, and determine their efficacy in terms of employee engagement.

She has worked with SMEs to facilitate growth, drawing on psychological research into social identification to show how awareness of these mechanisms can contribute to positive employee experience and effective employee management. She has conducted research on the psychological contract and organisational commitment at work, and published two books on the psychology of effective team-working.

During the 1990s, she participated in AI workshops conducted by the European Society for the Study of Cognitive Systems and contributed to workshops and conferences for other professional groups.

From 1994 to 2002, she conducted research on the psychology of science communication, working with a number of interactive science centres, including the National Museum for Science and Technology in London, Techniquest in Cardiff, and the Centre for Life in Newcastle.

This research articulated the psychological mechanisms underlying customer engagement with interactive science exhibits, and showed how they produce outcomes in the cognitive, conative, affective, and behavioural domains. She has spoken on this area and presented the model at a number of national and international conferences, since which time it has been applied in both innovative and evaluative projects in science centres and other interactive arenas.

== Selected works ==
- Doing Psychological Research: Gathering and Analysing Data. Open University Press. 2000. ISBN 978-0-335-20379-6.
- A Little History of Psychology. Yale University Press. 2024. ISBN 978-0-300-26994-9.

== Awards ==
- 1985 - Honorary Life Member of the Association for the Teaching of Psychology.
- 1997 - British Psychological Society's Award for Distinguished Contributions to the Teaching of Psychology.
- 2022 - Elected as a fellow of the UK Academy of Social Sciences.
