= Edwin A. Peel =

British educational psychologist

Edwin Arthur Peel (1 March 1911 – 10 June 1992) was a British educational psychologist. He was professor of education, University of Birmingham, 1950–1978.
