= William Yule (psychologist) =

British psychologist (1940–2023)

- Born: 20 June 1940
- Died: 5 November 2023 (aged 83)

Academic background
- Education: University of London

Academic work
- Discipline: Developmental Psychology
- Institutions: Institute of Psychiatry

William Yule (20 June 1940 – 5 November 2023) was a British psychologist and professor emeritus of applied child psychology at King's College London.

== Life ==
William Yule was born on 20 June 1940. He graduated with an MA in psychology from the University of Aberdeen in 1962. He then moved to London where he completed his Dip. Psychol. at the Institute of Psychiatry followed by his PhD at the University of London.

Yule taught at the Institute of Education, University of London before returning to the Institute of Psychiatry from which he retired as Emeritus Professor.

Yule died on 5 November 2023, at the age of 83.

== Work ==
Yule was known, among other things, for his epidemiological studies and as an expert on paediatric traumatic stress disorder (PTSD). He worked as an expert psychologist and researcher in child mental health already after the Herald of Free Enterprise shipwreck (1987). He was a Unicef adviser on civil war in the former Yugoslavia. He also served on the British Health Expert Group, which helped find practical solutions to treat war-related trauma after the Sri Lankan civil war. He acted as an expert in launching post-disaster mental health services.

== Awards ==
- 2006 – Honorary Life Fellow, British Psychological Society
- 2007 – biennial Aristotle Prize of the European Federation of Psychological Associations (EFPA) in 2007.

== Works ==
He published more than 300 articles and nine books on the subject of child psychology.

- William Yule & Michael Rutter (ed., 1987 & 1991) Language Development and Disorders. London: Mac Keith Press.
- William Yule (1993) Wise Before the Event: Coping with Crises in Schools
- Gregory O'Brien & William Yule (ed., 1995) Behavioral phenotypes. London: Mac Keith Press.
- Stephen Joseph, Ruth Williams & William Yule (1997 & 1999) Understanding post-traumatic stress: a psychosocial perspective on PTSD and treatment. Chichester: Wiley.
- William Yule (1999) Post-Traumatic Stress Disorders: Concepts and Therapy. Chichester: Wiley.
- Atle Dyregrov & William Yule (2008) Grief in Young Children: A Handbook for Adults
- Clare Pallet, Kathy Blackeby, William Yule & Roger Weissman (2008) Managing Difficult Behaviour: A Handbook for Foster Carers of the Under 12s
- Thomas H. Ollendick, Neville J. King & William Yule (Editors, 1994 & 2013) International Handbook of Phobic and Anxiety Disorders in Children and Adolescents
- Atle Dyregrov. Magne Raundalen & William Yule (2018) What is Terrorism ?: A Book to Help Kids and Adults Talk about Terror Together
