= Wendy Hollway =

British psychologist

Wendy Ann Hollway (born 1949) is a British psychologist specialising in feminist psychology, social psychology and qualitative methods.

== Biography ==
Hollway was born in New Manchester in 1949. She studied psychology at the University of Sheffield, graduating in 1971, and obtained a postgraduate certificate from Newcastle University in 1972. She then worked as a lecturer and was awarded a PhD by the University of London in 1982. Over her career, Hollway has held positions at the University of Bristol, Birkbeck College, the University of Bradford, and the University of Leeds. She is currently an Emeritus Professor of Psychology at the Open University, which she joined in 2001.
