= Christopher M. Cullen =

American philosopher (born 1962)

Christopher Cullen
- Born: 1962 (age 63–64)

Education
- Education: Catholic University of America (PhD), Weston Jesuit School of Theology (STL, MDiv), Saint Louis University (MA), Georgetown University (AB)

Philosophical work
- Era: 21st-century philosophy
- Region: Western philosophy
- Institutions: Fordham University
- Main interests: medieval philosophy, ancient philosophy, just war theory, the problem of evil

Christopher M. Cullen, S.J. (born 1962) is an American philosopher and associate professor of philosophy at Fordham University. Cullen is known for his works on medieval philosophy. He is the editor-in-chief of International Philosophical Quarterly.

== Books ==
- Bonaventure, Oxford University Press, 2006
- Maritain and America, edited with Joseph Allan Clair, American Maritain Association (dist. by The Catholic University of America Press), 2009
