= Carolyn Kagan =

British community psychologist and activist (born 1960)

- Born: Meopham, Kent
- Education: North East London Polytechnic, University of Oxford
- Scientific career
- Fields: Community psychology
- Workplaces: Manchester Metropolitan University
- Thesis: Cognitive aspects of social skills training (1981)
- Doctoral advisor: Michael Argyle

Carolyn Kagan (born 1950) is a British community psychologist and social activist.

== Life and work ==
Carolyn Morag Kagan grew up in Meopham, Kent. After working as a residential social worker in Scotland, she went to North East London Polytechnic, graduating with a degree in Psychology in 1974. She then obtained a DPhil in Social Psychology from Wolfson College, University of Oxford.

In 1976, she was appointed to the Department of Psychology at Manchester Polytechnic (subsequently Manchester Metropolitan University), proceeding through the ranks of Lecturer, Senior Lecturer, Principal Lecturer and Professor. She is a qualified social worker and counselling psychologist. For ten years, she was Director of the Research Institute for Health and Social Change at MMU, which established a reputation for socially engaged research. She is currently Emerita Professor at MMU and a visiting professor at Edge Hill University.

As a community psychologist, she has worked closely with various community groups and been involved in various forms of social activism. She has been a Director of Just Psychology CIC (www.justpsychology.co.uk), From Generation to Generation, and Friends of Hough End Hall (www.houghendhall.org). She is also a trustee of the Richard Benjamin Trust (www.richardbenjamintrust.co.uk), a member of the Steady State Manchester collective, and Chair of Chorlton Voice (Chorlton Civic Society) and Chorlton Arts Festival.

== Publications ==
- Kagan C. et al. (Eds.) (2022). The Routledge International Handbook of Community Psychology. Routledge.
- Kagan, C., Burton, M. H., Duckett, P., Lawthom, R., & Siddiquee, A. (2019). Critical Community Psychology: Critical Action and Social Change. (2nd ed) ROUTLEDGE.
- Kagan, C. and Diamond, J. (2019). University–Community Relations in the UK. Palgrave-Macmillan
- Kagan, C., Burton, M., Duckett, P., Lawthom, R., & Siddiquee, A (2011). Critical Community Psychology. Wiley-Blackwell.
- Burton, M., Kagan, C., & Clements, P. (1995). Social Skills for People With Learning Disabilities. Nelson Thornes.

== Awards ==
- 1987 Liverpool University Penelope Hall Prize (for outstanding work in social work training )
- 2005 British Psychological Society Award for Promoting Equal Opportunity (for the development of academic and research alliances)
- 2006 Fellowship, Society Community Research and Action (SCRA) (for internationally renowned work in community psychology)
- 2017 Honorary Fellowship, British Psychological Society
