= Charles Wilfred Valentine =

British educationalist and psychologist

Charles Wilfred Valentine (16 August 1879 – 26 May 1964) was a British educationalist and psychologist.

He was a student at Cambridge University and there befriended William Gidley Emmett with whom he later co-wrote a book, The Reliability of Examinations in 1932, which questioned the value of traditional testing and helped create a foundation for alternative test methods.

Valentine was President of the British Psychology Society in 1947–48 and became an Honorary Fellow of the Society in 1958.

== Bibliography ==
- Dreams and the Unconscious an Introduction to the Study of Psycho-analysis (2010), ISBN 978-1-141-38370-2, ISBN 1-141-38370-5, first published in 1922 by Macmillan.
- An Introduction to Experimental Psychology in Relation to Education, (2009), BiblioBazaar, ISBN 978-1-4590-3247-7, ISBN 1-4590-3247-0, first published in 1916 by Warwick & Yor Inc.
- The Normal child and some of his abnormalities (1963), Pelican Books.
- Experimental Psychology of Beauty (1962), Methuen.
- Parents and children: A first book on the psychology of child development and training (1955)
- The Difficult Child and the Problem of Discipline, (1947), Methuen.
- The human factor in the army;: Some applications of psychology to training, selection, morale and discipline (1945)
- Principles of army instruction: with special reference to elementary weapon training (1943)
- The Psychology of Early Childhood. A study of mental development in the first years of life (1942), Methuen.
- Latin: its place and value in education, (1935)
