= Nikki Hayes (singer) =

American singer-songwriter

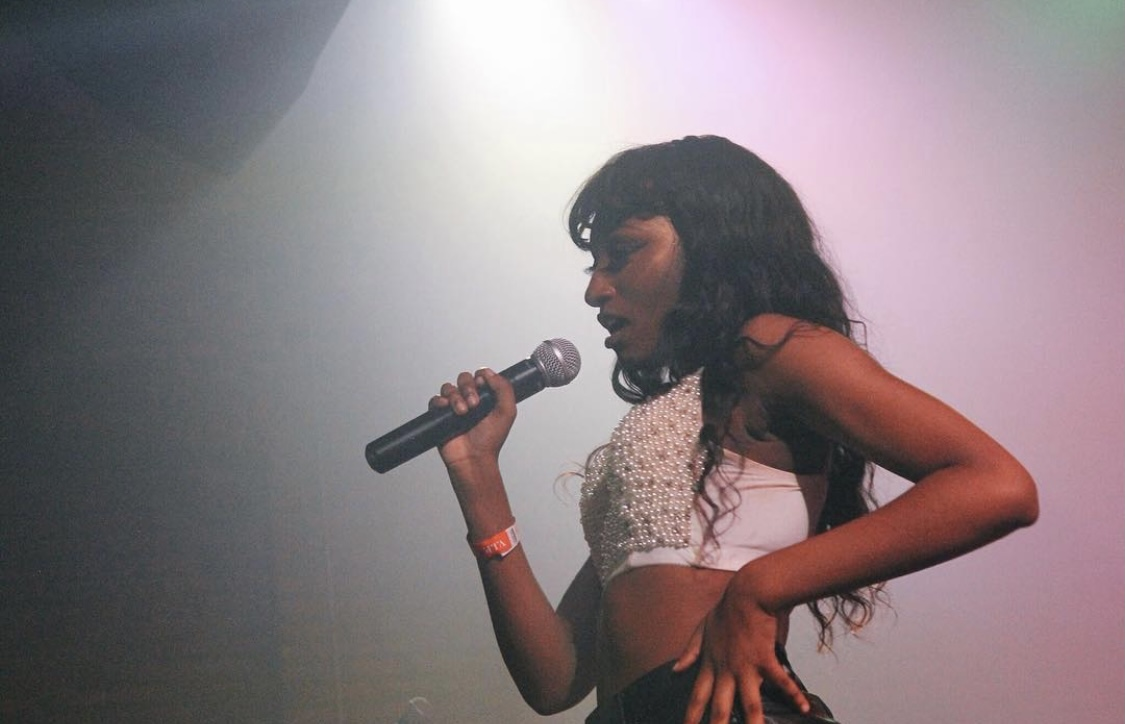
- Nikki Hayes performing in 2016

Background information
- Born: Nicole Ashley Hayes; September 27, 1995 (age 30); Chicago, Illinois, U.S.
- Genres: R&B; Pop; Soul
- Years active: 2018-present
- Labels: ESI Records
- Website: itsnikkihayes.com

Nicole Ashley Hayes, known professionally as Nikki Hayes, is an American R&B singer, songwriter, and dancer based in Arizona.

== Early life ==
Nicole Ashley Hayes was born on September 27, 1995, in Chicago, Illinois. When she was 6 years old, she studied dance at Studio One Dance Academy in Chicago, and went on to join the choir and dance team at St. Sabina Academy. Before entering her teenaged years, she joined Walt Whitman and The Soul Children of Chicago. She has since studied Jazz, West African, Ballet and Modern dance styles, before electing to start her solo singing career.

== Career ==
In the early stages of her career, Nikki Hayes placed in the final five of Grammy Award winning producer Kuk Harrell's “Who's Next? Worldwide Online Talent Search”.

In 2018, Nikki Hayes released her first single, “Move”, which earned her a nomination for an Independent Music Award for Best Song - R&B/Soul, and a feature on Tyler Perry's Sistas soundtrack, as well as a spot on The CW's All American and ABC's For Life.

Her second single “Stingray” was released in April 2019. and was followed that September by "Together", which was featured on TNT's Claws. 2020 began with the release of "Gotta Go To Sleep", and most recently "Sweet".

== Musical style and influences ==
Nikki Hayes' musical style has been described as R&B and Soul, and has cited as musical and career influences Whitney Houston, Toni Braxton, Stevie Wonder, and Beyoncé.

== Discography ==
=== Singles ===
| Title | Year |
|---|---|
| "Move" | 2018 |
| "Stingray" | 2019 |
| "Together" | 2019 |
| "Gotta Go To Sleep" | 2020 |
| "Sweet" | 2020 |

=== Music videos ===
| Title | Year | Director | Ref. |
|---|---|---|---|
| "Move" | 2019 | Ronald Jusayan | |
| "Stingray" | 2019 | Braden Young | |

== Awards and nominations ==
| Year | Association | Category | Nominated work | Result |
|---|---|---|---|---|
| 2019 | Independent Music Award | R&B/Soul | Move | Nominated |
