= George Westby =

British psychologist

- Education: University of Oxford
- Scientific career
- Fields: Psychology
- Workplaces: University of Hull, University of Cardiff

George Westby (1909–1984) was a British psychologist who played an important role in establishing the discipline at the University College Hull and the University College Cardiff.

== Career ==
Westby read philosophy, politics and economics at University of Oxford and then worked in a variety of roles before returning to that university and obtaining a Diploma in Psychology under the guidance of Oliver Zangwill.

In 1946, he was appointed as the first lecturer in psychology at University College Hull. Here he rapidly offered an undergraduate degree in psychology and led the development of a separate department.

In 1962, he moved to University College Cardiff as the first Chair of Psychology. His inaugural lecture on behaviour theories was published by the University of Wales (Westby, 1963). He also co-edited a book on computers in psychology (Apter & Westby, 1973).

He was active in the British Psychological Society becoming its president in 1967. His presidential address provides further details of his career. In his address he emphasised the importance of grasping the philosophical assumptions of the discipline. He said: 'philosophy, as the logic of inquiry, is the seminal methodological discipline of all the conventionally separated and contrasted sciences and arts'(p. 7).

== Publications ==
- Westby, G. (1963). Behaviour Theories and the Status of Psychology.
- Westby, G. (1966). Psychology today: problems and directions.
- Apter, M.J., & Westby, G. (eds) (1973) The Computer in Psychology.

== Honours ==
- 1965 - 1966 - President, British Psychological Society
