= Edgar Miller (psychologist) =

British psychologist (1939–2015)

- Born: Edgar Miller; 1939
- Died: 2015 (aged 75–76)
- Education: University of Hull
- Scientific career
- Fields: Clinical psychology
- Workplaces: University of Hull, University of Southampton, University of Leicester

Edgar Miller (1939–2015) was a British clinical psychologist who played an important role in developing training in clinical psychology in Britain.

== Life and career ==
Edgar Miller graduated in psychology from the University of Hull followed by training in clinical psychology at the Institute of Psychiatry. He returned to Hull as a lecturer and then moved to the new medical school at the University of Southampton as a senior lecturer. He then took up a post as clinical psychologist in Cambridge from which he was seconded to work as an advisor in the Department of Health. Finally, in 1992 he was appointed Chair of Clinical Psychology at the University of Leicester where he stayed until he retired in 2004. At Leicester he led the development of the training programme in clinical psychology.

He was active in the British Psychological Society, of which he was elected president in 1992. His Presidential Address entitled Psychological treatment: nineteenth century style reviewed the historical forebears of clinical psychology. It emphasised the importance of adopting a historical perspective in both the discipline and the profession.

== Publications ==
- Miller, E., & Morley, S. (1986) Investigating Abnormal Behaviour. Psychology Press.

== Awards ==
- 1992 – 1993 - President, British Psychological Society
