= Peter Harzem =

American/Turkish psychologist (1930-2008)

- Born: January 5, 1930; Istanbul, Turkey
- Died: May 26, 2008 (aged 78); Auburn, Alabama, US
- Education: University of London; Bangor University
- Scientific career
- Fields: Psychology, behaviourism
- Workplaces: Bangor University; Auburn University
- Doctoral advisor: Harry Hurwitz

Peter Harzem (January 5, 1930 – May 26, 2008) was a Turkish-American psychologist who specialised in the field of behavior analysis.

== Life ==
Peter Harzem was born in Istanbul, Turkey, on January 5, 1930. His parents were Sukru and Saime Harzem. He initially worked as a newspaper reporter.

After the war he moved to London to complete his education. He was awarded a BSc Psychology from the University of London. He was strongly influenced by Harry Hurwitz who had established an operant laboratory at Birkbeck College. Harzem conducted a student project in this laboratory.

He then moved to the University College of North Wales which later became Bangor University where he completed his PhD and obtained a faculty position.

He moved to the United States in 1978 where he became Hudson Professor of Psychology at Auburn University, Alabama.

He died on May 26, 2008.

== Work ==
Harzem established a reputation for his work on behaviour analysis. At Bangor University, he published an influential volume (Harzem & Miles, 1978). He was also concerned with the role of language. In his later years he became interested in what he termed the discrediting of John B. Watson (Harzem, 1993; 2001). Following on from Hurwitz, Harzen had a continuing interest in the nature of science (Harzem, 2007).

== Positions ==
- Associate editor, Journal of the Experimental Analysis of Behavior.

== Publications ==
- Harzem P. (2007). A brief history of knowledge: Science and non-science in the understanding of human nature. In: Ribes-Inesta E, Burgos J.E, editors. Knowledge, cognition, and behavior: Proceedings of the ninth Biannual Symposium on the Science of Behavior. Guadalajara, Mexico: Universidad de Guadalajara. pp. 11–30.
- Harzen, P.E. (2004). Behaviorism for new psychology: What was wrong with behaviorism and what is wrong with it now. Behavior and Philosophy, 32, 5–12.
- Harzen, P.E. (2001). The Intellectual Dismissal of John B. Watson: Notes on a Dark Cloud in the History of the Psychological Sciences. Behavioral Development Bulletin, 10(1), 15–16.
- Harzem, P. (1993). The discrediting of John Broadus Watson. Mexican Journal of Behavior Analysis, 19, 39–66.
- Zeiler M.D, Harzem P. (Eds.) (1983). Biological factors in learning. New York: Wiley.
- Harzem, P.E. (Ed.)(1981). Predictability, Correlation, and Contiguity New York: Wiley
- Zeiler M.D, Harzem P. (Eds.) (1979). Reinforcement and the organization of behavior. New York: Wiley.
- Harzem, P.E., & Miles, T.R. (1978) Conceptual Issues In Operant Psychology. Chichester: Wiley.
