= Albert William Wolters =

British psychologist

Albert William Phillip Wolters
- Born: 1883
- Died: 1961 (aged 77–78)

Academic work
- Discipline: Psychology
- Institutions: University of Reading

Albert William Phillip Wolters (1883–1961) was a British psychologist.

== History ==
Wolters spent most of his academic career at the University of Reading. He was initially appointed as a lecturer in the Department of Education in 1908. Here he taught courses in Philosophy and Social Institutions. In 1910 he began teaching psychology and he convinced the university authorities to provide him with facilities to establish a psychological laboratory and subsequently a department of psychology. He was made Professor of Psychology and then Deputy Vice-Chancellor of the university.

The School of Psychology and Clinical Language Sciences have established a Walter Wolters Visiting Distinguished Professorship. These have been presented by such international figures as Noam Chomsky and Daniel Dennett.

== Publications ==
Wolters, A.W.P. (1933). The Evidence of our Senses. London: Methuen.

== Awards ==
- 1955 - Honorary Fellow, British Psychological Society
