= Margaret Donaldson =

British psychologist (1926–2020)

- Born: 16 June 1926
- Died: 16 September 2020 (aged 94); Edinburgh, Scotland

Academic background
- Education: University of Edinburgh
- Thesis: Relevance to the theory of intelligence testing of the study of errors in thinking (1956)

Academic work
- Discipline: Psychology
- Sub-discipline: Developmental psychology
- Institutions: University of Edinburgh
- Notable works: Children's Minds; Human Minds

Margaret Caldwell Donaldson (or Salter; 16 June 1926 – 16 September 2020) was a professor of developmental psychology at the University of Edinburgh.

Donaldson was educated at the University of Edinburgh, where she gained a Ph.D. in 1956 and continued as a teacher after graduating. She traveled to Memphis Tennessee to guest-lecture and teach at Rhodes College (then Southwestern) during the 1962–1963 school year. In 1980, she was appointed professor of developmental psychology. Her main research interest has always been in the study of human thought and language. At Edinburgh, Professor Donaldson oversaw the development of research in developmental psychology and psycholinguistics.

At an early stage in her career, she spent some time at Jean Piaget's research institute in Geneva, and was much influenced by that experience, though she later came to question some important aspects of Piagetian theory. She spent a year in the United States as the holder of a John Hay Whitney Fellowship, and has also worked there with Jerome Bruner on curriculum development projects.

Donaldson authored A Study of Children's Thinking and Children's Minds. Along with Robert Grieve and Chris Pratt, she edited a book of readings entitled Early Childhood Development and Education. Jerome Bruner described Donaldson's Children's Minds as "One of the most powerful, most wisely balanced and best informed books on the development of the child's mind to have appeared in twenty years. Its implications for education are enormous."

== Publications ==
- Children's Minds, London: Fontana/Croom Helm, 1978, ISBN 0-85664-759-4
- Human Minds, London: Allen Lane, 1992, ISBN 0-7139-9081-3
