= Hendrik Zwaardemaker =

Dutch physiologist (1857–1930)

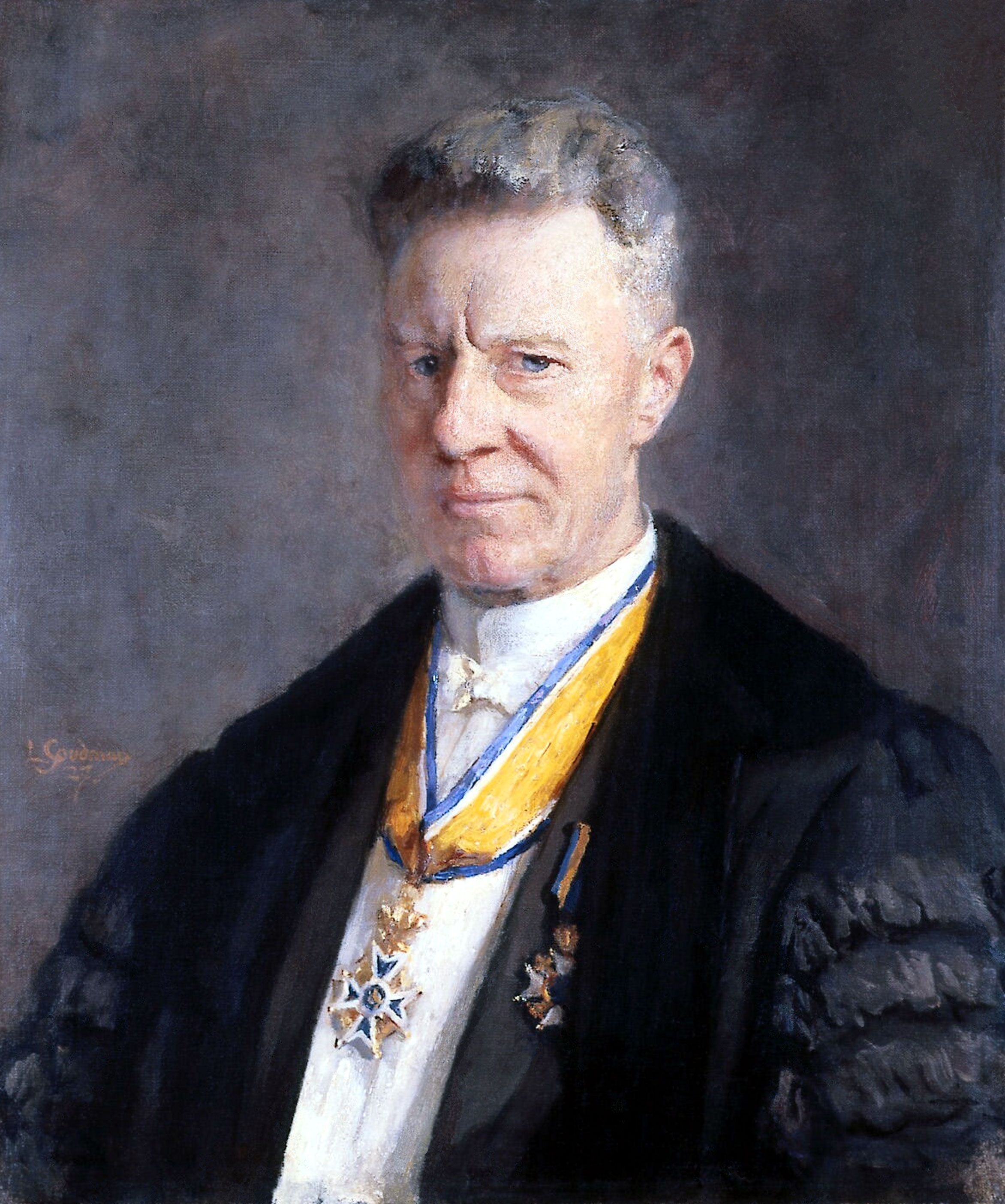
- Born: 10 May 1857; Haarlem, Netherlands
- Died: 19 September 1930 (aged 73); Utrecht
- Scientific career
- Fields: Physiology
- Institutions: University of Utrecht

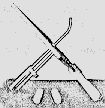
An illustration of Zwaardemaker's olfactometer

Hendrik Zwaardemaker (10 May 1857 – 19 September 1930) was a Dutch scientist who invented the olfactometer in 1888.

From 1897 to 1927 he was professor of Experimental Physiology at the University of Utrecht. In 1903 he became member of the Royal Netherlands Academy of Arts and Sciences. In addition to his work on the sense of smell, he also conducted research on the human heart. He found that salts of potassium and other radioactive elements stimulated the heart. His major work was "Die Physiologie des Geruchs" (Physiologie of Olfaction), it appeared in 1895.

== Zwaardemaker Pairs ==
An important contribution of Zwaardemaker's studies is the concept of odor conjugates. Zwaardemaker discovered that certain odors could be prevented from detection by smell senses when mixed with various essential oils. These combination of odors are referred to as Zwaardemaker Pairs, (or Z-pairs).

Offensive Odor	Common Odor Sources	Z-Pair Essential Oil	Active Ingredient
Butyric acid	Vomit, Flesh Decomposition, Rancid Dairy Products	Juniper Oil	
Chlorine		Vanilla	Vanillin
Ammonia	Urine	Rose Oil	Ionone
Tobacco	Cigarette Smoke	Wintergreen Oil	Methyl salicylate
	Musk	Bitter Almond oil	Benzaldehyde
	Rubber	Cedar Oil	
Skatole	Feces, Coal tar	Cedar Oil	
Mercaptan	Natural Gas	Eucalyptus Oil	Eucalyptol
