= Brian Foss (psychologist) =

British psychologist (1921–1997)

- Born: 25 October 1921; Whittlesey, Cambridgeshire
- Died: 23 December 1997 (aged 76); London

Academic work
- Discipline: Psychology
- Sub-discipline: Educational Psychology
- Institutions: Bedford College

Brian Malzard Foss (25 October 1921 – 23 December 1997) was a British psychologist. Brian Foss was an academic psychologist. He was born in Whittlesey, Cambridgeshire on 25 October 1921. He died in London on 23 December 1997.

His academic career began in 1948 as a lecturer at Institute of Experimental Psychology at University of Oxford, where he stayed until 1951. Following that he served as a lecturer at Birkbeck College, London from 1951–1964. He became Professor of Educational Psychology at Institute of Education, London from 1964–1968, and Professor of Psychology at Bedford College, London from 1968–85, Royal Holloway and Bedford New College, London from 1985–1987.
