= Social Policy Association =

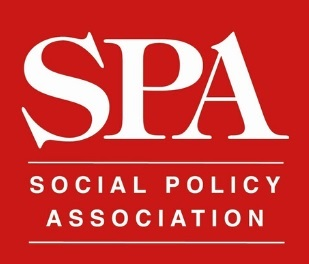
- Abbreviation: SPA
- Formation: 1967
- Type: Learned society
- Legal status: Registered charity no: 528347
- Purpose: To advance education and learning, and in particular to advance the teaching, research and dissemination of knowledge, in the field of social policy and administration.
- Headquarters: 10 Queen Street Place, London, EC4R 1BE, UK
- President: Ruth Lister, Baroness Lister of Burtersett (until July 2021)
- Chair: Karen Rowlingson
- Website: www.social-policy.org.uk

The Social Policy Association (SPA) is the United Kingdom's professional association for teachers, researchers, students and practitioners of social policy. It works to promote the discipline, encourage public awareness of social policy research, liaise with relevant public bodies and higher education institutions, and facilitate the impact of research on public debates and social policy.

Founded in 1967 as the Social Administration Association, the SPA adopted its current name in 1987, reflecting the changing nature of the discipline and profession. It produces three academic journals: Journal of Social Policy, Social Policy and Society, and Journal of International and Comparative Social Policy published by Cambridge University Press.

The SPA is a membership organisation and membership is open to anyone with an interest in the social policy field. Members pay an annual fee, with the cost varying according to income bands and their country of residence. Benefits include subscriptions to the SPA's journals, discounted registration for its conference and the ability to apply for grants. Members are also eligible for nomination to the society's awards, which have been given out annually since 2006.

The SPA is a member learned society of the Academy of Social Sciences. It is one of the UK Government's approved professional organisations and learned societies for tax purposes.

== History ==
Social administration as a discipline emerged in Britain in the mid twentieth century and expanded alongside the growth of the welfare state, especially in the period after the Second World War. In universities, it was initially a vocational subject focused on training social workers, and also became a form of a training for people employed in social services. Among its early proponents were Richard Titmuss and Brian Abel-Smith. The expansion of higher education in the 1960s allowed for the profession and the discipline to grow. In 1967, the Social Administration Association was founded as a professional association. It launched its own journal, Journal of Social Policy, in 1972.

Across the 1970s, scholars argued that social administration needed to incorporate more theory, move away from studying the details of administration, and bring in concepts from other disciplines like sociology. It became less vocationally-orientated and more academic; the diplomas previously awarded were gradually replaced by full degrees; and some universities abandoned vocational teaching altogether. Increasingly, to recognise the more academic focus, university departments began to incorporate social policy, rather than administration, in their names. It became common for academics appointed to professorships of social administration to request the chair be renamed "Professor of Social Policy".

In 1987, the Social Administration Association changed its name to the Social Policy Association. It was criticised by Howard Glennerster (the professor of social administration at the London School of Economics) for playing down the value of examining bureaucratic welfare administration, but Gilbert Smith (the professor of social administration at the University of Hull) defended the decision and the state of the discipline.

== Aims and objectives ==
As of 2021, the SPA aims to promote social policy as an academic subject by supporting research and teaching; it also works to increase public awareness of the discipline and help research have an impact on social policy and public debates. To this end, it consults with higher education providers and research institutions, and liaises with the Economic and Social Research Council. For members, it aims to provide a forum for discussion and a means of keeping up-to-date with changes in the discipline abroad and in the UK.

== Membership ==
Membership is open to people from any country. Individual members pay an annual fee of £40–125, depending on their annual income (or £10 for people in countries classified by the SPA as belonging to the global "economic south"). Public-sector and third-sector organisations may apply for institutional membership, charged at £100 annually (or discounted to £50 for those in the "economic south"). Membership benefits include subscriptions to the SPA's three academic journals and its Social Policy Review, as well as discounted registration for the SPA's conferences, discounts for some other academic journals in the field, the ability to apply for grants, and eligibility for nominations to the society's awards. Most of the SPA's members are teachers and researchers in the field, usually based in UK universities. There is a growing number of members from outside the UK.

== Chairs and Presidents ==
David Donnison was the first chair of the association, The current SPA Chair is Prof. Karen Rowlingson and the current SPA President is Baroness Ruth Lister.

== Publications ==
The SPA publishes the following peer-reviewed academic journals published by Cambridge University Press: Journal of Social Policy, Social Policy and Society, and Journal of International and Comparative Social Policy.

The SPA has a long-standing relationship with Policy Press, including three-book series: Social Policy Review, Understanding Welfare, and Research in Comparative and Global Social Policy.

== Awards ==
The SPA makes awards which recognise academics and teachers operating in the field of social policy, and those who have social policy academic work to increase public awareness of social policy.

=== Special or International Recognition Awards ===
The Association gives out its Special Recognition Award (SPA) on an annual basis to people who are due to retire within a year or who have already retired from the academic profession and who has either "made a sustained contribution to research in the field of social policy", "made a sustained contribution to teaching and learning of the subject ...", "had a sustained impact on political process/discourse ...", or "achieved esteem measured in terms of journal editing/establishing, promotion of social policy within other social sciences, membership of research councils or similar bodies." The Special Recognition Award was last given out in 2017 but since 2016 the Association has also made an International Special Recognition Award to recognise scholars outside the United Kingdom. This continues to be awarded as of 2019.

- 2019: Nick Ellison (International Recognition Award).
- 2018: Tess Ridge (International Recognition Award) and Aditya Chakrabortty (Public Recognition Award).
- 2017: Pete Alcock (Special Recognition Award) and Wolfgang Streeck (International Special Recognition Award).
- 2016: John Clarke and Gillian Parker. The International Special Recognition Award has given out for the first time, to Kathryn Edin.
- 2015: Lesley Doyal; Rudolf Klein; Robert Pinker.
- 2014: Gary Craig; Caroline Glendinning; John Veit-Wilson.
- 2013: Peter Taylor-Gooby; Ian Gough; Bob Deacon.
- 2012: Alan Deacon; David Byrne; Fiona Williams; Nicholas Deakin.

=== Lifetime Achievement Award ===
Before 2012, the SPA made Lifetime Achievement Awards to academics. The first of these was awarded in 2006 to Adrian Sinfield. The last award was handed out in 2011.

- 2011: Jane Lewis.
- 2010: Jan Pahl and Ruth Lister (University of Loughborough).
- 2009: Michael Hill.
- 2008: David Donnison; Peter Townsend.
- 2007: Jonathan Bradshaw; Hilary Land; Alan Walker.
- 2006: Adrian Sinfield.

=== Outstanding Contribution from a Non-Academic Award/Best Non-Academic Award ===
This was last awarded in 2015.

- 2015: Rev. Paul Nicolson (awarded as Best Non-Academic Award).
- 2014: Anna Coote (New Economics Foundation); Carey Oppenheim (Early Intervention Foundation) (awarded as Best Non-Academic Award).
- 2012: Richard Best, Baron Best, OBE.
- 2011: Simon Duffy; Dexter Whitfield.
- 2010: Karl Wilding and the Research Team at the National Council for Voluntary Organisations.
- 2009: Patricia Hollis.
- 2008: Katherine Rake.
