= Department of Social Policy and Intervention, University of Oxford =

Research centre

Coordinates: 51°45′21″N 1°15′05″W

Department of Social Policy and Intervention
- Established: 1914
- Affiliations: University of Oxford
- Academic staff: 40
- Postgraduates: 35 CSP, 30 EBSIPE
- Doctoral students: 55
- Location: Oxford, England
- Head of Department: Jane Barlow

The Department of Social Policy and Intervention is an academic department at the Social Sciences Division at the University of Oxford in Oxford, England, United Kingdom.

It focuses on the research and teaching in social policy and the systematic evaluation of social intervention. It dates back to Barnett House, a social reform initiative founded in 1914 by a reform movement clergyman, Samuel Barnett (known as Canon Barnett), becoming a department of Oxford in 1961.

The department hosts two main research units: the Oxford Institute of Social Policy (OISP) and the Centre for Evidence-Based Social Intervention (CEBI).

In 2021 Professor Jane Barlow followed Professor Bernhard Ebbinghaus as head of department.

== Research ==
The department was ranked first among all social policy departments in the Research Excellence Framework 2014, which assess the research performance of institutions of higher education in the UK, with 79% of its research classified as world-leading. The Department of Social Policy and Intervention is a multidisciplinary centre of excellence for research in social policy and the development and systematic evaluation of social interventions. Within the department, research is organised around two main units:

- The Centre for Evidence-Based Intervention (CEBI)
- The Oxford Institute of Social Policy (OISP)

Whilst the majority of work is focused on OECD countries, faculty members also address important social policy issues in developing countries. The academic backgrounds of members of staff in the department include anthropology, demography, economics, health services research, political science, psychology, social policy, social work and sociology. The substantive focus of research in the department covers a wide range of policy areas including; Children and Families, Family Policies, Health Policy, Education Policy and Social Policy, Pensions, Poverty and Social Exclusion, Welfare and Work, Demographic and Population based problems and a wide range of social and psycho-social interventions. Whilst the majority of work is focused on OECD countries, faculty members also address important social policy issues in developing countries.

== Teaching ==
The department offers teaching on two core graduate study tracts: Comparative Social Policy (MSc and MPhil) and Evidence Based Social Intervention and Policy Evaluation (MSc and MPhil). Research courses are offered in Social Policy and Social Intervention (DPhil). Additionally the department provides teaching on the undergraduate Politics, Philosophy and Economics course.

== Notable people ==
Notable former heads of department have included Leonard Barnes, A. H. Halsey, Stein Ringen, Martin Seeleib-Kaiser and Bernhard Ebbinghaus.

The Barnett Professor of Social Policy is based in the department. Notable academics have included:

- Mary Daly, Professor of Sociology and Social Policy since 2012
- Jane Lewis, Barnett Professor of Social Policy from 2000 to 2004
