= Barnett Professor of Social Policy =

The Barnett Professorship of Social Policy is the chair in social policy at the University of Oxford. It was established in 1999 and is named for Canon Samuel Barnett. The chair is based in the Department of Social Policy and Intervention and its holder is elected to a Fellowship of St Cross College, Oxford.

== List of Barnett Professors of Social Policy ==
- 2000 to 2004: Jane Lewis
- 2006 to 2013: Peter Kemp
- 2013 to 2017: Martin Seeleib-Kaiser
- Since 2023: Kenneth Nelson
