= Peter Kemp =

Peter Kemp may refer to:

- Peter Kemp (civil servant) (1934–2008), British civil servant
- Peter Kemp (rower) (1853–1921), Australian rower
- Peter Kemp (social scientist) (born 1955), British social scientist
- Peter Kemp (swimmer) (1877–1965), British Olympic swimmer and water polo player
- Peter Kemp (writer) (1913–1993), English soldier and writer
