= Political party (disambiguation) =

A political party is an organized group of people who share an ideology, political positions, or adherence to a central political figure, and who field candidates for elections in an attempt to implement a political agenda.

Political party or political parties may also refer to:

- Party Politics, a peer-reviewed academic journal that publishes political science research
- Party Politics (horse) (1984–2009), a racehorse
- Political Parties, a 1911 book by Robert Michels
