= Jan Pahl =

British social researcher

Jan Pahl (born 22 September 1937) is a British academic and social researcher, known for her work in social policy, particularly in the fields of family finance, domestic violence, and social care. She is Professor Emeritus of Social Policy at the University of Kent and has been active in research, policy development, and civic life for over five decades. Pahl was appointed a Commander of the Order of the British Empire (CBE).

== Education and career ==
Pahl studied Historical Geography at the University of Cambridge and began her academic career at the University of Kent in 1976.

Her early work focused on violence against women and on the control of money within families and was supported by multiple grants from various funding bodies. In 1985, she transitioned to research roles within the National Health Service, and by 1990 she had become Director of Research at the National Institute for Social Work. In 1995, she returned to the University of Kent as Professor of Social Policy, where she remained until her retirement and was named Professor Emeritus in 2002.

She has held professional and editorial roles, including co-editing the Journal of Social Policy (2002–2007) and consulting on the implementation of research ethics in social care for the Department of Health. In recognition of her service, she was awarded a CBE in 2011, a Lifetime Achievement Award by the Social Policy Association in 2010, and was named an Academician of the Academy of Social Sciences in 2008. She received an honorary Doctor of Letters (DLitt) from the University of Kent in 2015 as part of its 50th anniversary celebrations.

== Scholarly works and research ==
Among her works are Money and Marriage (1989) and Invisible Money: Family Finances in the Electronic Economy (1999), which explored the control and allocation of money within households. Her research on domestic violence, particularly through her book Private Violence and Public Policy (1985), brought her recognition at the national and international levels, including invitations to participate in Expert Group Meetings conferences organized by the United Nations and the World Health Organization.

Beyond academia, Pahl has been a leading figure in community engagement. She helped to revive the Canterbury Society in 2009, aiming to improve the quality of life in Canterbury through historic preservation, green space protection, and sustainable urban development. She served as Chair of the Society for ten years and now acts as its Vice President, supporting its committee and civic initiatives.

She has participated in local community campaigns, including a project involving research on poverty that led to initiatives related to food access and social security benefits. She has also been involved in a campaign concerning Old Park, an area noted for its wildlife and historical significance, which has been the subject of proposed development.

Her ongoing work reflects a sustained commitment to inclusive cities and the well-being of local communities, aligning with international goals such as the UN's Sustainable Development Goal 1 on eliminating poverty and Target 5.2 on eliminating violence against women and girls.

== Selected publications ==
Books

- Pahl, Jan (1999-10-01). Invisible Money: Family Finances in the Electronic Economy. Policy Press. ISBN 978-1-86134-158-7.
- Pahl, Jan (1989), "Money and power in marriage", Money and Marriage, London: Macmillan Education UK, pp. 168–179, doi:10.1007/978-1-349-20268-3_9 (inactive 29 July 2025), ISBN 978-0-333-38768-9
- Pahl, Jan (October 10, 2017). Private Violence and Public Policy. Routledge. ISBN 9781138673212.
- Pahl, J. M. (1978). A refuge for battered women: a study of the rôle of a women's centre. Great Britain. London: H.M.S.O. ISBN 978-0-11-320350-5.

Book Chapters

- Pahl, Jan M.; Hasanbegovic, Claudia; Yu, Mei-Kuei (2004), George, Vic; Page, Robert (eds.), Globalisation and family violence, London, UK: Polity Press, pp. 142–159, ISBN 978-0-7456-2952-0
- Pahl, J. M.; Vickerstaff, S. (2011). "The family and welfare". In Baldock, John; Manning, C (eds.). Social Policy. OUP Oxford. pp. 159–193. ISBN 9780199570843.

Journal Articles

- Pahl, Jan (2008-04-01). "Family finances, individualisation, spending patterns and access to credit". The Journal of Socio-Economics. Special Issue on the Household Economy. 37 (2): 577–591. doi:10.1016/j.socec.2006.12.041. ISSN 1053-5357.
- Pahl, Jan (2005). "Individualisation in Couple Finances: Who Pays for the Children?". Social Policy and Society. 4 (4): 381–391. doi:10.1017/S1474746405002575. ISSN 1475-3073.
- Pahl, Jan (2000-10-01). "Couples and their money: patterns of accounting and accountability in the domestic economy". Accounting, Auditing & Accountability Journal. 13 (4): 502–517. doi:10.1108/09513570010338078. ISSN 1368-0668.
- Pahl, Jan M. (2000-01-01). "The gendering of spending within households". Radical Statistics. 75: 38–48. ISSN 0268-6376.
- Balloch, S.; Pahl, J.; Mclean, J. (1998-06-01). "Working in the Social Services: Job Satisfaction, Stress and Violence". British Journal of Social Work. 28 (3): 329–350. doi:10.1093/oxfordjournals.bjsw.a011343. ISSN 0045-3102.
- Pahl, Jan (1995-09-01). "His money, her money: Recent research on financial organisation in marriage". Journal of Economic Psychology. 16 (3): 361–376. doi:10.1016/0167-4870(95)00015-G. ISSN 0167-4870.
- Vogler, Carolyn; Pahl, Jan (1994-05-01). "Money, Power and Inequality within Marriage". The Sociological Review. 42 (2): 263–288. doi:10.1111/j.1467-954X.1994.tb00090.x. ISSN 0038-0261.
- Vogler, Carolyn; Pahl, Jan (1993). "Social and Economic Change and the Organisation of Money within Marriage". Work, Employment and Society. 7 (1): 71–95. doi:10.1177/095001709371004. ISSN 0950-0170.
- Quine, Lyn; Pahl, Jan (1992). "Growing up with severe learning difficulties: A longitudinal study of young people and their families". Journal of Community & Applied Social Psychology. 2 (1): 1–16. doi:10.1002/casp.2450020102. ISSN 1099-1298.

== See also ==
- 2011 Birthday Honours
- Social Policy Association
- National Institute for Social Work
