= Global Social Policy =

- Discipline: Social policy
- Language: English
- Edited by: Gerard Boychuk, Rianne Mahon, Stephen McBride

Publication details
- History: 2001-present
- Publisher: SAGE Publications
- Frequency: Triannually

Standard abbreviations
- ISO 4: Glob. Soc. Policy

Indexing
- ISSN: 1468-0181 (print); 1741-2803 (web)
- OCLC no.: 216423580

Links
- Journal homepage; Online access; Online archive

Global Social Policy is a triannual peer-reviewed academic journal that covers social policy, especially its transnational aspects. The editors-in-chief are Gerard Boychuk (Balsillie School of International Affairs), Rianne Mahon (Balsillie School of International Affairs), and Stephen McBride (McMaster University). It was established in 2001 with Bob Deacon (University of Sheffield) as its founding editor and is published by SAGE Publications.

== Abstracting and indexing ==
The journal is abstracted and indexed in the International Bibliography of the Social Sciences and Scopus.
