= The Perfect Dictatorship: China in the 21st Century =

2016 book by Stein Ringen

- Author: Stein Ringen
- Language: English
- Genre: Nonfiction
- Publisher: Hong Kong University Press
- Publication date: 2016
- Publication place: Norway
- Media type: Print
- Pages: 208
- ISBN: 9888208942

The Perfect Dictatorship: China in the 21st Century is a 2016 book of Political Philosophy by the Norwegian sociologist Stein Ringen concerning the rule and nature of the Chinese Communist Party (CCP). In the book, he argues that the Chinese Communist Party created “a system that is unlike any other, a dictatorship that works to perfection.” The book also covers the ideological transformation and social control policies that have intensified under CCP general secretary Xi Jinping.

== Synopsis ==
Ringen tries to question the purpose of the party-state itself and the extent and importance of ideology in Chinese governance. The basis of his observation is that China is neither an authoritarian state, and neither is it a dictatorship, the former having too soft of connotations, and the latter implying a too crude of a regime, traditionally simply in place to support the interests of a privileged class, like a class of landowners. He argues that it is a party-state – a 'controlocracy'. A system of two, intertwined bureaucracies, where the state controls society, and the party controls the state. "There is a double system of control. Control is this state’s nature. If it were not for a determination to control, there would be no rationale for the double system. And once there is a party-state, the determination to control is a given."

Ringen tests three possible hypotheses to explain the possible reasoning for this control over society: the welfare state hypothesis, which assumes that the party has this vast amount of control to ideologically benefit its citizens; the trivial state hypothesis, which says that a state constituted as a party-state has turned away from ideology and made self-preservation its purpose and a power state hypothesis, which assumes that the state and its strength exist for a higher purpose, which is defined by an official ideology. Ringen states that the Chinese state is 'trivial', with no genuine purpose except to perpetuate itself indefinitely - something he believes is likely to continue. Ringen further shows concern at the fusion of the personal and national will in nationalist ideology, propagated by the state.

=== Controlocracy ===
Ringen uses the term controlocracy in an attempt to more accurately describe the General secretaryship of Xi Jinping and argues that this way of governance has been reshaped into a new regime that is radically stricter and more ideological than ever before. Ringen speaks of the People's Republic of China as a sophisticated dictatorship in which citizens are granted many freedoms, but freedom has its strictly defined limits, beyond which the Chinese Communist Party intervenes with whatever force the Party deems appropriate. The Party is always present and everyone is aware of it. It does not try to dictate to everyone exactly what they can do, on the contrary it controls very strictly what is not allowed. Ringen points to the long-term advantage of this approach over the simple use of brute force. However, he reminds us that the threat of punishment for crossing this indeterminate boundary of freedom is always present.

== Reception ==
The book received a contentious reception from book critics and analysts. It has been criticised for being unclear on what, exactly, the "perfect dictatorship" actually means, in addition to a lack of engagement with existing evidence on its key claims. At the same time, it has been praised as a powerful critique of the Chinese state, as well as a poignant analysis able to generate exntensive discussion about the Chinese state. Stein Ringen says: "The cold radicalism of this depiction of the Chinese regime will obviously generate criticism, disagreement, and debate. This may also be the reason why this book is essential reading."
