= Journal of European Social Policy =

- Discipline: Political Science
- Language: English
- Edited by: Janine Leschke (Copenhagen Business School), Emmanuele Pavolini (University of Macerata), Martin Seeleib-Kaiser (Eberhard Karls Universität Tübingen)

Publication details
- History: 1991-present
- Publisher: SAGE Publications
- Frequency: 5/year
- Impact factor: 3.063 (2020)

Standard abbreviations
- ISO 4: J. Eur. Soc. Policy

Indexing
- ISSN: 0958-9287 (print); 1461-7269 (web)
- LCCN: 97660658
- OCLC no.: 663026058

Links
- Journal homepage; Online access; Online archive

Journal of European Social Policy is a peer-reviewed academic journal published five times a year by SAGE Publications. Its articles are in the field of Political sciences, this journal was established in 1991, and on its content approaches a wide range of social policy issues including ageing, pensions and social security, poverty and social exclusion, education, training and labour market policies, family policies, health and social care services, gender, migration, privatisation and Europeanisation.

== Scope ==
The Journal of European Social policy publishes articles on all aspects of Social Policy. The journal seeks articles which deal with issues such as ageing, pensions and social security. The Journal of European Social Policy is a quarterly published journal which is edited by Janine Leschke (Copenhagen Business School), Emmanuele Pavolini (University of Macerata) and Martin Seeleib-Kaiser (Eberhard Karls Universität Tübingen).

== Abstracting and indexing ==
Journal of European Social Policy is abstracted and indexed in Scopus, and the Social Sciences Citation Index. According to the Journal Citation Reports, its 2020 impact factor is 3.063.
