= Social interventionism =

Intervention of a public or private organization in social affairs

Social interventionism is an action which involves the deliberate intervention of a public or private organization into social affairs for the purpose of changing them. In other words, it is a deliberate attempt to change society in some way, "an alteration of the social structure".

In the late 20th century, with the rise of the Washington Consensus, social interventionism fell out of favor in international political thought.

Academic research of social interventions occurs in many public policy schools around the world. Some universities also have dedicated research centres or clusters covering social intervention, for example the Department of Social Policy and Intervention at the University of Oxford.

== Hoffman framework ==
David Lloyd Hoffmann, Distinguished Professor of History at Ohio State University, with expertise in Russian and Soviet history, describes social interventionism as one of the two defining features of modernity and modern political systems (the second feature being mass politics).

According to Hoffmann, a general ethos of social intervention arose across Europe by the 19th century, in which both state officials and non-governmental professionals working for charitable institutions or private companies tried to reshape their societies in accordance with scientific or aesthetic norms.

This new ethos was based upon Enlightenment rationalism, with its belief that human society can and should be improved through the application of reason, as well as 17th century cameralism that pioneered the use of statistics and data in making government decisions. Social interventions could take many forms depending on the ideology of the people or institutions undertaking them, and both the left and right wings of European politics supported the broad idea of social interventionism, though they disagreed on how society should be improved and what "improvement" meant.

Therefore, social interventionism is not defined as a specific set of goals or policies, but rather as the "impulse to manage society through the application of bureaucratic procedures and categories", or the "rational design of social order commensurate with the scientific understanding of natural laws".

== See also ==
- Economic interventionism
