= Tony Crook (town planner) =

Anthony Derek Howell Crook, CBE, FAcSS, FRTPI, FRSA (22 December 1944 - November 2024), was a British academic and emeritus professor of town and regional planning at the University of Sheffield.

== Career ==
Anthony Derek Howell Crook graduated from the University of Bristol in 1965 with a geography degree, before completing a master of philosophy degree in town planning at University College London in 1967; he then spent two years as a research officer in the Greater London Council's Planning Department. Crook was appointed a lecturer in town and country planning at the University of Sheffield in 1968 and became a Chartered Town Planner in 1977. In 1989, the University of Sheffield awarded him with a doctor of philosophy degree for his thesis "Improving private rented sector: the impact of changes in ownership and of local authority policies." Crook became a professor of town and country planning at the University of Sheffield, where he was also head of the Department of Town Planning until 1999, when he became Pro-Vice-Chancellor (serving until 2008). In 2010, he retired and remained at Sheffield as an emeritus professor.

Crook is a former chair of the homelessness charity Shelter (retiring in 2013), deputy chair of Orbit Group (retired 2018), and from June to December 2017 served as deputy chair of the Construction Industry Council.

== Honours and awards ==
In 2001, Crook was elected a Fellow of the Royal Town Planning Institute (FRTPI) and in 2004 he was elected a Fellow of the Academy of Social Sciences. He was also a Fellow of the Royal Society of Arts. The University of Sheffield awarded him with an honorary doctor of letters (LittD) degree in 2013 and, in the 2014 New Year Honours, Crook was awarded a CBE "for services to housing and charitable governance".

== Selected publications ==
- Planning Gain: Providing Infrastructure and Affordable Housing (Oxford: Wiley-Blackwell, 2016). (Co-authored with John Henneberry and Christine Whitehead)
- Private Rental Housing: Comparative Perspectives (Cheltenham: Edward Elgar, 2014). (Co-authored with Peter Kemp)
- Housing Finance in Sheffield: The Impact and Incidence of Housing Subsidies. 1990
- Property dealers, local authority policy and the repair and improvement of unfurnished private rented housing. 1989. (Co-authored with C. B. Sharp)
- Private Landlords in England. 1996. (Co-authored with Peter Kemp)
- Transforming Private Landlords: Housing, Markets and Public Policy. 2002. (Co-authored with Peter Kemp)
- Planning Gain and Affordable Housing: Making It Count. 2002.
