= Mary Chamberlain =

British novelist and historian

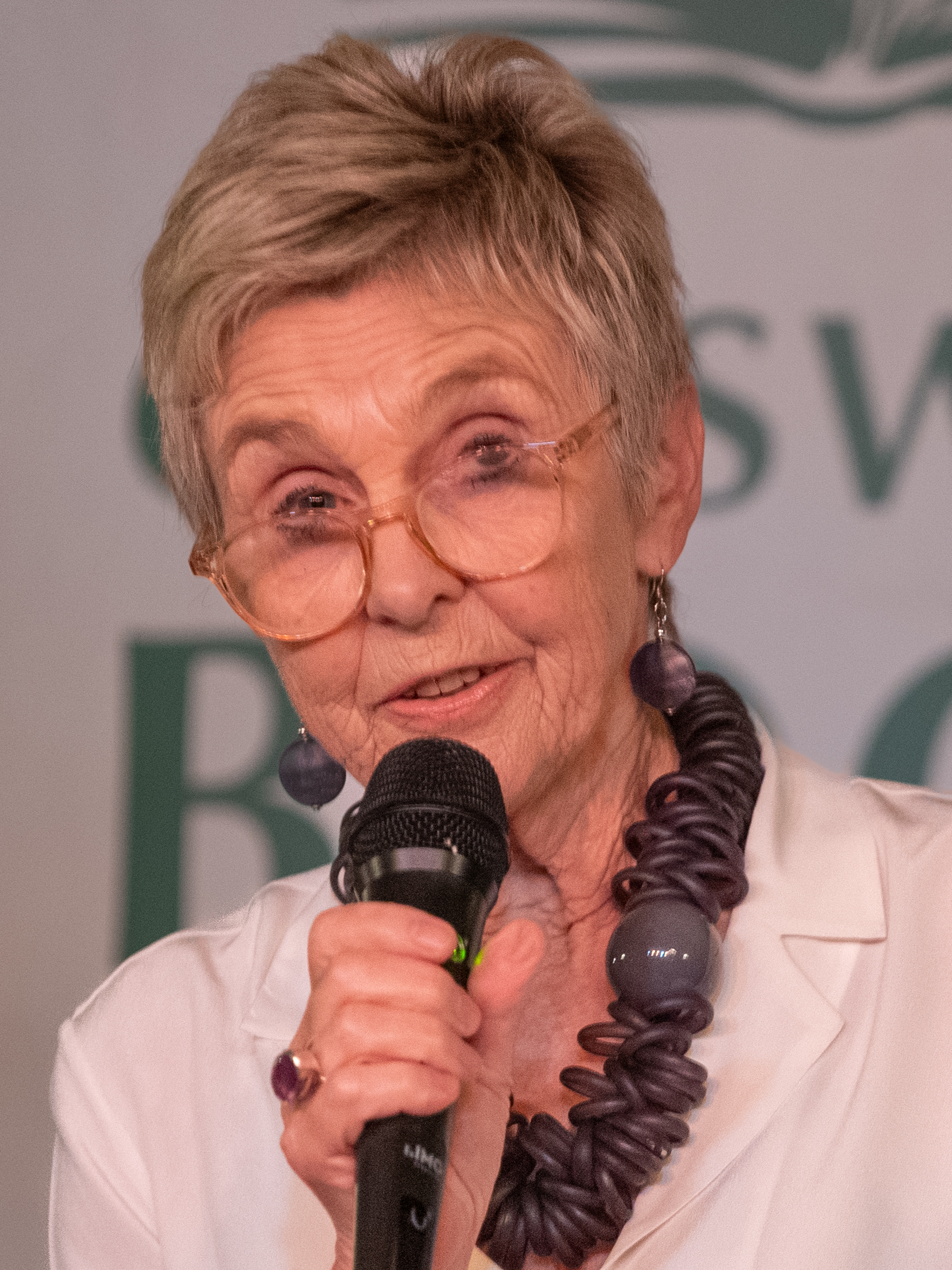
Chamberlain in 2023

Mary Chamberlain (born 3 September 1947) is a British novelist and historian. She has been largely collected by libraries worldwide.

== Early life ==
Chamberlain was born 3 September 1947 in South London, and holds degrees from the University of Edinburgh, The London School of Economics and Political Science, and Royal Holloway, University of London.

== Family life ==
She is married to the political scientist Stein Ringen. Chamberlain was previously married to Carey Harrison.

== Historical career ==
Chamberlain is emeritus Professor of History, at Oxford Brookes University. Her book Fenwomen. Portrait of Women in an English Village was the first book published by Virago Press in 1975, and pioneered the use of oral history in the study of women's history. It was also the inspiration for the Joint Stock production of Caryl Churchill’s award-winning play Fen (1983). Fenwomen has been published in four editions. The latest, by Virago Press, is a special 50th anniversary edition in their Virago Modern Classics series. It has a new introduction by Alexandra Harris. The 1975 edition of Fenwomen was followed by two further books with Virago Press on women’s history: Old Wives’ Tales: Their History, Remedies and Spells and Growing Up In Lambeth.

From 1987 to 1991, she lived in Barbados, and began working in Caribbean history. Using oral history, she published two pioneering studies of migration and families, Narratives of Exile and Return and Family Love in the Diaspora: Migration and the Anglo Caribbean Experience, and a highly acclaimed study of decolonization, Empire and Nation-building in the Caribbean: Barbados 1937–1966.

Chamberlain is widely considered one of the founders of oral history, was the reviews editor of the Oral History Journal from 1977 to 1987 and co-founder of the London History Workshop Centre. She is the author of many articles on women's history, oral history and Caribbean history, has edited a number of books, and was a founding editor or the series Memory and Narrative. She has served on editorial, advisory and government committees, and held visiting professorships at the University of the West Indies (1995, 2004), and New York University (2004). She has been the recipient of a number of research awards and is an adviser to the National Life Story Collection at the British Library and the Raphael Samuel History Centre.

== Fiction career ==
Her UK debut novel The Dressmaker of Dachau was published in 2015, and sold to 19 countries. She credits the inspiration for the story to two of her aunts, of whom one left the family and ran away, and the other was imprisoned by the Nazi regime during the Second World War.

== Activism ==
Chamberlain was one of the London Recruits, a group of young people recruited by the African National Congress (ANC) in the 1960s and 1970s to smuggle ANC and SACP literature into South Africa after the ANC had been decimated by the Rivonia trials of 1963/4.

== Awards ==
Chamberlain was awarded an honorary Doctorate (D.Litt) by the University of East Anglia in 2021.

== Bibliography ==
- The Lie (2023)
- The Forgotten (2021)
- The Hidden (2019)
- The Dressmaker of Dachau (2015)
- The Mighty Jester (2014)
- Empire and Nation-building in the Caribbean: Barbados 1937 – 1966 (2010)
- Memories of Mass Repression (editor, with Nanci Adler, Selma Leydesdorff, Leyla Neyzi, 2009)
- Family Love in the Diaspora: Migration and the Anglo Caribbean Experience (2006)
- Caribbean Families in Britain and the Transatlantic World (editor, with Harry Goulbourne, 2001)
- Caribbean Migration: Globalised Identities (editor, 1998)
- Narrative and Genre (editor with Paul Thompson, 1998, 2004)
- Narratives of Exile and Return (1997, 2004)
- Growing Up In Lambeth (1989)
- Writing Lives (editor, 1988)
- Old Wives’ Tales: Their Histories, Charms, Spells (1981, 2006)
- Fenwomen: A Portrait of Women in an English Village (1975, 1983, 2011, 2025)
