= Christine Whitehead =

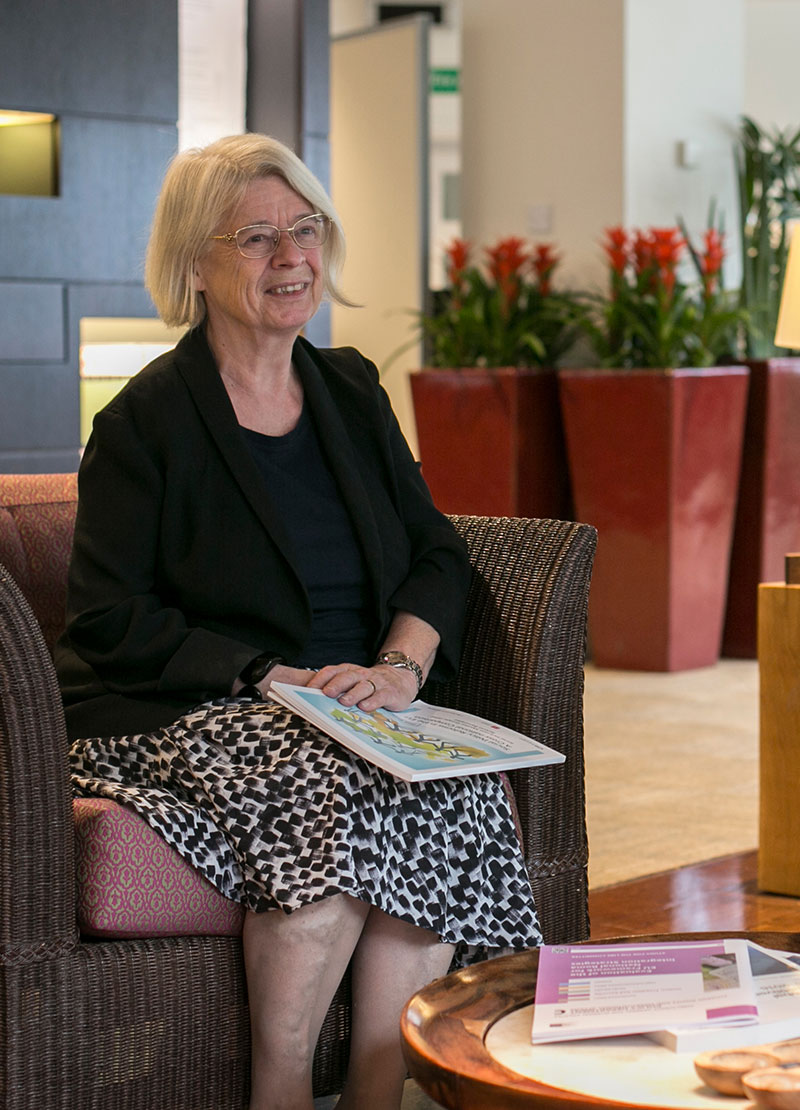
Christine Whitehead

Christine Whitehead is a British Academic and emeritus professor of housing economics at the London School of Economics and Political Science. She is also the Deputy Directory of LSE London, an urban research group at London School of Economics and Political Science

== Biography ==
Christine is a well-known economist specialised in housing economics, finance and policy. She conducted research on the housing market, in particular on land-use planning in UK and Europe, housing finance and supply.

After graduating in economics in 1963, she earned a PhD in 1970 at London School of Economics and Political Science, with a thesis on the economics of housing in the UK. She then worked with several international agencies, the Government and the Parliament of the United Kingdom. In particular, from 1990 to 2010 she was the Director of the Cambridge Center for Housing and Planning Research, a policy-oriented research centre at the University of Cambridge.

In 1991 she was awarded the OBE for services to housing. In 2001 she was appointed fellow of the Society of Property Researchers.

In 2013, she was adviser to the House of Commons Work and Pensions Committee on their inquiry into welfare support for housing costs. In 2016, she was appointed specialist adviser to the House of Lords Economic Affairs Committee on the Building More Homes' report sessions. She also regularly advised the Housing, Communities and Local Government Committee, conducting investigations on private and social housing supply, land-value capture and latterly on the Voluntary Right to Buy report.

== Research and Selected Publications ==
Christine Whitehead's recent research focused on the relationship between planning and housing; the roles of private and social renting in British and European housing systems; accelerating housing development in London; migration and the housing market; evaluation of government policies on home ownership and housing supply.

She also conducted research working as a consultant on projects related to the cost of homelessness services in London and rent control from an international perspective

Her latest books are Milestones in Housing Finance in Europe. (with Jens Lunde) and Planning Gain: Providing Infrastructure and Affordable Housing (with Tony Crook and John Henneberry).
