= David Donnison =

British academic and social scientist (1926–2018)

David Vernon Donnison (19 January 1926 – 28 April 2018) was a British academic and social scientist, who was Professor of Social Administration at the London School of Economics from 1961 to 1969, and Professor of Town and Regional Planning (1980–91) and Honorary Research Fellow (from 1991) at the University of Glasgow.

== Career ==
=== Early life and education ===
David Vernon Donnison was born on 19 January 1926 at Yenangyaung in colonial Burma; his father, Frank Siegfried Vernon Donnison, CBE, was a colonial administrator then posted at the town with the Indian Civil Service. His mother was Ruth Seruya, nee Singer, MBE, JP, granddaughter of Simeon Singer. David wrote about his early life in colonial Burma in his 2005 book The Last Guardians. He was educated at boarding schools from the age of 8, finally at Marlborough College from 1940 to 1943. He joined the Royal Navy as an officer and served in the North Atlantic and the Pacific oceans during the Second World War, before going up to Magdalen College, Oxford, in 1947. He graduated three years later with a first-class degree in philosophy, politics and economics.

=== Academia ===
Donnison was appointed to a lectureship at the University of Manchester in 1950 where he worked under W. J. M. Mackenzie. He remained there until 1953, when he took up a lectureship at the University of Toronto. Returning to England two years later, he joined the London School of Economics (LSE) as a reader (and thus Richard Titmuss's deputy as chair of social administration); in 1961, he succeeded Titmuss to the chair and became the LSE's second Professor of Social Administration. As The Scotsman summarised, Donnison was thus among a "distinguished group of social administration experts at LSE in the 1950s and 1960s – notably Titmuss, Brian Abel-Smith, Peter Townsend, Roy Parker, John Grieve and Tony Lynes"; with a "profound commitment to eradicating poverty of income and opportunity, [they] had a deep and lasting influence on the development and growth of Britain's welfare state." Here, he focused on housing and planning; he received a major grant from the Joseph Rowntree Foundation to study the social effects of the Rent Act 1957. He wrote Housing since the Rent Act, which was published in 1961, and subsequently served on Milner Holland's Royal Commission on Housing in Greater London from 1965 and the government's Central Housing Advisory Committee. In 1967, he wrote The Government of Housing, a best-selling Pelican study which resulted from his work as a consultant to the UN Economic Commission for Europe. He also studied education and served on the Plowden Committee on Primary Education in 1967, developing the concept of Educational Priority Areas with Michael Young. From 1968 to 1970, he also chaired the Public Schools Commission, which reported on the financial state of public schools and then went on to investigate direct-grant grammar schools.

In 1969, he left his chair at LSE and worked (until 1976) as director of a thinktank, the Centre for Environmental Studies. In the meantime, he joined the Supplementary Benefits Commission as deputy chairman in 1973 and two years later took over as chairman, serving until 1980. The SBC was abolished by the Thatcher administration, but Donnison later recalled that its work entailed him meeting some of the poorest people in the country; for him, it was "radicalising" experience and he returned to studying poverty. He was appointed Professor of Town and Regional Planning at the University of Glasgow in 1980. The regeneration of the city of Glasgow was underway in the 1980s and Donnison took a keen interest in it; he led the mid-term review of the GEAR project, and, with Alan Middleton, edited Regenerating the Inner City: Glasgow’s Experience in 1987. At the university, he also became the inaugural co-director of the Scottish Housing Research Group in 1982.

By the time he retired in 1991 (he was thereafter an emeritus professor and honorary research fellow at Glasgow), Donnison had accumulated four honorary doctorates, from the universities of Bradford (1973), Hull (1980), and Leeds and Southampton (both 1981). He received the Lifetime Achievement Award from the Social Policy Association in 2008. According to his obituary in The Guardian, Donnison was "one of a group of outstanding academics who played an important part in shaping social policy during the 1960s and 70s, and, in his case, well beyond. He remained engaged in public debate until the end of his life." In the 1960s, he had controversially advocated that benefits should not be awarded at the discretion of civil servants, and that claimants should have statutory rights. He remained an advocate of marginalised groups for the rest of his life.

=== Later life ===
In retirement, Donnison continued to write, authoring Policies for a Just Society (1997) and Speaking to Power: Advocacy for Health and Social Care (2009); but he was also a keen windsurfer, painter, draughtsman and poet, and he took up playing in a ceilidh band. He was well-settled in Scotland, and lived in Glasgow for the rest of his life, although he spent long periods of time on Easdale island. He died on 28 April 2018.

== Personal life ==
Donnison married Jean Kidger (died 2017), whom he had met at Oxford, in 1951. They separated in 1979 and he married the writer and activist Kay Carmichael (died 2009) in 1987. By his first wife, Donnison had two daughters (Rachel and Polly), two sons (Christopher and Harry) and a foster son (John), and with his second wife a step-daughter (Sheena).
