= Social Policy & Society =

- Discipline: Social Policy, Sociology
- Language: English
- Edited by: Liam Foster and Majella Kilkey

Publication details
- History: 2002-present
- Publisher: Cambridge University Press (United Kingdom)
- Frequency: Quarterly
- Impact factor: 2.119 (2020)

Standard abbreviations
- ISO 4: Soc. Policy Soc.

Indexing
- ISSN: 1474-7464 (print); 1475-3073 (web)

Links
- Journal homepage; Online access; Online archive

Social Policy & Society is a quarterly peer-reviewed academic journal in the fields of Social Policy and Sociology. It was founded in 2002 and is published by Cambridge University Press. Social Policy & Society is a journal of the UK Social Policy Association.

== Abstracting and indexing ==
The journal is abstracted and indexed in (inter alia):

- Scopus
- Social Sciences Citation Index.
- International Political Science Abstracts
- Arts & Humanities Citation Index
- Public Administration Abstracts
- PAIS International
- Sociological Abstracts
- Psychological Abstracts
- Sociology of Education Abstracts
- Elsevier Science Bibliographic Database
