= Leonard Barnes =

Leonard John Barnes MC and Bar (1895–1977) was a British anti-colonialist writer, journalist and educationalist.

== Life ==
Leonard Barnes was born in London on 21 July 1895. Educated at St Paul's School, he was awarded the Military Cross and Bar while serving with the King's Royal Rifle Corps during World War I. He then attended University College, Oxford, where he studied Greats. After four years working for the Colonial Office, where his father had worked, he travelled to South Africa to work as a farmer and journalist. He was a leader-writer on the Cape Times and then assistant editor of the Johannesburg Star.

In 1932 Barnes returned to England as a freelance journalist, adult educator and political activist. Continuing to draw on his African experience, he wrote several books on colonial and development issues: The New Boer War (1932), Zulu Paraclete (1935), The Duty of Empire (1935) and Empire or Democracy (1939). In the 1935 General Election he stood unsuccessfully as a Labour candidate for Derby.

From 1936 to 1945 he was a lecturer in education at the University of Liverpool, where for several years he was also Warden of the Men's Hall of Residence there. Resigning in 1945, he concentrated on writing, producing two notable reports for the King George's Jubilee Trust, on the nature and objectives of youth work: Youth Service in an English County (1945) and The Outlook for Youth Work (1948). He also visited Malaya, serving on the 1947-8 Carr-Saunders Commission which established the University of Malaya. He visited Malaya again in 1950, chairing a commission on the education of the Malay community.

In 1947 Barnes was appointed head of the Delegacy of Social Training at Oxford University. He raised the academic level at Barnett House, eventually turning it into a post-graduate institution. He encouraged the place of psychology and sociology in the curriculum. He also introduced dedicated vocational courses for personnel management, the child care and probation services, and social research.

Barnes retired in 1962, and died on 10 March 1977, aged 81.
