= Stein Ringen =

Norwegian sociologist, political scientist and professor

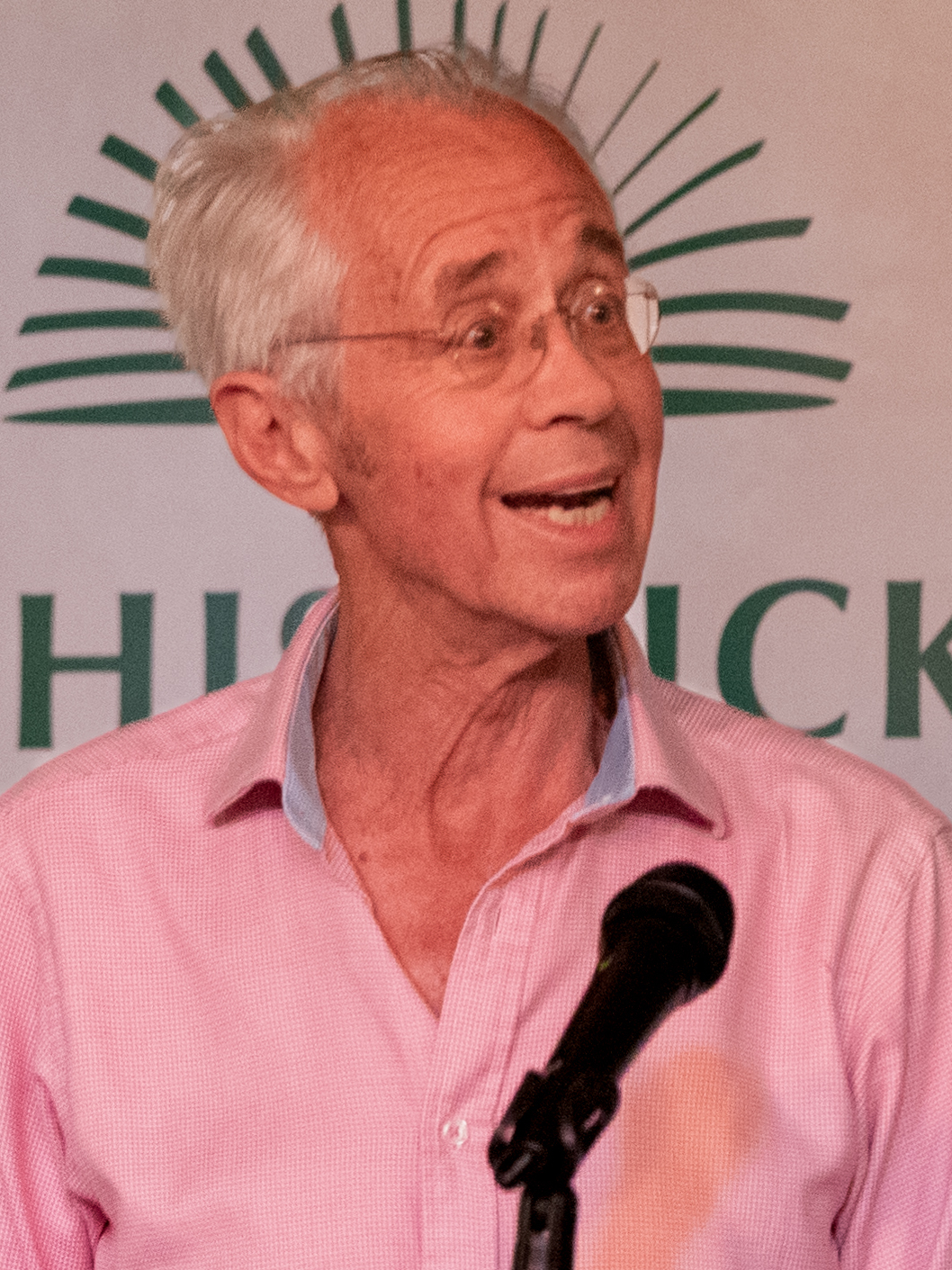
Ringen in 2023

Stein Ringen (born July 5, 1945) is a Norwegian sociologist and political scientist. He is Professor of Sociology and Social Policy at the Department of Social Policy and Intervention, University of Oxford, and a Fellow of Green Templeton College, Oxford (formerly Green College, Oxford). He is married to the novelist and historian Mary Chamberlain.

== Early life and education ==
Ringen holds a magister degree in political science (a 7-year degree including 3 years of research) from the University of Oslo (1972) and a Dr. philos. degree from the University of Oslo (1987).

== Career ==
He has been a visiting professor at Université de Paris I - Panthéon Sorbonne (1995, 1996), École Normale Supérieure de Cachan (1996-1997), Masaryk University (2003), Charles University (2003), University of the West Indies (2004, 2006) and Wissenschaftszentrum Berlin für Sozialforschung (2006).

== Books ==
- 2023: The Story of Scandinavia: From the Vikings to Social Democracy
- 2016: The Perfect Dictatorship: China in the 21st Century
- 2013: Nation of Devils: Democratic Leadership and the Problem of Obedience, Yale Univ. Press
- 2009: The Economic Consequences of Mr Brown
- 2007: What Democracy Is For
- 2006: The Possibility of Politics (new edition)
- 2005: Citizens, Families, and Reform (new edition)
- 2004: Norges nye befolkning
- 2000: Veien til det gode liv'
- 1999: Ordet som er (co-author)
- 1998: The Family in Question
- 1997: Reformdemokratiet
