= Kay Carmichael =

Scottish politician and activist

Catherine MacIntosh Carmichael
- Born: 22 November 1925; Shettleston, Glasgow, Scotland
- Died: 26 December 2009 (aged 84)
- Education: University of Edinburgh; University of Glasgow
- Political party: Independent Labour

Catherine MacIntoch "Kay" Carmichael (22 November 1925 – 26 December 2009) (née Rankin) was an influential figure in Scottish politics and an activist against nuclear submarines in Scotland.

== Life ==
Carmichael was born at Shettleston, Glasgow on 22 November 1925. She studied at the University of Edinburgh and went on to hold the post of Senior Lecturer at the University of Glasgow. At the age of 20 she joined the Independent Labour Party in Scotland. Her activism included "guerrilla raids" into Faslane Naval Base to plant flowers for which she was sentenced to two weeks in prison. Whilst a member of the UK Government’s Supplementary Benefits Commission in the late 1970s she chose to live for a short while on benefits in the Lilybank area of Glasgow. In 1977, BBC Scotland made a documentary based on her experiences. ‘Lilybank:The Fourth World’ was widely resented by residents, decried as ‘poverty porn’ by academics while being praised for its ‘realism’ by others.

She was married to Neil Carmichael, Baron Carmichael of Kelvingrove, a Scottish MP who became a life peer and Member of the House of Lords in 1983: they divorced in 1987. Together they had one daughter. She then married social policy expert David Donnison.

== Books ==
- It Takes a Lifetime to Become Yourself: A Collection of Writings by Kay Carmichael, edited by David Donnison (Scotland Street Press, 2017) ISBN 978-1-910895-17-7
