= Peter Kemp (social scientist) =

Peter Anthony Kemp, FAcSS (born 25 December 1955) is a social scientist.

== Career ==
Kemp was born on 25 December 1955. He graduated from the University of Southampton with a geography degree in 1977 and two years later completed a Master of Philosophy degree at the University of Glasgow. In 1984, the University of Sussex awarded him a doctorate for his thesis "The transformation of the urban housing market in Britain c. 1885–1939". Kemp returned to Glasgow in 1985 as a research fellow, before lecturing at the University of Salford from 1987 to 1990, when he was appointed the first Joseph Rowntree Professor of Housing Policy at the University of York. He returned to Glasgow again in 1996, as a professor of housing and social policy, and then back to York to take up a professorship of social policy in 2002. In 2006, he was appointed Barnett Professor of Social Policy at the University of Oxford and held that post until 2013, although he remained a professor of public policy at the University. Since 2011, he has also been Vice-Dean at Oxford's Blavatnik School of Government.

Kemp's research focuses on housing policy especially related to housing allowances, the private rental sector, welfare and homelessness.

=== Honours and awards ===
In 2011, Kemp was elected a Fellow of the Academy of Social Sciences (FAcSS).

== Selected publications ==
- (Co-editor with Tony Crook) Private Rental Housing: Comparative Perspectives (Cheltenham: Edward Elgar, 2014).
- (Co-authored with Tony Crook) Transforming Private Landlords: Housing, Markets and Public Policy (Oxford: Blackwell-Wiley, 2011).
- (Editor), Housing Allowances in Comparative Perspective (Bristol: Policy Press, 2007).
- (Co-editor with Caroline Glendinning), Cash and Care: Policy Challenges in the Welfare State (Bristol: Policy Press, 2006).
- (Co-editor with Bernhard Bakker-Tauritz and Annika Sunden) Sick Societies? Trends in Disability Benefits in Post-industrial Welfare States (Geneva: International Social Security Association, 2006).
- Private Renting in Transition (Coventry: CIH Publications, 2004).
- (Co-authored with David Clapham and Susan J. Smith), Housing and Social Policy (London: Macmillan, 1990).
- (Editor) The Private Provision of Rented Housing (Aldershot: Avebury, 1988).
