= Decline and abolition of the poor law system =

Change in English welfare system

The Decline and abolition of the poor law system in England and Wales can be traced to around 1870 when the proportion of the population on poor relief began to fall rapidly; this trend continued until the outbreak of the First World War in 1914.

The demise of the poor law system can largely be attributed to the availability of alternative sources of assistance, including membership of friendly societies and trade unions. Local government began to offer work relief outside of the poor law system, and the interventionism of the Liberal government in their Liberal reforms led to the abolition of the poor law.

In 1870, the clergyman and social reformer John Young Stratton argued that the Poor Law discouraged provident habits among agricultural labourers, advocating well-managed friendly societies and a system of insurance under government supervision as means of reducing reliance on poor relief.

Use of the poor law system increased during the interwar years due to high levels of unemployment. The Local Government Act 1929 abolished poor law unions and transferred the administration of poor relief to local government, leaving the poor law system largely redundant. In 1934 the Unemployment Assistance Board gained responsibility for the unemployed, and from 1945-1948 the modern welfare state was introduced, including the National Health Service. The National Assistance Act 1948 (11 & 12 Geo. 6. c. 29) repealed all poor law legislation.
