= Martin Seeleib-Kaiser =

Social scientist and academic

- Born: 13 February 1964
- Education: LMU Munich
- Scientific career
- Fields: social policy
- Workplaces: Eberhard Karls Universität Tübingen; St Cross College, Oxford; Department of Social Policy and Intervention, Oxford
- Thesis: (1992)
- Doctoral advisor: Dieter Grosser and Hartmut Keil
- Other academic advisors: Stephan Leibfried
- Doctoral students: Cecilia Bruzelius (Tübingen), Timo Fleckenstein (LSE), Marek Naczyk (Oxford), Manuel Souto Otero (Bristol)
- Website: https://uni-tuebingen.de/de/111106

Martin Seeleib-Kaiser (born 13 February 1964) is a European social scientist. He studied Political Science, American Studies and Public Law at LMU Munich, from where he also received his PhD in political science. Since 2017, he has been Professor of Comparative Public Policy at the Institute of Political Science of the Eberhard Karls Universität Tübingen, in Tübingen, Germany. He was previously a Fellow of St Cross College, Oxford, and Barnett Professor of Comparative Social Policy and Politics at the Department of Social Policy and Intervention of the University of Oxford. He had earlier taught at the University of Bremen (Germany), and at Duke University in Durham, North Carolina, in the United States.

== Publications ==
- Amerikanische Sozialpolitik - Politische Diskussion und Entscheidungen der Reagan-Ära. Opladen: Leske & Budrich 1993.
- Globalisierung und Sozialpolitik. Ein Vergleich der Diskurse und Wohlfahrtssysteme in Deutschland, Japan und den USA. Frankfurt/M.; New York: Campus 2001.
- Sozial- und Wirtschaftspolitik unter Rot-Grün. Wiesbaden: Westdeutscher Verlag 2003, co-editor
- The Dual Transformation of the German Welfare State. Basingstoke/New York: Palgrave/Macmillan 2004, co-author.
- Party Politics and Social Welfare. Cheltenham: Edward Elgar 2008, co-author.
- Welfare State Transformations. Comparative Perspectives. Basingstoke/New York: Palgrave/Macmillan 2008, editor.
- The Age of Dualization. New York/Oxford: Oxford University Press 2012, co-editor.
- European Citizenship and Social Rights. Cheltenham: Edward Elgar 2018, co-editor.
- Youth Labor in Transition. New York/Oxford: Oxford University Press 2019, co-editor.
- European Social Policy and the COVID-19 Pandemic. New York/Oxford: Oxford University Press 2023, co-editor.
- Multilevel Social Citizenship: Free Movement and Minimum Social Protection. New York/Oxford: Oxford University Press 2026, co-author.
