= Bob Deacon =

Bob Deacon (died October 1 2017) was a prominent British social policy academic and policy advisor. He was credited by Kaasch and Stubbs with responsibility for the introduction of the term global social policy.

== Career ==
Deacon was Emeritus Professor of International Social Policy at the University of Sheffield. He was the founding editor of the journal Global Social Policy: An international journal of social development and public policy and an elected fellow of the Academy of Social Sciences.

He has been an advisor or consultant on international social policy to the ILO, WHO, UNESCO, UNDP, UNDESA, EC, Council of Europe, and World Bank. From 2007 he was an Associate Research Fellow at the United Nations University (UNU-CRIS) in Bruges.

== Selected publications ==
- Deacon, Bob. (1997) Global social policy: International organizations and the future of welfare. Sage. ISBN 9781446265000
- Deacon, B. (2007). Global social policy and governance. Sage. ISBN 9781412907620
