= Ruth Lister, Baroness Lister of Burtersett =

Professor of Social Policy (born 1949)

The Right Honourable The Baroness Lister of Burtersett CBE FBA FAcSS
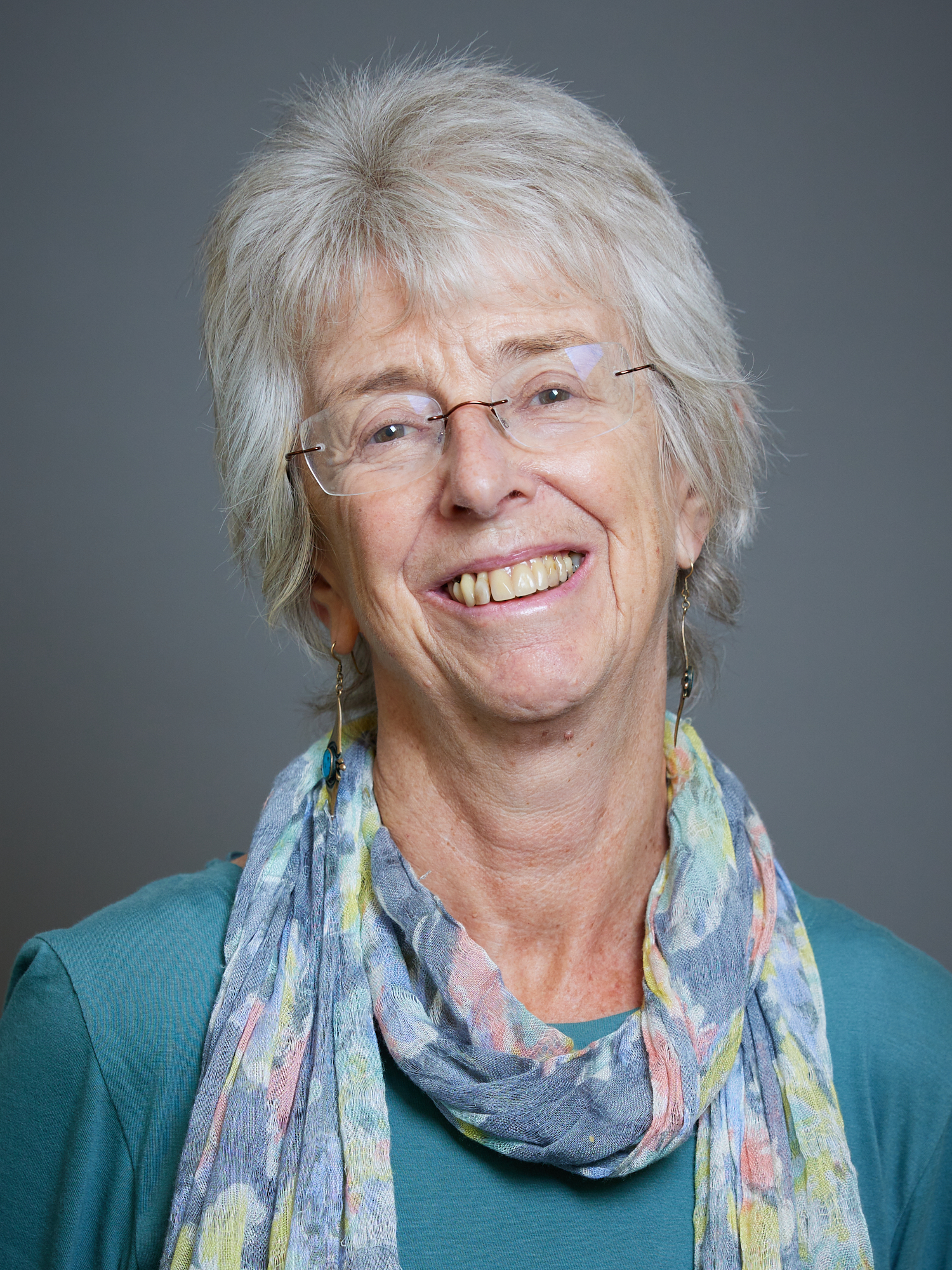
- Official portrait, 2022

Member of the House of Lords
- Lord Temporal
- Life peerage 31 January 2011

Personal details
- Born: 3 May 1949 (age 77)
- Party: Labour
- Education: University of Essex; University of Sussex

Margot Ruth Aline Lister, Baroness Lister of Burtersett, (born 3 May 1949) is currently Professor of Social Policy at Loughborough University. She has written or contributed to a number of books, pamphlets and articles on poverty, social security and women's citizenship.

== Biography ==
She was born to Dr Werner Bernard and Daphne (née Carter) Lister. She attended a private school and then the University of Essex, from which she graduated with a BA degree in sociology, and continued to an MA degree in multi-racial studies from the University of Sussex. She has also received honorary doctorates from the Caledonian University. After completing her MA degree, she worked for the Child Poverty Action Group.

She was appointed Commander of the Order of the British Empire (CBE) in the 1999 Birthday Honours and, in 2009, became a Fellow of the British Academy. She was appointed to the House of Lords as a life peer on 31 January 2011 as Baroness Lister of Burtersett, in the County of North Yorkshire (Burtersett being the village her mother originated from). She sits as a member of the Labour Party.

== Employment history ==
Lister began her career at the Child Poverty Action Group as a Legal Research Officer from 1971 to 1975. She served as Assistant Director between 1975 and 1977, Deputy Director from 1977 to 1979, and Director from 1979 to 1987.

Lister was appointed Professor of Applied Social Studies at the University of Bradford, serving from 1987 to 1993. In 1994, she became Professor of Social Policy at Loughborough University. She also held the position of Donald Dewar Visiting Professor of Social Justice at the University of Glasgow from 2005 to 2006.

From 1991 to 1993, she served as Vice-Chair of the National Council for Voluntary Organisations (NCVO). She was a member of the Opsahl Commission between 1992 and 1993, the Commission for Social Justice from 1992 to 1994, the Commission on Poverty, Participation and Power from 1999 to 2000, the Fabian Commission on Life Chances and Child Poverty between 2004 and 2006, and the National Equality Panel from 2008 to 2010.

In 1989, Lister delivered the Eleanor Rathbone Memorial Lecture at the University of Leeds. She was elected a Founding Academician of the Academy of Social Sciences in 1999.

== Publications ==
- Supplementary Benefit Rights, 1974
- Welfare Benefits, 1981
- The Exclusive Society, 1990
- Women's Economic Dependency and Social Security, 1992
- Citizenship: feminist perspectives, 1997, 2nd edition 2003
- Poverty, 2004, 2nd edition 2020 ISBN 978-0745645971
- Gendering Citizenship in Western Europe, 2007
- 'Co-editor of Why Money Matters, 2008
- Understanding Theories and Concepts in Social Policy, 2010
