= Social policy =

Action of institutional agencies that aim to improve society

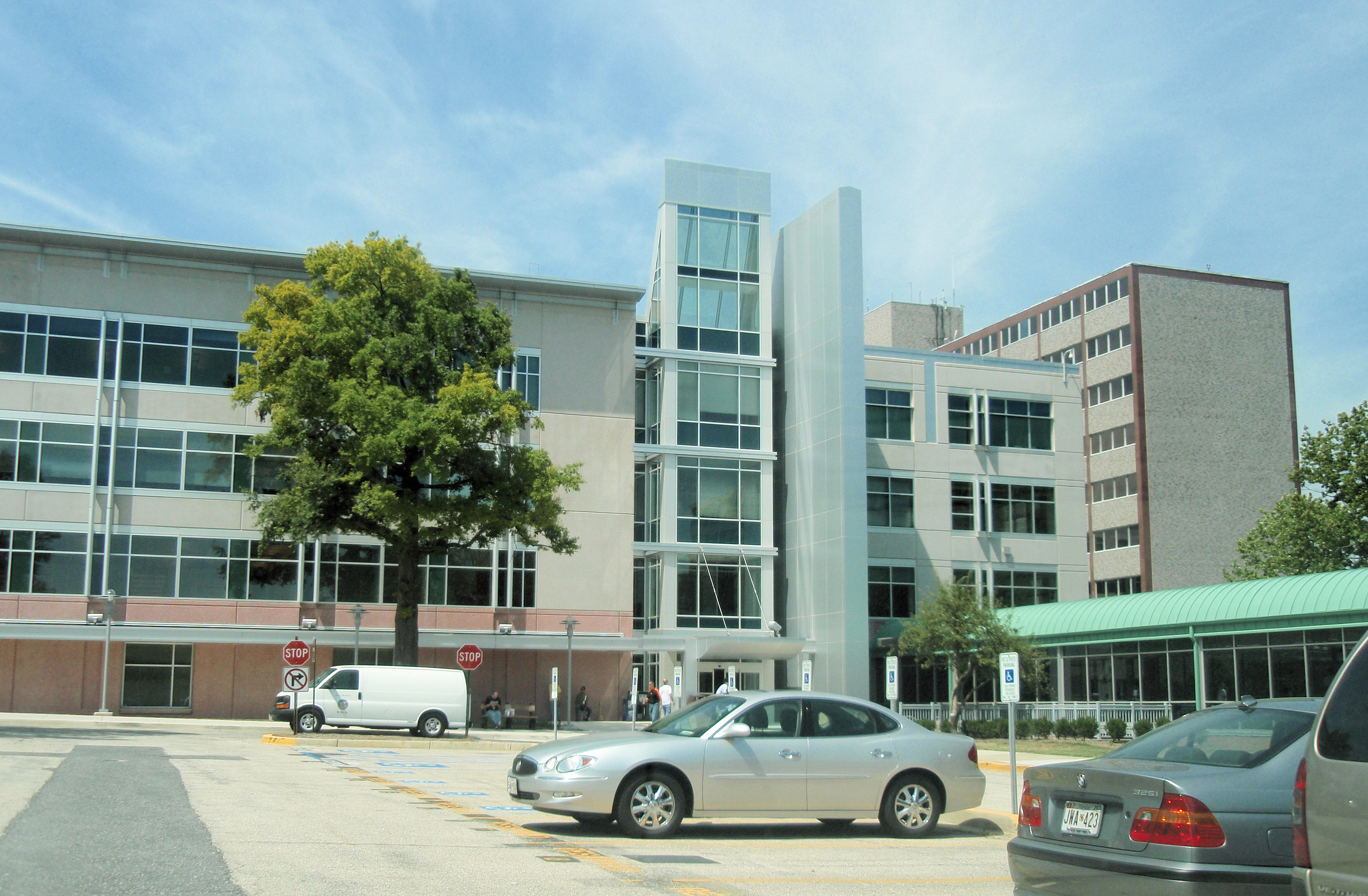
Headquarters of the Social Security Administration in Woodlawn, Maryland

Social policy is a plan or action of government or institutional agencies that aims to improve or reform society. Some professionals and universities consider social policy a subset of public policy, while other practitioners characterize social policy and public policy to be two separate, competing approaches for the same public interest (similar to MD and DO in healthcare), with social policy deemed more holistic than public policy. Whichever of these persuasions a university adheres to, social policy begins with the study of the welfare state and social services. It consists of guidelines, principles, legislation, and associated activities that affect the living conditions conducive to human welfare, such as a person's quality of life. Social policy might also be described as actions that affect the well-being of members of a society by shaping the distribution of goods and resources and access to them. Social policy often seeks to alleviate precarity and wicked problems.

== History ==
Allegory or The Triumph of Justice, an 1858 painting by Hans von Aachen

Social policy was first conceived as an academic subject in the 1940s by Richard Titmuss within the field of social administration in Britain. Titmuss's essay on the "Social Division of Welfare" (1955) laid the groundwork for social policy to absorb social administration gradually. Titmuss was an essayist whose work concerned the failure of the market, the inadequacy of selective social services, and the superiority of collectivism and universal approaches. Titmuss's critics include Frank Kemp Salter whose 2004 edited-book addresses and refines Titmuss's position.

=== Ancient world ===
Some of the earliest examples of direct intervention by government in human welfare date back to Ancient Rome's Cura Annonae (grain dole) founded in 123 BC, and Umar ibn al-Khattāb's rule as the second caliph of Islam in the 6th century: he used zakat collections and also other governmental resources to establish pensions, income support, child benefits, and various stipends for people of the non-Muslim community.

=== English and Western European advents ===
The enactment of English Poor Laws helped curb poverty and recidivism. These laws influenced the justices of Berkshire to implement the Speenhamland system, which was the first social program in the modern sense of that word. The Speenhamland Plan was so generous, usually by supplying peasants with bread, that it led to widespread pauperization of men who remained outside the labor market. Thus, while it helped provide food assistance, it would need to be reformed to prevent men from staying paupers.

Later, surveys of poverty exposing the brutal conditions in the urban slum conurbations of Victorian Britain put pressure on changes such as the decline and abolition of the poor law system and Liberal welfare reforms. In the modern West, proponents of scientific social planning, such as the sociologist Auguste Comte, and social researchers, such as Charles Booth, contributed to the emergence of social policymaking in the first industrialised countries following the Industrial Revolution.

=== Rise of social insurance ===
Initiatives to create social insurance revolutionized social policy. The Bismarckian welfare state in 19th century Germany, which were introduced under the State Socialism (Germany); Social Security policies in the United States introduced under the rubric of the New Deal between 1933 and 1935; and both the Beveridge Report and the National Health Service Act 1946 in Britain redefined the social role of the Great Powers.

Thus, two major models of social insurance emerged in practice: the Bismarckian welfare model from Germany and the Beveridgean welfare model from Britain. The Beveridge Model (like the UK's NHS) features government-funded, government-run healthcare, free at the point of service, financed by taxes, with public hospitals and staff. In contrast, the Bismarck Model (Germany, France, Japan) uses nonprofit "sickness funds" funded by employer- and employee-paid payroll deductions, covering private providers and ensuring universal care, with a mix of public/private delivery and often lower wait times due to competition. The key difference is between Beveridge's tax-funded, public-provider system and Bismarck's mandatory, social-insurance-funded system with private providers.

Furthermore, the post-WWII economic boom spurred many of the previously war-ravaged states to incorporate elements of social democracy into their decision-making, leading to more generous social expenditures nationally. Many social democratic measures were championed by the labor movement.

=== 21st century ===
Social policy in the 21st century is complex, and in each state it is subject to local and national governments, as well as supranational political influence. For example, membership of the European Union is conditional on member states' adherence to the Social Chapter of European Union law and other international laws. A global influence in the retrenchment and decline of generous government support has been the introduction of workfare (enacting work requirements to receive assistance). Despite being a socialist alliance, the Red-Green coalition in Germany, a partnership between the Social Democrats (red) and the Greens (ecologists), ushered in neoliberal reforms to the German social security program.

== Academic approaches ==
=== University programs ===
The newly minted academic field of social policy is configured in four primary ways across numerous universities: as a unique discipline, as a specialization within public policy, as a joint program, or as an interdisciplinary field.

==== Stand-alone social policy programs ====
While some scholars describe social policy as an interdisciplinary field of practice, scholars such as Fiona Williams and Pete Alcock believe it is an academic discipline unto itself. Formulating social policy as a discipline unto itself (rather than interdisciplinary), universities offering a stand-alone social policy degree include the University of Birmingham, University of York, Oxford University, and the University of Pennsylvania School of Social Policy and Practice.

==== As specialization to public policy programs ====
Universities offering a social policy specialization as part of a public policy degree program include McGill University, Balsillie School of International Affairs, Harris School of Public Policy, and the Hertie School of Governance. In the Global South, social policy is offered alongside public policy degree programmes, as at the Institute of Public Policy, National Law School of India University, Bangalore, and is combined with development policy. The Malcolm Wiener Center for Social Policy at Harvard University describes social policy as "public policy and practice in the areas of health care, human services, criminal justice, social inequality, education, and labor".

==== As joint degree programs ====
Universities offering a joint degree in social policy along with a related degree in social work or public health include the George Warren Brown School of Social Work at Washington University in St. Louis.

==== As interdisciplinary concept ====
The Department of Social Policy at the London School of Economics defines social policy as "an interdisciplinary and applied subject concerned with the analysis of societies' responses to social need", which seeks to foster in its students a capacity to understand theory and evidence drawn from a wide range of social science disciplines, including economics, sociology, psychology, geography, history, law, philosophy and political science.

=== Societies ===
- Social Policy Association (SPA), professional organization
- International Social Security Association (ISSA)
- National Academy of Social Insurance (NASI), a US organization

=== Journals ===
- Critical Social Policy
- Global Social Policy
- International Journal of Social Welfare
- Journal of Disability Policy Studies
- Journal of European Social Policy
- Journal of International & Comparative Social Policy
- Journal of Social Policy
- Social Choice and Welfare
- Social Policy & Society

== Major subsets ==
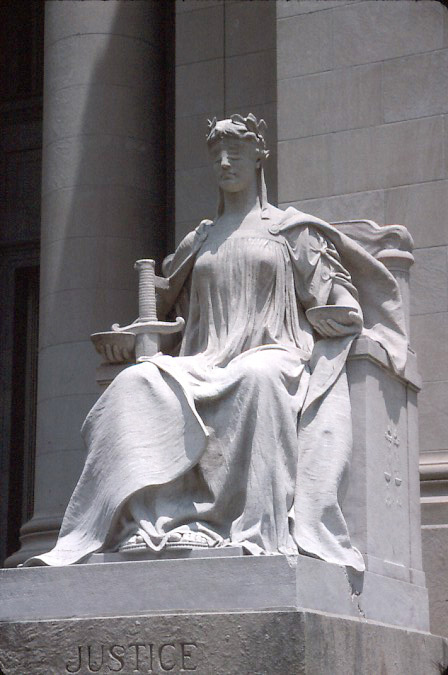
Statue of Lady Justice depicting justice as equipped with three symbols: a sword symbolizing the court's coercive power, a human scale weighing competing claims in each hand, and a blindfold indicating impartiality

According to the LSE, social policy aims to improve human welfare and quality of life by meeting the principal human needs of: Education, Health, Housing, and Economic security. Therefore, with its emphasis on preventing precarity, social policy is usually seen as being separate and distinct from fiscal policy, environmental policy, foreign policy, and military/war policy. As a result, social policy is also referred to as domestic policy or welfare policy.

When such policies are formalized by a legislature into law, rather than remaining only executive measures, they are categorically referred to as "social legislation."

=== Health policy ===
Health care delivery and directives, public health, health insurance (including nationalized, health-centric social insurance varieties like Medicare), hospital organization, sexual health, and wellbeing are considered central areas of the health policy subset of social policy.

=== Education policy ===
Access to K-12 public education, college finance and admissions (higher education), teacher training, pedagogy, school disciplinary action, credit/student/teacher transferability, and related educational issues are elements of education policy, as a subset of social policy. Some analysts view education policy as social engineering.

=== Labor policy ===
Labor market support, upward mobility, and economic security in the form of minimum wage laws, workforce development, workplace protections, unemployment insurance, job creation, poverty recidivism, welfare assistance, collective bargaining and worker rights, and contract labour are elements of the labor policy subset of social policy. Often, these policies are considered part of labour law.

=== Aging and pension policy ===
Pensions, caregiving, social security (a form of social insurance), retirement policy and retirement planning, and issues related to aging societies are connected to social policy. In the U.S., AARP was founded to advance these issues and political equity for senior citizens and is today the largest lobbying organization in America.

=== Human services ===
Human services are the subset of social policy that oversee community welfare offices and social care organizations. These include family policies such as child protection and children's and family services. Human services may also include the administration of criminal justice and law enforcement. Many countries and states consider housing policy, such as social housing, distribution of homelessness resources, and bettering living conditions to be human services as well.

=== Cultural issues ===
Citizenship policy, cultural policy, and cultural affairs; civil liberties; abortion legality; animal rights and animal welfare; agricultural and food policy; urban development; social exclusion; immigration; sexuality issues; and more are considered as significant cultural or social issues under the umbrage of social policy. The discussion of 'social policy,' in a North American context, certainly applies to governmental policy on social issues such as approaches to racial issues, LGBT issues (such as same-sex marriage) and the legal status of abortion, guns, euthanasia, recreational drugs and prostitution. Friendship interventions and policy can reduce loneliness. In other countries, these issues would be classified under health policy and domestic policy.

== International approaches ==
=== United States social policy ===
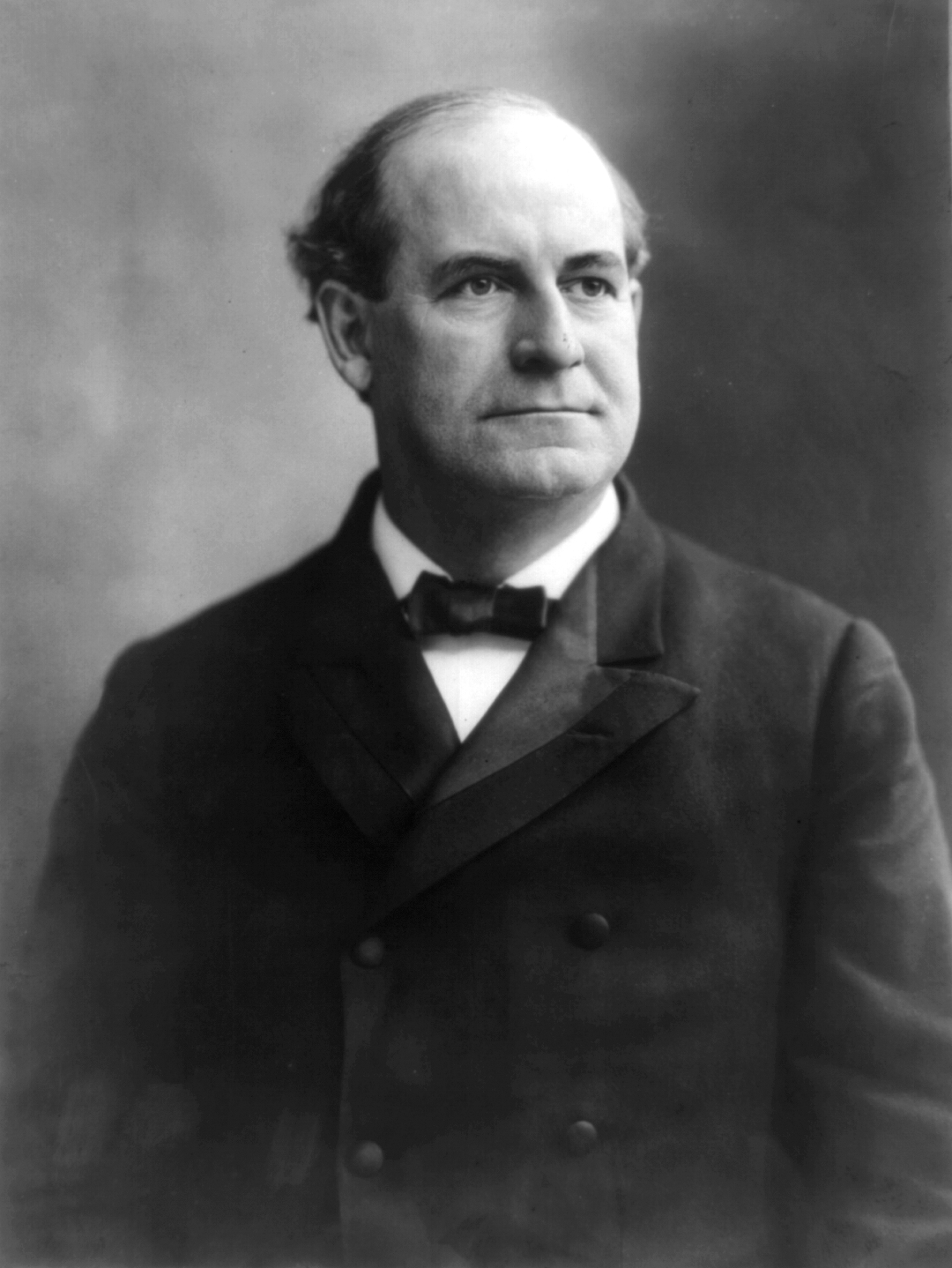
A 1908 photo of William Jennings Bryan, a champion of social justice and former U.S. Secretary of State, the first major U.S. political figure to incorporate social policy into government policies

==== Socioeconomic policy by administration ====
- Social policy of the second Trump administration
- Economic policy of the second Trump administration
- Social policy of the Biden administration
- Economic policy of the Biden administration
- Social policy of the first Trump administration
- Economic policy of the first Trump administration
- Social policy of the Obama administration
- Economic policy of the Obama administration
- Economic policy of the George W. Bush administration
- Economic policy of the Clinton administration

==== Federal jurisdiction ====
At the federal level, the major areas of U.S. social policy are addressed by the United States Senate Committee on Health, Education, Labor and Pensions, known as the HELP Committee. A complementary committee in the House of Representatives has jurisdiction over these issues, but it changes its name each time a different party comes to power.

==== Factors to U.S. social policy ====
The United States was a pioneer in generous social spending (relative to comparable countries), providing substantial support for Civil War veterans and their families. However, the United States would go on to lag behind other advanced industrial democracies in social spending. Religious, racial, ideological, scientific, and philosophical movements and ideas have historically influenced American social views and shaped policy debates. For example, while American collectivism was greatly impacted by Methodism and Quakerism, denominations which helped thrust the social tenets of Christianity to the forefront of developing the welfare state and laws against child labor, more conservative and Calvinistic denominations (based on teachings of John Calvin and his idea of pre-destination) and the Protestant Values of hard work and individualism, might be seen as stymying social welfare. Moreover, Social Darwinism helped mold America's ideas of capitalism and the survival of the fittest mentality. The temperance movement, labor movement, women's rights movement, environmental movement, and the Catholic Church's social teaching have also been considerably influential to the development of social welfare debates in America.

==== Federal social insurance programs ====
President Franklin D. Roosevelt's groundbreaking New Deal is a prime example of social policy that focused predominantly on providing work and stimulating the economy through public spending on projects, rather than on cash payments. The programs were in response to the Great Depression affecting the United States in the 1930s, including Social Security (United States). United States politicians who have favored increasing government observance of social policy often do not frame their proposals around typical notions of welfare or benefits; instead, in cases like Medicare and Medicaid, President Lyndon B. Johnson presented a package called the Great Society that framed a larger vision around poverty and quality of life.

==== Federal education policy ====
Intellectual earlier citizens who shaped public schooling clearly to be an American ideal and toward being a civic "institution" of its budding democracy include Samuel Adams, Manasseh Cutler, Nathan Dane, Thomas Jefferson, and Horace Mann; among more.

President Lyndon B. Johnson would also attempt to implement education policy under his Great Society package, introducing several programs and laws, such as the Elementary and Secondary Education Act of 1965 (ESEA), Higher Education Act of 1965 (HEA), and the Bilingual Education Act of 1967 (BEA), and many others. These laws would form the backbone of the education policy changes of the No Child Left Behind Act (NCLB), introduced during the administration of Republican President George W. Bush with bipartisan support. The law took effect on 8 January 2002, aiming to raise standards in education, address educational inequities (framed as an achievement gap), and address school issues framed as matters of accountability. The No Child Left Behind Act required every state to assess students on basic skills to receive federal funding. While the law did attempt to address issues underlying U.S. education, its provisions were widely viewed as unsuccessful. States continued to create their own standards while assessing themselves. NCLB also led to the closure of numerous schools labeled "low-performing" or "failing", disproportionately impacting schools that served predominantly Black students and rural communities. Provisions of NCLB were changed and replaced under the Race to the Top (R2T, RTTT or RTT) and Every Child Succeeds Act (ESSA) passed during the Administration of President Barack Obama.

==== Federal health policy ====
Major examples of U.S. health policy are HIPAA, Medicare (United States), and Medicaid. Insurance has been a growing policy topic, and a recent example of health care law as social policy is the Patient Protection and Affordable Care Act (ACA) formed by the 111th U.S. Congress and signed into law by President Barack Obama, a Democrat, on 23 March 2010. The ACA established HealthCare.gov as the national online exchange, or "marketplace", for health insurance programs offered state by state.

==== Federal assistance programs ====
- WIC program - Women, Infants, and Children program
- Supplemental Nutrition Assistance Program - food stamps
- Temporary Assistance for Needy Families - called TANF

== See also ==
- Human services
- Precariat
- Social insurance
- Social issue
- Social planning
- Social services
- Social theory
- Upward mobility
- Welfare state
- Welfare spending
