= Jane Lewis (academic) =

British social scientist

Jane Elizabeth Lewis, FRSC, FBA (born 14 April 1950) is a British social scientist and academic, specialising in gender and welfare. She was Barnett Professor of Social Policy at the University of Oxford from 2000 to 2004 and Professor of Social Policy at the London School of Economics from 2004 to 2016.

== Early life and education ==
Lewis was born on 14 April 1950. From 1968 to 1971, she studied history at the University of Reading: she graduated with an upper second class Bachelor of Arts (BA) degree. She moved to Canada, undertaking further studies at the University of Western Ontario, and completed her Doctor of Philosophy (PhD) degree in 1979. Her doctoral thesis was titled "The Politics of Motherhood: Child and Maternal Welfare in England, 1900-1939".

== Academic career ==
In 1979, Lewis returned to England and joined the Department of Social Policy and Administration at the London School of Economics (LSE) as a lecturer. She was promoted to Reader in 1987 and appointed Professor of Social Policy in 1991. In 1996, she joined the University of Oxford as Director of the Wellcome Unit for the History of Medicine and was elected a Fellow of All Souls College, Oxford. She was made a Quondam Fellow of All Souls College in 1998: a Quondam Fellow is a former fellow and not part of the college's governing body.

Between 1998 and 2000, Lewis was Professor of Social Policy at the University of Nottingham. In 2000, she returned to the University of Oxford having been appointed Barnett Professor of Social Policy and was elected a Fellow of St Cross College, Oxford. She returned to the London School of Economics as Professor of Social Policy in 2004, and remained there until her retirement in 2016. She was then appointed Emeritus Professor by LSE.

== Honours ==
In 1995, Lewis was elected a Fellow of the Royal Society of Canada (FRSC), the national academy of Canada. In 2004, she was elected a Fellow of the British Academy (FBA), the United Kingdom's national academy for the humanities and social sciences.

== Selected works ==
- Lewis, Jane (1991). Women and social action in Victorian and Edwardian England. Stanford, CA: Stanford University Press. ISBN 978-0804719056.
- Lewis, Jane (2001). The end of marriage?: individualism and intimate relations. Cheltenham: Elgar. ISBN 978-1840642872.
- Lewis, Jane (2009). Work-family balance, gender and policy. Cheltenham: Edward Elgar. ISBN 978-1848442115.
- Lewis, Jane (1980). The Politics of Motherhood: Child and Maternal Welfare in England, 1900-1939. Montreal: McGill-Queen's University Press. doi:10.2307/j.ctt1w6t8tn. ISBN 978-0-7735-9325-1.
