= Party Politics =

- Discipline: Political Science
- Language: English
- Edited by: Paul Webb

Publication details
- History: 1995–present
- Publisher: SAGE Publications
- Frequency: Bimonthly
- Impact factor: 2.324 (2017)

Standard abbreviations
- ISO 4: Party Polit.

Indexing
- CODEN: PAPOFH
- ISSN: 1354-0688 (print); 1460-3683 (web)
- LCCN: sn95026491
- OCLC no.: 31946567

Links
- Journal homepage; Online access; Online archive

Party Politics is a peer-reviewed academic journal that publishes papers in the field of political science, focusing on political parties and organizations. The journal's editor is Paul Webb of the University of Sussex, UK. It has been in publication since 1995 and is currently published by SAGE Publications.

== Scope ==
Party Politics provides a written forum for the analysis of political parties, including their historical development, structure, policy programmes, ideology, electoral and campaign strategies as well as their role within the various national and international political systems of which they are a part. It is a bi-monthly, peer-reviewed journal dedicated to the study of political science.

== Abstracting and indexing ==
Part Politics is abstracted and indexed in, among other databases: SCOPUS, and the Social Sciences Citation Index. According to the Journal Citation Reports, the journal has a 2017 impact factor of 2.324, ranking it 35th out of 169 journals in the category "Political Science".
