= Ramona High School (Ramona, San Diego County, California) =

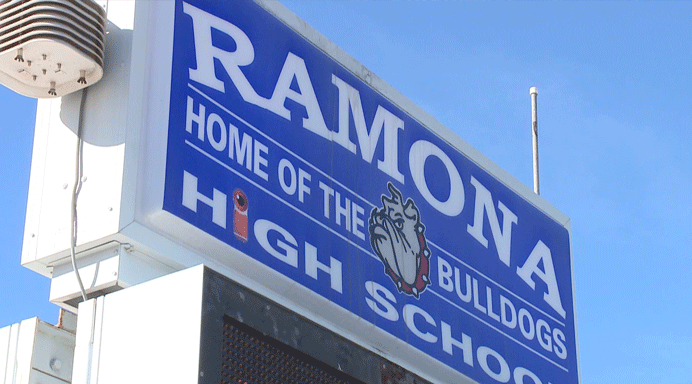

Location
- 1401 Hanson Lane; Ramona, California; United States
- Coordinates: 33.0269°N 116.8692°W

Information
- Type: Public secondary
- Motto: "Excellence, it's a matter of pride!"
- Established: 1894
- School district: RCUSD
- Principal: Antoinette Rodriguez
- Grades: 9–12
- Enrollment: 1,404 (2024-2025)
- Campus: Suburban
- Color: Royal Blue White
- Mascot: The Bulldog
- Rival: Poway High School
- SAT&ACT average: 1551
- Yearbook

Ramona High School (RHS) is located in Ramona, California. Ramona High is a member of the Ramona City Unified School District and serves the communities of Ramona, San Diego Country Estates, and citizens of the surrounding rural area as well as small numbers of people from Santa Ysabel and Julian.

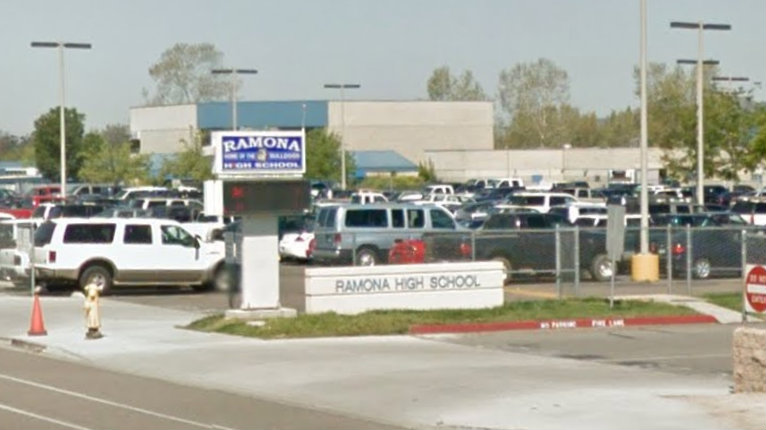
Ramona High School in 2016

== History ==
Throughout most of the 1800s, Ramona consisted of many one-room schools that served students of many different ages. As the population of Ramona began to rapidly grow in the late nineteenth century, the need for a high school arose. Ramona High School was first established in 1894 holding classes in the attic of the Ramona Town Hall. The conditions of this location proved to be far too uncomfortable which led to a bell tower-like building being constructed on 9th and D Street which would serve as the Ramona High School Campus from 1898-1911. In 1912 another building was constructed on 9th Street adjacent to the football field, this building would hold Ramona High School classes from 1912-1936. From 1936-1969 Ramona High School classes were held in a larger building also facing Ninth Street, this building currently serves as the John H. Wilson Administrative Center. From 1969 to present, classes have been held on the much larger Ramona High School campus on Hanson Lane Road.

== Demographics ==
The school is composed of around 2,000 students, with a demographic breakdown of about 52% Hispanic, 43% Caucasian, 4% African American, and about 1% of other races.

== Athletics ==
The school boasts a successful varsity sports program which includes: football, boys' water polo, girls' volleyball, cross country, girls' golf, girls' tennis, girls' basketball, girls' basketball, wrestling, boys' soccer, girls' soccer, girls' water polo, track & field, swim & dive, cheer & song, boys' volleyball, boys' golf, boys' tennis, baseball, girls' lacrosse, and softball. RHS also has a choir, marching band, and Navy JROTC program.

== Academics ==
The school offers a number of AP Courses, including AP Calculus, AP English, AP US History, AP European History, AP Chemistry, AP Biology, AP Environmental Science, AP Spanish Language, AP Statistics, AP Art History and AP Economics. According to the LA Times, the average SAT score at Ramona High School was 1551 out of a possible 2400 for the 2011–2012 academic school year. Ramona High School also offers automotive and welding classes.

== Notable alumni ==
Name	Grad class	Category	Best known for
Nick Vincent		Sports	MLB pitcher for the Miami Marlins
Travis Knight		Sports	Center for the University of Connecticut and the Boston Celtics
Cole Sulser		Sports	MLB pitcher
Beau Sulser		Sports	MLB pitcher|
Derek Diamond		Sports	MiLB pitcher
