= Greater London Group =

British research centre (1958–1998)

The Greater London Group was a research centre at the London School of Economics that was created in 1958, to prepare analysis and advice to the Royal Commission on Local Government in Greater London, founded the previous year. Chaired by William A. Robson, it expanded on his previous work focusing on issues of London government, with input and debate from the other members of the newly formed group. It has been recognised as having had a significant impact during the 1960s and upon the creation of the Greater London Council in 1965. It continued operating until 1998, when it was reformulated as LSE London, hosted by the Department of Geography and Environment of the London School of Economics.

== History ==
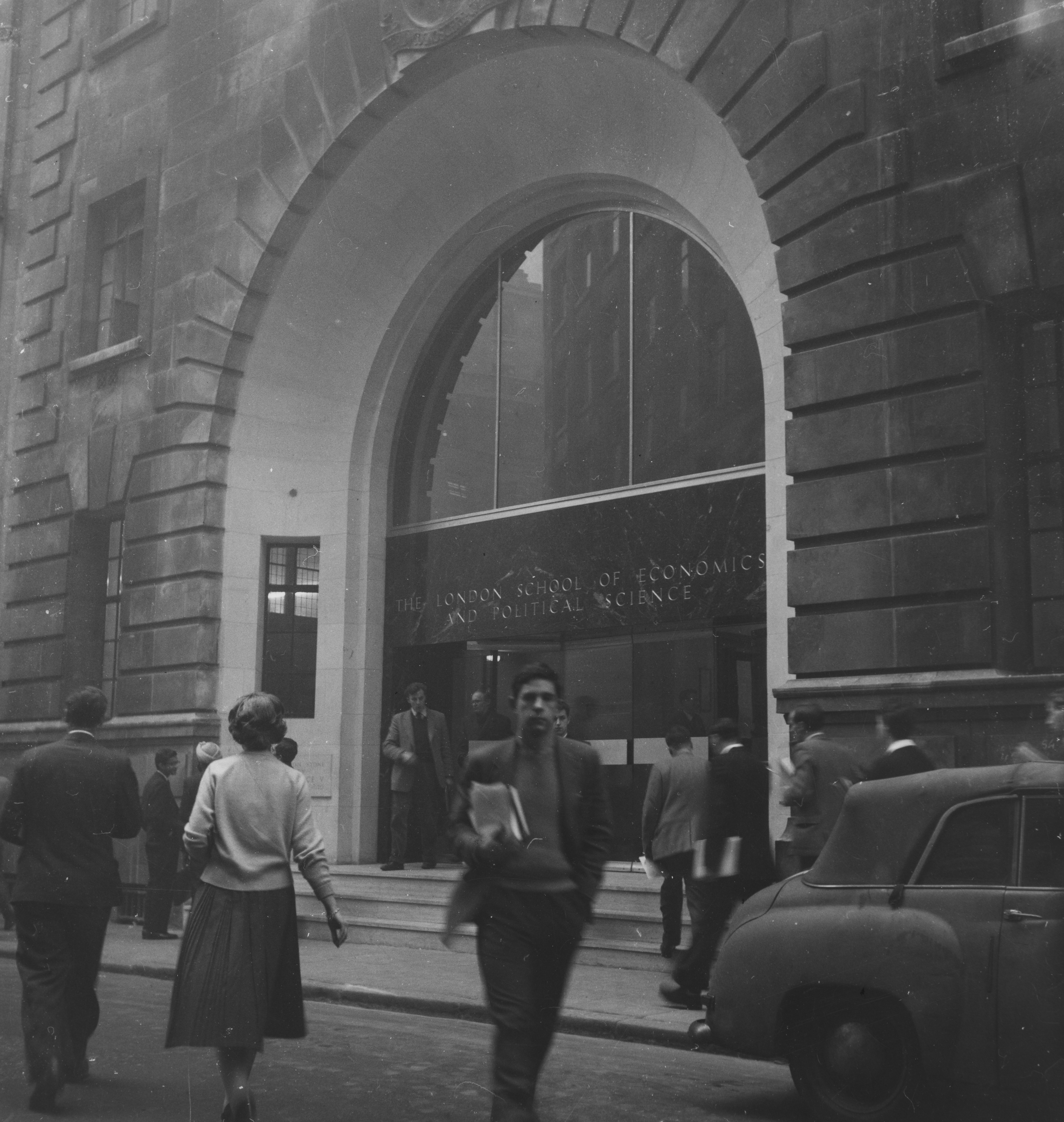
The LSE Old Building in the 1950s, one of the places where the group had its offices

In 1957, the Royal Commission on Local Government in Greater London (a.k.a. the Herbert Commission) was established. Professor William A. Robson, at the London School of Economics and Political Science (commonly the London School of Economics (LSE)) had focused his research on issues of local government in London for some time. In 1958, he founded the Greater London Group to facilitate input to the Herbert Commission, bringing together a group of academics to analyse, debate and prepare input.

The group shared interest in what direction the growing metropolis, and its government, should go in. Early members of the group came from a variety of disciplines, including social administration expert David Donnison, geographer Michael Wise, political scientist Richard Pear, and scholar of public administration Peter Self. In 1959 the group put forth a Memorandum of Evidence in an attempt to define an area that would form a central London borough.

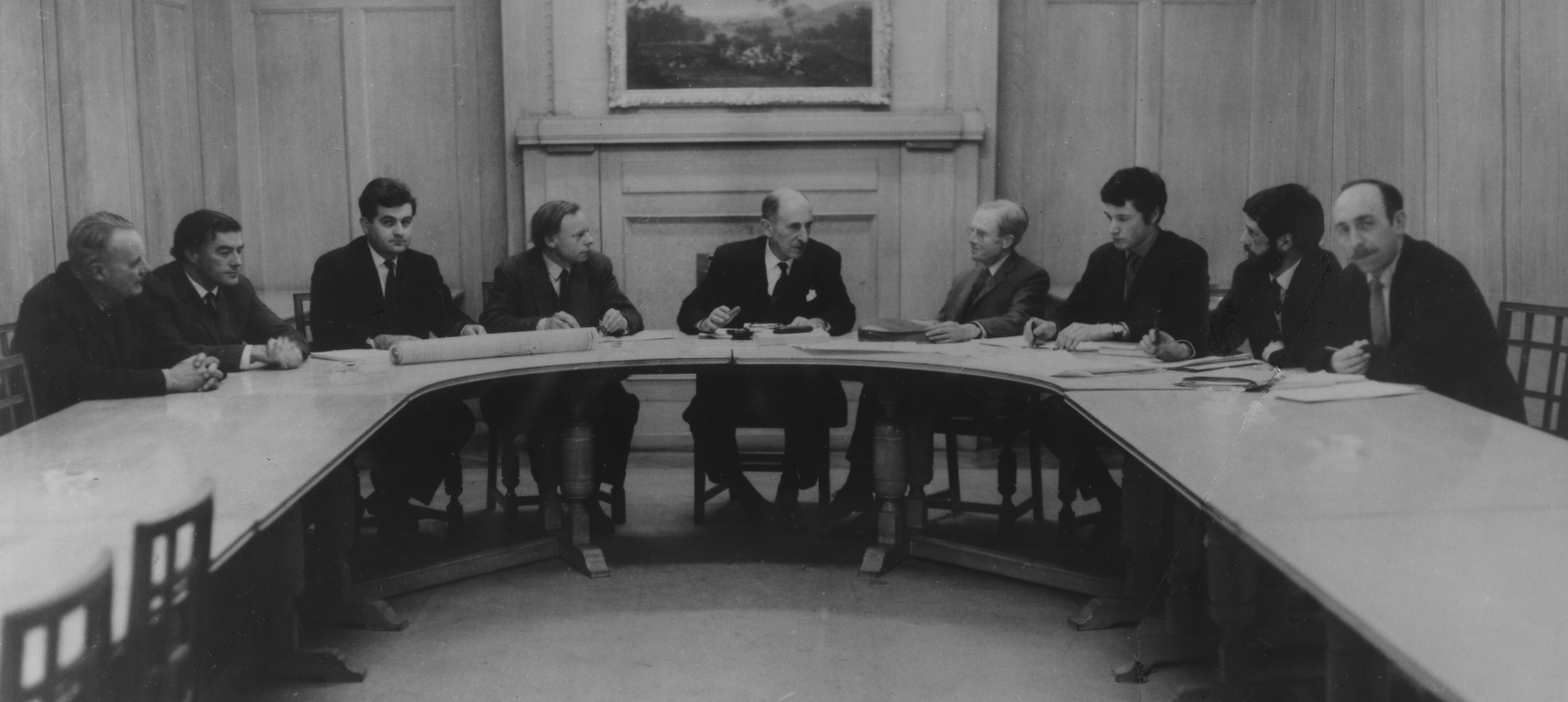
The Greater London Group in June 1968: Ken Ruck, Michael Thomson, George Jones, Gerald Rhodes, William Robson, Gilbert Ponsonby, Gordon Peters, Ken Young, and David Regan

Robson kept the group going after the commission report, to study what happened next. By 1960, the group had, as one later account wrote, "earned a reputation as the leading centre for the study of London government". By 1963, it had more than a dozen members, who held a variety of views. The group met every Monday afternoon to review and discuss papers or hear from visiting speakers. Its offices tended to move around a lot, but included a stint in LSE's Old Building.

The group's members also were significantly overlapped with those of the Town and Country Planning Association, which in part added to the group's effectiveness. Indeed, the group has been recognised as having had a significant impact upon efforts to reform London government during the 1960s and upon the creation of the Greater London Council in 1965. Later members in the group included the likes of Jeffrey Jowell and Peter Hall. The group also had a number of research officers attached to it, who authored reports and some of whom, like Ken Young, went on to prominent academic careers of their own.

== Leadership ==
Robson was the main leader of the group until his death in 1980. Following that, the group was led by Self, and then after that, in a co-chair arrangement, by Derek Diamond and George W. Jones. Diamond retired from the LSE and also stepped down as chair of the Group in 1995. Later, the director of the group became Tony Travers, under whose leadership the group became more active and visible.

== LSE London ==
Out of the Greater London Group, LSE London was then established in 1998, as a research group hosted by the Department of Geography and Environment of the London School of Economics. However, the Greater London Group was still recognised under its name in newspaper stories as late as 2009 and 2010 and 2012.

Today, LSE London conducts research on the economic and social issues that affect the London region and has gained a strong international reputation particularly in the fields of social and demographic change, housing, finance and governance, becoming the leading academic group at the London School of Economics for analyses of city-wide developments in London. As of April 2024, Tony Travers – the final director of the Greater London Group – has been director of LSE London since its establishment.
