= Riot City: Protest and Rebellion in the Capital =

Book by Clive Bloom Dr

- Cover of the first edition
- Author: Clive Bloom
- Language: English
- Subjects: Politics of London, protest movements, political activism
- Set in: London
- Published: Basingstoke
- Publisher: Palgrave Macmillan
- Publication date: 2012
- Publication place: United Kingdom
- Media type: Print
- Pages: 185
- ISBN: 9781137029355
- Dewey Decimal: 303.6230942109051

Riot City: Protest and Rebellion in the Capital is a 2012 book by British academic, broadcaster and author, Clive Bloom. The book deals with the history of protest movements in London and political radicalism in the capital.

== Background ==
Clive Bloom is an Emeritus Professor of English and American studies at Middlesex University. The book examines the rebellion in the city, particularly examining radical political movements. It investigates Occupy London, the 2010 United Kingdom student protests alongside historic movements. Bloom writes that 'protest is the raw and vital edge of being a Londoner'.

== Reception ==
Chris Gilson, from the London School of Economics and Political Science wrote that the book was a 'timely work', while the book was also reviewed in the Financial Times, and The Spectator.
