= School of Public Policy at Central European University =

Public policy school of Central European University

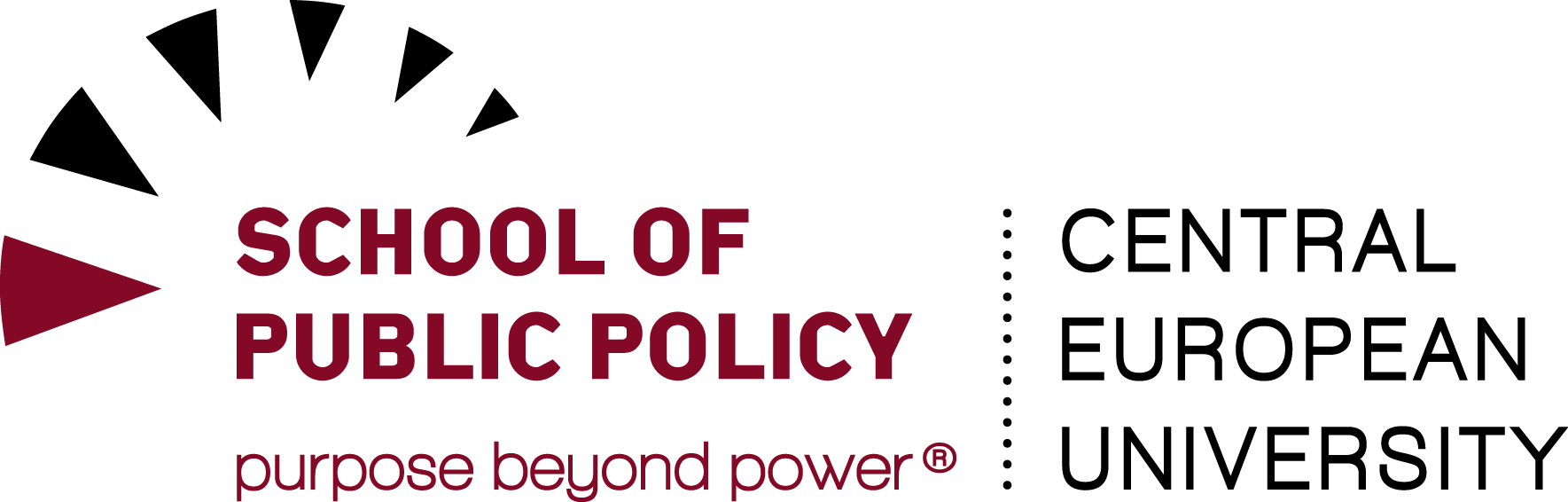
- Type: Private
- Established: 2012
- Head: Diane Stone
- Postgraduates: 140
- Location: Budapest, Vienna, Hungary, Austria
- Campus: Urban
- Affiliations: University of the State of New York
- Website: dpp.ceu.edu

The Department of Public Policy, formerly School of Public Policy (SPP) at Central European University (CEU) is an English-language graduate institution with campuses in Budapest and Vienna. CEU was founded by philanthropist George Soros.

It is accredited in the U.S. and Hungary. SPP offers graduate programs in public policy tailored for students seeking careers in the public, private, and not-for-profit sectors at the local, national, and international levels. There are currently around 140 students from around 60 countries enrolled at SPP.

== History ==
Launched in 2012, SPP grew from two existing master's degrees developed by the foundation Professor of Public Policy at CEU, Diane Stone with Agnes Batory and Uwe Puetter. These are a one-year MA in Public Policy launched in 2004 and a two-year Erasmus Mundus degree in Public Policy launched in 2007. SPP is committed to “construct[ing] a community of ‘purpose beyond power.’” Founding Dean Wolfgang Reinicke believes that “the traditional model of Western democracy is in ‘deep crisis’” and founded SPP to “do our part to improve governance” through multidisciplinary research and a practice-oriented curriculum to educate future changemakers.

SPP’s two-year Master of Public Administration program combines knowledge, skills, and practice. The School currently offers three master’s programs in public policy and the public policy track of the PhD in Political Science at the CEU Doctoral School of Political Science, Public Policy and International Relations.

== Administration and Organization ==
CEU is governed by a board of trustees, with a charter from the Board of Regents of the University of the State of New York, for and on behalf of the New York State Education Department. In the United States, CEU is accredited by the Commission on Higher Education of the Middle States Association of Colleges and Schools. In Hungary, CEU is officially recognized as a privately maintained and operated university. The university was accredited by the Hungarian Accreditation Committee in 2004.

SPP’s advisory board is composed of Deepa Narayan, Joseph S. Nye, Jr., Ghassan Salamé, Anne-Marie Slaughter, Javier Solana, Yasmin Sooka, and Alexander G. Soros.

== Academics ==
=== Degrees ===
Currently, SPP offers three master's degrees: a two-year Master of Public Administration (MPA), a one-year Master of Public Policy (One-year MAPP), and a two-year Erasmus Mundus Master of Arts in Public Policy (Mundus MAPP).

SPP is also home to the public policy track of the CEU Doctoral School of Political Science, Public Policy and International Relations.

==== MPA ====
The MPA curriculum integrates three components: knowledge, skills, and practice. Students can choose concentrations in development, global media and communication, governance, security and higher education.

Skills courses are delivered through the Skills For Impact (SFI) program.

Students gain practical experience in policy through a mandatory internship and the Applied Policy Project. Applied Policy Projects are client-driven and student-run, policy-oriented capstone projects. Passion Project clients have included Freedom Now and the European Stability Initiative (ESI).

==== One-year MAPP ====
The MAPP curriculum integrates three components: knowledge, a thesis, and policy practice. Students can choose from seven concentrations: European public policy; international public policy; decentralized governance; higher education policy and management; media, information and communications policy; equality and social justice; and political and economic development. One-year MAPP students must also submit a thesis.

Students gain practical experience in policy through either a summer internship or a policy lab. In a policy lab, small student teams work together to produce original research for an external client like UNHCR and OSCE.

==== Mundus MAPP ====
Mundus MAPP is a two-year program formerly funded by the European Commission. Students study at two of the following four universities: Central European University, International Institute of Social Studies of Erasmus University Rotterdam (The Netherlands), Institut Barcelona d'Estudis Internacionals (Spain), and the University of York (UK). “The program equips graduates with the conceptual knowledge and hard skills that are necessary for understanding and decisively intervening in contemporary transnational policy problems, from climate change to international terrorism or financial regulatory failure.”

=== Global Policy Academy (GPA) ===
GPA organizes academically rigorous and policy-relevant certificate courses. It is a member of the Organization for Security and Co-operation in Europe (OSCE) Network of Think Thanks and Academic Institutions.

Courses include “Reversing the Resource Curse” co-organized with the Natural Resource Governance Institute (NRGI) and a political advisor course for Eastern Partners co-organized with the Folke Bernadotte Academy (FBA), the OSCE Office for Democratic Institutions and Human Rights (ODIHR).

=== Open Society Internship for Rights and Governance (OSIRG) ===
SPP offers the OSIRG program each summer in cooperation with the Open Society Foundations (OSF). Launched in 2013, it is designed to inspire a new cohort of practitioners committed to working both in the public interest and at the forefront of global policy.

=== Global Challenges Fellowship (GCF) ===
GCF invites researchers and practitioners from nine emerging countries to conduct relevant policy research at SPP and the Institute of Advanced Studies at CEU and the Global Public Policy Institute in Berlin, Germany. The program selects two junior and two senior fellows each year and is supported by the Volkswagen Stiftung.

== Rankings ==
SPP is included in CEU’s ranking as 29th worldwide in politics and international studies in 2015.

== Research Centers ==
=== Shattuck Center on Conflict, Negotiation and Recovery (CCNR) ===
The Shattuck brings together academics, policymakers, activists, and researchers to develop an effective response to a pressing issue. It develops policy tools to prevent conflict or aid in the recovery from violence.

Each year the Shattuck Center hosts the Lemkin Reunion, a gathering of policymakers involved in responding to atrocity crimes and assess the lessons they learned. It is named in honor of Raphael Lemkin, the Polish lawyer who lost his family in the Holocaust and first coined the word genocide.

The Shattuck Center launched the Aleppo Project in September 2014. The Aleppo Project is an open collaboration among Syrian refugees, students, academics, policy experts, and others to propose ideas on how to rebuild urban life in Aleppo after the conflict ends. The Aleppo Project is developing crowd-source mapping software in cooperation with the Columbia Graduate School of Architecture, Planning and Preservation in New York.

=== Center for Media, Data and Society (CMDS) ===
CMDS produces scholarly and practice-oriented research addressing academic, policy, and civil society needs related to media, communication, and information policy. It is a member of the Global Network of Interdisciplinary Internet & Society Research Centers.

Kate Coyer, director of the Civil Society and Technology Project at CMDS, led a team that provided internet access to refugees using 3G mobile hot spots at Budapest’s Keleti train station during the peak of the refugee crisis in August and September 2014. “Phones are among their [refugees’] most valued possessions,” Coyer said in an interview.

=== Center for European Union Research ===
The Center for European Union Research (CEUR) at CEU is directed by Uwe Puetter. CEUR promotes academic research and discussion in the field of European Union studies. CEUR currently brings together 18 CEU faculty members from the Departments of Economics, Legal Studies, International Relations and European Studies, Political Science and Public Policy.

== Student life ==
SPP currently has around 140 students from around 60 countries across six continents. The average age of the student body is 27.
