= William A. Robson =

English jurist and reformer

William A. Robson

William Alexander Robson (14 July 1895 – 12 May 1980) was a British academic who was an early and influential scholar of public administration while serving as a lecturer and professor at the London School of Economics. Upon his death, The Guardian wrote that Robson was an "internationally renowned authority on public administration". Indeed, Robson played a key role in establishing public administration as an academic subject.

Robson was also a lawyer, author, and editor. He co-founded the influential journal The Political Quarterly in 1930 and remained a co-editor of it until 1975. With associations to George Bernard Shaw, Leonard Woolf, and Sidney and Beatrice Webb, Robson was known for being a Fabian, to the extent that his obituary in The Times stated that he "was the last of the great generation of Fabian scholars".

== Early life, military service, and education ==
Robson was born in a rural part of Middlesex, that would later become part of Greater London and would be known as North Finchley. His father was a buyer and seller of pearls in Hatton Garden, which was sufficient to give a middle-class living. It was a Jewish family and Robson was brought up in that religion, but like many Fabians, he later adopted a perspective of humanist agnosticism.

Robson left school at age 15, without taking examinations, as the death of his father left the family in financial difficulties. He got a job as a clerk for the Grahame-White Aviation Company, which operated Hendon Aerodrome; then while still in his teens became the assistant manager of the aerodrome.

With the air conflict during World War I underway, Robson joined the Royal Flying Corps in 1915. Part of the RFC's Military Wing, he was a fighter pilot.

In early 1916, while in service, Robson published with Macmillan a book about aviation, Aircraft in War and Peace. In a review at the time, Flight magazine described the book as portraying, in non-technical language, the past, present, and possible future roles of aircraft, as well as how aircraft are built and how pilots are trained. A retrospective review characterized it as "a rather good wartime book" that captured some of the sensations flyers felt when they were aloft.

In July 1916, Robson was promoted to Second Lieutenant. He served in France, and also in defence of his home country during nighttime Zeppelin raids against London. He eventually held the rank of Lieutenant. He left the service, by this time known as the Royal Air Force, in 1919.

Robson's life took a fortuitous turn towards the end of the war. Famed playwright and polemicist George Bernard Shaw, eager to seem modern with the times, wanted to take an aeroplane flight, and (since he had read Aircraft in War and Peace) chose Robson to give him that experience. After landing, Robson admitted to having no plans for after the war, in response to which Shaw said he should go to the London School of Economics (LSE) and wrote him a note of introduction to Sidney Webb, co-founder of the school. Having left school at a young age, Robson lacked the necessary qualifications for entry to the LSE, but with the urging of Shaw and upon the recommendation of Webb and his wife Beatrice Webb, another co-founder of the school, he was admitted. As Robson later observed, "however well we plan, there is a lot of accident in career and history."

Robson earned a B.Sc. in Economics with first-class honours from the LSE in 1922, followed by a Ph.D. in 1924. He was at the same time reading law, and was called to the bar at Lincoln's Inn in 1922. He earned an LL.M. in 1928.

== Career ==
Robson entered the chambers of Sir Henry Slesser, devilling for him when he was Solicitor General in 1924; this gave Robson early insight into how governments operate. Robson's initial academic position was lecturer in Industrial and Administrative Law at the LSE from 1926 to 1933, followed by Reader in Administrative Law from 1933 to 1947.

Robson married the French native Juliette Alvin (1897–1982), an internationally known cellist, in 1929. In that same year she became a British citizen. The couple had two sons and a daughter. She would become a pioneering music therapist. Remarks Robson made in America in 1923 drew the ire of syndicated columnist Winifred Black. Robson deplored the fate of highly educated women who after becoming a bride found their mental abilities "stagnating in the backwater of marriage." Black stressed the traditional values of being a wife and mother and said they required skills equal to that of most occupations.

The idea of starting a serious political journal came to Robson and Kingsley Martin, who also had a teaching position at the LSE at the time. Among its goals was to publish articles which would span the difference between theory and practice. Figures involved with the founding or funding of The Political Quarterly included Bernard Shaw and John Maynard Keynes. However, Robson's lack of enthusiasm for the Soviet Union, compared to that of some other Fabian socialists, led to a partial split with Shaw during the 1930s. As an editor, The Times characterised Robson as "stern and terrible in his demand for high standards and good English, however illustrious the contributor, but always patient and dutiful in reading contributions from unknown authors."

During World War II, Robson served in several roles. He was a principal in the Mines Department within the Board of Trade from 1940 to 1942, then for the Ministry of Fuel and Power from 1942 to 1943. After that he received a promotion to assistant secretary in the Air Ministry, which he held from 1943 to 1945. Finally he served in the Ministry of Civil Aviation until such time as British demobilisation began occurring.

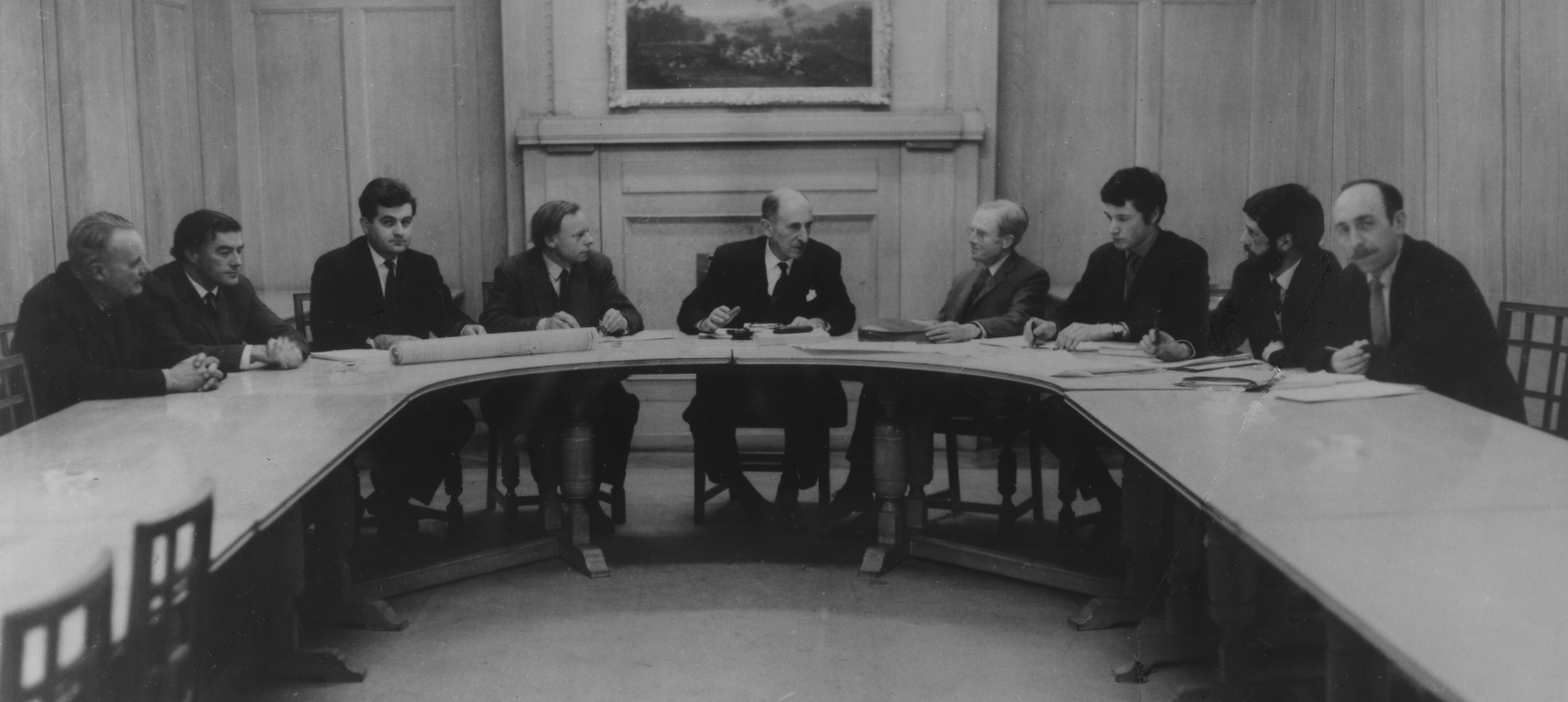
Robson (center) with the Greater London Group in 1968

After the war, Robson was named Professor of Public Administration in 1947, becoming the first such professor not just within the University of London system, but the first in the United Kingdom. He founded the Greater London Group research centre at the LSE in 1958, whose initial purpose was to conduct research on behalf of the Royal Commission on Local Government in Greater London. Robson urged the idea of what one assessment has termed "a general purpose single municipality for London with smaller boroughs below", and while there were disagreements within the group on this matter, Robson's view held the most sway with the commission, and the group has been recognized as having had a significant impact upon efforts to reform London government during the 1960s and upon the creation of the Greater London Council in 1965. Robson was the main leader of the Greater London Group until his death.

Robson was a co-founder of the Political Studies Association in the UK, and was very active in the formative years of the International Political Science Association, serving as its second president beginning in 1952. Robson also served at some point as vice president of the Royal Institute of Public Administration. Possessed of an international reputation, Robson did consulting work in city planning in countries that included Turkey, Lebanon, Nigeria, and Japan, and his former students became influential in areas such as India, West Africa, and the United States.

Robson was known for meticulous scholarship. Some of Robson's most important books include The Town Councillor (1925, co-authored with Clement Attlee, at the time MP for Limehouse), Justice and Administrative Law (1928), The Development of Local Government (1931), Civilization and the Growth of Law (1935), The Government and Misgovernment of London (1939, revised 1948), Nationalised Industry and Public Ownership (1960), Local Government in Crisis (1966), and Welfare State and Welfare Society (1976).

An LSE retrospective has stated that Robson was "[f]requently described as stern and austere". He had a difficult relationship with two well-known heads of the Department of Government there, Harold Laski and Michael Oakeshott. The political scientist Ken Young, who at the start of his career was a research officer with the Greater London Group, has said that Robson always had difficulty in persuading others to adopt an idea or policy. Nonetheless, Robson had the viewpoint of a reformer. George W. Jones has written:

He was an idealist who sought to use his talents to serve society, and to improve the quality of life, not only materially but also morally. His great ability was to assemble a huge mass of data, and to analyse order out of complexity, and to argue a coherent case for change. ... He was as if compelled by a sense of public duty to put his learning and scholarship to the service of society.

Robson held the Professor of Public Administration title until 1962. At that point he retired and became Professor Emeritus, but continued to be active in writing and teaching to the end of his life. By then living in the London Borough of Haringey, Robson died on 12 May 1980.

A tribute journal article published the following year said of Robson, "That overworked term 'seminal' may justly be ascribed to his work on public law, public enterprise, and local government."

== Awards and honours ==
During his life Robson was awarded eight honorary doctorates from universities. These include four from French universities granted during the 1950s, as well as three from establishments in his own country.

A Festschrift was published in 1976: From policy to administration: essays in honour of William A. Robson, edited by J. A. G. Griffith.

The annual William Robson Memorial Prize is given to the best Ph.D. dissertation published at the LSE.
