= London's Boroughs at 50 =

- First edition
- Author: Professor Tony Travers
- Language: English
- Subject: Politics of London; London boroughs
- Published: London
- Publisher: Biteback Publishing
- Publication date: 2015
- Publication place: United Kingdom
- Pages: 388
- ISBN: 9781849549196
- Dewey Decimal: 942.1

London's Boroughs at 50 is a 2015 book by British academic and journalist Professor Tony Travers, published by Biteback Publishing.

== Background and synopsis ==
London's Boroughs at 50 is a history of local governance in London, focusing on the period since the creation of Greater London and the London boroughs in 1965. The book also included an analysis of how the capital has changed during that period starting with Swinging London to the current Global city. Furthermore, London's Boroughs at 50 profiles some of the personalities who have shaped the governance of London such as Ken Livingstone, Shirley Porter and Boris Johnson.

== Reception ==
In The Guardian Dave Hill wrote "my advice about this book is simple: buy it today and read it" and described it as a "learned, entertaining and affectionate history of the capital’s resilient local government system that also tells a bigger story of the city itself" In Progress magazine, Richard Arthur, the former Labour leader of the London Borough of Camden, in his review, wrote that "Tony Travers, the leading expert on London, provides a dispassionate account of each borough as well as an overall analysis"

BBC Radio London interviewed Travers about the book
