= Annette Boaz =

British academic

Annette Boaz is a UK-based academic working on the relationship between research, policy and practice. She is Professor of Health and Social Care at King's College London, and Director of the NIHR Health and Social Care Workforce Research Unit.

== Academic and policy career ==
In 2005 Boaz co-founded the academic journal Evidence & Policy with Ken Young. The quarterly journal focuses on the relationship between research evidence and public policy. Between 2005 and 2017 Annette Boaz served as the editor in chief.

In October 2019 Boaz was elected as a Fellow of the Academy of Social Sciences.

Annette Boaz is the co-founder with Kathryn Oliver of Transforming Evidence, an international community of researchers and policy makers sharing expertise about how evidence is made and used across different disciplines and sectors.

In May 2022 Boaz and Kathryn Oliver, London School of Hygiene and Tropical Medicine, provided written evidence to the UK Parliament Inquiry on Delivering a UK science and technology strategy.

== Awards and honours ==
In 2025 Annette Boaz became an NIHR Senior Investigator. NIHR Senior Investigators are research leaders who make a significant impact on health and care. They also make significant contributions to the work of the NIHR, acting as ambassadors and shaping research across social care, public health, and the NHS.

In October 2019 Boaz was elected as a Fellow of the Academy of Social Sciences.

== Published works ==
- What Works Now? Evidence-informed policy and practice(2019) Policy Press, edited by Annette Boaz, Huw Davies, Alec Fraser and Sandra Nutley.
- 'It depends': what 86 systematic reviews tell us about what strategies to use to support the use of research in clinical practice Implementation Science volume 19 (2024)
- If health organisations and staff engage in research, does healthcare improve? Strengthening the evidence base through systematic reviews Health Research Policy and Systems volume 22, Article number: 113 (2024)
- Are research-policy engagement activities informed by policy theory and evidence? 7 challenges to the UK impact agenda Policy Design and Practice, Volume 4, Issue 3 (2021)
- Does the diffusion of innovations model enrich understanding of research use? Case studies of the implementation of thrombolysis for stroke Journal of Health Services Research and Policy, 21 (4).
- Does the engagement of clinicians and organisations in research improve healthcare performance: a three stage review BMJ Open, 5 (12)
