= Ken Young =

British political scientist and historian (1943–2019)

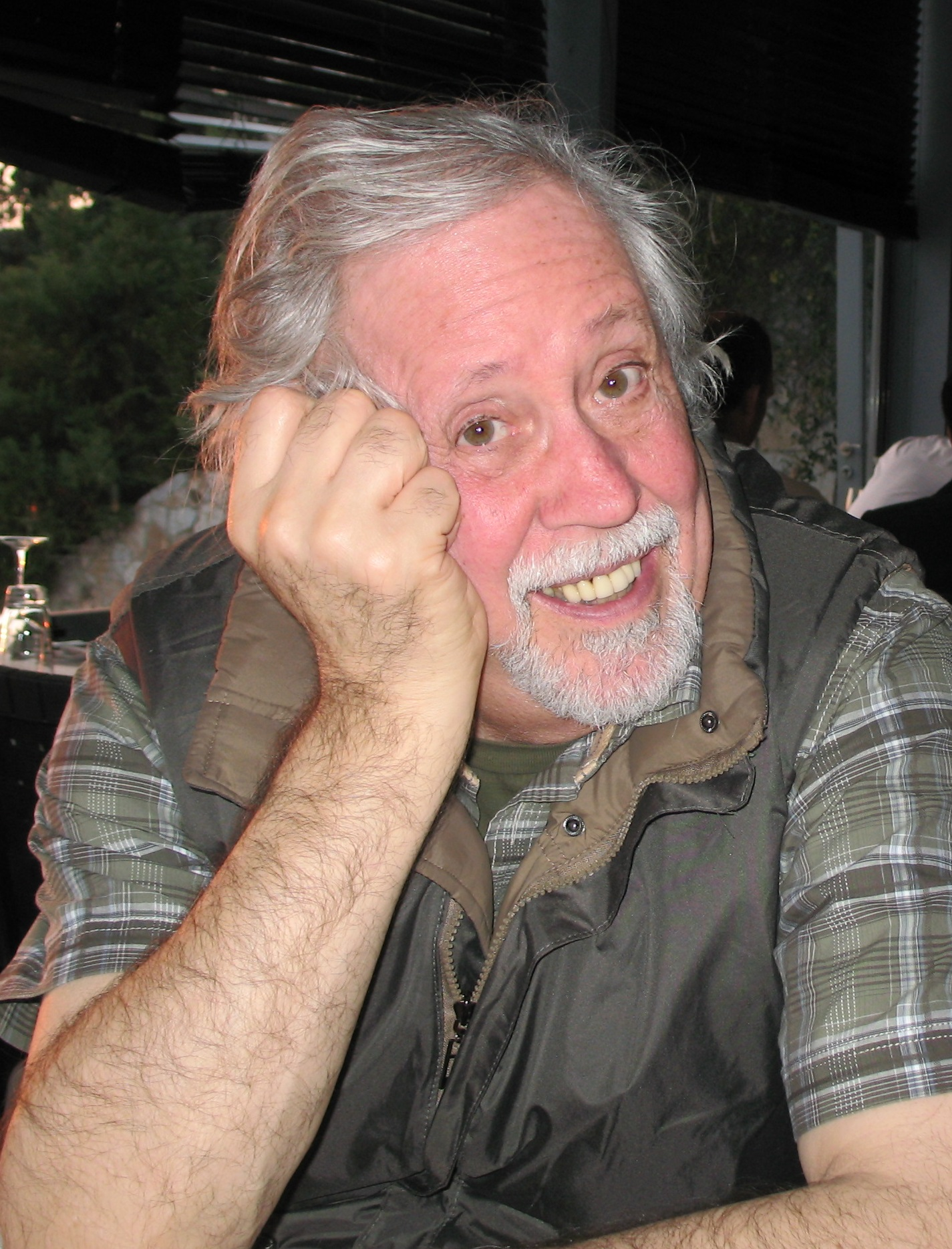
- Ken Young in 2013
- Born: 3 January 1943; Christchurch, Hampshire
- Died: 20 February 2019 (aged 76)
- Occupations: Historian and political scientist

Academic background
- Education: London School of Economics (BA, MA, PhD)
- Thesis: The London municipal society 1894–1963: a study in Conservatism and local government
- Doctoral advisor: George W. Jones

Academic work
- Institutions: King's College London; University of Bristol; University of Birmingham; University of Kent

Kenneth George Young FAcSS FRHistS (3 January 1943 – 20 February 2019) was a British political scientist and historian who was Professor of Public Policy at King's College London in its Department of War Studies. Earlier he was instrumental in the creation of the Department of Political Economy at KCL in 2010, and was its founding head of department.

Educated at the London School of Economics, Young was a research officer with the influential Greater London Group during his time there. Young taught at several institutions prior to coming to KCL, including the University of Kent at Canterbury; the University of Bristol, where he was a founding editor of the interdisciplinary-oriented journal Policy & Politics and where the annual Ken Young Best Paper Prize is named after him; the University of Birmingham, where he was director of the Institute of Local Government Studies; and at Queen Mary and Westfield College of the University of London, where he was head of the Department of Politics and Vice-Principal. Young is most known for his work in urban studies and policy studies, specially with regard to local government in England. He was also involved in the evidence-based policy movement, including serving as director of the Economic and Social Research Council's UK Centre for Evidence Based Policy and Practice and co-founding the journal Evidence & Policy.

He served on several governmental bodies, in particular being director of research for the Widdicombe Committee during 1985–86. Late in his career, he shifted his focus towards security studies and became a historian of the early Cold War. One of his journal articles in that field was awarded a Moncado Prize by the Society for Military History.

== Early life and education ==
Young was from Christchurch, Hampshire (now Dorset), born to a working-class family for whom education was not a priority. He left school at age 15, without any qualifications. After enlisting in the Royal Air Force, he was stationed at RAF Halton as an armament engineer, but back problems cut his service short. When he returned home, he obtained tutoring in several subjects by a local librarian, and was able to gain A-level qualifications.

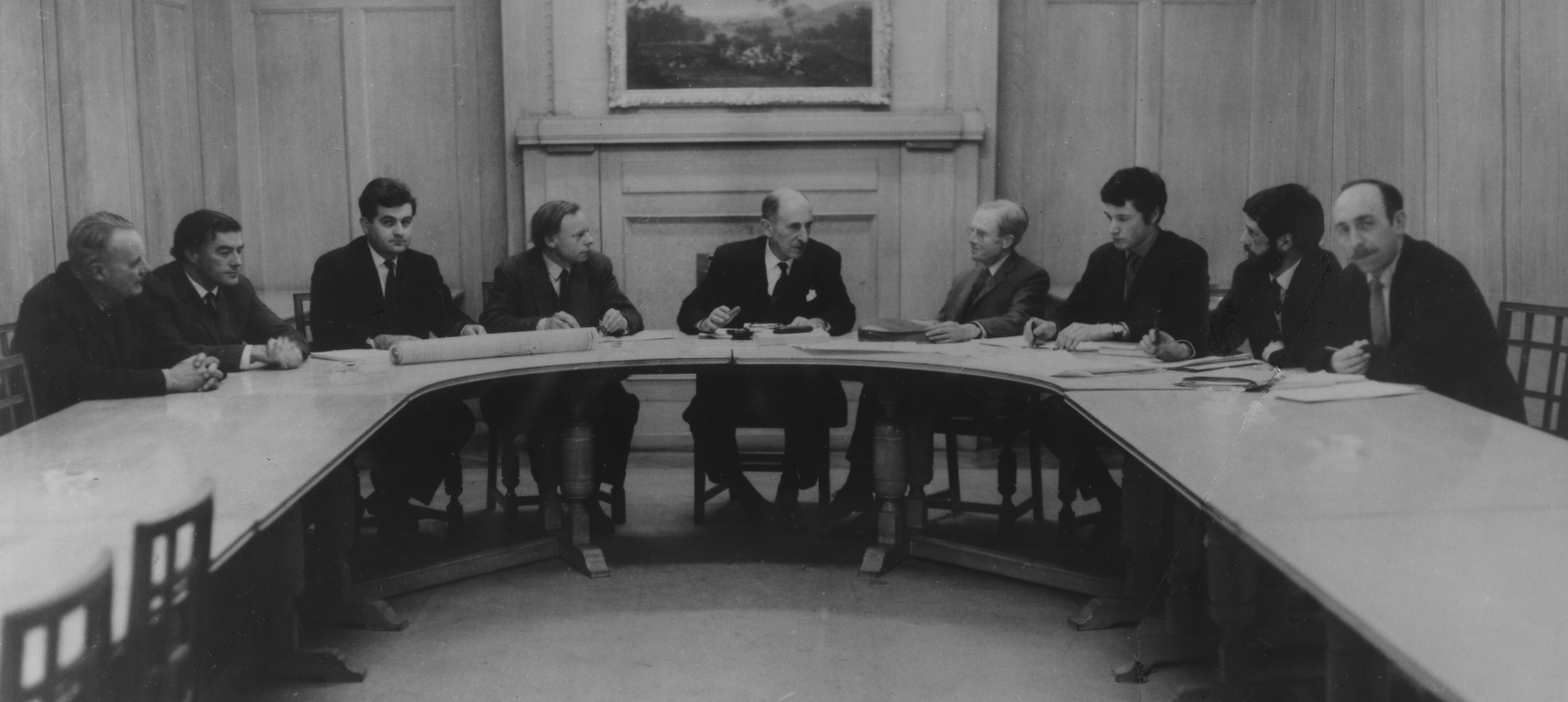
Young (second from right) with the Greater London Group in 1968

With those qualifications Young gained admission to the London School of Economics, from which he earned bachelor's and master's degrees.

While pursuing his doctoral studies, Young was a research officer with the Greater London Group, a research centre – led by William A. Robson – within LSE for the study of London government, in the late 1960s. One later history has used Young as an example of a researcher from the group who went on to "academic fame".

Young also taught in the sociology department at Goldsmiths' College before coming back to LSE and serving as a research officer with the Department of Government. He then completed his PhD thesis, entitled The London municipal society 1894–1963: a study in Conservatism and local government, under the supervision of George W. Jones, and was awarded his doctorate from LSE in 1974.

== Academic career in public policy ==
In 1974, Young became a research fellow at the University of Kent at Canterbury. In the same year he became co-editor with Bleddyn Davies of the academic journal Policy & Politics, which the two of them had been instrumental in forming two years earlier while at LSE. The goal of the journal was to provide an interdisciplinary approach to the study of local government. Young's networking skills were crucial in recruiting academics from around the world, including future Nobel Prize winner Elinor Ostrom, to publish articles for the new journal.

Young's first book, a revised version of his dissertation, was published as Local politics and the rise of party: the London municipal society and the conservative intervention in local elections, 1894-1963 by Leicester University Press in 1975.

By the late 1970s he had moved to the University of Bristol, where he was affiliated with that institution's School for Advanced Urban Studies. Under Young's guidance, Policy & Politics found a permanent home at Bristol, in what eventually became the Policy Press. He remained Managing Editor of the journal until 1980. Young also joined the Policy Studies Institute in 1980, where he was a senior fellow.

Young then became professor at the University of Birmingham in 1987, where he was also director of the Institute of Local Government Studies. Much of Young's research during the 1980s focused how local governments could realise equal opportunity policies. One such effort was a joint conference and study project with American sociologist Nathan Glazer, that sought to compare British and American approaches towards that goal. An evaluation in American Political Science Review of the resulting book of conference papers assessed the British contributions as superior to the American ones and criticised Glazer's portrayal of U.S. racial history in particular.

In 1990, Young was named as Professor of Politics and head of the Department of Politics at Queen Mary and Westfield College of the University of London. He was appointed Vice-Principal there in 1992, a position he held for six years. He was also involved in publicising research on authoritarianism to a general audience. Of his 1997 book Local Government since 1945, written with Nirmala Rao, one popular text included it in a bibliography as a "useful postwar review" of the subject.

In connection with the movement for evidence-based policy, from 2000 to 2005 Young was director of the Economic and Social Research Council's UK Centre for Evidence Based Policy and Practice. The centre was located at first within Queen Mary and then within King's College London. Additionally, Young was a founding editor in 2005 of Evidence & Policy, an interdisciplinary journal covering the relationship between research evidence and public policy.

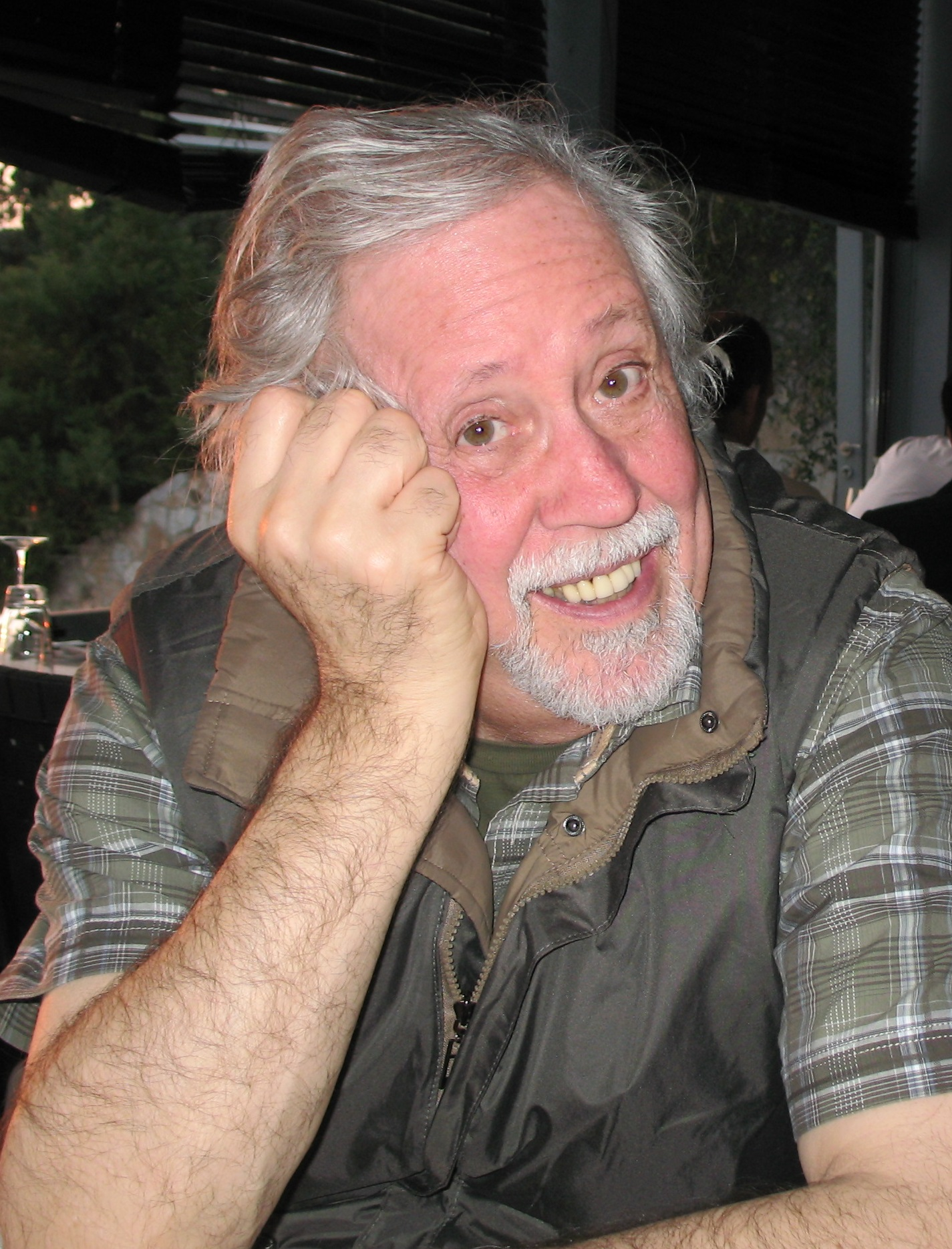
Ken Young in 2013

In 2005, Young himself went to KCL as Professor of Public Policy. His charge was to bring into being postgraduate programmes in public policy, which included establishment of a master's in the subject as well as the creation of the Institute for the Study of Public Policy. That institute eventually transformed into the Department of Political Economy in 2010; Young remained its head until January 2013.

Young was known for his teaching, which he did over a span of 50 years. He did not focus his attentions so much on superior students, but rather sought to assist and engage those who were struggling for one reason or another.

Young was on the staff of the University of Bolton's Centre for Opposition Studies.

Young's work in public policy has been influential and frequently cited. Policy & Politics journal awards an annual Ken Young Best Paper Prize, in recognition of Young's "innovative ideas and determination to put interdisciplinary analysis of and for policy firmly on the academic map in the UK and beyond." The bibliography of Gerry Stoker's 1991 textbook The Politics of Local Government has ten separate listings for Young's books, articles, and reports. The 2002 journal article "Social science and the evidence-based policy movement", of which Young was the lead author and which sought to address the problem that "there remains some confusion about what evidence-based policy making actually means", has been cited over 325 times. Young's narrative histories have also been praised as very readable.

Upon his death, a KCL notice said that Young "understood that institutions embody ideas and may be our most enduring legacy. The Department of Political Economy at King's College London embodied Ken's belief in the value of interdisciplinary scholarship dedicated to the study of public policy and is an important part of his legacy." Bleddyn Davies wrote that Young had a "gift for getting to the right place at the right time", and that this was a key factor in Young's effectiveness in a new and growing field.

== Government-related positions ==
Young had positions related to public affairs on a number of occasions. He served as Specialist Advisor to the House of Commons Select Committee on Environment in 1982–83.

Young then served as director of research to the Committee of Inquiry into the Conduct of Local Authority Business, known as the Widdicombe Committee, during 1985–86. As director, Young made the case for local government, as opposed to centralisation, being better able to innovate, maximise the value of public choice, and lead to public participation and pluralism. While not all agreed with the conclusions of the Widdicombe Committee's report, City of Westminster chief executive Rodney Brooke wrote that it "present[s] the most extensive and authoritative examination of the internal workings of local government for two decades." Brooke also stated that Young's essay in the report was a "fascinating" piece. Others too have praised the level and quality of research that went into the Widdicombe Report.

In a follow-on report done in 1990 for the Joseph Rowntree Foundation to examine changes in municipal government since Widdicombe, Young and his colleague Mary Davies found that local councils were putting adherence to partisan politics ahead of the interests of the general public. In further work done for the Rowntree Foundation during 1993–94, Young and Rao explored the dissatisfactions of local councillors who were frustrated by slow, cumbersome processes overly influenced by party politics and leading to them departing office, and the slow rate at which the percentage of women who were councillors was increasing.

Young was a Commissioner of the Local Government Boundary Commission between 1990 and 1992.

== Cold War historian ==
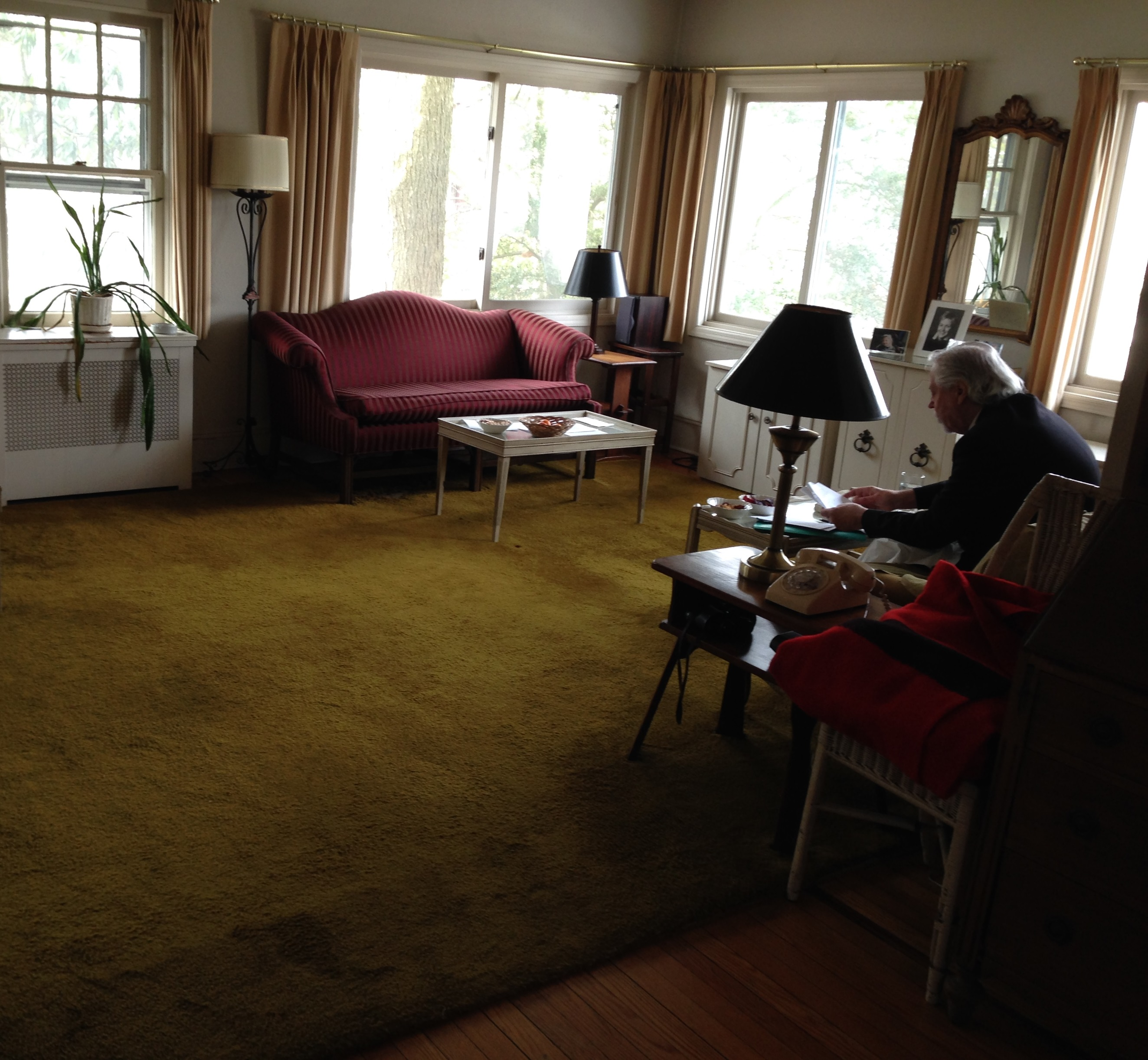
Young in the United States in 2014, examining the interview notes that would become a basis for his subsequent book Super Bomb

Beginning in the 2000s, Young began researching and writing in a different area, what he termed "the politics of defence in the early Cold War", with articles in The Journal of Military History, the Journal of Cold War Studies, and similar academic publications.

The first such article was "The Royal Navy's Polaris lobby, 1955–62", published in the Journal of Strategic Studies in 2002 while he was still at Queen Mary. It concerned the United Kingdom's Polaris programme, and through archival research showed that contrary to past interpretations, the Admiralty had actively sought a submarine-launched ballistic missile capability and the deterrent role that went along with it and that the programme represented "a naval triumph in terms of Whitehall politics and inter-service competition." Many of his other articles also focused on the British role in nuclear deployments during the early Cold War period, and the evolution of the British independent nuclear deterrent.

Several of the themes of this research were encapsulated in Young's 2016 book The American Bomb in Britain: US Air Forces' Strategic Presence, 1946–64, which provided both an operational and a political history of the Strategic Air Command in the United Kingdom.

Young died in February 2019.

His final book was published posthumously in February 2020 (copyright date 2019): Super Bomb: Organizational Conflict and the Development of the Hydrogen Bomb concerned the decision by the US government to proceed with development of the hydrogen bomb and the ramifications of that decision for several years after. Young's work made use of extensive, previously unused interviews with virtually all the major participants in the decision conducted in the mid-1950s by Columbia University professor Warner R. Schilling. A review in Foreign Affairs characterized Young's effort as having produced "a compelling book" that presented "a fresh look at the defeat" of those opposing the weapon, while a review for the Association of College and Research Libraries assessed the book as being "well written, cogently argued, and deeply researched."

== Awards and honors ==
Young was elected to the Fellowship of the Royal Historical Society. He was also a Fellow of the Academy of Social Sciences.

In 2014, Policy & Politics journal began awarding an annual Ken Young Best Paper Prize, given to one article published in the previous year's volume that was most "judged to represent excellence in the field".

Young's article "Special Weapon, Special Relationship: The Atomic Bomb Comes to Britain", published in The Journal of Military History, was awarded a 2014 Moncado Prize by the Society for Military History.

== Published works ==
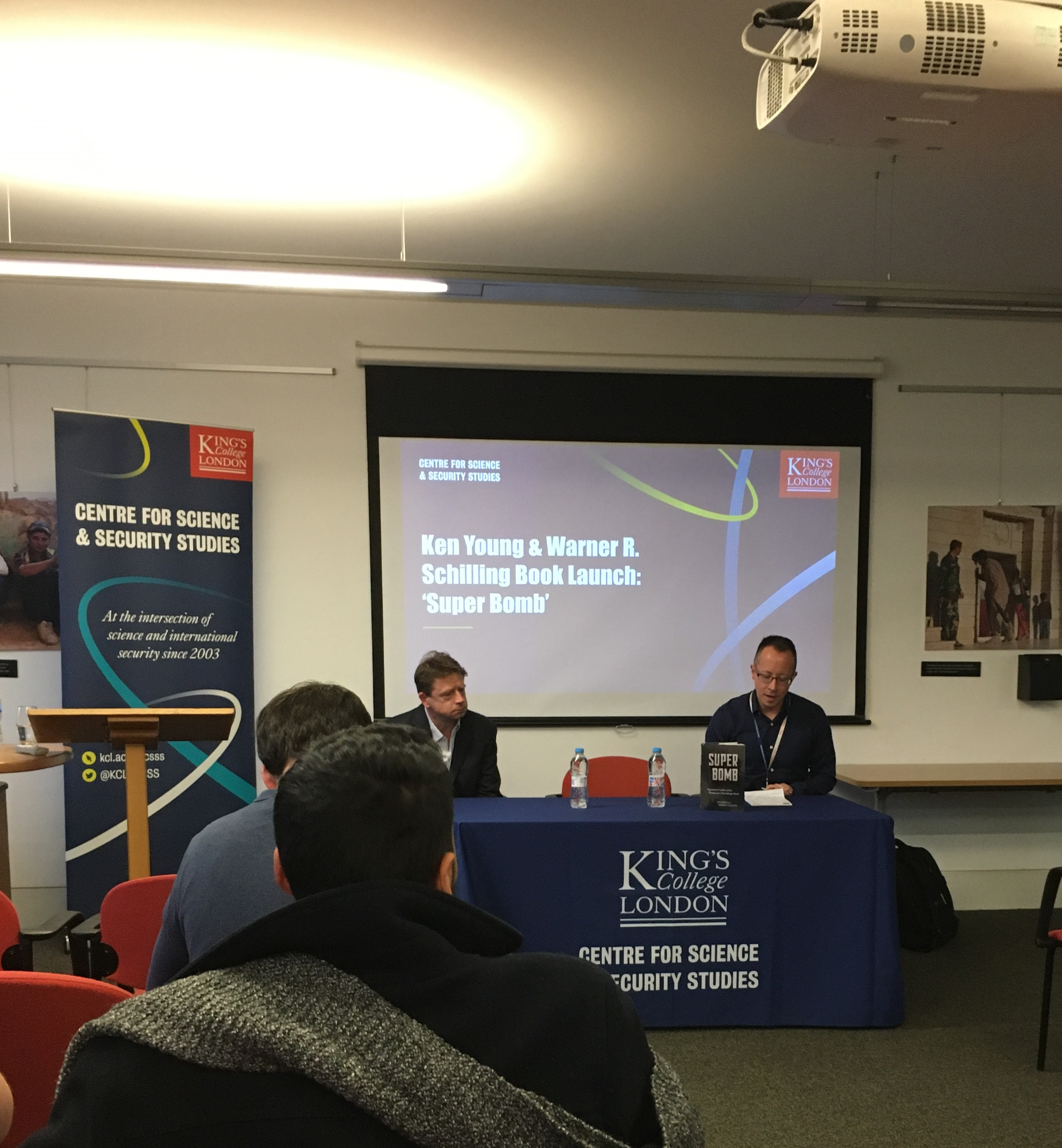
Launch event for Super Bomb at the Centre for Science & Security Studies, King's College London, 2020

=== Books ===
- Local politics and the rise of party: The London municipal society and the conservative intervention in local elections, 1894–1963 (Leicester University Press, 1975)
- Essays on the Study of Urban Politics (Springer, 1975) [editor]
- Strategy and conflict in metropolitan housing: Suburbia versus the Greater London Council, 1965–75 (Heinemann, 1978) [co-author with John Kramer]
- Policy and Practice in the Multi-Racial City (Policy Studies Institute, 1981) [co-author with Naomi Connelly]
- Metropolitan London: Politics and Urban Change 1837–1981 (Edward Arnold, 1982) [co-author with Patricia L. Garside]
- Ethnic Pluralism and Public Policy: Achieving Equality in the United States and Britain (Heinemann, D. C. Heath, 1983) [co-editor with Nathan Glazer]
- Managing the Post-Industrial City (Heinemann, 1983) [co-author with Liz Mills]
- National Interests and Local Government (Ashgate, 1983) [editor]
- Urban economic development: New roles and relationships (Macmillan, 1983) [co-editor with Charlie Mason]
- The London Employment Problem (Clarendon Press, 1986) [co-author with Nick Buck and Ian Gordon]
- Abolition: the reform of metropolitan government in England 1983–86; a review and bibliography (Letchworth: Technical Communications, 1987) [co-author with Lesley Grayson]
- Creating a Responsive Public Service (Harvester Wheatsheaf, 1990) [co-author with Roger Hadley]
- Local Government since 1945 (Blackwell Publishing, 1997) [co-author with Nirmala Rao]
- The American Bomb in Britain: US Air Forces' Strategic Presence, 1946–64 (Manchester University Press, 2016)
- Super Bomb: Organizational Conflict and the Development of the Hydrogen Bomb (Cornell University Press, 2019) [co-author with Warner R. Schilling]

=== Selected articles, chapters, and reports ===
- "Lessons of the London government reforms" (Greater London Group, 1968)
- "'Values' in the Policy Process", Policy & Politics Vol. 5, No. 3 (1977)
- "Public policy research: a review of qualitative methods (Social Science Research Council, 1980) [co-author with Liz Mills]
- "Urban governments and economic change" (Social Science Research Council, 1980) [co-author with Charles Mason and Liz Mills]
- "Ethnic record keeping in local authorities: a discussion paper" (Policy Studies Institute, 1981) [co-author with Naomi Connelly]
- "Widdicombe from the researcher's angle", Local Government Studies Vol. 12, No. 6 (1986)
- "The management of doctoral studies in the social sciences" (Policy Studies Institute, 1987) [co-author with Michael Patrick Fogarty and Susan McRae]
- "The politics of local government since Widdicombe" (Joseph Rowntree Foundation, 1990) [co-author with Mary Davies]
- "Future of county government" (Policy Studies Institute, 1990)
- "Approaches to Policy Development in the Field of Equal Opportunities", in Wendy Ball and John Solomos (eds.) Race and Local Politics (Palgrave Macmillan, 1990)
- "Breaking down the barriers: Women Managers in Local Government" (Local Government Management Board, 1991) [co-author with Liz Spencer]
- "Coming to terms with change? The local government councillor in 1993" (Joseph Rowntree Foundation, 1994) [co-author with Nirmala Rao]
- "Reinventing Local Government? Some Evidence Assessed", Public Administration Vol. 74, No. 3 (1996)
- "Social Science and the Evidence-based Policy Movement", Social Policy and Society Vol. 1, No. 3 (2002) [co-author with Deborah Ashby, Annette Boaz, and Lesley Grayson]
- "The Royal Navy's Polaris lobby, 1955–62", Journal of Strategic Studies Vol. 25, No. 3 (2002)
- "US 'atomic capability' and the British forward bases in the early Cold War", Journal of Contemporary History Vol. 42, No. 1 (2007)
- "Special Weapon, Special Relationship: The Atomic Bomb Comes to Britain", Journal of Military History Vol. 77, No. 2 (2013)
- "Revisiting NSC-68", Journal of Cold War Studies Vol. 15, No. 1 (2013)
- "The Hydrogen Bomb, Lewis L. Strauss and the Writing of Nuclear History", Journal of Strategic Studies Vol. 36, No. 6 (2013)
- "Cold War Insecurities, and the Curious Case of John Strachey", Intelligence and National Security, Vol. 29, No. 6 (2014)
