= RUSD =

RUSD may refer to:

== United States school districts ==
- Racine Unified School District, in Racine County, Wisconsin.
- Ramona Unified School District, in San Diego County, California.
- Redlands Unified School District, in San Bernardino County, California.
- Reed Union School District, in Marin County, California.
- Rialto Unified School District, in San Bernardino County, California.
- Riverside Unified School District, in Riverside County, California.
- Rocklin Unified School District, in Placer County, California.
- Rowland Unified School District, in Los Angeles County, California.

== Other ==
- RUSD Investment Bank, based in Malaysia (see List of banks in Malaysia).
