= Tony Travers =

British academic and journalist (born 1953)

Antony Justin Travers CBE (born December 1953) is a British academic and journalist, based at the London School of Economics (LSE), specialising in issues affecting local government. He was formerly director of the Greater London Group, a research centre at LSE for the study of the government of London. Since 1998, Travers has been Director of LSE London, a research group that evolved out of the Greater London Group, which is hosted by the Department of Geography and Environment of the London School of Economics and conducts research on the economic and social issues of the London region.

He contributes a regular column to the Local Government Chronicle and has also written for The Guardian, The Evening Standard, The Independent, the Financial Times and The Times. He has published a number of books on cities and government.

Travers has held a number of official posts. From 1992 to 1997, he was a member of the Audit Commission and, between 1999 and 2004, he was a Senior Associate of the King's Fund. He has advised the House of Commons Education and Skills Select Committee and the Committee on the Office of the Deputy Prime Minister and is a member of the Chartered Institute of Public Finance and Accountancy. He was also a member of the Urban Task Force Working Group on Finance.

He was appointed a Commander of the Order of the British Empire (CBE) in the 2026 New Year Honours for public service.

== Selected publications ==
- (with David Butler and Andrew Adonis) Failure in British Government: The Politics of the Poll Tax, Oxford University Press, 1994. ISBN 9780198278757
- (with Howard Glennerster and John Hills) Paying for Health, Education and Housing: How does the Centre Pull the Purse Strings Oxford University Press, 2000. ISBN 9780199240784
- The Politics of London: Governing an Ungovernable City, Red Globe Press, 2003. ISBN 9780333961001
- London's Boroughs at 50, Biteback Publishing, 2015. ISBN 9781849549196
