= Juliette Alvin =

Alvin in 1950.

Juliette Louise Alvin (1897 – 30 September 1982) was a French-British cellist, viola da gamba player, and pioneering music therapist.

== Biography ==
She was born in Limoges, France, and studied at the Conservatoire de Paris, where she was awarded the Premier Prix d'Excellence and the Mèdaille d'Or. She studied under a master class arrangement with Pablo Casals. Her debut recital took place in 1927 at London's Wigmore Hall.

She married William A. Robson, a British academic who became an early and influential scholar of public administration at the London School of Economics, in the year 1929. In that same year she became a British citizen. The couple had three children.

She founded the Society of Music Therapy and Remedial Music in 1958, (later renamed the British Society for Music Therapy), and, in 1967, initiated Britain's first music therapy training program at the Guildhall School of Music and Drama in London.

She also promoted music therapy around the world. Alvin visited Japan in 1967 and 1969, sharing theory and practice with Japanese music therapy pioneers.

== Publications ==
Alvin authored several books, including Music Therapy for the Handicapped Child in 1965, Music Therapy in 1966, and Music for the Autistic Child in 1978.
