= Evidence & Policy =

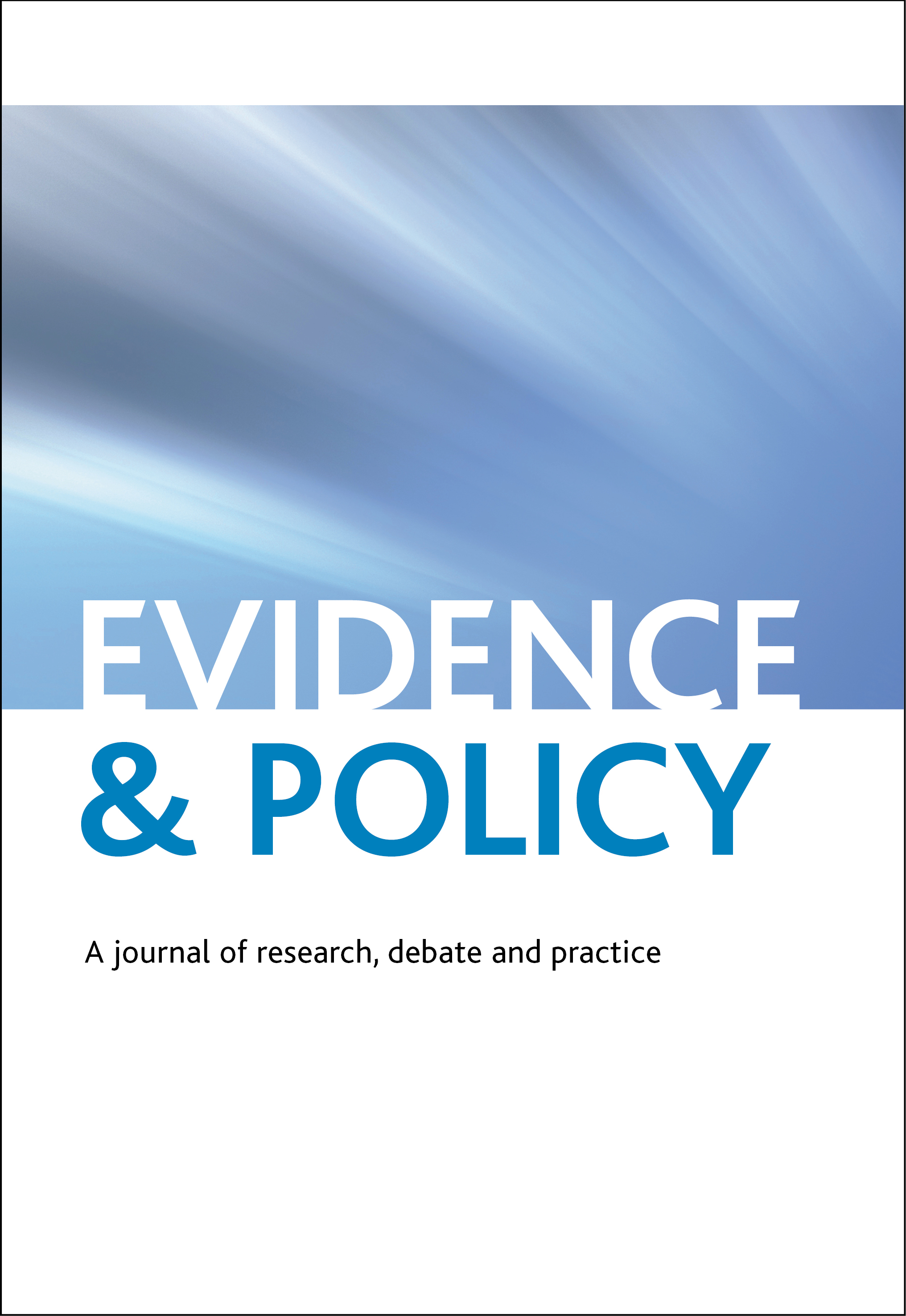
- Discipline: Public policy
- Language: English
- Edited by: Mariah Kornblush, Daniel Mallinson

Publication details
- History: 2005–present
- Publisher: Policy Press
- Frequency: Quarterly
- Open access: Hybrid
- Impact factor: 1.836 (2020)

Standard abbreviations
- ISO 4: Evid. Policy

Indexing
- ISSN: 1744-2648 (print); 1744-2656 (web)
- LCCN: 2005236147
- OCLC no.: 877592323

Links
- Journal homepage; Online archive

Evidence & Policy: A Journal of Research, Debate & Practice is a quarterly peer-reviewed academic journal covering the relationship between research evidence and public policy. It was established in 2005 and is published by Policy Press. The founding editors-in-chief were Ken Young and Annette Boaz. The current editors-in-chief are Mariah Kornblush and Daniel Mallinson.

== Abstracting and indexing ==
The journal is abstracted and indexed in Current Contents/Social and Behavioral Sciences, International Bibliography of the Social Sciences, Scopus, and the Social Sciences Citation Index. According to the Journal Citation Reports, the journal has a 2020 impact factor of 1.836, ranking it 62nd out of 109 journals in the category "Social Science, Interdisciplinary".

== Editors-in-chief ==
The following persons are or have been editors-in-chief:

- Ken Young (2005–2008)
- Annette Boaz (2005–2017)
- David Gough (2008–2017)
- Katherine Smith (2018–2021)
- Mark Pearson (2018–2021)
- Zachary P. Neal (2022–2025)
- Caroline Oliver (2022–2025)
- Mariah Kornblush (2025–present)
- Daniel J. Mallinson (2025–present)

== Special issues ==
In each volume year, the journal publishes a special issue organized by guest editors addressing a specific topic. Recent special issues have included:

- The many faces of disability in evidence for policy and practice. Guest edited by Carol Rivas, Ikuko Tomomatsu and David Gough (Volume 17, Number 2, May 2021)
- Opening up evidence-based policy: exploring citizen and service user expertise. Guest edited by Ellen Stewart, Jennifer Smith-Merry and Marc Geddes (Volume 16, Number 2, May 2020)
- Co-creative approaches to knowledge production and implementation. Guest edited by Allison Metz, Annette Boaz and Glenn Robert (Volume 15, Number 3, August 2019)
- Networks and network analysis in evidence, policy and practice. Guest-edited by Kathryn Oliver and Moira Faul (Volume 14, Number 3, August 2018)

== Carol Weiss Prize ==
In 2016 the journal created the Carol Weiss Prize to recognize outstanding early career contributors to the journal. The author of the winning article receives £100 in books from Policy Press, and the winning article is made open access for three months. Past winners have included:

- In 2016: Allen, William L. (19 May 2017). "Factors that impact how civil society intermediaries perceive evidence". Evidence & Policy. 13 (2): 183–200. doi:10.1332/17442646X14538259555968.
- In 2017: Stucki, Iris (18 November 2016). "The use of evidence in public debates in the media: the case of Swiss direct-democratic campaigns in the health policy sector". Evidence & Policy. 12 (4): 487–504. doi:10.1332/174426415X14375563594446.
- In 2019: Mills, Kristen J.; Lawlor, Jennifer A.; Neal, Jennifer Watling; Neal, Zachary P.; McAlindon, Kathryn (1 August 2020). "What is research? Educators' conceptions and alignment with United States federal policies". Evidence & Policy. 16 (3): 337–358. doi:10.1332/174426419X15468576296175. PMC 8570567. PMID 34745313.
- In 2021 (co-winner): Bandola-Gill, Justyna (1 November 2021). "The legitimacy of experts in policy: navigating technocratic and political accountability in the case of global poverty governance". Evidence & Policy. 17 (4): 615–633. doi:10.1332/174426420X16000980489195. hdl:20.500.11820/b9267d55-0692-4eed-85b5-1661f1d35a93. S2CID 226514632.
- In 2021 (co-winner): Chew, Sarah; Armstrong, Natalie; Martin, Graham P. (1 February 2022). "Understanding knowledge brokerage and its transformative potential: a Bourdieusian perspective". Evidence & Policy. 18 (1): 25–42. doi:10.1332/174426421X16149632470114. S2CID 234160376.
