= Diane Stone =

Australian-British academic (born 1964)

Diane L. Stone FASSA (born April 1964) is an Australian-British academic. Her research and publication addresses the influence of ideas and expertise on policy, the political economy of higher education; the ‘new diplomacy’; policy networks; international philanthropy; think tanks and global governance.

== Career ==
Diane Stone was a founding vice president of the International Public Policy Association for 8 years until June 2022. She is Professor of Global Policy at the European University Institute in the Florence School of Transnational Governance. Until 2019, she worked at the University of Warwick for 23 years.

Stone was Foundation Professor of Public Policy at Central European University (CEU) in Budapest in 2004, thereafter remaining as Visiting Professor from 2008. From 2019 she became full time Dean to oversee the transition of the School of Public Policy to Vienna.

In 2012, she became a fellow of the Academy of the Social Sciences in Australia. Stone was also one of a handful of Centenary Professors at the University of Canberra where she was based in the now closed Institute for Governance and Policy Analysis.

During 1999, Stone worked at the World Bank Institute as a member of the Secretariat that launched the Global Development Network. She was an editor of Global Governance: A Review of Multilateralism and International Organizations. Until 2020, she was Consulting Editor with Policy & Politics.

Stone's research and publication has focused on the influence of ideas and expertise in policy making, and especially the impact of think tanks. Other work has focused on policy networks. especially networks sponsored by the World Bank. Recent scholarship addresses the dynamics of global policy making and transnational administration as well as processes of policy translation.

At CEU, her research addressed international organisation influences on the transition countries of Central Europe. She also researched international philanthropy in higher education, including that of the Open Society Foundations.

At Warwick, research and publication addressed the new diplomacy in science, culture and diaspora. Stone was a research leader in the European Commission's EL-CSID consortium on European Leadership in Cultural, Science and Innovation Diplomacy.

== Selected publications ==
- ‘Transnational Policy Transfer: Ideas, Power, and Development’, special issue guest edited with Leslie A. Pal and Osmany Porto de Oliveira, Policy & Society. 2020.
- Making Global Policy, Cambridge University Press, December 2019
- Oxford Handbook of Global Policy and Transnational Administration, with K. Moloney, Oxford University Press, 2019.
- Policy Experiments, Failures and Innovations: Beyond Accession in Central and Eastern Europe, with A. Batory and A. Cartwright, Edward Elgar, 2018.
- Knowledge Actors and Transnational Governance: The Public-Private Policy Nexus in the Global Agora Palgrave MacMillan, 2013.
- The World Bank and Governance: A Decade of Reform and Reaction, with C. Wright, Routledge, 2006.
- Global Knowledge Networks and International Development: Bridges Across Boundaries, with S. Maxwell, Routledge, 2005
- Think Tank Traditions: Policy Research and the Politics of Ideas, with A. Denham (Manchester, Manchester University Press, 2004).
- Banking on Knowledge: The Genesis of the Global Development Network, London, Routledge, 2000.
- Think Tanks Across Nations: A Comparative Approach (Manchester, Manchester University Press, 1998.
- Capturing the Political Imagination: Think Tanks and the Policy Process, London: Frank Cass, 1996.
