= Tom Hatherley Pear =

American psychologist (1886–1972)

Professor Tom Hatherley Pear
- Born: 22 March 1886; Walpole, Norfolk
- Died: 14 May 1972 (aged 86)
- Occupation: Psychologist
- Spouse: Catherine
- Children: 4, including: Richard Pear

Tom Hatherley Pear (22 March 1886 – 14 May 1972) was a British psychologist who was the first professor of psychology in England and served as president of the British Psychological Society.

== Biography ==
Tom Hatherley Pear was born in Walpole, Norfolk, 22 March 1886 the oldest son of Alfred John and Mary Ann Pear. He undertook tertiary education and gained an M.A and B.Sc.

== Career ==
Pear became Professor of Psychology in the University of Manchester, Fellow of King's College London and president of the British Psychological Society. He was the author of several books on psychology including studies of human conversation, and the development of memory and skills. He was also Secretary of the Manchester Literary and Philosophical Society from 1920 to 1924.

Pear was actively involved in the system of assisting refugees and the family home became a safe house during the Kindertransport. Many of those who passed through on their way to the US or who stayed in the UK became long term family friends. A professor from Utrecht was found a lecturing post at Manchester University, before he too went to the US.

During WWI Pear, who had just returned from studying in Würzburg, became a Conscientious Objector, and served at Maghull Hospital, examining and then treating what was then known as 'Shell Shock', then 'Battle Psychosis', and is now acknowledged as PTSD. He was in regular correspondence with, and visited W. H. R. Rivers at Craiglockhart War Hospital in Edinburgh, where Siegfried Sassoon and Wilfred Owen were patients.

In 1917 Pear and co-author the Australian-born anatomist Grafton Elliot Smith show had worked with Ronald Rows at Maghull Military Hospital, proposed in Shell-Shock and its Lessons the idea that ordinary people could benefit from techniques used in treating the soldiers: 'If the lessons of war are to be truly beneficial, much more extensive application must be made of these methods, not only for our soldiers now, but also for our civilian population for all time.'

== Personal life ==
Pear was married to Catherine, who had a special interest in working-class housing in Manchester where they lived with their young family They had two daughters and two sons; Richard, born 1916, political scientist and Professor of American Politics at Nottingham University; and Brian, who was killed in the Second World War when as a flail tank commander, he led the attack on his sector of the beach on D-Day and was killed in action later that year on the Meuse, when he interposed his tank between a damaged one and enemy fire to permit the crew of the former to escape. Daughters were Marjorie who was a very talented pianist and harpsichord player and married a barrister who rose to High Court Judge, and Stella, who married a GP, and served for several decades as a Magistrate on the Bench Adult and Juvenile, in Grimsby and latterly in Bradford.

Prof. Emeritus Pear died on 14 May 1972.

== Publications ==
=== Books ===
- Grafton Elliot Smith; Pear, Tom Hatherley, 1886- (1917), Shell shock and its lessons (2d ed.), Manchester University Press
- Pear, T. H (1924), Skill in work and play, New York, E.P. Button & co
- Pear, T. H (1928), Fitness for work, University of London Press
- Pear, T. H (1930), The art of study, Kegan Paul, Trench, Trubner
- Pear, T. H. (1931). Voice and personality as applied to radio broadcasting. New York: John Wiley & Sons.
- Pear, T. H (1933), The psychology of effective speaking, K. Paul, Trench, Trubner & co. ltd
- Pear, T. H. (1935). Mental imagery and style in writing. Place of publication not identified.
- Pear, T. H., & John Rylands Library, Manchester. (1937). The place of imagery in mental processes. Manchester: Manchester University Press.
- Pear, T. H (1938), The maturing mind, Thomas Nelson and Sons
- Pear, T. H (1939), The psychology of conversation, T. Nelson and Sons Ltd
- Pear, T. H. (1948). The Relations between Psychology and Sociology ... Reprinted from the "Bulletin of the John Rylands Library," etc. Manchester.
- Pear, T. H; Pear, T. H; United Nations Association of Great Britain and Northern Ireland (1950), Psychological factors of peace and war, Published on behalf of the United Nations Association by Hutchinson

=== Articles ===
- Pear, T. H. (January 1, 1942) 'Are there human instincts?' Bulletin of the John Rylands Library, 27, 137-167.
- Pear, T. H. (January 1, 1938) 'The modern study of personality,' Bulletin of the John Rylands Library, 22, 517-538.
- Pear, T. H. (January 1, 1944) 'The concept of mental maturity. Bulletin of the John Rylands Library, 28, 404-421.
- Pear, T. H. (January 1, 1942) 'Psychoanalysis and normal psychology,' Bulletin of the John Rylands Library, 26, 158-182.
- Pear, T. H. (January 1, 1942) 'Psychological aspects of English social stratification,' Bulletin of the John Rylands Library, 26, 342-368.
- Pear, T. H. (January 1, 1945) 'Psychological implications of the culture-pattern theory,' Bulletin of the John Rylands Library, 29, 201-224.
- Pear, T. H. (January 1, 1946) 'Personality in its cultural context,' Bulletin of the John Rylands Library, 30, 71-90.
- Pear, T. H. (January 1, 1948) 'The relations between psychology and sociology,' Bulletin of the John Rylands Library, 31, 277-294.
- Pear, T. H. (January 1, 1948) 'Peace, war and culture-patterns,' Bulletin of the John Rylands Library, 31, 120-147.

=== Lectures and broadcasts ===
- Pear, T. H., & British Broadcasting Corporation. (1930). 'Making work worth while'. London: British Broadcasting Corp.
- Pear, T. H. (1937) transcription of 'Religion and contemporary psychology,' delivered before the University of Durham at Armstrong college, Newcastle-upon-Tyne, in November 1936. London: Oxford University Press, H. Milford.

Professional and academic associations
Preceded by Sir Cyril Lodowic Burt	President of the British Psychological Society; 1943–44	Succeeded by Sir Millais Culpin
Preceded by Hubert Frank Coward	Secretary of the Manchester Literary and Philosophical Society; 1920–24	Succeeded by William Henry Lang
