= List of political parties in London =

Various political parties and organisations have elected representation in London's local government. This list includes the parties contesting elections to the thirty-two London borough councils and the City of London Corporation. London borough councillors were elected most recently in the 2022 London local elections, whereas the London Assembly was elected in the 2024 London Assembly election and MPs were elected in the 2024 general election.

== National parties ==
As of May 2026, political parties that contest elections nationally and throughout London.

Party	Political position	Ideology	House of Commons (Note: UK parliament seats in London.)	London Assembly	Council control	Councillors (Note: Councillors on the thirty-two London borough councils and the City of London Corporation.)
London Labour	Centre-left	Social democracy	58 / 75	11 / 25	10 / 32	703 / 1,942
London Conservatives	Centre-right to right-wing	Conservatism; Economic liberalism British unionism	8 / 75	7 / 25	7 / 32	407 / 1,942
London Green Party	Left-wing	Green politics Progressivism	0 / 75	3 / 25	3 / 32	294 / 1,942
London Liberal Democrats	Centre to centre-left	Liberalism; Social liberalism	6 / 75	2 / 25	3 / 32	243 / 1,942
Reform UK	Right-wing	Right-wing populism Euroscepticism	1 / 75	2 / 25	1 / 32	79 / 1,942

== Local parties ==
As of May 2026, political parties that contest elections in parts of London.

Party	Area active	Political position	Ideology	House of Commons (Note: UK parliament seats in London.)	London Assembly	Council control	Councillors (Note: Seats held on the council where elections are contested by the party.)
Arise	Harrow	Left-wing	Socialist	0 / 75	0 / 25	0 / 32	1 / 55
Aspire	Tower Hamlets	Left-wing	Populism: Democratic socialism; Localism	0 / 75	0 / 25	1 / 32	33 / 45
Chislehurst Matters	Chislehurst	Big tent	Localism	0 / 75	0 / 25	0 / 32	3 / 58
Harold Wood Hill Park Residents Association	Havering	Big tent	Localism	0 / 75	0 / 25	0 / 32	3 / 55
Havering Residents Association	Havering	Big tent	Localism	0 / 75	0 / 25	0 / 32	11 / 55
Kingston Independent Residents	Kingston upon Thames	Big tent	Localism	0 / 75	0 / 25	0 / 32	2 / 48
Merton Park Residents	Merton Park	Big tent	Localism	0 / 75	0 / 25	0 / 32	2 / 57
Newham Independents	Newham	Big tent	Localism	0 / 75	0 / 25	0 / 32	24 / 66
Redbridge Independents	Redbridge	Big tent	Localism	0 / 75	0 / 25	0 / 32	9 / 66
Temple and Farringdon Together	Farringdon Without	Big tent	Localism	0 / 75	0 / 25	0 / 32	11 / 125
