= Derek Diamond =

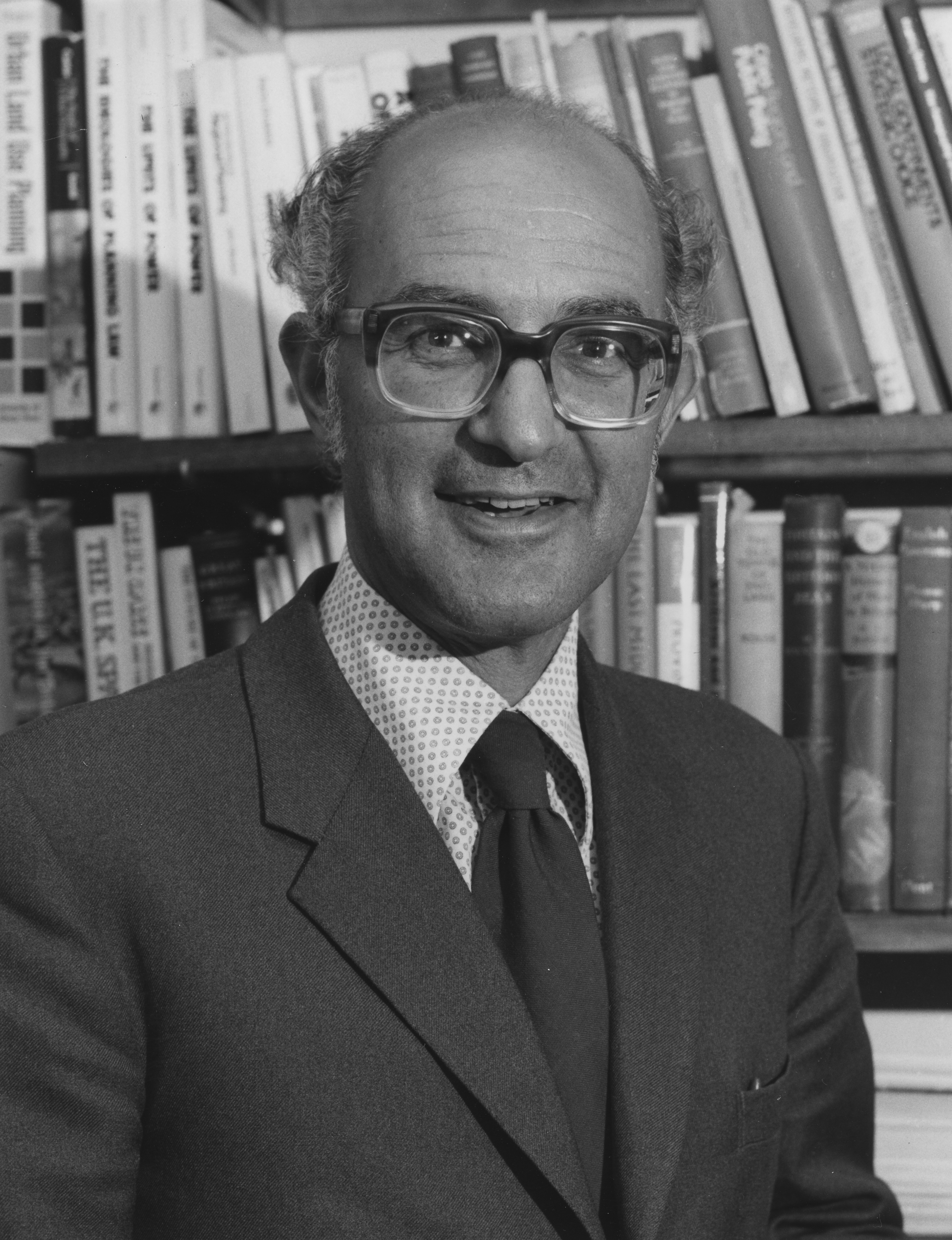
Derek Diamond

Derek Robin Diamond (1933–2015) was an applied geographer and academic. He was professor of geography at the London School of Economics between 1982 and 1995, and was a specialist in urban and regional planning.

== Early life and education ==
Diamond was born on 18 May 1933, the son of the Labour Party politician Jack Diamond, Baron Diamond, and his wife Sadie. He studied geography at Pembroke College, Oxford, graduating in 1955; he then completed a Master of Science degree at Northwestern University, which was awarded in 1957.

== Career ==
In 1957, he began teaching at the University of Glasgow as a lecturer in geography; in 1965, he was appointed to a lectureship in town and regional planning. He then arrived at the London School of Economics in 1968 as Reader in Geography, and remained at the LSE for the rest of his career, being promoted in 1982 to Professor of Geography. On arrival, he was put in charge of the urban and regional planning programme and directed the master's degree and doctorate in planning courses up to 1979. He was also Director of the Greater London Group between 1980 and 1995, and Convener of the Department of Geography between 1983 and 1987 and again between 1990 and 1992; he was Vice-Chairman of the Academic Board from 1988 and 1993 and was the Interim Director of the newly established Gender Institute for the 1993–94 academic year.

Diamond was also Chairman of the Regional Studies Association between 1974 and 1976, President of the Institute of British Geographers for the year 1994–95, and a vice-president of the Town and Country Planning Association. He was editor of the journals Town and Country Planning (1972 to 1981), Progress in Planning (from 1973 to 2003) and Geoforum (between 1974 and 1993). He retired from the LSE in 1995, but was appointed to an emeritus professorship there, and was made an honorary fellow in 2006. Diamond died on 6 May 2015; he was survived by his wife, Esme, and their two children.
