= Richard Hatherley Pear =

British political scientist (1916–1998)

Richard Hatherley Pear (10 March 1916 – 17 February 1998) was a British political scientist. He was Professor of Politics at the University of Nottingham from 1965. He was the son of Tom Hatherley Pear, one of the first professors of psychology in Britain. He received a Politics degree at the London School of Economics in 1938. From 1939 to 1941 he held a Commonwealth Fund Fellowship at the University of Chicago, and worked for the war effort at the British Information Services in New York. Later in the war he served in the Armoured Corps in Kenya, rising to the rank of staff captain. After the war, he taught at LSE, until his appointment at Nottingham.
