= George William Jones =

George William Jones OBE (4 February 1938 – 14 April 2017) was emeritus professor of government at the London School of Economics and the biographer, with Bernard Donoughue, of Herbert Morrison.

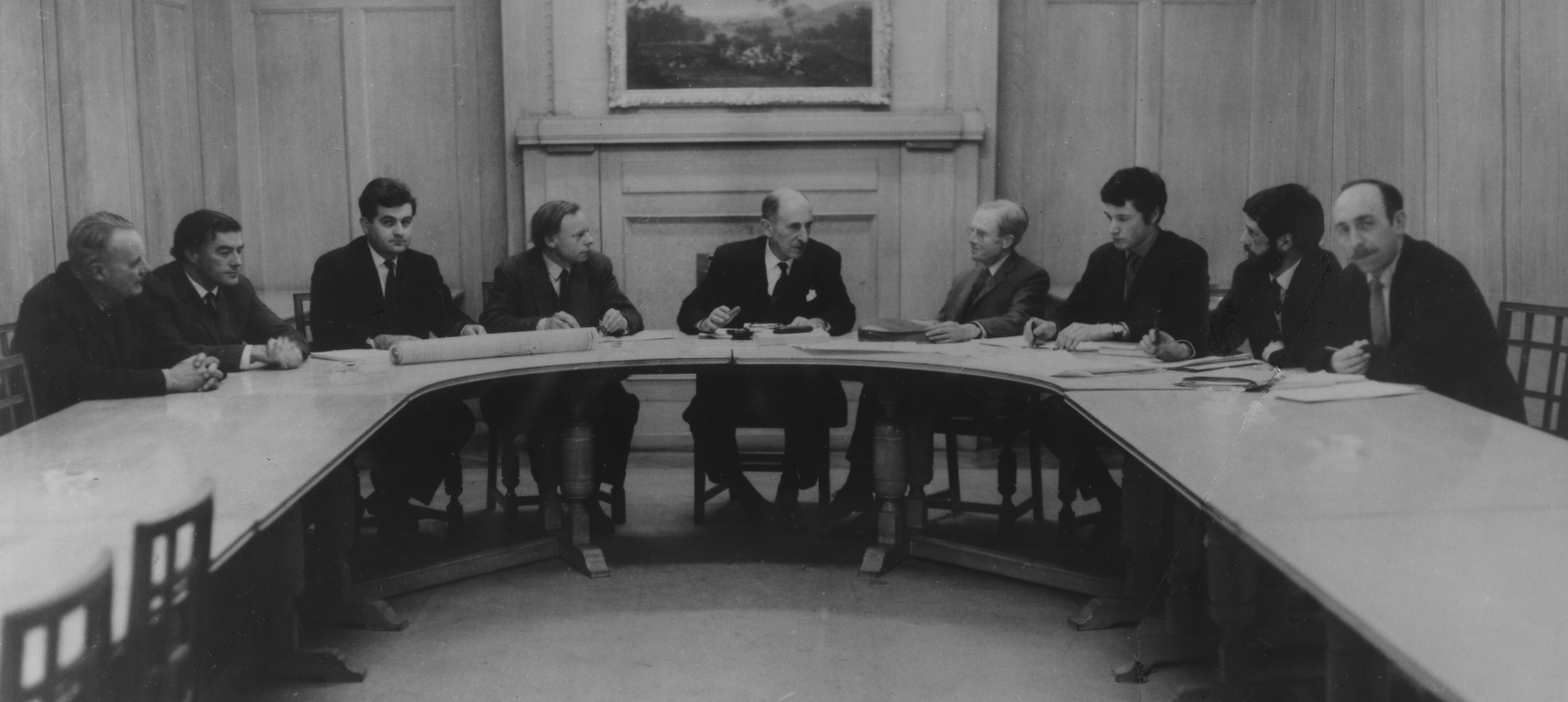
Jones (third from left) with the Greater London Group in 1968

Jones was a longtime member of the Greater London Group at LSE and in time became co-chair of it.

He was appointed OBE in the 1999 Birthday Honours for services to the National Consumer Council.

== Selected publications ==
- Herbert Morrison: Portrait of a Politician. Weidenfeld and Nicolson, London, 1973.
- "The Prime Ministers' Secretaries: Politicians or Administrators?" in J.G. Griffith (ed.), From Politics to Administration. Allen and Unwin, London, 1975.
- West European Prime Ministers. Frank Cass, London, 1991. (Editor)
- At the Centre of Whitehall. Macmillan, Basingstoke, 1998. (With J.M. Lee & J. Burnham).
- At Power's Elbow: Aides to the Prime Minister from Robert Walpole to David Cameron. Biteback Publishing, London, 2013. (With Andrew Blick)
