= Local government in London =

Greater London shown within England.

Local government in Greater London, England, takes place in two tiers: an upper tier and a lower tier. The upper tier authority is the Greater London Authority (GLA), controlled by the Mayor of London and the London Assembly. The lower tier authorities are the 32 borough councils, the City of London Corporation in the City of London and Queen's Park Community Council in Queen's Park, in the borough of Westminster.

== Upper tier ==
The Greater London Authority consists of two elected parts. They are the mayor of London, who has executive powers, and the London Assembly, who scrutinise the mayor's decisions and can accept or reject his budget proposals each year. The GLA is responsible for strategic planning, policing, the fire service, most aspects of transport and economic development. It is a recent organisation, having been set up in 2000 to replace the similar Greater London Council (GLC) which had been abolished in 1986. The headquarters of the GLA and the mayor of London was at 110 The Queen's Walk, Bermondsey, from 2002 until 2021; it is now at City Hall ("The Crystal") in Newham. The current mayor of London is Sadiq Khan who was first elected in 2016.

Health services in London are managed by the national government through the National Health Service, which is controlled and administered in London by a single strategic health authority called NHS London.

== Lower tier ==
The 33 local authorities are the 32 London borough councils and the City of London Corporation. They are responsible for local services not overseen by the GLA, such as local planning, schools, social services, local roads and refuse collection. The London boroughs each have a council made up from representatives from political parties and single issue organisations elected every four years by local residents

The City of London does not have a conventional local authority, but is governed by the historic City of London Corporation which is elected by both residents and businesses, and which has existed more or less unchanged since the Middle Ages. The head of the Corporation is the Lord Mayor of the City of London, which is a different position from that of Mayor of London. The City of London also has its own police force: The City of London Police, which is independent of the Metropolitan Police Service which covers the rest of Greater London. Within the City of London are two liberties, the Inner Temple and the Middle Temple, which are local authorities for most purposes to the present day.

1. City of London
2. City of Westminster
3. Kensington and Chelsea
4. Hammersmith and Fulham
5. Wandsworth
6. Lambeth
7. Southwark
8. Tower Hamlets
9. Hackney
10. Islington
11. Camden
12. Brent
13. Ealing
14. Hounslow
15. Richmond
16. Kingston
17. Merton
18. Sutton
19. Croydon
20. Bromley
21. Lewisham
22. Greenwich
23. Bexley
24. Havering
25. Barking and Dagenham
26. Redbridge
27. Newham
28. Waltham Forest
29. Haringey
30. Enfield
31. Barnet
32. Harrow
33. Hillingdon

== Civil parishes ==
The Local Government and Public Involvement in Health Act 2007 allowed the creation of civil parishes (and parish councils) within London boroughs, if local residents request their creation through a petition. Prior to this, civil parishes were not permitted within Greater London. However, only one civil parish has been created within London at Queen's Park in 2014. The vast majority of London is unparished.
