= Ramona Unified School District =

School district in California, United States

Location
- 720 Ninth Street; Ramona, California 92065 United States

Other information
- Website: www.ramonausd.net

Ramona Unified School District is a public school district based in the unincorporated town of Ramona, in eastern San Diego County, California.

== Schools ==
=== High School ===
- Montecito High School (Continuation)
- Ramona High School

=== Middle School ===
- Olive Peirce Middle

=== Elementary ===
- Barnett Elementary
- Hanson Elementary
- James Dukes Elementary
- Mt. Woodson Elementary
- Ramona Elementary

=== Alternative Education ===
- Mountain Valley Academy (K-12)
- Ramona Community Montessori School
