= Policy & Politics =

- Discipline: Public policy
- Language: English
- Edited by: Oscar Berglund, Claire Dunlop, Elizabeth Koebele, Christopher M. Weible

Publication details
- History: 1972–present
- Publisher: Policy Press (United Kingdom)
- Frequency: Quarterly
- Impact factor: 3.750 (2020)

Standard abbreviations
- ISO 4: Policy Politics

Indexing
- ISSN: 0305-5736 (print); 1470-8442 (web)
- OCLC no.: 2266303

Links
- Journal homepage; Online archive

Policy & Politics is a quarterly British peer-reviewed academic journal covering public policy and political science. It was established in 1972 and is published by the Policy Press of the University of Bristol. Its mission statement says that it "is committed to advancing our understanding of the dynamics of policy-making and implementation."

== History ==
The journal was established in 1972 by Macmillan Publishers with Bleddyn Davies (London School of Economics) as founding editor-in-chief. Publishing of the journal moved to SAGE Publishing in 1974, to the University of Bristol's School for Advanced Urban Studies in 1979, and to the Policy Press in 1996.

A conference celebrating the 40th anniversary of the journal was held in 2013. and its 50th anniversary year is due to be celebrated in 2022.

== Abstracting and indexing ==
The journal is abstracted and indexed in:

- Current Contents/Social & Behavioral Sciences
- EBSCO databases
- GEOBASE
- International Bibliography of the Social Sciences
- ProQuest databases
- Scopus
- Social Sciences Citation Index

According to the Journal Citation Reports, the journal had a 2020 impact factor of 3.75, ranking it in the top quartile (37th out of 182 journals) in the category "Political Science" and 13th out of 47 in the category "Public Administration".
