= List of psychology journals =

This list presents a selection of journals in the field of psychology and its branches.

== A ==
- Acta Psychologica
- Adaptive Behavior
- Adultspan Journal
- Aggressive Behavior
- Aging and Mental Health
- American Behavioral Scientist
- American Journal of Psychology
- American Psychologist
- Annual Review of Clinical Psychology
- Annual Review of Psychology
- Applied Psychological Measurement
- Archives of Scientific Psychology
- Archives of Sexual Behavior
- Archives of Suicide Research
- Asian Journal of Social Psychology
- Athletic Insight: The Online Journal of Sport Psychology

== B ==
- Basic and Applied Social Psychology
- Behavior Therapy
- Behavioral and Brain Functions
- Behavioral and Brain Sciences
- Behavioral Science & Policy
- British Journal of Clinical Psychology
- British Journal of Developmental Psychology
- British Journal of Mathematical and Statistical Psychology
- British Journal of Psychology
- British Journal of Social Psychology

== C ==
- Canadian Journal of Behavioural Science
- Canadian Journal of Experimental Psychology
- Canadian Journal of School Psychology
- Canadian Psychology
- Cerebral Cortex
- Clinical Psychological Science
- The Coaching Psychologist
- Cognition
- Cognitive Development
- Cognitive Neuropsychology
- Consciousness and Cognition
- Consulting Psychology Journal: Practice and Research
- Couple and Family Psychology
- Cultic Studies Review
- Cultural Diversity and Ethnic Minority Psychology
- Current Directions in Psychological Science
- Clinical Psychology Review

== D ==
- Developmental Psychology
- Developmental Science

== E ==
- Ecopsychology
- Emotion
- Emotion Review
- European Journal of Personality
- European Journal of Psychology of Education
- European Journal of Psychology Open
- European Journal of Social Psychology
- European Journal of Work and Organizational Psychology
- European Psychologist
- European Review of Social Psychology
- Evolution and Human Behavior
- Evolutionary Psychology
- Experimental Psychology

== F ==
- Families, Systems and Health

== G ==
- Group Processes and Intergroup Relations

== H ==
- Health Psychology

== I ==
- Intellectica
- Intelligence
- The International Journal for the Psychology of Religion
- The International Journal of Aviation Psychology
- The International Journal of Psychoanalysis
- International Journal of Psychology
- International Journal of Stress Management
- International Journal of Transgender Health
- International Perspectives in Psychology: Research, Practice, Consultation
- International Review of Sport and Exercise Psychology

== J ==
- Japanese Psychological Research
- Journal of Abnormal Child Psychology
- Journal of Abnormal Psychology
- Journal of the American Psychoanalytic Association
- Journal of Applied Behavior Analysis
- Journal of Applied Psychology
- Journal of Applied Social Psychology
- Journal of Cognitive Neuroscience
- Journal of Community and Applied Social Psychology
- Journal of Consciousness Studies
- Journal of Consulting and Clinical Psychology
- Journal of Contextual Behavioral Science
- Journal of Drug and Alcohol Research
- Journal of European Psychology Students
- Journal of Economic Psychology
- Journal of the Experimental Analysis of Behavior
- Journal of Experimental Psychology: General
- Journal of Experimental Psychology: Human Perception and Performance
- Journal of Experimental Psychology: Learning, Memory and Cognition
- Journal of Experimental Psychology: Animal Learning and Cognition
- Journal of Experimental Psychology: Applied
- Journal of Environmental Psychology
- Journal of Experimental Psychopathology
- Journal of Happiness Studies
- Journal of Health Psychology
- Journal of Homosexuality
- Journal of Humanistic Psychology
- The Journal of Individual Psychology
- Journal of Mind and Behavior
- Journal of Nervous and Mental Disease
- Journal of Neuropsychology
- Journal of Nonverbal Behavior
- Journal of Occupational and Organizational Psychology
- Journal of Occupational Health Psychology
- Journal of Personality and Social Psychology
- The Journal of Positive Psychology
- The Journal of Psychology
- Journal of Reproductive and Infant Psychology
- Journal of Research in Personality
- Journal of Sex & Marital Therapy
- Journal of Sex Research
- Journal of Theoretical and Philosophical Psychology
- Journal of Vision
- Journal of Work and Organizational Psychology

== L ==
- L'Année Psychologique

== M ==
- Mind & Language
- Mindfulness
- Motivation and Emotion
- Music Perception

== N ==
- New Ideas in Psychology

== P ==
- Perception
- Perceptual and Motor Skills
- Personal Relationships
- Personality and Individual Differences
- Personality and Social Psychology Bulletin
- Personality and Social Psychology Review
- Perspectives on Psychological Science
- Philosophical Psychology
- Professional Psychology: Research and Practice
- Psyche
- Psychological Assessment
- Psychological Bulletin
- Psychological Inquiry
- Psychological Medicine
- Psychological Methods
- Psychological Reports
- Psychological Review
- Psychological Science
- Psychological Science in the Public Interest
- Psychological Studies
- Psychological Trauma: Theory, Research, Practice, and Policy
- Psychology & Developing Societies
- Psychology and Psychotherapy: Theory, Research and Practice
- Psychology in Russia
- Psychology of Addictive Behaviors
- Psychology of Aesthetics, Creativity, and the Arts
- Psychology of Men and Masculinity
- Psychology of Music
- Psychology of Religion and Spirituality
- Psychology of Women Quarterly
- Psychology, Public Policy, and Law
- Psychometrika

== Q ==
- Quality & Quantity
- Quarterly Journal of Experimental Psychology

== R ==
- Review of General Psychology
- Review of Philosophy and Psychology

== S ==
- Sex Roles
- Social Cognition
- Social Psychological and Personality Science
- Social Psychology
- Social Psychology Quarterly
- Spirituality in Clinical Practice
- Sport, Exercise, and Performance Psychology
- Suicide and Life-Threatening Behavior
- Swiss Journal of Psychology

== T ==
- Teaching of Psychology
- Theory & Psychology
- Trends in Cognitive Sciences

== U ==
- Universitas Psychologica

== W ==
- Work & Stress
