= Marianne Schmid Mast =

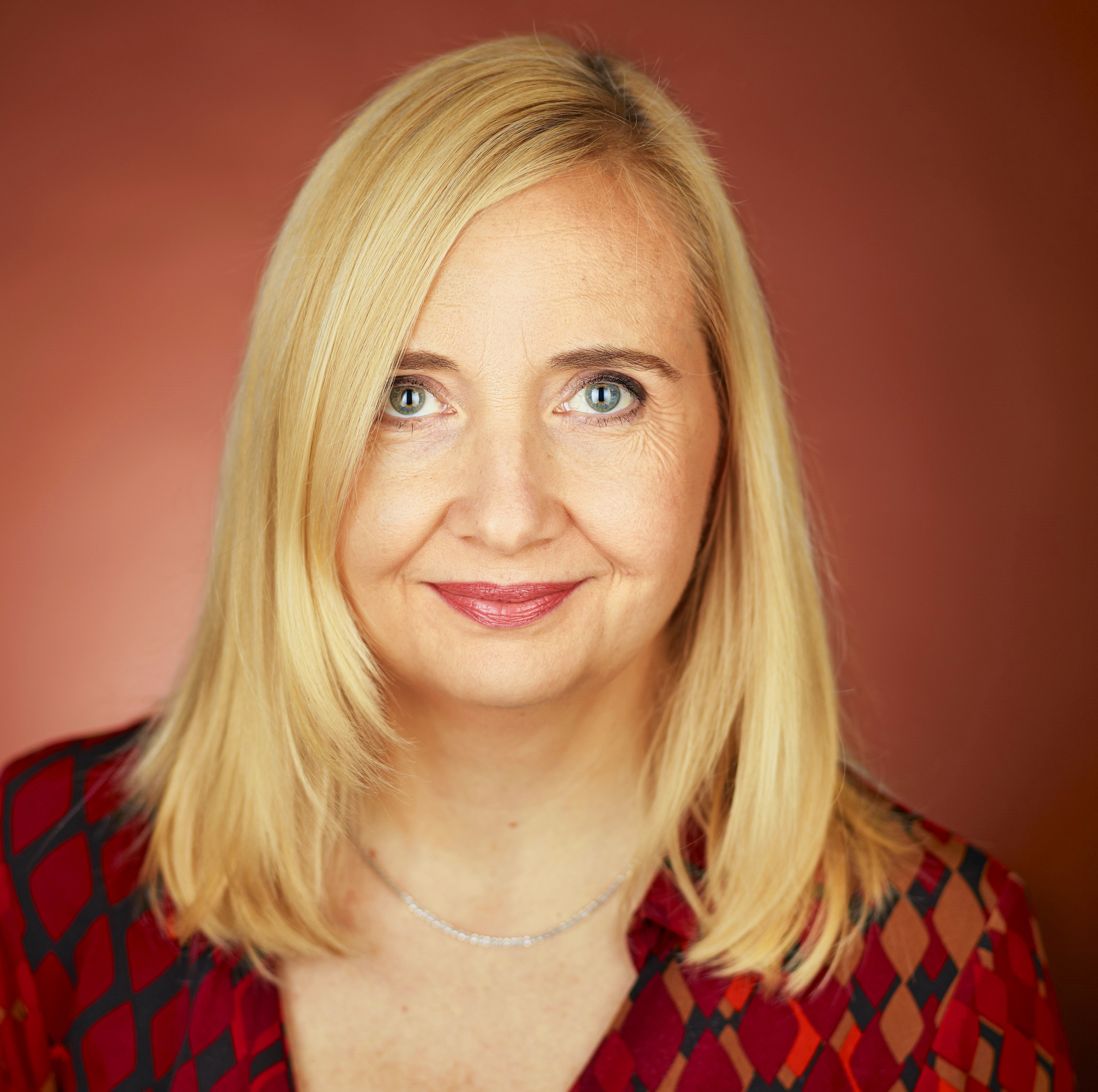
- Education: University of Zurich Ph.D. in Psychology, 2000
- Scientific career
- Fields: Organizational Behavior, Psychology
- Institutions: University of Lausanne 2014– University of Neuchâtel 2006–2014; University of Fribourg 2005–2006
- Doctoral advisor: Prof. Dr. N. Bischof
- Website: http://www.hec.unil.ch/people/mschmidmast

Marianne Schmid Mast is a Professor of Organizational Behavior and Dean of the Faculty of Business and Economics (HEC) of the University of Lausanne, Switzerland.

== Biography ==
Marianne Schmid Mast was born in Olten (Switzerland) and did her primary school in Däniken, Solothurn. When she was 10, her family moved to Oberkulm and she went to Bezirksschule Unterkulm and then to Handelsschule (Alte KantonSchule Aarau) in Aarau. After receiving her business diploma, she completed her Matura in economics at the École Supérieure de Commerce in Neuchâtel. She worked for a computer company for a year, and later on she spent half a year traveling in Brazil. She then started medical school at the University of Zurich to discover that her passion is in Psychology. This is when she started to study psychology at the University of Zurich. She was always interested in understanding the interpersonal interactions at work which led her to become a full professor of organizational behavior at the University of Lausanne. Marianne Schmid Mast is married and has two sons. The family lives in Pully.

== Academic career ==
Marianne Schmid Mast received her Master in Psychology in 1996 and her Ph.D. in psychology in 2000, both from University of Zurich. She then continued her research at Northeastern University, Boston, USA, in the Social and Personality Psychology Area, working with Judith A. Hall. Back in Switzerland at the University of Zurich in Social and Health Psychology, she was appointed assistant professor in Social Psychology at the University of Fribourg. In 2006 she became a full professor of Personnel Psychology at the Department of Work and Organizational Psychology at the University of Neuchatel and she was appointed full professor of Organizational Behavior at the University of Lausanne, in August 2014. Since 2021 she is the dean of the Faculty of Business and Economics, HEC Lausanne. She currently is a member of the editorial board of the journal Leadership Quarterly and was an associate editor of the Journal of Nonverbal Behavior. She is a former president of the Swiss Psychological Association and in 2018, 2019, and 2020 she was nominated as one of the 50 most influential living psychologists worldwide and has been appointed a Fellow of the Society of Personality and Social Psychology, as well as a Division 8 Fellow of the American Psychological Association (APA) for her extraordinary, distinctive and longstanding contributions to the science of personality and social psychology.

== Research ==
Her research addresses how individuals in power hierarchies interact with others, how they perceive their social interaction partners, and how they communicate (verbally and nonverbally). Moreover, she studies how first impressions affect interpersonal interactions and evaluations and how people form accurate impressions of others. One aspect of her research is concerned with how physician communication affects patient outcomes. She uses immersive virtual environment technology to investigate interpersonal behavior and communication as well as computer-based automatic sensing to analyze nonverbal behavior in social interactions.

== Virtual reality ==
Marianne Schmid Mast has created her immersive virtual reality laboratory when she was at the University of Neuchâtel in 2006. In 2014, the laboratory was moved with her to the Faculty of Business and Economics, HEC, at the University of Lausanne and is subsequently known under the name of Interpersonal Behavior Laboratory. She uses immersive virtual reality for the study of human social interaction behavior and for interpersonal skills training.

== Selected publications ==
- Muralidhar, S., Nguyen, L. S., Frauendorfer, D., Odobez, J. M., Schmid Mast, M., & Gatica-Perez, D. (2016, October). Training on the job: Behavioral analysis of job interviews in hospitality. In Proceedings of the 18th ACM International Conference on Multimodal Interaction (pp. 84–91). ACM. doi:10.1145/2993148.2993191
- Latu, I. M. & Schmid Mast, M. (2016). Male interviewers' nonverbal dominance predicts lower evaluations of female applicants in simulated job interviews. Journal of Personnel Psychology, 15 (3), 116–124. doi:10.1027/1866-5888/a000159
- Carrard, V., Schmid Mast, M., & Cousin, G. (2016). Beyond "One Size Fits All": Physician nonverbal adaptability to patients' need for paternalism and its positive consultation outcomes. Health Communication, 31(11), 1327–1333. doi:10.1080/10410236.2015.1052871
- Cousin, G., & Schmid Mast, M. (2016). Trait-agreeableness influences individual reactions to a physician's affiliative behavior in a simulated bad news delivery. Health Communication, 31(3), 320–327. doi:10.1080/10410236.2015.1007827
- Murphy, N., Schmid Mast, M., & Hall, J. A. (2016). Nonverbal self-accuracy: Individual differences in knowing one’s own social interaction behavior. Personality and Individual Differences, 101, 30–34. doi:10.1016/j.paid.2016.05.023
- Bombari, D., Schmid Mast, M., Cañadas, E., & Bachmann, M., (2015). Studying social interactions through immersive virtual environment technology: Virtues, pitfalls, and future challenges. Frontiers in Psychology, 6, 869. doi:10.3389/fpsyg.2015.00869
- Bourquin, C., Stiefel, F., Schmid Mast, M., Bonvin, R., & Berney, A. (2015). Well, you have hepatic metastases: Use of technical language by medical students in simulated patient interviews. Patient Education and Counseling, 98(3), 323–330. doi:10.1016/j.pec.2014.11.017
- Carrard, V., & Schmid Mast, M. (2015). Physician behavioral adaptability: A model to outstrip a “one size fits all” approach. Patient Education and Counseling, 98(10), 1243–1247. doi:10.1016/j.pec.2015.07.028
- Frauendorfer, D., Schmid Mast, M., Sanchez-Cortes, D., & Gatica-Perez, D. (2015). Emergent power hierarchies and group performance. International Journal of Psychology, 50(5), 392–396. doi:10.1002/ijop.12102
- Frauendorfer, D., Schmid Mast, M., & Sutter, C. (2015). To include or not to include? Accuracy of personality judgements from resumes with and without photographs. Swiss Journal of Psychology, 74(4), 207–215. doi:10.1024/1421-0185/a000163
- Hall, J. A., Goh, J. X., Schmid Mast, M., & Hagedorn, C. (2015). Individual differences in accurately assessing personality from text. Journal of Personality. Advance online publication. doi:10.1111/jopy.12170
- Hall, J. A., Roter, D. L., Blanch-Hartigan, D., Schmid Mast, M., & Pitegoff, C. A. (2015). How patient-centered do female physicians need to be? Analogue patients’ satisfaction with male and female physicians’ identical behaviors. Health Communication, 30(9), 894–900. doi:10.1080/10410236.2014.900892
- Hall, J. A., Schmid Mast, M., & Latu I. M. (2015). The vertical dimension of social relations and accurate interpersonal perception: A meta-analysis. The Journal of Nonverbal Behavior, 39(2), 131–163. doi:10.1007/s10919-014-0205-1
- Latu, I. M., Schmid Mast, M., & Stewart, T. (2015). Gender biases in (inter)action: The role of interviewers’ and applicants’ implicit and explicit stereotypes in predicting women’s job interview outcomes. Psychology of Women Quarterly. Advance online publication. doi:10.1177/0361684315577383
- Murphy, N. A., Hall, J. A., Schmid Mast, M., Ruben, M. A., Frauendorfer, D., Blanch-Hartigan, D., Roter, D. L., & Nguyen, L. (2015). Reliability and validity of nonverbal thin slices in social interactions. Personality and Social Psychology Bulletin, 41(2), 199–213. doi:10.1177/0146167214559902
- Ruben, M. A., Hall, J. A., & Schmid Mast, M. (2015). Smiling in a job interview: When less is more. The Journal of Social Psychology, 155(2), 107–126. doi:10.1080/00224545.2014.972312
- Schmid, P. C., Schmid Mast, M., & Mast, F. (2015). Prioritizing: The strategy of the powerful? Quarterly Journal of Experimental Psychology, 68(10), 2097–2105. doi:10.1080/17470218.2015.1008525
- Schmid Mast, M., Gatica-Perez, D., Frauendorfer, D., Nguyen, L., & Choudhury, T. (2015) Social sensing for psychology: Automated interpersonal behavior assessment. Current Directions in Psychological Science, 24(2), 154–160. doi:10.1177/0963721414560811
- Frauendorfer, D., Schmid Mast, M., Nguyen, L., & Gatica-Perez, D. (2014). Nonverbal social sensing in action: Unobtrusive recording and extracting of nonverbal behavior in social interactions illustrated with a research example. Journal of Nonverbal Behavior, 38(2), 231–245. doi:10.1007/s10919-014-0173-5
- Klöckner Cronauer, C., & Schmid Mast, M. (2014). Hostile sexist male patients and female doctors: A challenging encounter. The Patient: Patient-Centered Outcomes Research, 7(1), 37–45. doi:10.1007/s40271-013-0025-0
- Nguyen, L. S., D., Frauendorfer, D., Schmid Mast, M., & Gatica-Perez, D. (2014). Hire me: Computational inference of hirability in employment interviews based on nonverbal behavior. IEEE Transactions on Multimedia, 16(4), 1018–1031. doi:10.1109/TMM.2014.2307169
- Schmid Mast, M., & Darioly, A. (2014). Emotion recognition accuracy in hierarchical relationships. Swiss Journal of Psychology, 73(2), 69–75. doi:10.1024/1421-0185/a000124
- Bombari, D., Schmid, P. C., Schmid Mast, M., Birri, S., Mast, F. W., & Lobmaier, J. S. (2013). Emotion recognition: The role of featural and configural face information. The Quarterly Journal of Experimental Psychology, 66(12), 2426–2442. doi:10.1080/17470218.2013.789065
- Bombari, D., Schmid Mast, M., Brosch, T., & Sander, D. (2013). How interpersonal power affects empathic accuracy: Differential roles of mentalizing versus mirroring? Frontiers in Human Neuroscience, 7, 375. doi:10.3389/fnhum.2013.00375
- Cousin, G., & Schmid Mast, M. (2013). Agreeable patient meets affiliative physician: How physician behavior affects patient outcomes depends on patient personality. Patient Education and Counseling, 90(3), 399–404. doi:10.1016/j.pec.2011.02.010
- Cousin, G., Schmid Mast, M., & Jaunin, N. (2013). Finding the right interactional temperature: Do colder patients need more warmth in physician communication style? Social Science & Medicine, 98, 18–23. doi:10.1016/j.socscimed.2013.08.034
- Cousin, G., Schmid Mast, M., & Jaunin, N. (2013). When physician expressed uncertainty leads to patient dissatisfaction: A gender study. Medical Education, 47(9), 923–931. doi:10.1111/medu.12237
- Frauendorfer, D., & Schmid Mast, M. (2013). Hiring gender-occupation incongruent applicants: The positive impact of recruiter interpersonal sensitivity. Journal of Personnel Psychology, 12, 182–188. doi:10.1027/1866-5888/a000095
- Latu, I. M., Schmid Mast, M., Lammers, J., & Bombari, D. (2013). Successful female leaders empower women's behavior in leadership tasks. Journal of Experimental Social Psychology, 49(3), 444–448. doi:10.1016/j.jesp.2013.01.003
- Sanchez-Cortes, D., Aran, O., Jayagopi, D. B., Schmid Mast, M., & Gatica-Perez, D. (2013). Emergent leaders through looking and speaking: From audio-visual data to multimodal recognition. Journal on Multimodal User Interfaces, 7(1), 39–53. doi:10.1007/s12193-012-0101-0
- Schmid, P. C. & Schmid Mast, M. (2013). Power increases performance in a social evaluation situation as a result of decreased stress responses. European Journal of Social Psychology, 43(3), 201–211. doi:10.1002/ejsp.1937
- Cousin, G., Schmid Mast, M., Roter, D. L., & Hall, J. A. (2012). Concordance between physician communication style and patient attitudes predicts patient satisfaction. Patient Education and Counseling, 87(2), 193–197. doi:10.1016/j.pec.2011.08.004
- Sanchez-Cortes, D., Aran, O., Schmid Mast, M., & Gatica-Perez, D. (2012). A nonverbal behavior approach to identify emergent leaders in small groups. IEEE Transactions on Multimedia, 14, 816–832. doi:10.1109/TMM.2011.2181941
- Schmid Mast, M., Jonas, K., Klöckner Cronauer, C., & Darioly, A. (2012). On the importance of the superior’s interpersonal sensitivity for good leadership. Journal of Applied Social Psychology, 42(5), 1043–1068. doi:10.1111/j.1559-1816.2011.00852.x
- Lu, H., Frauendorfer, D., Rabbi, M., Schmid Mast, M. S., Chittaranjan, G. T., Campbell, A. T., ... & Choudhury, T. (2012, September). StressSense: Detecting stress in unconstrained acoustic environments using smartphones. In Proceedings of the 2012 ACM Conference on Ubiquitous Computing (pp. 351–360). ACM. doi:10.1145/2370216.2370270
- Darioly, A., & Schmid Mast, M. (2011). Facing an incompetent leader: The effects of a nonexpert leader on subordinates’ perception and behaviour. European Journal of Work and Organizational Psychology, 20(2), 239–265. doi:10.1080/13594320903429576
- Schmid, P. C., Schmid Mast, M., Bombari, D., & Mast, F. W. (2011). Gender effects in information processing on a nonverbal decoding task. Sex Roles, 65(1–2), 102–107. doi:10.1007/s11199-011-9979-3
- Schmid, P. C., Schmid Mast, M., Bombari, D., Mast, F. W., & Lobmaier, J. S. (2011). How mood states affect information processing during facial emotion recognition: An eye tracking study. Swiss Journal of Psychology, Special Issue: Social Cues in Faces, 70(4), 223–231. doi:10.1024/1421-0185/a000060
- Schmid Mast, M., Bangerter, A., Bulliard, C., & Aerni, G. (2011). How accurate are recruiters’ first impressions of applicants in employment interviews? International Journal of Selection and Assessment, 19(2), 198–208. doi:10.1111/j.1468-2389.2011.00547.x
- Schmid Mast, M., Frauendorfer, D., & Popovic, L. (2011). Self-promoting and modest job applicants in different cultures. Journal of Personnel Psychology, 10(2), 70–77. doi:10.1027/1866-5888/a000034
- Schmid Mast, M., Hall, J. A., Klöckner Cronauer, C., & Cousin, G. (2011). Perceived dominance in physicians: Are female physicians under scrutiny? Patient Education and Counseling, 83(2), 174–179. doi:10.1016/j.pec.2010.06.030
- Schulz, P. J., Bangerter, A., & Schmid Mast, M. (2011). Adaptivity in health communication. Studies in Communication Sciences, 11(1), 7–13.
- Cousin, G., & Schmid Mast, M. (2010). Les médecins hommes et femmes interagissent de manière différente avec leurs patients: Pourquoi s’en préoccuper? Revue Médicale Suisse, 257(6), 1444–1447.
- Klöckner Cronauer, C., & Schmid Mast, M. (2010). Geschlechtsspezifische Aspekte des Gesprächs zwischen Arzt und Patient (Gender-specific aspects of the physician-patient interaction). Rehabilitation, 49(5), 308–314. doi:10.1055/s-0030-1262850
- Morina, N., Maier, T., & Schmid Mast, M. (2010). Lost in translation? Psychotherapie unter Einsatz von Dolmetschern. (Psychotherapy using interpreters). Psychotherapie Psychosomatik Medizinische Psychologie, 60(3–4), 104–110. doi:10.1055/s-0029-1202271
- Sauer, J., Darioly, A., Schmid Mast, M., Schmid, P. C., & Bischof, N. (2010). A multi-level approach of evaluating crew resource management training: A laboratory-based study examining communication skills as a function of team congruence. Ergonomics, 58(11), 1311–1324. doi:10.1080/00140139.2010.519054
- Schmid, P. C., & Schmid Mast, M. (2010). Mood effects on emotion recognition. Motivation and Emotion, 34(3), 288–292. doi:10.1007/s11031-010-9170-0
- Schmid Mast, M. (2010). Interpersonal behaviour and social perception in a hierarchy: The interpersonal power and behaviour model. European Review of Social Psychology, 21(1), 1–33. doi:10.1080/10463283.2010.486942
- Schmid Mast, M., Hall, J. A., & Schmid, P. C. (2010). Wanting to be boss and wanting to be subordinate: Effects on performance motivation. Journal of Applied Social Psychology, 40(2), 458–472. doi:10.1111/j.1559-1816.2009.00582.x
