= Indian psychology =

Subfield of psychology

Indian psychology refers to an emerging scholarly and scientific subfield of psychology. Psychologists working in this field are retrieving the psychological ideas embedded in indigenous Indian religious and spiritual traditions and philosophies, and expressing these ideas in psychological terms that permit further psychological research and application. 'Indian psychology' in this sense does not mean 'the psychology of the Indian people', or 'psychology as taught at Indian universities'. The Indian Psychology Movement refers to psychologists encouraging or carrying out the recently expanded activity in this field, especially in the Indian Knowledge System (IKS).

Although some research scholarship in this field occurred as early as the 1930s, activity intensified after the Manifesto on Indian Psychology was issued in 2002 by more than 150 psychologists gathered in Pondicherry, India, led by K. Ramakrishna Rao, Girishwar Misra, and others. Since the issuance of the Manifesto, psychologists active in this field have produced scholarly and scientific publications that include a textbook, a handbook, several other edited volumes, a journal special issue, and a variety of other books and journal articles. Conferences on Indian psychology have been held in several Indian cities, sometimes drawing scores of presentations.

Topics addressed by Indian psychology research and scholarship have included conceptions or processes relevant to values, personality, perception, cognition, emotion, creativity, education, and spirituality as well as applications such as meditation, yoga, and ayurveda, and case studies of prominent spiritual figures and their legacies. Indian psychology subscribes to methodological pluralism and especially emphasizes universal perspectives that pertain primarily to a person's inner state, and are not otherworldly, religious, or dogmatic, and with special emphasis on applications that foster the positive transformation of human conditions toward achievement and well-being. Indian psychology views itself as complementary to modern psychology, capable of expanding modern psychology's limits, and capable of being integrated with many parts of modern psychology. Other scholarly and scientific fields that are relevant to Indian psychology and often partly overlap with it include modern scientific psychology, neurophysiology, consciousness studies, and Indian philosophy and religion.

== Definition and naming ==
Major books in Indian psychology define the field as pertaining to the study of psychological ideas derived from traditional Indian thought. For example, Cornelissen, Misra, and Varma (2014) wrote that "by Indian psychology we mean an approach to psychology that is based on ideas and practices that developed over thousands of years within the Indian sub-continent.... we do not mean, for example, 'the psychology of the Indian people', or 'psychology as taught at Indian universities'". Rao (2014) wrote that Indian psychology "refers to a system/school of psychology derived from classical Indian thought and rooted in the psychologically relevant practices such as yoga prevalent in the Indian subcontinent for centuries." Rao (2008) explained that the term "Indian psychology" has long been used in such a manner, writing that

we prefer to use the name Indian psychology... because this usage is consistent with the universally accepted sense of the analogous subject, Indian philosophy. Also, 'Indian psychology' is the name used by those who pioneered in the area of applying classical Indian thought to contemporary psychology... Jadunath Sinha in his three volumes entitled Indian Psychology [published beginning 1933]... [and by] Rhys Davids... The Birth of Indian Psychology and Its Development in Buddhism (1936)... followed by Raghunath Safaya's one volume Indian Psychology (1976) and B. Kuppaswamy's book Elements of Ancient Indian Psychology (1985). We believe the term Indian psychology has come to stay and with its expected wider popularity... is likely to be universally shared.

Cornelissen (2014) expressed concern about possible confusion, writing that "Indian psychology.... is a name that needs explanation every time it is used... and it continues to court controversy due to its associations with various forms of Indian nationalism. For an approach to science with claims of universality, this is a problematic encumbrance".

The "Indian psychology movement" and the "Indian psychological movement" are terms used to designate the recently expanding interest and activity in Indian psychology, especially after the issuance of the Manifesto of Indian Psychology (2002). For example, Bhawuk (2011) wrote that "I was delighted to join the group of Indian Psychologists from Vishakhapatnam in what I have called the Indian Psychological Movement".

== History ==
During the 20th century scholars had intermittently studied the psychological ideas embedded in Indian traditions. This process substantially accelerated at the turn of the 21st century, which saw the issuance of the Manifesto on Indian Psychology (2002) as a milestone for what has been called the Indian Psychology Movement. For catalyzing this intensified interest, S. K. Kiran Kumar (2008) wrote that

two specific developments... have played key roles in stimulating investigators to examine and incorporate Indian psychological thoughts into current literature. First, in 1960s and 1970s, the increasing popularity of meditation and Yoga... the increasing interest in the study of consciousness... and the emergence of transpersonal psychology... brought to focus the Indian religio-spiritual and philosophical traditions.... Secondly, the increase in cross-cultural research and the development of cross-cultural psychology... led to a greater appreciation of the paradigmatic limitations of modern scientific psychology, which render the claim of its universality doubtful.

Other contributing factors were the sense that there had been in India a "painful neglect of the indigenous tradition", and that modern psychology as studied in India was "essentially a Western transplant, unable to connect with the Indian ethos and concurrent community conditions.... by and large imitative and replicative of Western studies".

=== Manifesto ===
From September 29 to October 1, 2002, more than 150 Indian psychologists met in Pondicherry at the National Conference on Yoga and Indian Approaches to Psychology. These psychologists issued a declaration that has become known as the Manifesto on Indian Psychology, which was published in Psychological Studies, the journal of the Indian National Academy of Psychology. The Manifesto affirmed that "Rich in content, sophisticated in its methods and valuable in its applied aspects, Indian psychology is pregnant with possibilities for the birth of new models in psychology that would have relevance not only to India but also to psychology in general.... By Indian psychology we mean a distinct psychological tradition that is rooted in Indian ethos and thought, including the variety of psychological practices that exist in the country". The Manifesto also recommended eight "necessary steps for responsibly promoting psychology in India" that ranged from preparing resource materials to offering student fellowships, conducting seminars, offering courses, generating a website, and appointing a committee for follow-up action to ensure the implementation of the recommendations.

As described by Rao and Paranjpe (2016), the conference attendees

unanimously proclaimed the Manifesto of Indian Psychology. It was a declaration of their conviction that psychological concepts and ideas inherent in Indian tradition have much to contribute to advance psychological knowledge in general and that their neglect by psychologists in India is responsible in a large measure to the current unsavoury state of psychology in the country. They reiterated their resolve to reorient psychology along the lines shaped by India’s intellectual and spiritual history and ethos.

=== Goals and progress ===
Rao and Paranjpe (2016) reported that about a year after the issuance of the Manifesto, "a smaller group assembled in Visakhapatnam and worked out a plan to prepare a set of three volumes, a handbook, a textbook, and a sourcebook of Indian psychology. By 2016, both the handbook and textbook had been published, but the sourcebook project had "languished... mainly because it has not been easy to find either psychologists who have deep knowledge of the classic works in Sanskrit, Pāli, and Ardhamāgadhi or classicists sufficiently aware of the perspectives and needs of psychology today", but that plans for the sourcebook were "still on", and that they hoped that the sourcebook would "soon be completed".

Dalal (2014) reported that "efforts to build Indian psychology as a vibrant discipline" have received impetus through several conferences that have taken place in Pondicherry (2001, 2002, 2004), Kollam (2001), Delhi (2002, 2003, 2007), Visakhapatnam (2002, 2003, 2006), and Bengaluru (2007). The Bengaluru (2007) conference on the SVYASA campus was national in scope and involved the presentation of over 120 papers in seven plenary sessions and 25 concurrent sessions. Multiple books on Indian psychology have emerged from conference proceedings.

Oman and Singh (2018) stated that "The Indian psychology movement has made substantial strides in incorporating theory- and realization-derived content". Indian psychology texts have been favorably reviewed in journals dedicated to a variety of other fields and subfields of psychology. Other external impacts to date include a meta-analysis published in Psychological Bulletin, in which Sedlmeier and his meta-analytic colleagues, for determining basic traditional teachings relevant to meditation, "lean heavily on the recent Indian psychology movement, which originated in India but includes experts on diverse theoretical approaches to meditation from both East and West".

== Topics, characteristics, and methods ==
Varied topics have been addressed to date in Indian psychology publications. Chaudhary noted that the Handbook contains sections on schools of thought (Jainism, Buddhism, Hinduism, and various related traditions), specific psychological processes and constructs ("values, personality, perception, cognition, emotion, creativity, education, and spirituality"), and applications to individual psychology and group dynamics, including meditation from different traditions, yoga, and ayurveda. The Indian psychology literature also includes case studies of a number of prominent Indian spiritual figures and their legacies, including Saint Tukārāma, B. G. Tilak, Ramana Maharshi, Mahatma Gandhi, Akhilananda and Eknath Easwaran.

Dalal (2014) stated that Indian psychology can be deemed as "universal [and not] subsumed under indigenous or cultural psychology if that implies delimiting the scope of psychological inquiry.... deals primarily with the inner state of a person.... [and is] spiritual in its orientation [but that] does not mean otherworldly, nor does it mean being religious or dogmatic .... [is] based on veridical methods.... [that] rely on the blending of first person and second person perspectives .... [and] is applied.... concerned about... practices that can be used for the transformation of human conditions toward perfection... of the person to higher levels of achievement and well-being" (emphases in original).

Rao and Paranjpe (2016) stated that Indian psychology

subscribes to methodological pluralism. Without rejecting objectivity, control, and simplicity of experimental exploration, Indian psychology recognizes the need to go beyond experimentation to usefully capture the richness and manifold complexity of human experience to embrace and accommodate phenomenological methods as coequals.

Arulmani (2007) stated that "In the same manner that Western psychology is committed to the deployment of techniques to make valid and reliable objective observations, the Indian tradition has developed a wide variety of methods to sharpen the quality and reliability of inner, subjective observations".

== Relation to other fields ==
Rao and Paranjpe (2016) wrote that "We should consider the Western and Indian approaches not as either or but mutually complementary and reinforcing models."

Oman and Singh (2018) wrote that "Like modern psychological paradigms, many indigenous Indian paradigms are framed universally and can be explored for relevance to diverse populations worldwide. The Indian psychology movement aims to reclaim traditional riches while expanding and refining the best of modern psychology".

Chakkarath (2005) argues along similar lines, pointing out that systemically elaborated psychological theories that were developed in India before European colonization are also concerned with universal psychological questions, but at the same time provide divergent answers that can be very useful for the development of a more culturally sensitive and at the same time internationally oriented psychology.

Rao, Paranjpe, and Dalal (2008) wrote that "Indian psychology recognizes that physical processes influence mental functions, but it also stresses that mental functions influence bodily processes.... Therefore, neurophysiological studies are not considered irrelevant to Indian psychology, but are regarded as insufficient to give us a complete understanding of human nature".

Oman and Singh (2018) wrote that "psychologists connected to diverse religious traditions have engaged in what we may call epistemic integration [in which researchers] have generated texts and conducted research that explicitly respects one or more [religious/spiritual] traditions as sources of knowledge.... The Indian psychology movement may be viewed as in part an epistemic integration attempt and in part as an attempt to expand modern psychology".

Rao and Paranjpe (2016) wrote that "In the Indian tradition the guru (preceptor)… occupies an intermediate position between first-person experience of the practitioner and the final self-certifying state of pure consciousness, playing an indispensable role of mediation and providing a second-person perspective to supplement third-person and first-person approaches. … [which yields an] important methodological addition to psychological research suggested by Indian psychology".

Oman and Singh (2018) wrote that "In studying religion/spirituality, US psychologists have emphasized empirical work, whereas the Indian psychology movement has emphasized insights from experience and realization. Through collaboration, Indian and US psychologists can learn from each other and combine the strengths of the two approaches."

== Publications (selected) ==
The Pondicherry Manifesto on Indian Psychology was published in Psychological Studies, the journal of the Indian National Academy of Psychology:

- Cornelissen, Matthijs (2002). "Pondicherry Manifesto of Indian Psychology". Psychological Studies. 47 (1–3): 168–169. ISSN 0033-2968.

Both edited and authored books have helped define the field of Indian psychology.

Edited books include:

- Rao, K. Ramakrishna; Paranjpe, Anand C.; Dalal, Ajit K., eds. (2008). Handbook of Indian Psychology. New Delhi: Cambridge University Press India. doi:10.1017/UPO9788175968448. ISBN 9788175966024. OCLC 837199762
  - Reviewed in multiple journals
- Cornelissen, Matthijs; Misra, Girishwar; Varma, Suneet, eds. (2011). Foundations of Indian psychology (Theories and concepts, Vol. 1; Practical applications, Vol. 2) (1st ed.). Delhi: Pearson. OCLC 745468284 ISBN 9788131730843 (Vol. 1), ISBN 9788131730850 (Vol. 2).
  - (Second edition in one volume) Cornelissen, Matthijs; Misra, Girishwar; Varma, Suneet, eds. (2014). Foundations and Applications of Indian psychology (2nd ed.). Delhi: Dorling Kindersley. ISBN 9789332537460. ISBN 9789332526365, OCLC 976000841

Authored books include:

- Rao, K. Ramakrishna; Paranjpe, Anand C. (2016). Psychology in the Indian Tradition. New Delhi; Heidelberg: Springer. doi:10.1007/978-81-322-2440-2. ISBN 9788132224396. OCLC 930772860
- Rao, K. Ramakrishna (2011). Cognitive anomalies, consciousness, and Yoga. Centre for Studies in Civilizations. ISBN 9788191014228. OCLC 703547641
  - Reviewed in multiple journals
- Bhawuk, Dharm P. S. (18 March 2011). Spirituality and Indian psychology: Lessons from the Bhagavad-Gita. New York, NY: Springer. ISBN 9781441981103. OCLC 719363212
  - Reviewed in journal

Books that collected conference papers include:

- Joshi, Kireet; Cornelissen, Matthijs, eds. (2004). Consciousness, Indian psychology and yoga. New Delhi: Centre for Studies in Civilizations. ISBN 9788187586173. OCLC 760642604
- Rao, K. Ramakrishna; Marwaha, Sonali Bhatt, eds. (2005). Towards a spiritual psychology: Essays in Indian psychology. New Delhi: Samvad India Foundation. ISBN 9788190131841. OCLC 295034825

Journal articles that have discussed Indian psychology include:

- A target article, with commentary and reply, on the relationship between Indian Psychology and positive psychology, published in the June 2014 issue of Psychological Studies:
  - Target article: Rao, K. Ramakrishna (2014). "Positive Psychology and Indian Psychology In Need of Mutual Reinforcement". Psychological Studies. 59 (2): 94–102. doi:10.1007/s12646-013-0228-4.
- European and Indian psychologists collaborated in extracting psychological ideas from traditional Indian Samkhya and Yoga philosophies:
  - Sedlmeier, Peter; Srinivas, Kunchapudi (2016). "How Do Theories of Cognition and Consciousness in Ancient Indian Thought Systems Relate to Current Western Theorizing and Research?" (PDF). Frontiers in Psychology. 7 343. doi:10.3389/fpsyg.2016.00343.
- Two western-based scholars, including the editor of the journal Mindfulness, presented a list of twelve "generative topics for collaboration and integration" (p. 175) of western and Indian psychology, arguing that there were many opportunities for collaboration between western and Indian psychologists.
  - Oman, Doug; Singh, Nirbhay N. (2018). "Combining Indian and Western Spiritual Psychology: Applications to Health and Social Renewal". Psychological Studies. 63 (2): 172–180. doi:10.1007/s12646-016-0362-x.
- An Indian psychologist describes four approaches to building psychological models from ideas encountered in scriptures:
  - Bhawuk, Dharm P. S. (2010). "Methodology for Building Psychological Models from Scriptures". Psychology and Developing Societies. 22 (1): 49–93. doi:10.1177/097133360902200103.
