= Theoretical psychology =

Domain of psychology concerning theory and philosophy

Theoretical psychology is concerned with theoretical and philosophical aspects of psychology. It is an interdisciplinary field with a wide scope of study.

It focuses on combining and incorporating existing and developing theories of psychology non-experimentally. Theoretical psychology originated from the philosophy of science, with logic and rationality at the base of each new idea. It existed before empirical or experimental psychology. Theoretical psychology is an interdisciplinary field involving psychologists specializing in a wide variety of psychological branches. There have been a few prominent pioneers of theoretical psychology such as Wilhelm Wundt, William James, Sigmund Freud, and John B. Watson. There have also been a number of notable contributors, which include Jerome Kagan, Alan E. Kazdin, Robert Sternberg, Kenneth J. Gergen, and Ulric Neisser. These contributors may publish in a variety of journals, including journals for general psychology, like American Psychologist. There are several journals dedicated specifically to theoretical psychology, like Theory & Psychology and Journal of Theoretical and Philosophical Psychology. Many other organizations are beginning to recognize theoretical psychology as a formal subdivision of psychology.

== Origin ==
Theoretical psychology emerged from philosophy, more specifically from the philosophy of science. Philosophy strives to understand nature and structure of concepts, the laws in which these concepts occur, and the theories that combine the laws together. One of these specific branches of philosophy of science is theoretical psychology. Philosophy of science does not use the scientific method to empirically derive ideas about the physical world through conducting experiments and interpreting results. However, it is still about science, with an emphasis on the logic and rationality behind science itself, bringing to light what cannot be explained by empirical measures. It is also metaphysically and epistemologically focused on all humans while incorporating the nature and essence of human knowledge. Just as the philosophy of science is to science, theoretical psychology is to psychology in that it is the logic and rationality applied to concepts, laws, and theories. Theoretical psychology is not in place to discern which theories are more truthful or more correct. Many consider theoretical psychology as the support or rationalization of an "idea" within psychological theory that is more "truthful". However, this is not the case. Theoretical psychology is scientifically grounded in ideas of what is known through epistemology.

Theoretical psychology existed long before any branches of traditional empirical and experimental psychology. As a result, there is much more depth and breadth of knowledge from which to draw, making it less common for new developments to come about in the present day because many "new" approaches are drawing from and revitalizing past theories. In doing so, new knowledge, frames of reference, and mindsets are brought to these foundational theories. This may be due to ideas taking longer to develop and gain momentum than related fields in empirical based psychology.

== Relationship to philosophy and scope ==
Theoretical psychology is a rational, non-experimental approach to psychology. In psychology, as with any field of study, there are three philosophical perspectives and methodologies of ways to derive knowledge about the reality of the world. Rationalism (use of intellect and reason of the mind), Empiricism (use of our individually experienced sensorium), and Skepticism (knowledge beyond mere appearance that is not able to be studied) characterize the three perspectives in understanding theoretical concepts relating to laws which help to understand larger theoretical theories.

Of the philosophical perspectives, rationalism is the most pertinent to this discipline of psychology. Theoretical psychology is not experimental or clinically based and instead focuses on non-experimental ways to acquire knowledge about psychological topics. It explores the theoretical knowledge behind its encompassed ideologies. Oftentimes this includes, but is not limited to, non-experimental critiques to different schools of thought, and the usefulness of psychological concepts.Theoretical psychology is a discipline that bases its information through inference, as opposed to empirically acquired information. Hypotheses are then exchanged and further built upon from different perspectives. Theoretical psychology also deals with manipulating non-scientific, common words (hypothetical constructs) into scientifically objective terms (intervening variables). Theoretical psychology requires full agreement on the different viewpoints to be able to see the point as a theory. As a result, many of its topics remain in continuous debate.

Theoretical psychology is the logic of psychology and all of its components. This means when theories within psychology oppose or compete, theoretical psychology does not select which is correct. It describes the nature and composition of psychology's many ideas. To explain the logic of psychology, there has been a conclusion of the principles belonging to the three classified areas. Psychology is built on the principle of being able to reference observable behavior, physical environment, and/or physiological states. Theoretical psychology is an important aspect that continues to play a role in modern psychology. While there are some downfalls to theoretical psychology, there are also strengths and benefits it brings to the field.

Theoretical psychology covers a vast scope. Professionals have the opportunity to use this method of seeking out theoretical knowledge to begin research in a variety of subjects. This allows for knowledge to be explored by means of inference rather than seeking out tangible data to draw ideas. Theoretical psychology is an interdisciplinary field involving psychologists specializing in cognitive psychology, social psychology, developmental psychology, personality psychology, clinical psychology, perceptual psychology, neuropsychology, biological psychology, evolutionary psychology, historical psychology, economic psychology, political psychology, and critical psychology. It is important to acknowledge that these fields do not discount empiricism, but rather explore new ideas with a theoretical approach first.

== Pioneers ==
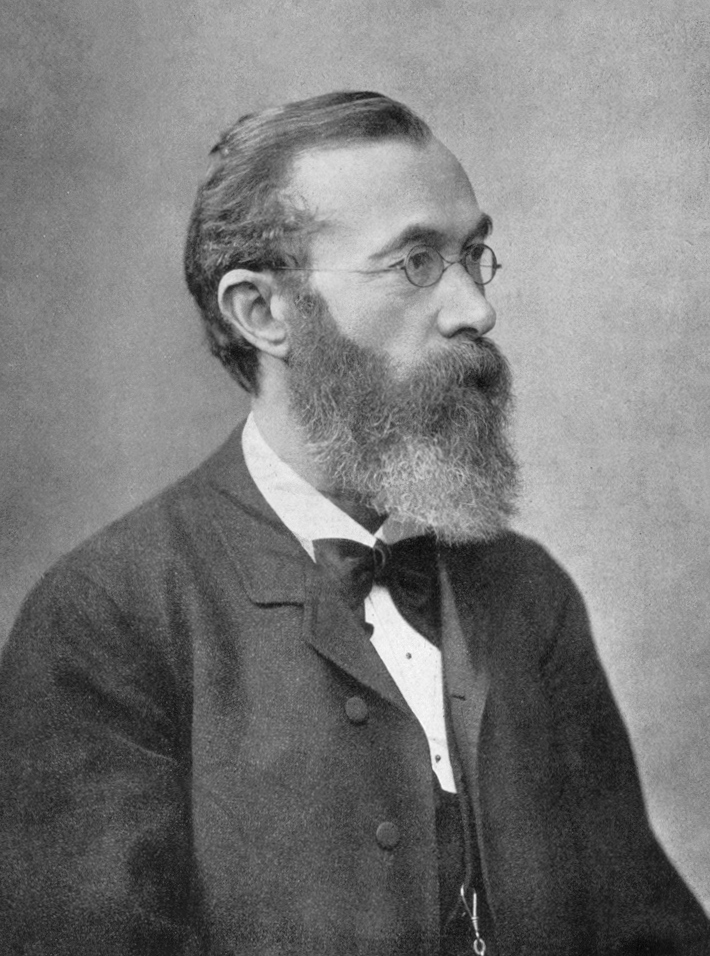
Wilhelm Wundt in 1902

A brief history into the field of theoretical psychology includes some prominent pioneers. To begin, Wilhelm Wundt (1874) originally worked as a professor of philosophy. His focus was on the subjective study of an individual's consciousness, he believed that this was a key factor to the field of psychology. This aspect of psychology was unable to be shown with a large amount of empirical evidence, but remained a theory throughout the history of Psychology. Next, William James (1890) worked as a psychologist and a philosopher. His career focused around the idea of free will, which is theoretical in nature. He also assisted in forming the James-Lange theory of emotion, which is based upon many theoretical factors. Sigmund Freud (1905) was also an important pioneer for theoretical psychology. Freud founded the psychoanalytic theory of psychology. He did not rely on empirical data when making his theories, but instead looked for philosophical explanations. Freud often shared his view that he did not need empirical evidence for his theory, because he simply knew it is true. Another pioneer was John B. Watson (1913). Watson founded the theory of behaviorism in psychology through the article "Psychology as a Behaviorist Views It". Although Behaviorism has a strong emphasis on empirical psychology, forming the methods cannot be empirically tested, and is therefore considered theoretical psychology.

== Notable contributors ==
There are some notable individuals that have, and continue to make a large impact on theoretical psychology. Jerome Kagan's (1971) work on personality traits and aging, emotion, and temperament could be considered theoretical psychology due to Kagen dedicating much of his work to psychology constructs, specifically to the developmental psychology. As a science gains new empirical procedures it also generates new information. Donald Meichenbaum (1977) had work that focused on cognitive behavioral therapy. Meichenbaum did the majority of his work in the field of cognitive psychology. He compared his theory to Pandora's box. Its main focus is connecting cognitive processes and relations to things such as clients' feelings, behavior, and consequences of these. It also factors in physiologic and social cultural processes. Alan E. Kazdin (1980) had theories that focuses on Cognitive Behavioral Therapy as a style in children and adolescence. He focuses on child and adolescent psychopathologies such as depression and conduct problems. His writings on research strategies and methods have set a high standard for rigor in the field. Robert Sternberg's (1990) main focus revolves around some theoretical idea that include; creativity, wisdom, thinking styles, love, and hate. Sternberg often includes politically charged articles that focus on admissions testing and general intelligence. He performed both empirically driven and theoretical work. Kenneth J. Gergen's (1991) work on social psychology as history was used towards generative theories, realities and relationships, the saturated self, positive aging, and relational being. He included many theoretical ideas such as culture and science, assumptions, views on mental illness, and relations. Many of his idea's were theoretical in nature. Ulric Neisser (1995) has work that's related to cognitive psychology, specifically the idea of flashbulb memories. Although he used empirical data to test this idea, he originally took the concept from theoretical work. These individual's and many others continue to impact psychology with theoretical ideas that may or may not be yet supported by empirical data.

== Modern organizational support ==
The American Psychological Association has the division of Theoretical and Philosophical Psychology as Division 24. Theoretical Ideas are also associated to the division of humanistic psychology (32). According to the American Psychological Association, "Division 24: Society for Theoretical and Philosophical Psychology encourages and facilitates informed exploration and discussion of psychological theories and issues in both their scientific and philosophical dimensions and interrelationships." The International Society for Theoretical Psychology, the Section of History and Philosophy of Psychology (25) of the Canadian Psychological Society, the Section of History and Philosophy of psychology of the British Psychological Society, the International Human Science Conference, and the Society for Philosophy and Psychology also offer organizational support. Universities that currently have Theoretical Psychology/Human Science programs include Duquesne University, the University of Dallas, Seattle University, West Georgia College, University of Calgary, University of Alberta, York University, Brigham Young University, University of Notre Dame and Georgetown University.

== Research methods ==
Theoretical psychology works together with empirical psychology to form a symbiotic relationship. Theoretical psychology is not constrained by empirical research or laboratory studies. It allows for scientists to freely search for knowledge that we have yet to be able to study empirically or are not yet capable of studying empirically. For theoretical psychology, its strength lies in the realm of rationality, focused on big picture ideas. However, on its own it is not a complete way to gain particular knowledge of reality. This is where the empirical based branches of psychology has strength. Theoretical psychology can more heavily rely on an idea about human nature that is universal, even when it is not known why or how this particular trend happens in the world, either individualistically or collectively. Empirical psychology is what allows for humans to make insights on these big picture ideas at a more palatable, applicable and individualistic and way that gives practical information about reality. Theoretical psychology is not a universal psychological theory able to explain all topics without the use of empirical research. Theoretical psychology is not fundamental or comprehensive theory of psychology, rather, for theoretical psychology to operate correctly it is important to supplement empirical psychology and give reason to topics and produce theories until they can be empirically verified by the other branches of psychology.

== Issues in methodology and practice ==
Humans have innate wonder, exploring many topics through experience and perception. From this wonder, individuals rationally reflects on their own experiences about a specific topic. Then the individual practices dialectics, examining what others have said about the topic being explored with the hopes of finding a particular knowledge about the topic. Theoretical psychology serves as the bridge between the philosophical roots of psychology and the present day empirical psychology. This bridge has an emphasis and focus on forming concepts from moments of explicit behavior that are observable, excluding introspective mental events within individual consciousness. Psychological laws are created from these observable behaviors that are derived from one concept that also contain concepts from the individual's environment of internal physiological states. These laws are categorized into causal (statistical) or deterministic/mechanistic (nonstatistical) categories which relate simultaneous parallel traits or predict future from present or past respectively. Then these laws are organized into theories based on connections logically deduced together and open to new laws yet to be discovered or empirically verified. The ultimate and logically possible goal of theoretical psychology is to create an exact and comprehensive psychological theory. However, the concepts that are immediately observable are still abstract and difficult to define even in a basic law in an important solid theory as they relate to no physical object we can make sense of or interact with using our sensorium and empirical approaches. They are not instantiated in the world and in virtue of this they are called theoretical concepts.

== Significance ==
Theoretical psychology has many aspects that can be viewed as positive or negative, which depends on the interpreter. Theoretical psychology can play an important and also unique role in the field such that almost any claim can be reasonably thought of as true if it is theoretically appealing and empirically supported by research. Theorists must be strategic and knowledgeable when shifting through experimental psychology as the field grows. This can be beneficial in the sense that individuals know theorists have made a deliberated effort when analyzing the research surrounding a theory. However, for those who are not familiar with the theoretical psychology surrounding a theory, the abundant amount of information contributing to a theory can be overwhelming. In addition, theories can be extremely resistant to change. As theories compete, and different evidence emerges, prior theories can be extremely difficult to change. This can make it difficult for new theories to gain traction within the field of psychology. This resiliency may in part be due to theories stated in ways that are worded too abstractly, ineffectively, and contradictory at times. One challenge of theoretical psychology is the difficulty to explain consciousness: there are many competing theories revolving around consciousness, and theoretical psychology struggles to fully explain or justify consciousness. Researchers have an extremely difficult time studying it, despite there being an entire field of psychology completely dedicated to consciousness. Theoretical psychology can be extremely beneficial because it brings together scientific ideas and philosophical ideas of psychology. Integrating these ideas contributes to the knowledge of psychology.

== Journals ==
The fields of humanistic and existential, as well as the Social Constructionist perspective of psychology, all have been fundamental to some of the first theoretical ideas as it pertains to modern theoretical psychology. Today, there are many journals that include theoretical articles. These journals include the following:

- Journal of Theoretical and Philosophical Psychology
- Theory and Psychology
- New Ideas in Psychology
- Journal of Humanistic Psychology
- Humanistic Psychology
- Family Process
- Studies in linguistics and Philosophy Official website
- Consciousness and Cognition
- Theoretical Issues in Cognitive Science
- Behavior and Philosophy
- American Psychologist
- International Journal of Personal Construct Psychology
- Annals of Theoretical Psychology Official website
- Psychological Inquiry
- Death and Dying Official website
- Journal of Mind and Behavior
- Philosophical Psychology
