= Preparedness (learning) =

Concept in psychology

In psychology, preparedness is a concept developed to explain why certain associations are learned more readily than others. For example, phobias related to survival, such as snakes, spiders, and heights, are much more common and much easier to induce in the laboratory than other kinds of fears. According to Martin Seligman, this is a result of our evolutionary history. The theory states that organisms which learned to fear environmental threats faster had a survival and reproductive advantage. Consequently, the innate predisposition to fear these threats became an adaptive human trait.

Although extensively studied in relation to fears and phobias, the concept of preparedness has also been used to explain why taste aversions are learned so quickly and efficiently compared with other kinds of classical conditioning.

Preparedness theory developed in response to growing evidence against the behaviourist assumption of equipotentiality, the view that the same principles of learning and conditioning apply equally to all stimuli and responses. Although influential, the theory has attracted debate. Some researchers have proposed that the uneven distribution of fears is a result of cognitive biases in threat expectation instead of inherited predispositions. Reviews of experimental literature have also suggested mixed support for Seligman’s original predictions.

== History and theoretical background ==
In a study by Garcia and Koelling (1966), rats were given water that was simultaneously tasty (saccharin-flavoured) and ‘bright-noisy’ (paired with light and sound), meaning both stimuli were experienced equally. During training, this combined stimulus was paired with an unpleasant outcome, either an electric shock or nausea induced by radiation or toxin exposure. When the taste and audiovisual components were later tested separately, rats that were made nauseous developed a strong aversion to the taste but not to the light and sound. Conversely, the rats that were shocked avoided the light and sound but not the taste. This pattern was amongst the first challenges to the behaviourist assumption that any stimulus could be equally associated with any outcome and instead suggested that organisms are biologically predisposed to associate certain types of cues with certain types of consequences. These findings were originally rejected by several journals; however, their successful replication by other researchers helped overcome this initial resistance.

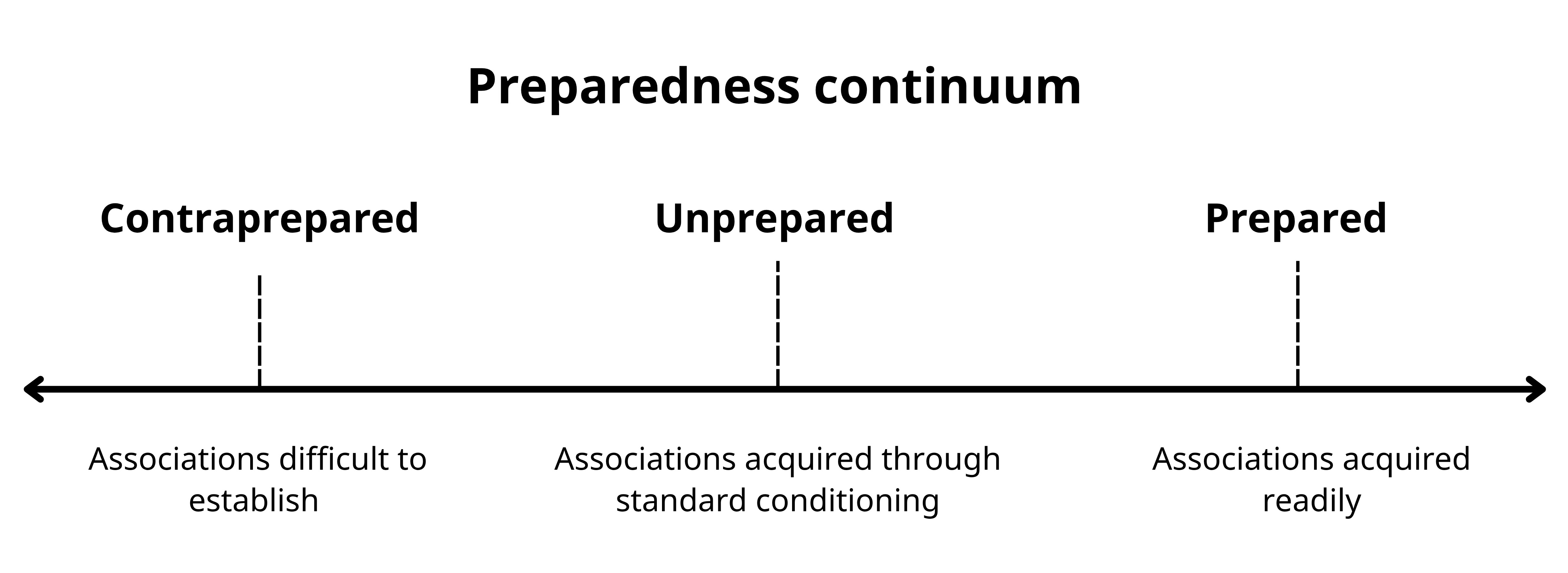
Diagram illustrating Seligman's preparedness continuum.

Seligman (1971) proposed that the ease with which associations are learned falls along a continuum. At one end, ‘prepared’ associations are acquired rapidly with very little input, sometimes in a single trial, are highly resistant to extinction (the fading of a learned response once reinforcement stops) and are difficult to override through reasoning alone. At the other end, ‘contraprepared’ associations are very difficult to establish, even with many repeated pairings. Standard laboratory conditioning that requires multiple trials is considered ‘unprepared’ learning, which falls in the middle of the continuum. Seligman applied this model to explain the uneven distribution of human phobias across all potentially dangerous objects; fears of snakes, spiders and heights are significantly more prevalent than fears of electrical outlets or hammers, despite the latter being more frequently associated with injury in modern life. He argued that common phobias are non-arbitrary and comprise objects and situations related to threats faced throughout human evolutionary history.

Taste aversion learning illustrates several properties of prepared associations. It can be acquired after a single pairing of a novel taste with a subsequent illness, remains effective even when the delay between ingestion and sickness extends to several hours and is highly resistant to extinction once established.

== Experimental evidence ==
Beginning in the mid-1970s, Arne Öhman and colleagues conducted a series of classical conditioning experiments to test whether some stimuli were easier to condition as fear cues than others. Fear-relevant photographs such as of snakes and spiders were used as conditioned stimuli and fear-irrelevant photographs such as of flowers and mushrooms were used as controls. Both were paired with an aversive electric shock. After the shock was discontinued, participants continued to show strong physiological fear responses to the fear-relevant images; however, responses to the fear-irrelevant images extinguished rapidly. In later experiments, Öhman and Soares demonstrated that conditioned fear responses to fear-relevant stimuli could be elicited even when the images were flashed too briefly for the participants to consciously recognise them, suggesting that fear learning may operate automatically and not require the conscious recognition of a stimulus.

Cook and Mineka (1990) tested whether preparedness constrains observational learning and direct conditioning. Laboratory-reared rhesus monkeys with no prior exposure to snakes watched videotapes of other monkeys reacting fearfully. Observers who saw models reacting fearfully to toy snakes but not to artificial flowers acquired a fear of snakes. However, observers who saw the same fearful behaviour directed at flowers instead of snakes did not acquire a fear of either stimulus. This selective pattern of fear acquired observationally for snakes but not for flowers, despite identical model behaviour, provided cross-species evidence that biological preparedness constrains what can be learned through social observation as well as direct experience.

Öhman and Mineka (2001) proposed an evolved fear module. They described it as a relatively independent system that is more readily activated in aversive contexts by stimuli associated with ancestral threats. In their account, its activation is automatic, it is difficult to override through cognitive control and it originates in dedicated neural circuitry centred on the amygdala, a brain region involved in processing threats. This model proposed that natural selection resulted in a dedicated system for rapidly detecting and responding to recurring dangers in ancestral environments. Öhman and Mineka argued that the model’s encapsulation is consistent with features of clinical phobias in that the sufferer recognises the fear as excessive or unreasonable, yet the response remains difficult to control through conscious cognition.

== Criticisms and alternative accounts ==
Not all of the theory’s predictions have been confirmed. Reviewing the experimental literature, McNally (2016) described the evidence as mixed, with the resistance-to-extinction finding from Öhman’s conditioning programme being inconsistently replicated across studies. Referencing earlier critiques, he observed that the most consistently replicated effect may be better understood as an enhanced ability to distinguish between fear-relevant and fear-irrelevant stimuli instead of a general slowing of extinction itself. Nevertheless, McNally argued that Seligman’s preparedness theory had been a productive influence on fear research, inspiring new lines of investigation decades later.

Davey (1995) suggested that phobias may arise from cognitive expectancy bias instead of inherited associative predispositions, arguing that prior knowledge and culturally transmitted information lead people to expect that certain stimuli will be followed by aversive outcomes, thus generating and maintaining persistent learned fear associations. Non-associative accounts have also been proposed by other researchers, according to which some fears may emerge developmentally in the absence of any conditioning experience. Preparedness theory has been interpreted as an ultimate explanation for why certain fear biases may have evolved, whereas cognitive accounts such as Davey’s concern the proximate mechanisms through which such fears are acquired and maintained.
