= The Journal of Psychology =

The Journal of Psychology: Interdisciplinary and Applied
- Discipline: Psychology
- Language: English

Publication details
- History: 1935 to present
- Publisher: Taylor & Francis formerly Heldref Publications (United States)
- Frequency: Bimonthly

Standard abbreviations
- ISO 4: J. Psychol.

Indexing
- ISSN: 0022-3980
- OCLC no.: 1782317

Links
- Journal homepage; Online archive

The Journal of Psychology: Interdisciplinary and Applied is a bimonthly double-blind, peer-review psychology journal published by Taylor & Francis. The Journal of Psychology was founded in 1935 by Carl Murchison, an American psychologist, organizer, publisher, and editor. He co-founded The Journal of Genetic Psychology, The Journal of Social Psychology, and The Journal of General Psychology, among others. In 2009, Heldref sold the ownership of the titles to Taylor & Francis.

The Journal of Psychology is an interdisciplinary journal that publishes empirical research and theoretical articles in applied areas of psychology including clinical, counseling, measurement/assessment, school, educational, industrial, and personnel psychology. In addition, the journal publishes interdisciplinary research that integrates psychology and other fields (e.g., psychology and law, psychology and consumer behavior, psychology and religion).

With the transfer of ownership, The Journal of Psychology is headquartered in Philadelphia.

== Abstracting and indexing ==
The Journal of Psychology is abstracted and indexed in PsycINFO, Scopus, and FRANCIS.
