= Huang Yi (psychologist) =

Chinese child psychologist (1903–1944)

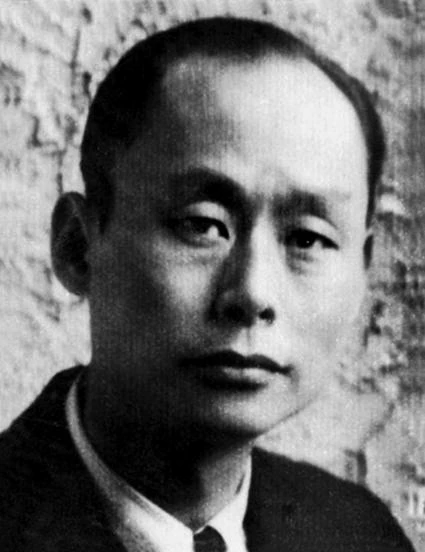
- Born: November 8, 1903; Xiamen, Fujian, Qing China
- Died: October 18, 1944 (aged 40); Zunyi, Guizhou, Republic of China

Academic background
- Education: Tsinghua University, Stanford University, Yale University (PhD)

Academic work
- Discipline: Psychologist
- Sub-discipline: Child psychologist
- Institutions: Zhejiang University

Huang Yi
- Chinese: 黄翼
Transcriptions
Standard Mandarin
- Hanyu Pinyin: Huáng Yì
- Wade–Giles: Huang² I⁴

Huang Yi (November 8, 1903 – October 18, 1944) was a Chinese child psychologist. After study at Tsinghua University and Stanford University, he pursued his doctorate at Yale, where he obtained his PhD in 1930 under the supervision of Arnold Gesell. Returning to China, he focused on child psychology. His research was affected by poverty and the Second Sino-Japanese War, and he died of cancer in 1944. His wartime findings were published posthumously in the American Journal of General Psychology.

== Biography ==
Huang Yi was born in Xiamen, Fujian, on 8 November 1903. Graduating from Tsinghua University in 1924, he traveled to the United States, where he studied psychology at Stanford. Upon receiving his master's degree in 1928, he pursued a PhD in child psychology at Yale University under pediatrician Arnold Gesell. While at Yale, he also worked alongside Smith College psychologist Kurt Koffka. Huang received his doctorate for his dissertation Children’s Explanations of Strange Phenomena in 1930.

After completing his PhD, Huang returned to China and became a professor at Zhejiang University in Hangzhou, where he founded the university's psychology laboratory. He promoted theories of early childhood education strongly inspired by his American contemporaries. In 1937, he published Psychological Understandings of Children’s Drawings. Published by Commercial Press, the book analyzes drawings by children from Henghe Elementary School in early 1936. Huang lays out a schema for the evolution of children's drawings over time, from an initial "scribbling period" to maturity.

Huang's research was severely impacted by poverty and the outbreak of the Second Sino-Japanese War. He was diagnosed with cancer, further impeding his work. Despite this, he continued to conduct psychology research. He tried to publish his findings in 1941, but was blocked by Academia Sinica psychologist Wang Jingxi, who criticized Huang's writing and dismissed the paper as largely repeating existing findings. Huang again attempted to publish his work in 1943 under a different state-run journal, but it was again reviewed and rejected by Wang. Stressing that replicating existing studies was valuable, and that further research possibilities were limited during the war, he appealed to his former classmate Siegen K. Chou to mediate. Chou wrote in favor of Huang, and both academic outlets offered to publish his papers; however, Huang rejected them and instead submitted his findings to the American Journal of General Psychology. Huang died in Zunyi, Guizhou, on 18 October 1944, before his articles were published. They were accepted into the journal by his former professor, Gesell.

== Notable Acheivements ==
Recognizing the method of discipline, XunYu, played a role mental health problem within students in the Republic of China, I. Huang decided to transform this ideology, in which his research splits into two ideas. One was sought through questionnaires and case studies, he was able to identify the guiding ideas behind the traditional discipline and identified it as social standards weren’t accommodating to those outside of them, resulting in discipline to students who were not shy, dependendent, or introverted. The other idea was based on contending the discipline practice with raising concern for children’s psychological well-being and their character development, and that they should be paid more attention to when dealing with children’s disturbing behaviors. Addressing and giving attention to their future development should overcast the focus on their past behaviors.

Through application of child guidance and the scientific nature of it, Huang had been able to establish an experimental nursery school in Hangzhou (1935-1937), in which he was able to use moral education and mental health service to emphasize healthier child guidance methods. The aim of the nursery school was to improve mental health of children from 2.5-4.5, and through his nursery school, children who had developed maladjusted behaviors were given individually tailored treatment along with normal students receiving adequate attention. It is due to Huang Yi’s research and practice of child guidance that he was able to expound on psychological research and practice in China.

== Works ==
Huang dedicated much of his research to examining behaviors within children. In one paper, he wrote a critical summary on Jean Piaget’s idea of children’s conception of physical causality. He reviewed individual studies which included the works of Piaget’s Thesis, Child Biographer’s overall understanding of the subject, and researchers such as Carla Raspe, Elli Hernfeld & Kate Wolf, Karl Zeininger, himself, Susan Isaacs, and many more. The conclusion of summarizing these different works and its reflection on Piaget’s theory of preschool age children thinking to be all animism and mysticism was something that couldn’t exist. This was because the simple physical concepts were comparable to that of an average person found on the street, and that children had established an understanding of physical concepts and explanations for phenomenon they were not aware of. It should be noted as well that Huang himself also contributed to some studies that he reviewed and its reflection on Piaget’s theory.
