= European Journal of Psychology Open =

- Discipline: Psychology
- Language: English

Publication details
- History: 2021-present
- Publisher: Hogrefe Publishing Group
- Frequency: Quarterly
- Open access: Yes
- License: CC BY 4.0
- Impact factor: 1.7 (2023)

Standard abbreviations
- ISO 4: Eur. J. Psychol. Open

Indexing
- ISSN: 2673-8627
- OCLC no.: 1302642880

Links
- Journal homepage; Online access; Online archive

The European Journal of Psychology Open is an open access peer-reviewed academic journal of psychology and is the official journal of the European Federation of Psychologists' Associations.

== History ==
The journal was established in 2021 as a continuation of the Swiss Journal of Psychology.

== Abstracting and indexing ==
The journal is abstracted and indexed in:

- Directory of Open Access Journals
- EBSCO databases
- Mir@bel
- PsycINFO
- Scopus
- Social Sciences Citation Index

According to the Journal Citation Reports, the journal has a 2023 impact factor of 1.7.
