= Koneru =

Koneru (Telugu: కోనేరు) is a Telugu surname. It may refer to:

- Koneru Humpy (born 1987), chess grandmaster from India
- Koneru Ramakrishna Rao (born 1932), Indian educator and administrator
- Koneru Ranga Rao (1936–2010), Indian politician of the Congress party
- Koneru Lakshmaiah College of Engineering, an engineering college in Andhra Pradesh, India
- Koneru Nageswara Rao (1937–2016), Indian politician of the Telugu Desam Party
