= Aviation psychology =

Branch of psychology

Aviation psychology, also known as aerospace psychology, is a branch of psychology that studies psychological aspects of aviation, increasing efficiency improving selection of applicants for occupations, identification of psychological causes of aircraft accidents, and application of cognitive psychology to understand human behaviors, actions, cognitive and emotional processes in aviation, and interaction between employees. Aviation psychology originated at the beginning of the 1920s with the development of aviation medicine and work psychology in the USSR. Human separation from earth leads to a drastic change in spatial orientation; accelerations, drops in barometric pressure, changes in atmospheric composition, can have a substantial effect on the nervous system, and requires uninterrupted concentration and rapid decisions. Currently, research in aviation psychology develops within the framework of engineering psychology.

== Publications ==
The International Journal of Aerospace Psychology is a quarterly peer-reviewed academic journal covering research on the "development and management of efficient aviation systems from the standpoint of the human operators." It integrates disciplines of engineering and computer science, psychology, education, and physiology. published by Taylor and Francis, edited by the Association of Aviation Psychology.

Aviation Psychology and Applied Human Factors is the journal of the European Association for Aviation Psychology (EAAP) and the Australian Aviation Psychology Association (AAvPA). Two issues per year are published by Hogrefe.

== See also ==
- Applied psychology
- Pilot decision making
- SHELL model
