= NAOP =

NAOP may stand for:

- National Academy of Psychology, Indian professional organisation
- National Association of Operative Plasterers, former British trade union
