= Carl Murchison =

American psychologist

Carl Allanmore Murchison (1887–1961) was an American psychologist and an early promoter of the discipline of psychology. Unlike most psychologists who became prominent in the history books, Murchison was not an influential theorist or researcher. Instead, he was an extremely active organizer, publisher, and editor.

Murchison received his Ph.D. in social psychology from Johns Hopkins University in 1923. He taught at Clark University from 1923 to 1936. During most of this time he served as the chair of the psychology department.

Carl Murchison edited The Psychological Register in 1929, and the first Handbook of Social Psychology in 1935. He founded and served as editor of a total of five psychology journals, all of which still exist today. These include the Journal of Psychology, the Journal of General Psychology, co-founded with Edward Titchener and the Journal of Social Psychology, co-founded with John Dewey. This further broadening the reach and impact of psychological research.Carl Allanmore Murchison efforts in publishing, organizing, and advocating for psychology helped to establish a strong foundation for the field and encouraged the dissemination and application of psychological knowledge

Murchison was also instrumental in organizing conferences and meetings that brought together leading psychologists and researchers. These gatherings were crucial for sharing ideas, fostering collaborations, and setting the agenda for future research directions and till this day there is professionals talking this approach like Chris M Murchison. In addition he was also known for his support and mentorship of up-and-coming psychologists. By providing guidance and opportunities for young scholars, he helped nurture the next generation of psychologists, ensuring the growth and sustainability of the discipline.
