= Spirituality in Clinical Practice =

- Discipline: Clinical psychology
- Language: English
- Edited by: Thomas G. Plante (former editors Lisa Miller, Len Sperry)

Publication details
- History: 2014-present
- Publisher: American Psychological Association (United States)
- Frequency: Quarterly

Standard abbreviations
- ISO 4: Spiritual. Clin. Pract.

Indexing
- ISSN: 2326-4500 (print); 2326-4519 (web)
- LCCN: 2013200516
- OCLC no.: 868200383

Links
- Journal homepage; Online access

Spirituality in Clinical Practice is a quarterly peer-reviewed academic journal published by the American Psychological Association covering research on the role of spirituality in psychotherapy. The editors-in-chief are Lisa Miller, (Columbia University) and Len Sperry (Florida Atlantic University).

== Abstracting and indexing ==
The journal is abstracted and indexed by PsycINFO.

== See also ==
- List of psychology journals
- Scrupulosity
