= Experimental Psychology (journal) =

- Discipline: Experimental psychology
- Language: English
- Edited by: Christoph Stahl

Publication details
- Former names: Zeitschrift für Experimentelle und Angewandte Psychologie; Zeitschrift für Experimentelle Psychologie
- History: 1953-present
- Publisher: Hogrefe Publishing Group
- Frequency: Quarterly
- Impact factor: 1.829 (2016)

Standard abbreviations
- ISO 4: Exp. Psychol.

Indexing
- ISSN: 1618-3169 (print); 2190-5142 (web)
- LCCN: 2002243131
- OCLC no.: 960785931

Links
- Journal homepage; Online access; Online archive

Experimental Psychology is a quarterly peer-reviewed scientific journal covering research on experimental psychology. It was established in 1953 as Zeitschrift für Experimentelle und Angewandte Psychologie, and was renamed Zeitschrift fur Experimentelle Psychologie in 1995. In 2001, it was renamed to its current name. It is published by Hogrefe Publishing Group and the editor-in-chief is Christoph Stahl (University of Cologne). According to the Journal Citation Reports, the journal has a 2016 impact factor of 1.829.
