= Graham Davey =

British psychologist and academic

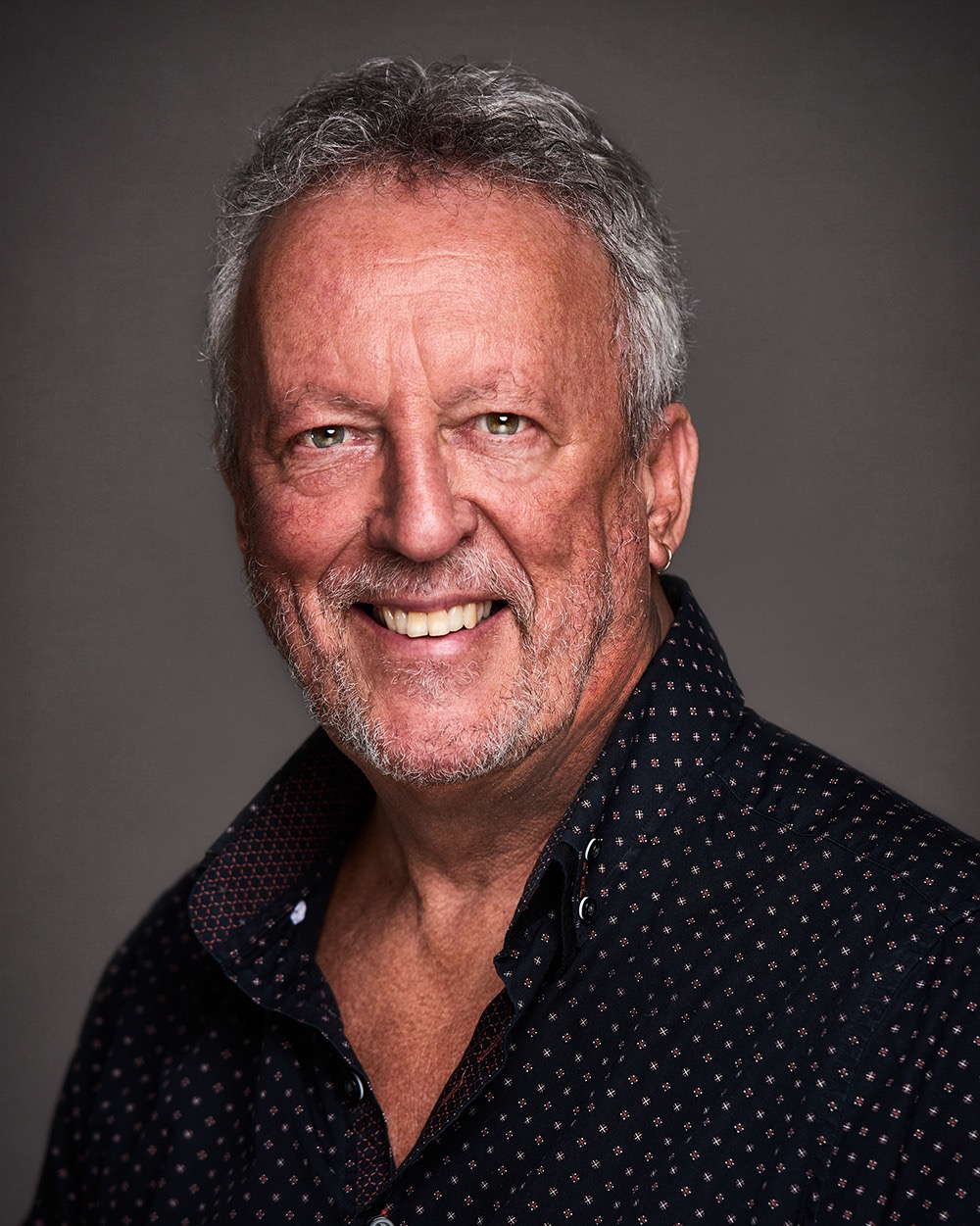
- Occupations: Psychologist and an academic

Academic background
- Education: B.A., Psychology; Ph.D., Psychology
- Alma mater: University of Wales

Academic work
- Institutions: University of Sussex

Graham Davey is a British psychologist and an academic. He is emeritus professor of psychology at the University of Sussex.

Davey's research interests include anxiety disorders and experimental psychopathology, with a focus on conditioning models of fear and anxiety, pathological worrying and obsessive-compulsive checking, perseverative psychopathologies, the role of the disgust emotion in psychological disorders, and embodied emotion. He has written and edited books such as Clinical Psychology, Applied Psychology, Psychopathology: Research, Assessment & Treatment in Clinical Psychology, and Phobias: A Handbook of Theory, Research & Treatment.

Davey is the former president of British Psychological Society.

== Education ==
Davey completed his early education from Hinckley Grammar School, Leicestershire and Hastings High School, Burbage. He went on to earn a B.A. in Psychology from the University of Wales at Bangor in 1971 and in 1975, completed a Ph.D. in Psychology from the same institution.

== Career ==
In 1976, Davey joined The City University in London as a lecturer in psychology, and in 1991, was promoted to professor of psychology at The City University. He was then appointed professor of psychology at the University of Sussex, where he remained from 1994 to 2016. Since 2016, he has been an emeritus professor of psychology at the University of Sussex.

At The City University, he was chair of the Psychology Division from 1988 to 1991. At the University of Sussex, he was subject chair for the Psychology Group in the School of Cognitive & Computing Sciences from 1994 to 2002. He was the founding editor-in-chief of the Journal of Experimental Psychopathology.

From 2002 to 2003, Davey served as president of the British Psychological Society, Subsequently, in 2005, he was appointed chair of the Society's Publications & Communications Board.

== Research ==
Davey's research on anxiety disorders has investigated the factors that lead some anxious people to become pathological worriers. He defined the psychological characteristics which are specific to the worrying process and are independent of other psychopathological processes such as anxiety. The characteristics he identified that can lead to pathological worrying included abortive problem-solving and information seeking, vacillatory worrying, and catastrophic worrying. He also investigated if worrying is related to poor problem-solving abilities and established that pathological worrying is not generated by poor problem-solving skills per se, but by an individual's lack of confidence in their problem-solving abilities. He also explored the beliefs that people have about the consequences of worrying and grouped these into five categories, representing two positive and three negative consequences. The negative consequences related to worry disrupting effective performance, worry exaggerating the problem, and worry causing emotional distress, whereas the positive consequences related to the motivational influence of worry and worry helping analytical thinking.

Davey has also helped to develop the mood-as-input model of perseverative psychopathologies such as OCD checking and perseverative worrying. His work demonstrated that people who develop such compulsive conditions tend to use their mood as information about whether they have achieved the goals of their checking and worrying, but they interpret their negative mood (usually anxiety) as information that they have not achieved those goals and that is one reason why they persist with their checking and worrying.

Davey was also involved in developing the disease avoidance view of common animal fears and identified the relationship between disgust sensitivity (an emotion whose function is to help avoid disease, illness, and pathogens) and fear of a variety of animals. Based on this theoretical view, he suggested that common, non-clinical animal fears may be closely associated with the human disgust reaction and that relationship may explain why many small, non-predatory animals are some of the most feared animals worldwide. Furthermore, he also explored the prominence of animal phobias in different cultures and found that there is consistency, rather than diversity, in the categories of animals that evoke disgust across different cultures. He has argued that the association of some animals such as rats and spiders with the spread of disease, plagues and epidemics across Europe in the Middle Ages is the main cause of pervasive fear of such animals in many modern Western societies. In related research, he also identified conditioning processes that are relevant to humans and demonstrated their potential in providing a model of fears and phobias.

== Bibliography ==
=== Selected books ===
- Davey, Graham (1981). Animal learning and conditioning. London: Macmillan. ISBN 978-0333217306.
- Davey, Graham C., ed. (1997). Phobias: a handbook of theory, research, and treatment. New York: Wiley. ISBN 978-0471969839.
- Davey, Graham (2017). Applications of Conditioning Theory (1st ed.). Taylor and Francis. ISBN 978-1138574854.
- Davey, Graham (2017). Complete Psychology (2 ed.). Routledge. ISBN 978-1138436732.
- Davey, Graham (2018). Ecological Learning Theory (Psychology Library Editions: Comparative Psychology). Routledge. ISBN 978-1138554863.
- Davey, Graham (2018). The anxiety epidemic: the causes of our modern-day anxieties. London: Robinson. ISBN 978-1472140968.
- Davey, Graham C., ed. (2019). Psychology. Chichester, West Sussex: Wiley. ISBN 978-1119465799.
- Davey, Graham C.L., ed. (2019). Clinical psychology. Los Angeles London New Dehli Singapore Washington DC Melbourne: SAGE. ISBN 978-1526428127.
- Davey, Graham (2021). Psychopathology: research, assessment and treatment in clinical psychology (Third ed.). Hoboken, NJ: Wiley-BPS Blackwell. ISBN 978-1119679189.
- Davey, Graham (2023). The Catastrophic Worrier: Why You Worry and How to Stop. ReadHowYouWant. ISBN 978-0369397218.

=== Selected articles ===
- Matchett, G.; Davey, G. C. (1991). "A test of a disease-avoidance model of animal phobias". Behaviour Research and Therapy. 29 (1): 91–94. doi:10.1016/s0005-7967(09)80011-9. ISSN 0005-7967. PMID 2012593.
- Davey, Graham C. L.; Hampton, James; Farrell, Jola; Davidson, Sue (1 February 1992). "Some characteristics of worrying: Evidence for worrying and anxiety as separate constructs". Personality and Individual Differences. 13 (2): 133–147. doi:10.1016/0191-8869(92)90036-O. ISSN 0191-8869.
- Davey, Graham C. L. (1 January 1993). "A comparison of three worry questionnaires". Behaviour Research and Therapy. 31 (1): 51–56. doi:10.1016/0005-7967(93)90042-S. ISSN 0005-7967. PMID 8417728.
- Davey, Graham C. L. (1 March 1994). "Worrying, social problem-solving abilities, and social problem-solving confidence". Behaviour Research and Therapy. 32 (3): 327–330. doi:10.1016/0005-7967(94)90130-9. ISSN 0005-7967. PMID 8192632.
- van Overveld, W. J. M.; de Jong, P. J.; Peters, M. L.; Cavanagh, K.; Davey, G. C. L. (1 November 2006). "Disgust propensity and disgust sensitivity: Separate constructs that are differentially related to specific fears". Personality and Individual Differences. 41 (7): 1241–1252. doi:10.1016/j.paid.2006.04.021. ISSN 0191-8869.
