= Girishwar Misra =

Indian psychologist and author (born 1951)

- Born: 21 April 1951 (age 75); Gorakhpur, Uttar Pradesh, India
- Education: M.A., Ph.D. in Psychology
- Alma mater: Gorakhpur University
- Occupations: Educator, Psychologist, Social Scientist, Writer, Editor and Currently vice chancellor, Mahatma Gandhi Antarrashtriya Hindi Vishwavidyalaya
- Writing career
- Notable works: Psychology and Societal Development: Paradigmatic and Social Concerns
- Notable awards: National award in the field of social science for the year 2009, Govt. of Madhya Pradesh, India

Girishwar Misra (born 21 April 1951) is a social scientist, psychologist and author from India.

== Early life ==
He obtained an M.A. and Ph.D. in psychology from Gorakhpur University. He started his career as lecturer in psychology at lecturer, Gorakhpur University in 1970. Thereafter he remained reader at Allahabad University (1979–1983), professor, Bhopal University (1983–1993), before joining as professor, Delhi University in 1993, where he served for the rest of his career.

In 1991–1992, Misra was a Fulbright Fellow in the United States at Swarthmore College and at the University of Michigan.

He was the vice chancellor of Mahatma Gandhi Antarrashtriya Hindi Vishwavidyalaya in Wardha, Maharashtra, India.

Professor Misra is the chief editor of the fifth ICSSR Survey of Psychology published by Indian Council of Social Science Research (ICSSR). For 15 years, until the end of 2015, he was editor of Psychological Studies, a journal of the National Academy of Psychology, India. As of 2016, he was continuing as the special issue editor of Psychological Studies.

He has been one of the leaders of the emerging field of Indian psychology.

== Award ==
National award in the field of social science for the year 2009, Govt. of Madhya Pradesh, India

== Works in English ==
- Psychological Consequences of Prolonged Deprivation (with L. B. Tripathi)
- Deprivation: Its Social Roots and Psychological Consequences (with D. Sinha and R. C. Tripathi)
- Perspectives on Indigenous Psychology (with A. K. Mohanty)
- Psychological Perspectives on Health and Stress, Psychology of Poverty and Social Disadvantage (with A. K. Mohanty)
- Applied Social Psychology in India, New Directions in Indian Psychology, Vol. 1: Social Psychology (with A. K. Dalal)
- Towards a Culturally Relevant Psychology (with J. Prakash)
- Rethinking Intelligence (with A. K. Srivastava)
- Psychology and Societal Development: Paradigmatic and Social Concerns
- Psychology for India

== Works in Hindi ==
- Bal apradh
- Taki usaka Bachapan vapas mil sake
- Ek vikas shil desh main manovigyan: Bhartiya anubhava (Hindi Translation of D. Sinha’s book entitled "Psychology in a third world country
- Mangal Prabhat ki Pratiksha me
