= Behavioral Science & Policy =

Behavioral Science & Policy is a dual peer-reviewed academic journal. It is a joint publication of the Behavioral Science and Policy Association and the Brookings Institution Press. The journal was first published in 2015; the founding co-editors are Craig R. Fox (University of California, Los Angeles) and Sim B Sitkin (Duke University).

== Scope ==
The journal is primarily aimed at public, private and government sector policymakers, and articles must demonstrate both the empirical basis and the specific implications for policy and practice. The journal is dual-reviewed by a policy editor and an editor for the specific disciplinary field; they are then sent to outside referees, and, if accepted, professionally edited to ensure accessibility to scientists, lay readers and policy makers

The journal publishes in the disciplinary domains of behavioral economics, cognitive and brain science, organizational science, social psychology, political science, decision marketing and management sciences, and sociology. Policy areas include financial decision making, education, technology and innovation, health, justice and ethics, management and labor and energy and environment. The current senior policy editor is Carol Graham of the Brookings Institution.

The main journal accepts: proposals (≈2,500 words), reports (≈3,000 words), findings (≈4,000) and reviews (≈5,000 words). It also publishes invitations, or requests from policymakers for contributions from behavioral scientists on a particular policy issue

== Indexing and access ==
Behavioral Science & Policy is abstracted and indexed in SCOPUS, Medline, and Project MUSE. The journal's ISSN is 2379-4607 (print) and ISSN 2379-4615 (online). The accepted articles are available open access until the completion date of an issue; they are subsequently subscription access only.
