= Swiss Journal of Psychology =

- Discipline: Psychology
- Language: English, French, German
- Edited by: Fred Mast

Publication details
- Former name: Schweizerische Zeitschrift für Psychologie
- History: 1942-2020
- Publisher: Verlag Hans Huber (Switzerland)
- Frequency: Quarterly
- Impact factor: 0.774 (2019)

Standard abbreviations
- ISO 4: Swiss J. Psychol.

Indexing
- ISSN: 1421-0185 (print); 1662-0879 (web)
- OCLC no.: 300289865

Links
- Journal homepage; Online archive

The Swiss Journal of Psychology was a peer-reviewed academic journal and the official journal of the Swiss Psychological Society. It was established in 1942 as the Schweizerische Zeitschrift für Psychologie with Jean Piaget as founding editor-in-chief. The journal was published until 2020, after which 2 successor journals, the European Journal of Psychology Open and Swiss Psychology Open, were launched.

== Abstracting and indexing ==
The journal was abstracted and indexed in:

- Current Contents/Social and Behavioral Sciences
- Mir@bel
- PsycINFO
- PsycLIT/Psychological Abstracts
- PSYNDEX
- Scopus
- Social Sciences Citation Index

According to the Journal Citation Reports, the journal has a 2019 impact factor of 0.774.
