= Empirical psychology =

Empirical psychology (German: empirische Psychologie) is the work of a number of nineteenth century German-speaking pioneers of experimental psychology, including William James, Wilhelm Wundt and others. It also includes several philosophical theories of psychology which based themselves on the epistemological standpoint of empiricism, e.g., Franz Brentano's Psychology from an Empirical Standpoint (1874).

== See also ==
- History of psychology
- Cognitive psychology
- Behavioural psychology
