= Journal of Nonverbal Behavior =

- Subject: Nonverbal communication
- Language: English
- Edited by: Leanne ten Brinke

Publication details
- Former names: Environmental Psychology and Nonverbal Behavior
- History: 1976–present
- Publisher: Springer Science+Business Media
- Frequency: Quarterly
- Impact factor: 1.7 (2024)

Standard abbreviations
- ISO 4: J. Nonverbal Behav.

Indexing
- CODEN: JNVBDV
- ISSN: 0191-5886 (print); 1573-3653 (web)
- LCCN: 80640435
- OCLC no.: 299333784

Links
- Journal homepage; Online archive

The Journal of Nonverbal Behavior is a quarterly peer-reviewed psychology journal covering the study of nonverbal communication. Specific topics include paralanguage, proxemics, facial expressions, eye contact, face-to-face interaction, and nonverbal emotional expression, as well as other subjects which contribute to the scientific understanding of nonverbal processes and behavior. It was established in 1976 as Environmental Psychology and Nonverbal Behavior, obtaining its current title in 1979. It is published by Springer Science+Business Media and the editor-in-chief is Leanne ten Brinke (University of British Columbia, Okanagan). According to the Journal Citation Reports, the journal has a 2024 impact factor of 1.7.
