= Adultspan Journal =

- Discipline: Psychotherapy & Counseling
- Language: English
- Edited by: Catherine B. Roland

Publication details
- History: 1999-present
- Publisher: Wiley-Blackwell on behalf of the American Counseling Association
- Frequency: Biannual

Standard abbreviations
- ISO 4: Adultspan J.

Indexing
- ISSN: 1524-6817 (print); 2161-0029 (web)

Links
- Journal homepage; Online access; Online archive

Adultspan Journal is a biannual peer-reviewed academic journal published by Wiley-Blackwell on behalf of the American Counseling Association and the Association for Adult Development and Aging (AADA).

The journal was established in 1999. Its current editor-in-chief is Catherine B. Roland. The journal focuses on research, theory, and practice in the field of adult development and aging on issues that affect people in young, middle, and older adulthood.
