= Japanese Psychological Research =

- Discipline: Psychology
- Language: English
- Edited by: Etsuko T. Harada

Publication details
- History: 1954-present
- Publisher: John Wiley & Sons on behalf of the Japanese Psychological Association (Japan)
- Frequency: Quarterly
- Impact factor: 1.444 (2020)

Standard abbreviations
- ISO 4: Jpn. Psychol. Res.

Indexing
- CODEN: JPREAV
- ISSN: 0021-5368 (print); 1468-5884 (web)
- LCCN: 62005455
- OCLC no.: 809189739

Links
- Journal homepage; Online access; Online archive

Japanese Psychological Research is a quarterly peer-reviewed academic journal covering psychology. It was established in 1954 and is published by John Wiley & Sons on behalf of the Japanese Psychological Association. The editor-in-chief is Etsuko T. Harada (University of Tsukuba). According to the Journal Citation Reports, the journal has a 2020 impact factor of 1.444, ranking it 99th out of 141 journals in the category "Psychology Multidisciplinary".
