= New Ideas in Psychology =

- Discipline: Theoretical psychology
- Language: English
- Edited by: Bipin Indurkhya

Publication details
- History: Since 1983
- Publisher: Elsevier
- Frequency: Quarterly
- Impact factor: 2.9 (2024)

Standard abbreviations
- ISO 4: New Ideas Psychol.

Indexing
- ISSN: 0732-118X (print); 1873-3522 (web)
- LCCN: 83644007
- OCLC no.: 630596752

Links
- Journal homepage; Online archive2

New Ideas in Psychology is a quarterly peer-reviewed academic journal covering theoretical psychology. It was established in 1983 and is published by Elsevier. The editor-in-chief is Bipin Indurkhya (Jagiellonian University). According to the Journal Citation Reports, the journal has a 2024 impact factor of 2.9.
