= International Review of Sport and Exercise Psychology =

- Language: English

Publication details
- Publisher: Routledge
- Frequency: Annual
- Impact factor: 6.4 (2023)

Standard abbreviations
- ISO 4: Int. Rev. Sport Exerc. Psychol.

Indexing
- ISSN: 1750-984X

Links
- Journal homepage

International Review of Sport and Exercise Psychology is a peer-reviewed academic journal published by Routledge.

== Abstracting and indexing ==
The journal is abstracted and indexed in:

- Science Citation Index Expanded
- Scopus
- Social Sciences Citation Index

According to the Journal Citation Reports, the journal has a 2020 impact factor of 20.652.
