= Athletic Insight =

Athletic Insight was established in 1999 to serve as a peer-reviewed, nonproprietary journal that would provide a forum for discussion of topics that are relevant to the field of sport psychology through a quarterly online publication.

It is covered by in the PsycINFO database.
