= Intellectica =

Peer-reviewed academic journal of cognitive science

- Language: English

Publication details
- History: 1985-present
- Frequency: Biannual

Standard abbreviations
- ISO 4: Intellectica

Intellectica is a referenced biannual peer-reviewed academic journal of cognitive science that was established in 1985 by the French Association for Cognitive Research (Association pour la Recherche Cognitive) and published with the aid of the University of Technology of Compiègne.

It is devoted to the publication of theoretical, epistemological, and historic work, shedding light on current debates, in the domain of cognitive science. The published material includes long reflective, critical, and/or prospective articles. These reference articles shall offer an opening to the plurality of approaches within the cognitive science community (anthropology, biology, computer science, linguistics, logic, neuroscience, philosophy, psychology, robotics, etc.). The aim of the journal is thus to explore, in a critical and pluralist perspective, the transdisciplinary project of naturalization of knowledge.

The journal addresses themes such as perception, motricity, language, and reasoning, the forms of intentionality, learning, in both individual and collective modalities, natural or artificial. The scope of the journal includes logical forms, representations of knowledge, neuro-mimetic and dynamic models, and adaptive systems. Applications to domains such as education, ergonomics, human-machine interaction, and machine learning can also be addressed in the articles.

Since its creation, the journal produces essentially biyearly thematic issues, but it also publishes articles proposed in free submission, whether they be original articles, essays, reviews of books, or yet again responses to previously published articles. This editorial policy excludes contributions of a purely empirical nature (whether it be experimental, models, observation, etc...) since such work already has a multitude of journals devoted to such work. The Editorial Committee nevertheless ensures that reflexive work which is presented is in phase with the current empirical state of the field and, if necessary, presents a synthesis in the heart of the article.

The texts which are published can be in English for non-French native speakers, but, there again, the Editorial Committee ensures the linguistic quality of the texts whether they are in French or in English.

== Abstracting and indexing ==
The journal is abstracted and indexed in Linguistics and Language Behavior Abstracts, PsycINFO, and Persée.
