= Psychology in Russia (journal) =

- Discipline: Psychology
- Language: English
- Edited by: Yury P. Zinchenko, Viktor F. Petrenko

Publication details
- History: 2008-present
- Publisher: Russian Psychological Society and Lomonosov Moscow State University's Faculty of Psychology (Russia)
- Frequency: Annually
- Open access: Yes

Standard abbreviations
- ISO 4: Psychol. Russ.

Indexing
- ISSN: 2074-6857
- OCLC no.: 807029501

Links
- Journal homepage; Online archive

Psychology in Russia: State of the Art is an annual peer-reviewed academic journal covering theoretical and empirical research in psychology in Russia. The journal is abstracted and indexed in PsycINFO and Scopus. The editors-in-chief are Yury P. Zinchenko and Viktor F. Petrenko (Moscow State University).
