= The Journal of Social Psychology =

- Discipline: Social psychology
- Language: English
- Edited by: John Edlund; Corey Cook; Andrew Hale; William "Ivey" Mackenzie; Cynthia Willis-Esqueda; Jim Wirth

Publication details
- Former names: The Journal of Social Psychology: Political, Racial and Differential Psychology
- History: 1929–present
- Publisher: Routledge
- Frequency: Bimonthly
- Impact factor: 2.712 (2020)

Standard abbreviations
- ISO 4: J. Soc. Psychol.

Indexing
- ISSN: 0022-4545 (print); 1940-1183 (web)
- LCCN: 33021284
- OCLC no.: 692496513

Links
- Journal homepage; Online access; Online archive

The Journal of Social Psychology is a bimonthly academic journal covering social psychology published by Routledge, who acquired it from Heldref Publications in 2009.

== History ==
The journal was established in 1929 by John Dewey and Carl Murchison. It covers all areas of basic and applied social psychology. The journal was subtitled Political, Racial and Differential Psychology until changing its name in 1949. The Journal incorporated with Genetic, Social, and General Psychology Monographs between 1925–2006

== Contents ==
The Journal of Social Psychology focuses on original empirical research. Most of the articles report laboratory or field research that covers a variety of topics in core areas of social and organizational psychology, including (but not limited to): the self and social identity, person perception and social cognition, attitudes and persuasion, social influence, consumer behavior, decision making, groups and teams, stereotypes and discrimination, interpersonal attraction and relationships, prosocial behavior, aggression, organizational behavior, leadership, and cultural psychology. The journal publishes work from all over the world and aims to improve the integration of contemporary social sciences.

== See also ==
- Social psychology
- Lists of academic journals
- List of psychology journals
- Social psychology (sociology)
