= European Journal of Psychology of Education =

- Discipline: Educational psychology
- Language: English
- Edited by: Aleksandar Baucal

Publication details
- History: 1986–present
- Publisher: Springer Science+Business Media
- Frequency: Quarterly
- Impact factor: 1.483 (2017)

Standard abbreviations
- ISO 4: Eur. J. Psychol. Educ.

Indexing
- ISSN: 0256-2928 (print); 1878-5174 (web)
- OCLC no.: 643917224

Links
- Journal homepage; Online archive

The European Journal of Psychology of Education: A Journal of Education and Development is a quarterly peer-reviewed academic journal covering educational psychology. It was established in 1986 and is published by Springer Science+Business Media. The editor-in-chief is Aleksandar Baucal (University of Belgrade). According to the Journal Citation Reports, the journal has a 2017 impact factor of 1.483.
