= Journal of Work and Organizational Psychology =

Academic journal of psychology

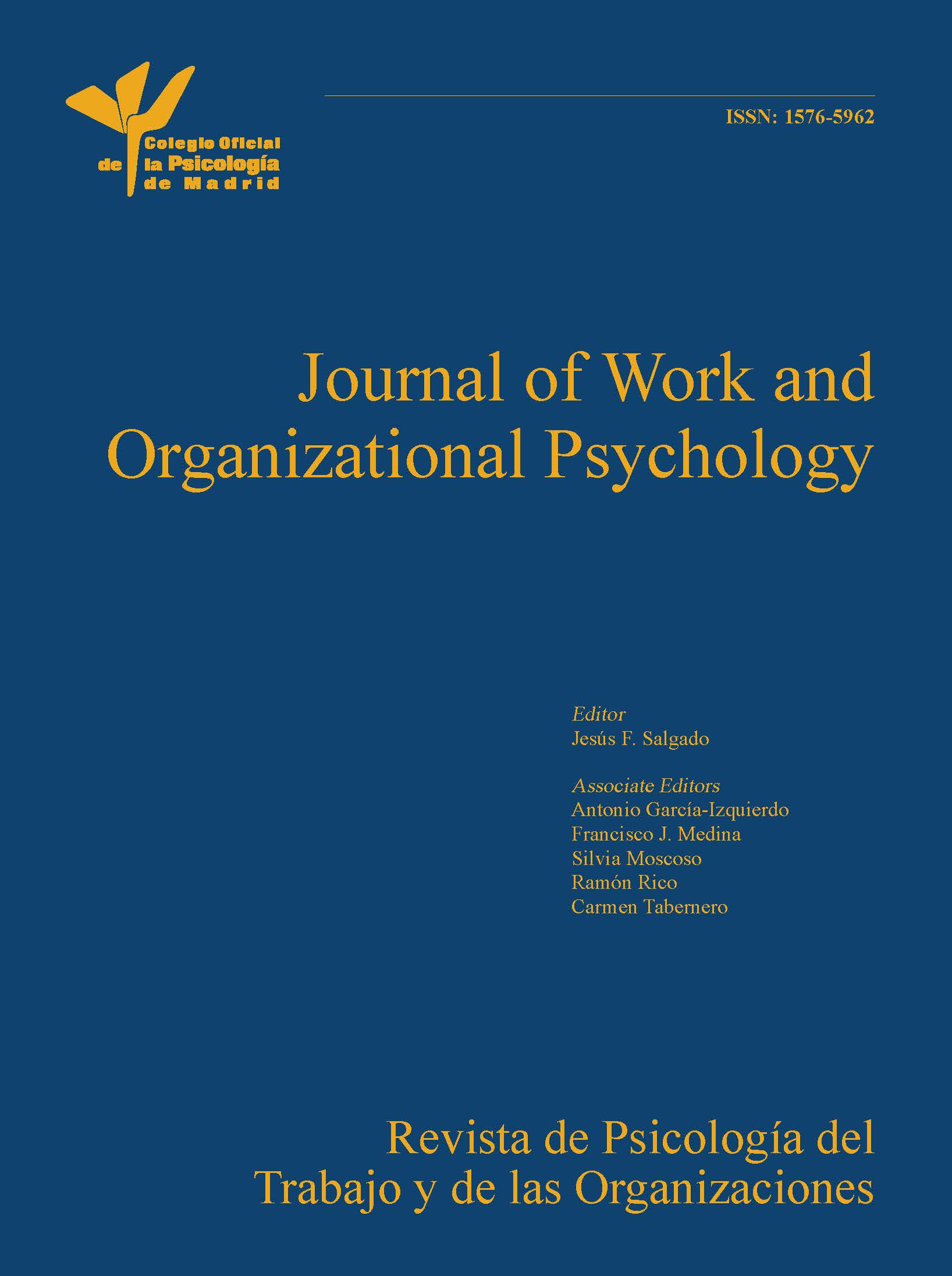
- Discipline: Psychology
- Language: English
- Edited by: Jesús D. Salgado

Publication details
- Former name: Revista de Psicologia del Trabajo y de las Organizaciones
- History: 1985–present
- Publisher: Official Psychology Association of Madrid (Spain)
- Frequency: Triannually
- Open access: Yes
- Impact factor: 4.089 (2021)

Standard abbreviations
- ISO 4: J. Work Organ. Psychol.

Indexing
- ISSN: 1576-5962 (print); 2174-0534 (web)

Links
- Journal homepage

The Journal of Work and Organizational Psychology is a triannual peer-reviewed open access academic journal that covers mainly original research literature of interest for psychologists within the field of work, industrial and organizational psychology, including human resources, organizational behavior, personnel psychology, ergonomics, and human factors.

== History ==
It was on the first National Work Psychology Congress, celebrated in Madrid on 9 April 1983, when Adolfo Hernández, chief of the Official Psychology Association of Madrid, proposed creating the first academic journal dedicated to work and organization psychology in Spain. In March 1984, during the second National Work Psychology Congress, the decision of creating the mentioned academic journal was definitively made. The project was initially supported by Official Psychology Association (Madrid delegation) and the Industrial Section of the Spanish Society of Psychology and officially established in 1985. Nowadays, the journal is exclusively edited by the Official Psychology Association of Madrid and is published in English. The editor-in-chief is Jesús F. Salgado.

== Abstracting and indexing ==
The journal is abstracted and indexed in the Social Sciences Citation Index, and Scopus. According to the Journal Citation Reports, the journal has a 2021 impact factor of 4.089.
