= The International Journal of Aerospace Psychology =

- Discipline: Aviation
- Language: English
- Edited by: Dennis B. Beringer

Publication details
- Former name: The International Journal of Aviation Psychology
- History: 1991–present
- Publisher: Taylor & Francis on behalf of the Association of Aviation Psychology
- Frequency: Quarterly
- Impact factor: 0.167 (2012)

Standard abbreviations
- ISO 4: Int. J. Aerosp. Psychol.

Indexing
- ISSN: 1050-8414 (print); 1532-7108 (web)
- LCCN: 91640751
- OCLC no.: 45007196

Links
- Journal homepage; Online access; Online archive

The International Journal of Aerospace Psychology (formerly The International Journal of Aviation Psychology until 2017) is a quarterly peer-reviewed academic journal covering research on the "development and management of safe, effective aviation systems from the standpoint of the human operators." It draws on aspects of the academic disciplines of engineering and computer science, psychology, education, and physiology. It was established in 1991 and is published by Taylor and Francis on behalf of the Association of Aviation Psychology. The editor-in-chief is Dennis B. Beringer.

== Abstracting and indexing ==
The journal is abstracted and indexed in:

- Current Contents/Social & Behavioral Sciences
- PsycINFO
- PubMed
- Scopus
- Social Sciences Citation Index
- CSA databases
- Academic Search Premier
- ProQuest

According to the Journal Citation Reports, the journal has a 2012 impact factor of 0.167, ranking it 71st out of 72 journals in the category "Applied Psychology".

== Notable articles ==
According to the Web of Science, the journal's most cited paper is:

- Helmreich, R. L.; Merritt, A. C.; Wilhelm, J. A. (1999). "The Evolution of Crew Resource Management Training in Commercial Aviation" (PDF). Int. J. Aviat. Psychol. 9 (1): 19–32. doi:10.1207/s15327108ijap0901_2. PMID 11541445. Archived from the original (PDF) on 2013-03-06. (As of July 2013 cited over 200 times)
