= Koneru Ramakrishna Rao =

Indian philosopher (1932–2021)

- Born: 4 October 1932
- Died: 9 November 2021 (aged 89)
- Writing career
- Subject: Philosophy
- Notable awards: Padma Shri

Koneru Ramakrishna Rao (4 October 1932 – 9 November 2021) was an Indian philosopher who served as Chancellor of GITAM (Deemed To Be University), and as Chairman of GITAM school of Gandhian Studies, psychologist, parapsychologist, educationist, teacher, researcher and administrator. The Government of India awarded him the civilian honour of Padma Shri in 2011.

== Biography ==
Rao was born on 4 October 1932, in the Delta region of Coastal Andhra, Madras Presidency, India. He did his college and graduate work at Andhra University, Waltair, India (B.A. hons., philosophy 1953; M.A. hons., psychology 1955; PhD, 1962). He was a lecturer in the Departments of Philosophy and Psychology at Andhra University from 1953 to 1958 under the tutelage of professors Saileswar Sen and Satchidananda Murthy. He left in 1958 to come to the United States as a Fulbright scholar. His stay at the University of Chicago was extended a year with a Rockefeller Fellowship with Richard McKeon at the University of Chicago and received PhD and D.Litt. degrees. He returned to India in 1960 as chief librarian at Andhra University (1960–61), but then moved to North Carolina to work with J. B. Rhine at the Parapsychology Laboratory at Duke University, North Carolina and later headed his Foundation for Research on the Nature of Man as its executive director.

He returned to Andhra University in the mid-1960s and in 1967 established the Department of Parapsychology, the only such university department of its kind in the world. In the meantime he had become a charter member of the Parapsychology Association and was elected as its secretary in 1963 and its president in 1965. (He was again elected president in 1978). In 1977 he became the director of the Institute for Parapsychology, but again in 1984 went back to Andhra to become the university's vice-chancellor. The following year he established the Institute for Yoga and Consciousness at Andhra and became its director. In 1987 he again became head of the Institute for Parapsychology, where he has remained. Most recently, he has served as the Chairman of the Indian Council of Philosophical Research for the Indian Government. He visited and lectured at universities in USA, Canada, United Kingdom, Germany, France, Greece, Sweden, the Netherlands, Denmark, Iceland, Italy, Japan, Pakistan, Thailand, Singapore and Sri Lanka.

In a 2002 festschrift, one of his former students described Rao as "a man of many interests... cross-cultural and cosmopolitan.... His writings are a blend of Eastern and Western traditions. They are an attempt to bring about, to use his own expression, the sangaman (confluence) of East-West streams of thought. Dr. K. Ramakrishna Rao is to Indian psychology what Dr. S. Radhakrishnan is to Indian philosophy".

Rao was profiled in the book Eminent Indian Psychologists: 100 years of Psychology in India (2017).

Awards received by Rao include Padma Shri (Literature and Education category) from Indian Government in 2011, Doctor of Letters (Honoris Causa) degrees from Andhra and Kakatiya Universities, and a Doctor of Science (Honoris Causa) degree from Acharya Nagarjuna University.

He also served as chancellor at GITAM University, Vishakaptnam, India.

Rao died on 9 November 2021 at the age of 89 in Visakhapatnam.

== Main publications ==
=== Books (sole author) ===
- Rao, Koneru Ramakrishna (2020). A Child of Destiny. GITAM. ISBN 978-8124610305. - an autobiography.
- Rao, Koneru Ramakrishna (2017). Gandhi's Dharma. New Delhi: Oxford University Press. ISBN 9780199477548. OCLC 1019894276.Reviewed
- K. Ramakrishna Rao. Foundations of Yoga Psychology. Singapore: Springer Nature, 2017. ISBN 9789811054099 doi:10.1007/978-981-10-5409-9
- K. Ramakrishna Rao. Consciousness studies: Cross-cultural perspectives. Jefferson, NC: McFarland, 2002. ISBN 0-7864-1382-4
- K. Ramakrishna Rao. The Basic Experiments in Parapsychology. Jefferson, N.C.: McFarland, 1984.
- K. Ramakrishna Rao. Mystic Awareness. Mysore, India, 1972.
- K. Ramakrishna Rao. Gandhi and Pragmatism. Calcutta & Oxford, N.p., 1968.
- K. Ramakrishna Rao. Experimental Parapsychology. Springfield, Ill.: Charles C. Thomas, 1966.
- K. Ramakrishna Rao. Psi Cognition. India: Tagore Publishing House, 1957.

=== Books (jointly authored or edited) ===
- Rao, K. Ramakrishna; Paranjpe, Anand C. (2016). Psychology in the Indian Tradition. New Delhi; Heidelberg: Springer. ISBN 978-8132224396.
- K. Ramakrishna Rao, Anand C. Paranjpe, & Ajit K. Dalal (Eds.). Handbook of Indian psychology. New Delhi, India: Cambridge University Press India/Foundation Books, 2008. ISBN 978-81-7596-602-4
- K. Ramakrishna Rao. J. B. Rhine: On the Frontiers of Science. Jefferson, N.C.: McFarland, 1982. ISBN 0-89950-053-6
- K. Ramakrishna Rao and K. S. Murty. Current Trends in Indian Thought. New Delhi, 1972.
- K. Ramakrishna Rao and P. Sailaja. Experimental Studies of the Differential Effect in Life Setting. N.p., 1972.

=== Journal articles ===
- K. Ramakrishna Rao (2005). "Perception, cognition and consciousness in classical Hindu psychology." Journal of Consciousness Studies, 12, 3–30. (abstract)
- K. Ramakrishna Rao (1961). "A Consideration of Some Theories in Parapsychology." Journal of Parapsychology, 25, 32–54.
- K. Ramakrishna Rao (1955). "Vedanta and the Modus Operandi of Paranormal Cognition." The Philosophical Quarterly, Vol. 5.
- K. Ramakrishna Rao, one of his Philosophy booklet, ("Muhammad, The Prophet of Islam") calls him the:

== See also ==
- Indian psychology
