= Lisa Miller (psychologist) =

American psychologist

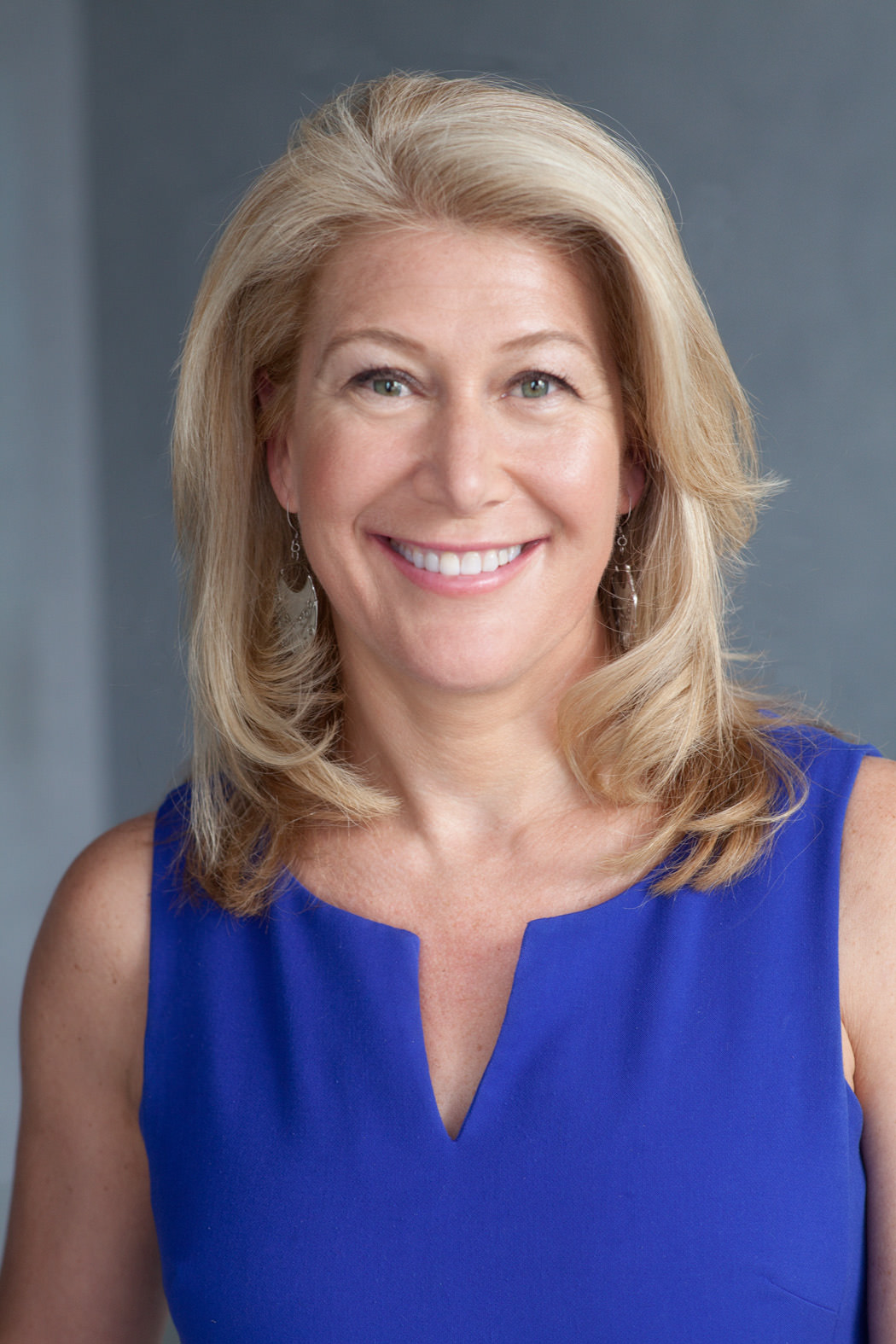
- Education: Yale University (BA); University of Pennsylvania (MS, PhD)
- Scientific career
- Fields: Psychology

Lisa Jane Miller is an American professor, researcher, and clinical psychologist, best known for her work on spirituality in psychology. Miller is a tenured professor at Columbia University, Teachers College in the Clinical Psychology Program and founder of the Spirituality Mind Body Institute. Miller's research into spirituality in renewal from addiction, depression, and struggle spans over 200 published articles and chapters, and has been extensively covered in the media to include the New York Times and the Wall Street Journal.

== Early life and early career ==
Miller obtained a bachelor's degree in psychology from Yale University and a doctorate under Martin Seligman, founder of the positive psychology movement, at the University of Pennsylvania. She attended the John Burroughs School in St. Louis for junior high school and graduated high school from Milton Academy near Boston.

== Books ==
- The Art and Practice of Living Wondrously (2025), contributor. ISBN 978-1-592-64711-8
- The Awakened Brain: The New Science of Spirituality and Our Quest for an Inspired Life (2021) ISBN 978-1-984-85562-6
- The Spiritual Child: The New Science on Parenting for Health and Lifelong Thriving (2015) ISBN 978-1-250-03292-8
- The Oxford Handbook of Psychology and Spirituality Editions 1 and 2 (2012)(2024) ISBN 978-0-199-72992-0
