= Journal of Reproductive and Infant Psychology =

Peer-reviewed journal

- Discipline: Child psychology, obstetrics and gynaecology, pediatrics
- Language: English
- Edited by: Susan Garthus-Niegel

Publication details
- History: 1983–present
- Publisher: Routledge
- Frequency: 5 issues/year
- Impact factor: 2.1 (2023)

Standard abbreviations
- ISO 4: J. Reprod. Infant Psychol.

Indexing
- ISSN: 0264-6838 (print); 1469-672X (web)
- LCCN: 2007233092
- OCLC no.: 1120659381

Links
- Journal homepage; Online access; Online archive

The Journal of Reproductive and Infant Psychology is a peer-reviewed medical journal covering psychology as it relates to human reproduction and infancy. It was established in 1983 and is published five times per year by Routledge on behalf of the Society for Reproductive and Infant Psychology, of which it is the official journal. The editor-in-chief is Susan Garthus-Niegel (Technische Universität Dresden). According to the Journal Citation Reports, the journal has a 2023 impact factor of 2.1.
