= Journal of Drug and Alcohol Research =

- Discipline: Pharmaceutical sciences
- Language: English

Publication details
- History: 2012–present
- Publisher: Ashdin Publishing (Egypt)
- Frequency: Monthly
- Open access: Yes
- License: CC BY-NC

Standard abbreviations
- ISO 4: J. Drug Alcohol Res.

Indexing
- ISSN: 2090-8334 (print); 2090-8342 (web)
- OCLC no.: 101597241

Links
- Journal homepage; Online access; Online archive

The Journal of Drug and Alcohol Research is a monthly peer-reviewed open-access medical journal covering addiction, addiction psychology, alcoholism, biopharmaceutics, pharmaceutical chemistry, pharmacognosy, pharmacology, a,d clinical and biomedical sciences. It is published by Ashdin Publishing, which was listed on Beall's list of predatory publishers before it was taken down in 2017.

== Abstracting and indexing ==
The journal is abstracted and indexed in Embase and Scopus.
