= Carol Graham =

American economist

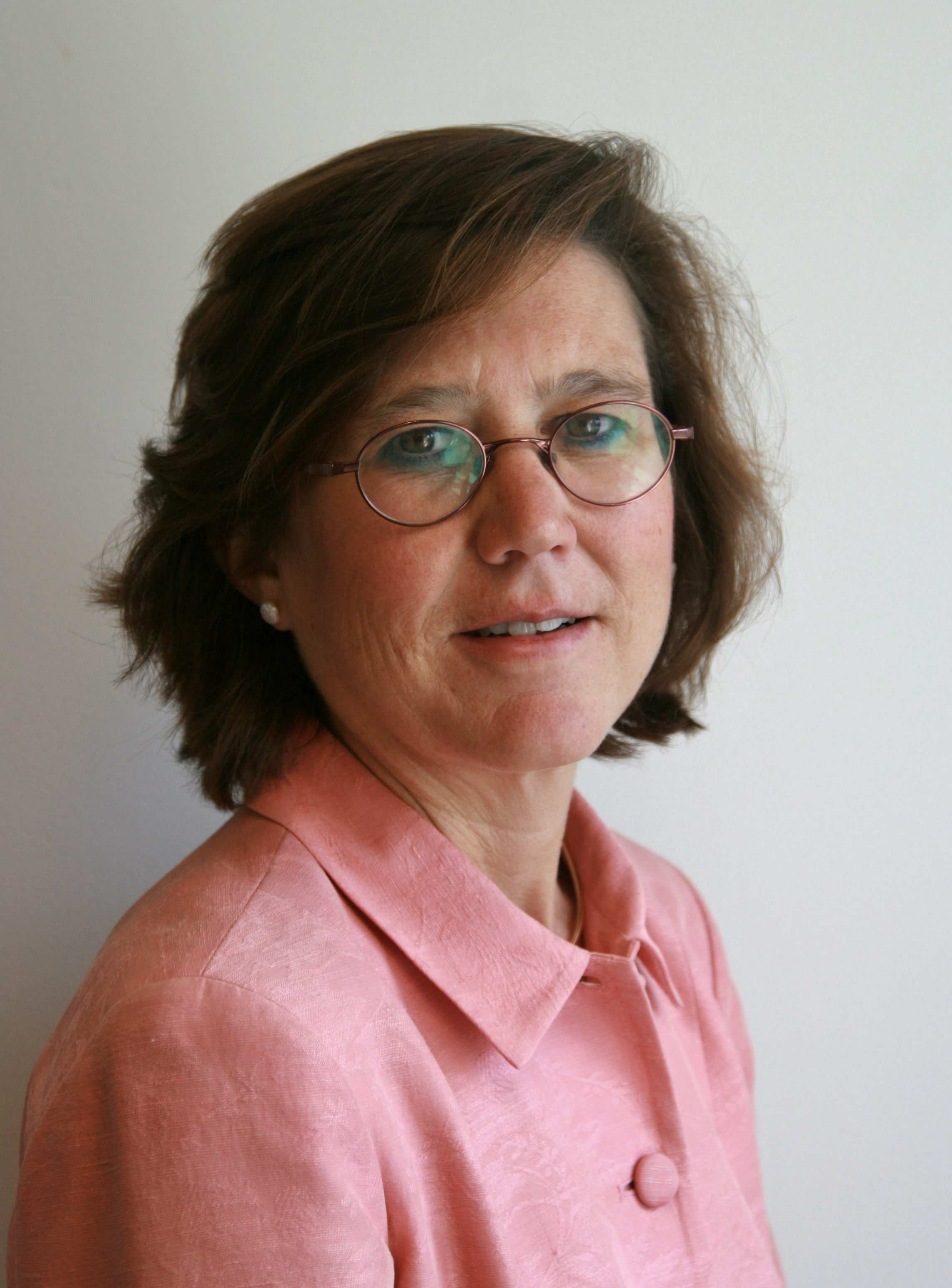
- Born: 29 January 1962 (age 64); Lima, Peru

Academic background
- Education: St Antony's College, Oxford
- Website: Information at IDEAS / RePEc

Carol Graham (born January 29, 1962) is the Leo Pasvolsky Senior Fellow at the Brookings Institution, a College Park professor at the School of Public Policy at the University of Maryland, a research fellow at the Institute for the Study of Labor (IZA), and the author of numerous books, papers and edited volume chapters.

Graham has written extensively and is considered an expert on issues including poverty, inequality, insecurity, the political economy of market reforms, subjective well-being, and the economics of happiness. In Happiness around the World: the Paradox of Happy Peasants and Miserable Millionaires (Oxford University Press, 2010, also published in Chinese, Portuguese, and Japanese), Graham explores what we know about the determinants of happiness across and within countries of different development levels, including some counterintuitive and surprising relationships. Her latest book, The Pursuit of Happiness: An Economy of Well-Being (Brookings Institution Press, 2011, also published in Chinese and Japanese), examines what the new science and metrics of well-being can contribute to policy and, in particular, if they can serve as new benchmarks of economic progress.

Over the course of her career, Graham's research has received support from the John D. and Catherine T. MacArthur Foundation, the World Bank, the Inter-American Development Bank, the Tinker and Hewlett Foundations, and the National Institute of Aging. She recently served on a National Academy of Sciences Panel on well-being metrics and public policy, and received a Distinguished Research Fellow Award from the International Society for Quality of Life Studies in September 2014.

== Education ==
She received her A.B. from Princeton University, her M.A. from the Johns Hopkins School of Advanced International Studies, and a Ph.D. from Oxford University. While at Princeton University, Graham received the Latin American Studies Thesis Prize and the Gale F. Johnston Prize in Public Affairs. In 1998, she was awarded a Council on Foreign Relations International Affairs Fellowship.

== Career ==
Graham began her career as a research fellow in the Foreign Policy Studies program at the Brookings Institution in 1988. After a year as an assistant professor at Duke University, Graham returned to Brookings where she was a guest scholar for Foreign Policy Studies until 1994. During this four-year tenure, she concurrently served as an adjunct professor in the Department of Government at Georgetown University. As a visiting fellow for the World Bank’s Office of the Chief Economist and Vice Presidency for Human Resources, Graham participated in the design and implementation of safety net programs in Latin America, Eastern Europe and Africa and developed a comparative research project on the political sustainability of market transitions. She has served as a special advisor to the Executive Vice President of the Inter-American Development Bank and to the Deputy Managing Director of the International Monetary Fund. Graham has also been a visiting professor in the Department of Economics at Johns Hopkins University and a professor in the School of Public Policy at the University of Maryland.

Graham acted as the co-director for the Center on Social and Economic Dynamics and senior fellow in Economic Studies at the Brookings Institution from 1998 to 2006. She also served as vice president and director of Governance Studies at Brookings from 2002 to 2004.

Graham has testified in the United States Congress several times on the economic situation in Latin America and has discussed related topics on NBC News, National Public Radio, the Newshour with Jim Lehrer, and CNN among others. Her work on well-being has been reviewed in The New Yorker, Science, The Washington Post, The Financial Times, and Newsweek, among others. She is managing policy editor of Behavioral Science and Policy, an associate editor of the Journal of Economic Behavior and Organization, and on the editorial board of the Journal of Applied Research on Quality of Life, among others. She serves on the Scientific Advisory Board of the Nutrition Research Institute in Lima, Peru, and on the research advisory board of the Center for Global Development in Washington.

Graham, who was born in Lima, Peru, is the mother of three children.

== Happiness for All: Unequal Hopes and Lives in Pursuit of the American Dream ==
This book is about the unequally shared American dream. It is distinct from other work on inequality because of the metrics that are used. Graham uses traditional measures of income inequality as a point of departure and then use well-being data to highlight inequality in beliefs, hope, and aspirations. The high costs of being poor in the U.S., for example, are more evident in stress, insecurity, and hopelessness than in material deprivation. Inadequate access to health insurance and stable employment play a role, but so do the increasing gaps between the lives of the rich and the poor. These inequities may lead to more unequal future outcomes, as individuals who do not believe in their futures are unlikely to invest in them. The markers are evident in income, education, and employment data; in differences in mortality, marriage, and incarceration rates; and in other signs of societal fragmentation. They are even reflected in the words that different cohorts use. Those of the wealthy reflect knowledge acquisition and healthy behaviors; those of the poor reflect desperation, short-term outlooks, and patchwork solutions. This is a complex problem, and there are no magic bullets. Her conclusions highlight the important role of well-being metrics in identifying and monitoring trends in life satisfaction and hope, and in desperation and misery. She finds, for example, remarkable levels of optimism among poor blacks but deep desperation among poor whites. She highlights policies – including experimental ones – in which hope is an important channel in improving economic outcomes.

"Carol Graham uses well-being measures to bring new insights to the divisions that are threatening America. Far from dreaming of a better tomorrow, many Americans, especially white Americans, are deeply pessimistic about their future and the futures of their children. This book brings much to think and to worry about." —Angus Deaton, Nobel Laureate in Economics

"With Happiness for All?, Carol Graham takes the study of the new inequality one step deeper. She tells what it means from the perspective of those who suffer from it, as she explores, from many different angles, how it affects Americans' sense of well-being, and their place within the American dream. This is a very important book, on the deepest social problem facing the United States today." —George Akerlof, Nobel Laureate in Economics

== The Pursuit of Happiness: An Economy of Well-Being ==
Carol Graham's most recent book, The Pursuit of Happiness: An Economy of Well-Being, raises the challenges posed by the use of measures of happiness as comparative well-being indicators. Economists are increasingly using happiness surveys to understand the debates on happiness and policy. Carol Graham was a pioneer in the economic study of happiness, and she has been involved from the beginning in discussions about applying this approach to economic policymaking. In this straightforward and accessible book, she discusses just this: "the promise—and potential pitfalls—of delving into the policy realm with happiness research and indicators."

"Since 1776 The Pursuit of Happiness has been the great world question. Here, reflecting on modern survey techniques and results, Carol Graham drills deeper. What does happiness mean? For example, is it opportunity for a meaningful life? Or, is it blissful contentment? And why does it vary, as it does, across individuals and around the world? How does the perception of happiness differ in countries as disparate as Cuba, Afghanistan, Japan, and Russia? Carol Graham is opening up a whole new frontier in economic and social policy." –George Akerlof, Professor of Economics at UC Berkeley and 2001 Nobel Laureate in Economics

== Publications: Selected books ==
- Happiness for All: Unequal Hopes and Lives in Pursuit of the American Dream. Princeton: Princeton University Press, 2017.
- The Pursuit of Happiness: an Economy of Well-Being. Washington, D.C.: The Brookings Institution Press, 2011.
- Happiness around the World: The Paradox of Happy Peasants and Miserable Millionaires. Oxford: Oxford University Press, 2010. (Also published in Chinese, Portuguese, and in paperback).
- Happiness and Hardship: Opportunity and Insecurity in New Market Economies, with Stefano Pettinato. Washington, D.C.: The Brookings Institution Press, 2002. (Also published in Spanish as Felicidad y Penurias: Oportunidades y Inseguridad en las Nuevas Economias del Mercado. Prometias Libros, 2005.)
- Private Markets for Public Goods: Raising the Stakes in Economic Reform. Washington, D.C.: The Brookings Institution Press, 1998.
- Safety Nets, Politics, and the Poor: Transitions to Market Economies. Washington, D.C.: The Brookings Institution, 1994.
- Peru's APRA. Boulder, CO: Lynne Rienner Publishers, 1992.

== Publications: Selected articles and chapters ==
- "Bentham or Aristotle in the Development Process? An Empirical Investigation of Capabilities and Subjective Well-Being", World Development, Vol. 68, April 2015, with Milena Nikolova.
- "Late-Life Work and Well-Being", IZA World of Labor, Vol. 107, November 2014.
- "Does Access to Information Technology Make People Happier? Insights from Well-Being Surveys from Around the World", Journal of Socio-Economics, Vol. 44, 2013. With Milena Nikolova.
- "Adaptation amidst Prosperity and Adversity: Insights from Happiness Studies from Around the World", World Bank Research Observer, forthcoming (doi;10.1093/wbro/lkq004).
- "Which Health Conditions Cause the Most Unhappiness?" Health Economics, with Lucas Higuera and Eduardo Lora, forthcoming (doi;10.1002/hec/1682).
- Insecurity, Health and Well-Being: An Initial Exploration Based on Happiness Surveys with Juan Camilo Chaparro (Inter-American Development Bank Monographs, March 2011).
- "Adapting to Adversity: Happiness and the Economic Crisis in the United States in 2009", with Soumya Chattopadhyay and Mario Picon in Social Research: An International Quarterly, Vol. 77, No. 2, Summer 2010.
- "The Easterlin and Other Paradoxes: Why Both Sides of the Debate May Be Correct" in Ed Diener, John Helliwell, and Daniel Kahneman, eds., International Differences in Well Being, (Oxford University Press, 2010).
- "Well-being and Public Attitudes in Afghanistan", World Economics, September–October 2009.
- "Can Happiness Research Help Fiscal Policy?" in Antonio Estache and Daniel Leipziger, eds., Stuck in the Middle: Is Fiscal Policy Failing the Middle Class? (The Brookings Institution Press, 2009).
- "The Economics of Happiness", chapter in The New Palgrave Dictionary of Economics, 2nd Edition, edited by Steven Durlauf and Larry Blume (Hampshire: Palgrave MacMillan, 2008).
- "Does Inequality Matter to Individual Welfare: Some Evidence from Happiness Surveys for Latin America", with Andrew Felton, Journal of Economic Inequality, Vol. 4, January 2006.
- "Does Happiness Pay? An Exploration Based on Panel Data from Russia", Journal of Economic Behavior and Organization, Vol.55 (2004), with Andrew Eggers and Sandip Sukhtankar.
