= National Academy of Psychology =

- Formation: 1989
- Headquarters: Department of Psychology, University of Allahabad, Prayagraj, India 211002
- Members: 435 members
- President: Kumar Ravi Priya
- Secretary General: Sonali De
- Website: www.naopindia.org

The National Academy of Psychology (NAOP) is the major national organization of psychologists in India. The decision to form the organization was made in 1988 by psychologists gathered at Bhopal University. L. B. Tripathy was the convenor of the advisory committee for drafting the organization's constitution. The organization was established in 1989. Ajit K. Mohanty was the first convenor of the NAOP.

Since 2000, the official journal of the NAOP has been Psychological Studies, edited (as of 2015) by Girishwar Misra.
