= Journal of Experimental Psychopathology =

Peer-reviewed journal focused on psychopathology

- Discipline: Psychopathology
- Language: English
- Edited by: Graham Davey

Publication details
- History: 2010
- Publisher: SAGE Publications
- Frequency: Continuous
- Open access: Yes
- Impact factor: 0.812 (2018)

Standard abbreviations
- ISO 4: J. Exp. Psychopathol.

Indexing
- ISSN: 2043-8087 (print); 2043-8087 (web)
- OCLC no.: 863114689

Links
- Journal homepage; Online archive

The Journal of Experimental Psychopathology is a continuously published open access journal covering psychopathology. It was established in 2010 and is published by SAGE Publications. It was relaunched as an open access journal in 2018, after it was combined with the pre-existing journal Psychopathology Review. The editor-in-chief is Graham Davey (University of Sussex). According to the Journal Citation Reports, the journal has a 2018 impact factor of 0.812, ranking it 108th out of 130 journals in the category "Psychology, Clinical".
