= Mir@bel =

Database of French scientific journals

- Website type: Collaborative database to increase the access to online journal content
- Available in: French
- Founded: 2009
- Headquarters: Lyon
- Website: reseau-mirabel.info (in French)

Mir@bel refers to both the collaborative database designed to gather and make the most of the information available online about trade magazines and the network of professionals (documentalists, librarians, editors) who contribute to it. Created in 2009, the knowledge base initially focused on SHS journals but has since been extended to other STM disciplines (Science, Technology, and Medicine) in line with the needs and investments of network members. Interconnections with various journal portals, library tools and information systems such as Sherpa Romeo have multiplied since its creation.

== History ==
Mir@bel - for "Mutualisation d'Informations sur les Revues et leurs Accès dans les Bases En Ligne" - was founded in 2009 on the initiative of three establishments: Sciences Po Lyon, Sciences Po Grenoble and ENS de Lyon, the project having emerged within their libraries. In 2016, the Dijon School of Humanities (MSH Dijon, CNRS / uB) and the École nationale des travaux publics de l'État (ENTPE) joined the network's pilot institutions, replacing the Diderot Library of ENS Lyon.

The Mir@bel prototype was presented at a "Workshop on sharing systems for reporting journal content in the humanities and social sciences" on 27 November 2008 in Lyon.

A second version (with a new interface and new functions) was introduced in 2012. In March 2017, the network announced the release of its content under an open licence, and then, in April 2020, the application's source code was released under the Affero GPL licence and placed on GitLab.

In 2020, under the guidance of the Committee for Open Science, Mir@bel formed a partnership with the Jisc team that developed the Sherpa Romeo database. A working group has been set up for this purpose, led by Bernard Teissier. In February 2022, a service for declaring publication policies was launched, for French scientific journals, led by a moderation group within the Mir@bel network.

In 2020 and 2023, the Mir@bel network has twice won the call for projects from the French National Open Science Fund (FNSO), under the coordination of Sophie Fotiadi.

== Content ==
The Mir@bel database, dedicated to scientific journals in the humanities and social sciences (SHS) for a long time, has gradually been enriched with publications from other disciplines in the sciences, technology and medicine (STM), as well as professional journals, magazines and newspapers.

This database's thematic coverage is intrinsically linked to the needs and investments of the network members who contribute to it. For example, the libraries of political science establishments have used it to provide online access to journals in this discipline, as have the librarians of the architecture school network and the members of the Frantiq network for journals in archaeology and the ancient sciences.

The journals listed here are mainly English- or French-language, but also Spanish- or German-language, and two-thirds are bilingual. And they are both active publications and those that have ceased publication.

The database created in 2009 began by indicating where to find the full text of articles, issue summaries, article abstracts and bibliographic references online for each journal. It has evolved to include a number of additional bounce-backs providing access to a journal's entire online environment.

Thanks to automated updates from several distribution platforms (referred to as resources in Mir@bel) such as Cairn. info, Érudit, OpenEdition, Persée, and publishers' platforms or journal incubators federated within the Repères network, as well as individual monitoring work by network members and strengthened partnerships with the Agence Bibliographique de l'Enseignement Supérieur (ABES) and the Centre ISSN France, the Mir@bel network plays a role in the quality of journal metadata at the source.

Since 2022, more than a hundred publishers (publishing houses, learned societies, laboratories with publishing activities, etc.) have benefited from the Mir@bel publication policy declaration service.

In 2024, more than 20,000 journals were reported, including 6,000 updated daily.

== Organisation and operation ==
The Mir@bel network does not have its own legal structure. In 2024, it will be steered by 4 institutions: Sciences Po Lyon, Sciences Po Grenoble, MSH Dijon and ENTPE, which will be responsible for setting the direction and an annual roadmap, in conjunction with an "operational steering committee" open to partner members who wish to get involved.

Two types of partnerships can be entered into to participate in the network:

- A partnership agreement is signed between the member institutions, with Sciences Po Lyon acting on behalf of the other pilot institutions;
- A more flexible partnership for publishers in the form of a letter of commitment.

The database is fed in 3 ways by:

- monitoring partners within institutions that have signed an agreement, mainly represented by university libraries or other documentation services;
- publishing partners representing public and private publishing houses, as well as a number of laboratories that have developed a publishing activity;
- resource partners, essentially distribution platforms with which updates have been automated.

The network's operations and database are based on the sharing and pooling of information from journals. Several dozen French-language libraries and institutions use it and check its content.

The interface has been developed by SILECS, an IT services company specialising in open source solutions. The knowledge base was funded from the outset by the Rhône-Alpes Region, and over the last few years has received new funding from prize-winning projects and institutional financial support.

== Examples of applications and interconnections ==
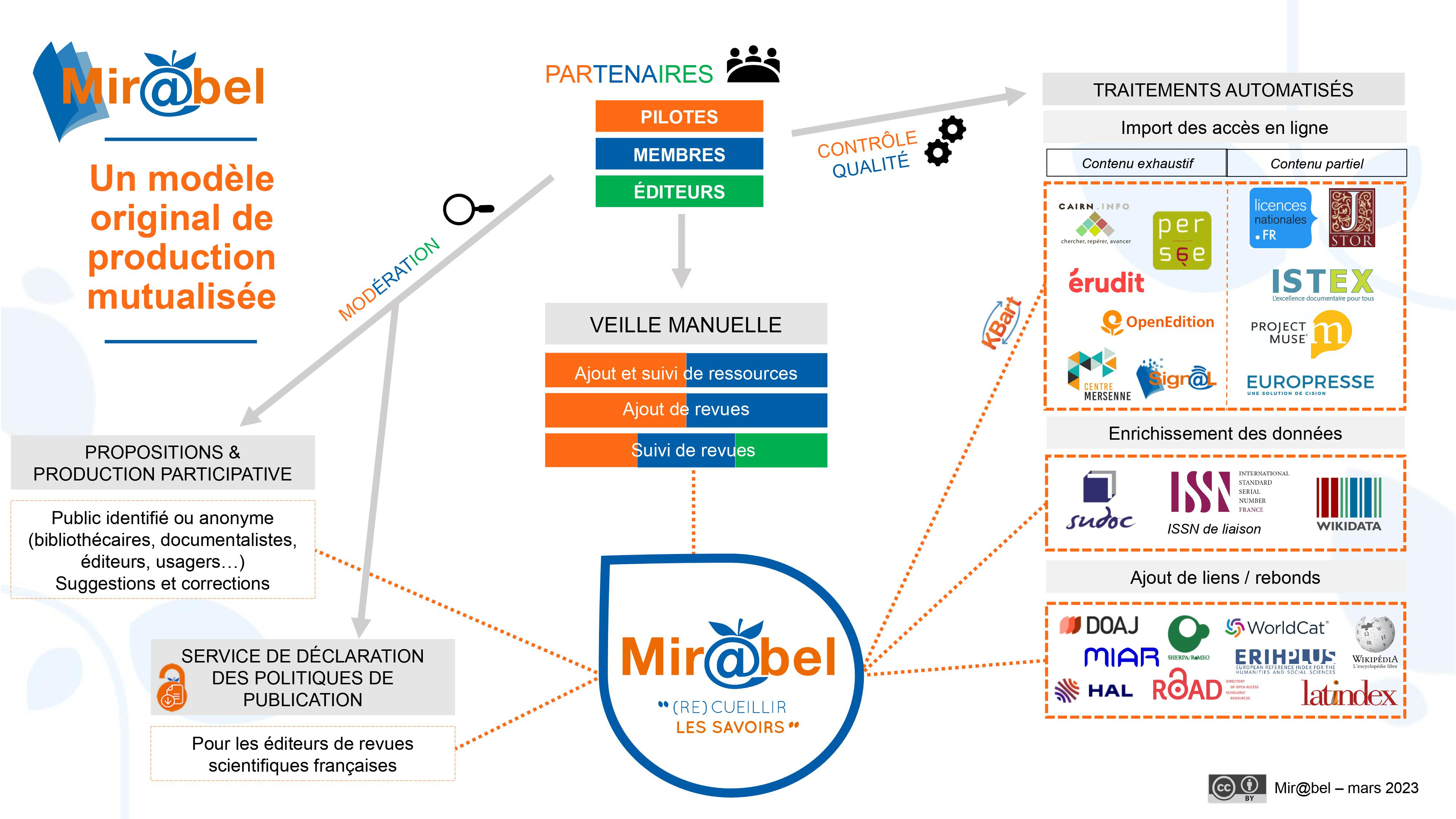
Presentation diagram of the data production at Mirabel (March 2023)

In order to enhance library catalogues, webservice enables Mir@bel data to be automatically retrieved from integrated library management systems (SIGB) such as Koha, Syracuse, C3RB or PMB.

Among its features, Mir@bel integrates the identifiers of numerous external authority databases and provides rebound links to them. These include: JSTOR, Cairn, Érudit, Persée, OpenEdition Journals, Sherpa/Romeo, DOAJ and Wikidata.

Mir@bel has deployed a publication policy declaration service for French scientific journals, intended to feed the Sherpa Romeo database and, by extension, the HAL open archive.

The Mir@bel2022 project, supported by the FNSO, brings together 14 partners committed to "cooperating to facilitate the referencing of open access journals in the DOAJ and to contribute to improving the sharing of metadata on scientific journals and their editorial structures".
