= Psychology & Developing Societies =

- Discipline: Psychology
- Language: English
- Edited by: R C Tripathi

Publication details
- History: 1989
- Publisher: SAGE Publications (India)
- Frequency: Bi-annual

Standard abbreviations
- ISO 4: Psychol. Dev. Soc.

Indexing
- ISSN: 0971-3336 (print); 0973-0761 (web)

Links
- Journal homepage; Online access; Online archive

Psychology and Developing Societies (PDS) is a peer-reviewed journal. It serves as a forum for discussion for psychologists from different parts of the world concerned with the problems of developing societies. In pursuit of that aim, the journal especially encourages articles which reflect the unique sociocultural and historical experience of developing countries and provide alternative paradigms, indigenous concepts and methods which have relevance for social policy in these countries. It is published twice a year by SAGE Publishing.

== Abstracting and indexing ==
Psychology and Developing Societies is abstracted and indexed in:

- ProQuest: International Bibliography of the Social Sciences (IBSS)
- SCOPUS
- Research Papers in Economics
- DeepDyve
- Portico
- Dutch-KB
- Pro-Quest-RSP
- EBSCO
- OCLC
- Ohio
- ICI
- ProQuest-Illustrata
- PsycINFO
- J-Gate
