= Journal of Theoretical and Philosophical Psychology =

- Discipline: Psychology
- Language: English
- Edited by: Brent D. Slife

Publication details
- History: 1986-present
- Publisher: American Psychological Association (United States)
- Frequency: Quarterly

Standard abbreviations
- ISO 4: J. Theor. Philos. Psychol.

Indexing
- ISSN: 1068-8471 (print); 2151-3341 (web)

Links
- Journal homepage; Online access

The Journal of Theoretical and Philosophical Psychology is a peer-reviewed academic journal published by the American Psychological Association on behalf of APA Division 24 (Society for Theoretical and Philosophical Psychology). The journal was established in 1986 and "is devoted to fostering discussion at the interface of psychology, philosophy, and metatheory". The current editor-in-chief is Brent D. Slife.

== Abstracting and indexing ==
The journal is abstracted and indexed in Scopus.
