= Psychological Studies =

- Discipline: Psychology
- Language: English
- Edited by: Purnima Singh

Publication details
- History: 1956-present
- Publisher: Springer Science+Business Media on behalf of the National Academy of Psychology
- Frequency: Quarterly

Standard abbreviations
- ISO 4: Psychol. Stud.

Indexing
- ISSN: 0033-2968 (print); 0974-9861 (web)
- LCCN: 83054911
- OCLC no.: 433933791

Links
- Journal homepage; Journal page at National Academy of Psychology website; Online archive

Psychological Studies is a quarterly peer-reviewed academic journal published by Springer Science+Business Media. It is the official journal of the Indian National Academy of Psychology. The editor-in-chief is Purnima Singh (IIT Delhi). The special issue editor is Girishwar Misra (University of Delhi), who served as the editor-in-chief for 15 years through the end of 2015.

== History ==
The journal was established in 1956 and first published by the University of Mysore, with Bangalore Kuppuswamy as editor. It was published twice per year through 1987.

Beginning in July, 1978, Psychological Studies was published through the University of Calicut, with M. A. Faroqi as editor. From 1988 through 2003, the journal was published triannually. In 1990, a UNESCO publication described Psychological Studies as important among Indian psychology journals published by university departments. In 1991, among journals operated by Indian psychologists to publish their research, Psychological Studies was noted as important.

In 2000, the journal became the official journal of the National Academy of Psychology (India), which served as its publisher from 2004 to 2008. In 2002, Psychological Studies was one of four Indian psychology journals (out of 44 total) described as having international standards. Beginning in 2004, the journal began to be published quarterly. Starting in 2009, Psychological Studies is published by Springer India.

== Abstracting and indexing ==
The journal is abstracted and indexed in the Indian Citation Index, Scopus, PsycINFO, and ProQuest databases.
