= The Journal of General Psychology =

- Discipline: Psychology
- Language: English
- Edited by: Paula Goolkasian, David Trafimow

Publication details
- History: 1928–present
- Publisher: Routledge
- Frequency: Quarterly
- Impact factor: 0.612 (2016)

Standard abbreviations
- ISO 4: J. Gen. Psychol.

Indexing
- CODEN: JGPSAY
- ISSN: 0022-1309 (print); 1940-0888 (web)
- LCCN: 33012701
- OCLC no.: 889382119

Links
- Journal homepage; Online archive

The Journal of General Psychology is a quarterly peer-reviewed scientific journal covering experimental psychology. It was established in 1928 and is published by Routledge. The editors-in-chief are Paula Goolkasian (University of North Carolina, Charlotte) and David Trafimow (New Mexico State University). According to the Journal Citation Reports, the journal has a 2016 5-year impact factor of 0.612.
