= Hogrefe Publishing Group =

German publisher specialising in psychology

- Founded: 1949; 77 years ago
- Founder: Carl Jürgen Hogrefe
- Country of origin: Germany
- Headquarters location: Göttingen
- Publication types: academic journals and books
- Nonfiction topics: psychology and psychiatry
- Official website: www.hogrefe.com

Hogrefe Publishing Group is an international company that publishes academic journals and books in the fields of psychology and psychiatry.

The first company in the group, Hogrefe Verlag, was founded in 1949 by Carl Jürgen Hogrefe in Göttingen, Germany, where it is still based today. The group now includes publishing companies in fifteen countries. It has been publishing journals in North America in the 1970s, where its local division, Hogrefe Publishing Corp., was originally based in Toronto, Canada. Its North American division headquarters was relocated to the United States in the late 1980s to Boston, Massachusetts.
