= Opinion polling for the 2015 Danish general election =

In the run up to the 2015 Danish general election, various organisations are carrying out opinion polling to gauge voting intention in Denmark. Results of such polls are given in this article.

== Poll results ==
Polling Firm	Date	V	A	O	B	F	Ø	I	C	K	Å	Lead	Red (A+B+F+Ø+Å)	Blue (V+O+I+C+K)
Election results	June 18, 2015	19.5	26.3	21.1	4.6	4.2	7.8	7.5	3.4	0.8	4.7	5.2	47.7	52.3
Gallup	June 17	20.6	25.9	18.1	5.2	5.3	8.0	7.1	3.8	1.1	4.7	5.3	49.2	50.7
Greens	June 17	20.9	24.4	18.5	5.6	5.4	8.5	7.6	3.3	0.6	5.2	3.5	49.1	50.9
Voxmeter	June 17	19.6	25.9	17.2	4.6	6.3	9.8	7.7	3.5	0.9	4.5	6.3	51.1	48.9
Epinion	June 17	20.6	24.5	18.0	5.2	5.3	9.3	7.5	3.9	0.7	4.9	4.3	49.2	50.7
Megafon	June 17	20.6	25.5	17.9	5.0	5.2	8.6	7.7	3.9	0.9	4.6	5.1	48.9	51.0
Gallup	June 16	20.6	26.4	17.6	4.6	4.9	9.1	7.2	4.1	0.8	4.2	5.8	49.2	50.8
Wilke	June 16	19.8	24.0	17.5	5.2	5.5	9.0	7.8	4.7	1.0	5.5	4.2	49.2	50.8
Voxmeter	June 16	21.3	26.1	16.1	4.8	6.2	8.1	8.4	3.5	1.0	4.3	4.8	49.5	50.3
Greens	June 16	20.4	24.4	19.5	5.2	5.7	8.5	7.2	3.2	0.5	5.4	4.0	49.2	50.8
Megafon	June 16	20.4	25.5	17.9	5.0	5.3	8.4	8.0	3.8	1.0	4.6	5.1	49.3	50.7
Epinion	June 16	20.4	24.7	17.6	4.8	5.8	9.4	7.9	3.7	1.0	4.7	4.3	49.4	50.6
Gallup	June 15	21.2	25.4	18.0	5.1	4.9	8.6	7.2	3.7	1.1	4.7	4.2	48.7	51.2
Wilke	June 15	18.8	25.9	16.7	5.6	5.7	8.1	8.3	4.6	1.5	5.0	7.1	50.3	49.7
Greens	June 15	19.8	24.6	19.2	4.7	5.6	9.4	7.7	3.3	0.7	5.0	4.8	49.3	50.7
Voxmeter	June 15	21.9	26.6	15.7	5.0	6.4	8.4	8.1	3.0	0.8	3.9	4.7	50.3	49.5
Epinion	June 15	20.3	24.1	18.4	5.0	6.2	9.0	7.5	4.3	0.9	4.2	3.8	48.5	51.4
Megafon	June 15	20.0	25.8	18.1	5.3	5.1	8.3	8.1	3.4	1.2	4.6	5.8	49.8	50.2
Wilke	June 14	19.4	26.2	16.7	5.3	5.4	7.5	8.8	4.5	1.2	5.0	6.8	49.4	50.6
Gallup	June 14	21.2	26.3	18.0	4.8	5.0	8.5	6.9	3.4	1.2	4.6	5.1	49.2	50.7
Voxmeter	June 14	22.4	26.9	16.2	4.6	6.6	7.6	7.5	2.7	0.7	4.6	4.5	50.4	49.5
Greens	June 14	20.4	23.7	19.6	5.2	5.6	9.1	8.2	2.9	1.2	4.1	3.3	47.7	52.3
Megafon	June 14	20.7	25.7	17.4	5.5	5.3	7.6	8.5	3.5	1.1	4.6	5.0	49.3	50.7
Epinion	June 14	20.2	24.9	18.8	4.3	5.3	8.6	8.2	3.9	0.8	5.0	4.7	48.1	51.9
Voxmeter	June 13	23.3	26.1	16.9	4.7	6.3	7.1	7.6	2.6	0.8	4.3	2.8	48.5	51.3
Gallup	June 13	21.0	26.3	18.4	5.0	4.9	8.4	6.4	3.5	1.5	4.4	5.3	49.1	50.9
Wilke	June 13	20.2	24.5	17.0	5.5	6.5	8.2	8.9	4.1	0.8	4.3	4.3	49.0	51.0
Megafon	June 13	20.4	24.8	17.5	6.4	6.4	7.2	8.9	3.5	0.9	3.9	4.4	48.7	51.3
Greens	June 13	20.6	23.6	20.2	5.3	5.3	9.1	8.0	2.9	1.2	3.8	3.0	47.1	52.9
Epinion	June 13	20.0	25.6	19.7	4.6	4.5	8.1	8.4	3.7	0.7	4.8	4.7	47.6	52.4
Voxmeter	June 12	21.1	25.6	17.8	5.0	5.5	8.2	7.5	3.5	0.9	4.5	4.5	48.8	51.2
Gallup	June 12	21.2	25.5	18.5	4.9	5.4	8.1	7.7	3.3	1.0	4.4	4.3	48.3	51.7
Greens	June 12	20.5	24.3	19.2	4.9	6.1	8.2	8.9	2.8	1.1	4.0	3.8	47.5	52.5
Megafon	June 12	20.7	25.0	16.9	5.8	5.5	8.0	8.5	3.9	1.5	4.1	4.3	48.4	51.6
Wilke	June 12	21.4	24.7	16.6	5.3	6.7	8.2	8.6	3.6	1.1	3.8	4.6	48.1	51.9
Epinion	June 12	20.7	25.3	19.3	4.3	4.9	8.5	8.2	3.3	0.7	5.1	4.6	48.1	51.9
Wilke	June 11	21.0	25.0	16.4	5.5	6.3	8.9	7.7	3.9	1.1	4.2	4.0	49.9	50.1
Gallup	June 11	20.8	26.5	17.5	4.8	4.7	9.3	6.8	4.3	0.7	4.4	5.7	49.8	50.2
Megafon	June 11	21.3	25.2	16.8	6.0	5.4	8.5	9.0	3.3	0.8	3.6	3.9	48.7	51.3
Voxmeter	June 11	22.7	26.1	18.0	5.2	5.7	6.6	7.5	3.1	0.9	4.0	3.4	47.6	52.2
Greens	June 11	20.3	24.4	18.5	4.5	6.3	8.2	8.8	3.0	0.7	5.3	4.1	48.7	51.3
Epinion	June 11	20.2	24.9	19.2	5.3	5.5	8.3	8.0	3.2	0.9	4.6	4.7	48.6	51.4
Wilke	June 10	20.9	25.8	17.0	5.7	5.8	8.5	8.1	3.9	0.1	4.2	4.9	50.0	50.0
Gallup	June 10	20.8	25.8	16.7	5.2	4.7	9.4	7.4	4.5	0.7	4.6	5.0	49.7	50.1
Greens	June 10	20.6	25.8	16.9	4.8	5.8	8.7	9.3	2.5	0.4	5.2	5.2	50.3	49.7
Megafon	June 10	20.1	26.2	17.3	5.7	4.9	8.5	8.2	4.0	0.7	4.3	6.1	49.6	50.4
Voxmeter	June 10	22.0	26.9	17.4	5.8	5.1	7.1	7.4	3.5	1.1	3.7	4.9	48.6	51.4
Epinion	June 10	19.1	25.1	19.0	4.9	6.5	7.7	8.5	3.1	0.8	5.2	6.0	49.4	50.5
Wilke	June 9	21.1	25.0	17.1	5.5	5.6	7.6	8.8	4.1	1.0	4.2	3.9	47.9	52.1
Gallup	June 9	19.9	25.6	17.6	5.3	4.3	10.2	7.9	4.0	1.1	4.1	5.7	49.5	50.5
Megafon	June 9	20.6	26.0	17.2	5.5	4.4	8.3	8.6	4.0	0.9	4.4	5.4	48.6	51.4
Greens	June 9	19.6	26.4	17.6	4.9	5.9	9.8	7.8	2.8	0.3	4.9	4.9	51.9	48.1
Voxmeter	June 9	21.5	26.4	16.8	6.2	5.4	7.7	6.9	3.3	1.4	4.3	4.9	50.0	49.9
Epinion	June 9	19.0	26.0	19.5	4.7	5.9	8.0	8.0	3.3	0.8	4.8	6.5	49.4	50.6
Norstat	June 8	18.7	26.9	19.3	4.1	6.7	10.7	6.1	2.7	0.5	3.7	7.6	52.1	47.3
Megafon	June 8	20.8	25.6	17.5	5.0	4.7	8.4	8.6	4.2	0.6	4.5	4.8	48.2	51.8
Wilke	June 8	20.8	25.0	17.4	5.7	6.2	7.4	9.3	3.9	0.6	3.7	4.2	48.0	52.0
Gallup	June 8	20.0	26.1	17.4	5.5	4.6	10.1	7.6	4.2	1.4	3.1	6.1	49.4	50.6
Voxmeter	June 8	21.9	26.0	16.2	6.4	5.9	8.2	6.5	3.3	1.2	4.4	7.6	50.9	49.1
Greens	June 8	19.5	27.1	18.3	5.0	5.6	9.4	7.6	2.9	0.1	4.6	7.6	51.6	48.4
Epinion	June 8	20.0	26.7	18.3	4.8	6.0	8.8	7.3	3.4	0.4	4.3	6.7	50.6	49.4
Megafon	June 7	21.0	25.5	17.3	5.4	5.7	8.8	7.6	4.0	1.0	3.6	4.5	49.0	51.0
Gallup	June 7	19.4	26.4	18.2	5.0	5.1	9.1	7.6	4.1	1.3	3.8	7.0	49.4	50.6
Voxmeter	June 7	21.1	26.8	16.5	6.3	6.4	8.5	6.0	3.6	0.9	3.9	5.7	51.9	48.1
Greens	June 7	19.3	25.5	19.0	5.2	5.0	9.5	7.4	3.7	0.2	4.9	6.2	50.1	49.9
Epinion	June 7	20.0	26.7	17.8	4.9	5.9	9.0	7.4	3.7	0.5	4.0	6.7	50.5	49.4
Wilke	June 6	19.1	24.9	19.1	6.7	6.5	8.5	7.2	3.4	0.8	3.8	5.9	50.4	49.6
Greens	June 6	20.0	25.6	19.5	5.2	5.5	8.3	7.7	3.5	0.2	4.5	5.6	49.1	50.9
Voxmeter	June 6	20.5	27.0	17.2	6.3	6.0	7.7	6.9	4.1	0.6	3.6	6.5	50.7	49.3
Epinion	June 6	20.2	26.4	18.3	5.3	5.6	8.8	7.2	3.7	0.6	4.0	6.2	50.1	49.9
Wilke	June 5	19.3	23.5	20.2	7.2	5.8	9.0	6.3	4.2	0.9	3.6	4.5	49.1	50.9
Gallup	June 5	19.1	26.9	18.1	5.2	6.2	7.3	6.7	4.5	1.2	4.6	7.8	50.2	49.6
Voxmeter	June 5	20.2	27.1	17.0	5.8	5.7	7.9	7.6	4.1	0.8	3.6	6.9	50.2	49.7
Greens	June 5	20.6	25.7	19.2	4.7	6.0	8.7	7.0	3.9	0.6	3.6	5.1	48.7	51.3
Epinion	June 5	20.2	26.4	18.7	4.7	5.8	8.7	7.3	3.4	0.6	4.2	6.2	50.1	49.9
Gallup	June 4	20.7	27.6	18.1	5.4	5.7	8.0	5.5	4.1	0.8	4.0	6.9	50.8	49.2
Wilke	June 4	20.0	24.5	19.2	6.4	5.9	8.6	6.7	4.4	1.0	3.3	4.5	49.2	50.8
Megafon	June 4	21.5	25.5	18.6	5.3	6.2	8.1	6.5	3.2	1.4	3.6	4.0	49.5	50.5
Greens	June 4	20.5	26.8	19.7	4.0	6.5	8.0	6.9	3.8	0.5	3.3	6.3	48.6	51.4
Voxmeter	June 4	20.1	26.7	17.2	5.5	5.9	8.4	8.4	3.7	0.8	3.3	6.6	49.8	50.1
Epinion	June 4	21.0	26.4	18.9	4.7	5.7	8.6	6.8	3.4	0.7	3.8	5.4	49.6	50.4
Wilke	June 3	19.8	24.7	18.6	7.2	6.4	8.5	6.8	4.1	0.6	3.3	4.9	50.1	49.9
Gallup	June 3	21.8	25.8	18.7	5.2	4.8	9.5	6.0	4.0	0.4	3.6	4.0	49.0	51.0
Greens	June 3	20.1	26.6	18.6	4.0	6.4	9.4	7.3	3.4	0.5	3.2	6.5	50.1	49.9
Voxmeter	June 3	20.7	26.2	16.9	4.9	6.4	9.2	7.9	3.1	0.9	3.8	5.5	50.4	49.5
Epinion	June 3	20.6	25.7	18.3	4.2	6.3	8.7	8.2	3.4	0.6	3.8	5.1	48.8	51.2
Megafon	June 3	20.8	25.5	18.8	5.7	6.6	8.3	6.6	3.3	1.2	3.1	4.7	49.8	50.2
Wilke	June 2	19.3	25.0	18.4	7.4	6.7	8.2	6.7	3.6	0.8	3.9	5.7	51.2	48.8
Greens	June 2	20.5	26.4	18.5	4.0	6.6	9.2	8.3	3.5	0.3	2.7	5.9	48.9	51.1
Gallup	June 2	22.4	25.1	19.0	6.0	4.7	9.6	5.8	3.6	0.5	3.0	2.7	48.5	51.5
Megafon	June 2	21.1	25.3	18.2	6.8	5.9	8.0	7.0	3.0	1.3	3.3	4.2	50.0	50.0
Voxmeter	June 2	21.5	25.6	17.1	5.3	6.9	9.0	7.7	2.6	0.8	3.4	4.1	50.1	49.7
Epinion	June 2	21.0	26.1	17.9	4.5	5.8	9.1	8.0	3.6	0.8	3.1	5.8	48.6	51.3
Gallup	June 1	21.5	24.7	18.8	6.0	5.0	9.7	6.4	4.0	0.5	3.1	3.2	48.5	51.2
Wilke	June 1	19.3	25.1	17.9	7.4	6.5	8.2	7.0	3.7	0.9	4.0	5.8	51.2	48.8
Epinion	June 1	20.0	25.8	18.9	4.8	5.5	9.5	7.4	3.7	0.4	4.0	5.8	49.6	50.4
Greens	June 1	20.6	24.8	18.0	4.2	7.2	10.2	7.7	3.8	0.7	2.8	4.2	49.2	50.8
Voxmeter	June 1	21.7	25.9	17.2	5.2	7.2	8.8	7.9	2.5	0.6	2.9	4.2	50.0	49.9
Wilke	May 31	20.4	24.2	19.0	6.8	6.9	7.9	7.2	4.1	0.7	2.8	3.8	48.6	51.4
Voxmeter	May 31	21.2	26.8	17.0	5.6	7.2	8.7	7.9	2.6	0.4	2.2	5.6	50.6	49.2
Greens	May 31	20.4	24.3	18.8	5.0	7.0	10.0	7.0	4.1	0.7	2.7	3.9	49.0	51.0
Epinion	May 31	20.5	26.4	19.1	4.9	5.6	9.1	6.7	3.8	0.3	3.7	5.9	49.7	50.3
Greens	May 31	20.1	24.5	19.6	5.5	6.8	10.2	6.2	3.8	0.9	2.4	4.4	49.4	50.6
Voxmeter	May 30	20.6	27.1	17.5	5.5	7.2	8.2	8.1	3.1	0.5	1.9	6.5	49.9	49.8
Epinion	May 30	20.8	26.4	19.4	5.1	5.8	8.8	6.4	3.9	0.3	3.2	5.6	49.3	50.7
Greens	May 30	19.8	24.3	20.2	6.0	6.4	10.0	5.8	4.5	0.5	2.5	4.1	49.2	50.8
Wilke	May 29	21.6	25.3	18.2	7.0	5.9	8.7	6.9	3.6	0.7	2.1	3.7	49.0	51.0
Epinion	May 29	21.0	26.6	19.6	5.0	6.1	8.6	6.4	3.8	0.4	2.5	5.6	48.8	51.2
Gallup	May 29	20.7	24.9	19.4	6.0	6.1	9.2	6.8	4.3	0.5	2.1	4.2	48.3	51.7
Epinion	May 28	20.8	25.4	20.5	5.5	6.1	9.2	6.3	4.1	0.3	1.9	4.6	48.1	51.9
Voxmeter	May 28	21.4	25.5	18.3	6.2	6.3	8.1	8.2	3.5	0.6	1.6	4.1	47.8	52.1
Greens	May 27	19.5	24.8	20.1	6.1	6.0	10.2	6.1	4.6	0.3	2.3	4.7	49.4	50.6
Epinion	May 27	22.1	25.3	20.2	5.5	5.9	8.3	6.4	4.0	0.5	1.7	3.2	46.7	53.2
Megafon	May 27	19,6	24.1	19.3	6.3	7.1	7.8	7.6	4.6	1.0	2.0	4.5	47.5	52.1
Gallup	May 27	21,3	24.5	18.7	5.6	6.0	10.2	6.5	4.3	0.4	2.5	3.2	48.8	51.2
Voxmeter	May 27	23.8	24.7	18.4	5.8	6.2	7.7	7.8	3.2	1.1	1.2	0.9	45.6	54.3
YouGov	May 27	19.6	26.1	19.7	5.3	5.3	8.3	8.0	4.0	0.7	2.9	6.4	48.0	52.0
Voxmeter	May 19	24.7	24.4	17.9	5.6	6.1	7.5	7.1	3.9	0.9	1.6	0.3	45.2	54.5
Epinion	May 14	22.5	25.3	18.9	5.9	6.5	8.6	6.3	3.9	0.5	1.4	2.8	47.7	52.1
YouGov	May 13	20.5	25.2	20.3	6.9	5.3	8.0	7.5	3.9	0.5	1.8	4.7	47.2	52.7
Wilke	May 13	22.5	23.5	17.1	6.4	6.8	8.3	8.3	3.5	0.8	2.7	1.0	47.7	52.2
Norstat	May 12	21.9	25.4	21.1	4.9	5.6	8.1	5.9	4.2	0.4	1.7	3.5	45.7	53.5
Voxmeter	May 11	24.2	23.6	18.6	5.9	6.2	8.1	7.4	4.1	0.7	0.9	0.6	44.7	55.0
Gallup	May 9	23.4	23.6	19.7	5.8	6.6	8.6	5.9	4.0	0.6	1.5	0.2	46.1	53.6
Greens	May 5	21.9	25.5	17.8	6.6	6.2	9.1	6.0	4.8	0.6	1.2	3.6	48.6	51.1
Voxmeter	May 3	23.5	24.2	19.1	5.8	5.9	8.6	7.0	3.7	0.8	1.1	0.7	45.6	54.1
Megafon	May 1	19.5	24.6	20.8	6.1	6.0	8.7	6.3	4.8	0.8	2.0	3.8	47.4	52.2
YouGov	April 29	21.3	23.5	20.1	6.3	5.5	8.6	7.6	4.6	0.5	2.1	2.2	46.0	54.1
Voxmeter	April 27	23.7	25.1	18.3	5.8	6.7	7.9	6.6	3.6	0.7	1.2	1.4	46.7	52.9
Epinion	April 23	22.2	24.3	19.4	6.6	6.9	8.4	5.9	4.2	0.6	1.6	2.1	47.7	52.3
Voxmeter	April 19	24.2	25.5	18.2	6.4	6.5	8.1	5.7	2.9	0.7	1.5	1.3	48.0	51.7
Wilke	April 14	22.6	24.3	19.3	7.1	6.1	7.9	6.8	4.0	0.4	1.5	1.7	46.9	53.1
YouGov	April 13	19.8	23.3	21.9	6.8	5.2	9.5	6.7	4.0	0.9	1.9	1.4	46.3	53.3
Norstat	April 12	20.9	25.5	21.1	5.6	6.1	8.6	5.3	4.2	0.7	1.0	4.6	47.0	52.2
Voxmeter	April 12	25.1	24.8	17.7	6.6	7.0	7.5	4.9	4.1	0.4	1.5	0.3	47.4	52.2
Gallup	April 9	20.7	24.2	20.2	7.6	5.5	9.3	5.0	4.9	1.0	1.6	3.5	48.2	51.8
Voxmeter	April 5	24.5	24.1	17.1	7.1	7.6	8.0	5.6	3.8	0.3	1.7	0.4	48.1	51.4
Voxmeter	March 29	23.8	23.4	17.7	7.3	7.2	8.7	5.0	4.6	0.3	1.5	0.4	48.1	51.4
Greens	March 26	23.3	24.4	17.2	5.9	7.0	8.3	6.5	4.0	0.7	2.6	1.1	48.1	51.7
Megafon	March 25	24.2	22.6	19.1	7.9	5.4	7.9	5.3	4.4	0.9	1.8	1.6	45.6	53.9
Epinion	March 23	22.3	23.9	18.7	6.7	6.8	8.7	5.5	5.0	0.5	1.8	1.6	47.9	52.0
YouGov	March 23	21.5	19.8	22.4	6.7	5.4	9.5	6.5	5.0	0.8	2.5	0.9	43.9	56.2
Voxmeter	March 22	23.9	22.9	17.1	7.8	7.1	8.5	5.7	4.7	0.6	1.4	1.0	47.7	52.0
Norstat	March 15	23.0	23.7	20.4	5.9	6.6	7.1	5.9	5.0	0.3	1.4	0.7	44.7	54.3
Voxmeter	March 15	23.4	24.3	17.6	7.1	6.6	8.4	5.4	4.6	0.5	1.8	0.9	48.2	51.5
YouGov	March 9	19.8	21.5	22.6	6.8	5.6	8.1	7.1	5.2	1.1	2.2	1.1	44.2	55.8
Voxmeter	March 8	23.2	23.4	18.7	7.5	6.4	9.1	4.7	4.8	0.4	1.5	0.2	47.9	51.8
Gallup	March 5	21.1	23.1	20.1	6.9	6.0	8.4	5.8	5.3	1.0	1.8	2.0	46.2	53.3
Voxmeter	March 2	22.3	23.1	19.6	7.8	6.9	8.5	4.8	5.3	0.3	1.2	0.8	47.5	52.3

Polling Firm	Date	V	A	O	B	F	Ø	I	C	K	Lead	Red (A+B+F+Ø)	Blue (V+O+I+C+K)
YouGov	February 25	21.8	22.2	23.0	7.6	5.5	8.2	5.9	5.3	0.4	0.8	43.5	56.5
DR	February 24	23.7	22.0	21.7	6.3	6.3	8.9	5.7	4.9	0.7	1.7	43.5	56.7
Voxmeter	February 23	23.5	23.7	18.3	7.7	7.1	8.8	6.1	4.2	0.3	0.2	47.3	52.4
Megafon	February 19	23.0	21.6	19.6	6.7	6.5	10.0	6.4	5.0	0.5	1.4	44.8	54.5
Norstat	February 15	24.5	21.0	23.6	6.2	6.0	7.8	6.0	3.0	0.9	0.9	41.0	58.0
Voxmeter	February 15	22.6	23.8	19.1	7.5	6.8	8.8	6.2	4.5	0.4	1.2	46.9	52.8
Wilke	February 14	23.0	25.6	19.0	6.7	6.7	7.4	5.6	4.7	1.3	2.6	46.4	53.6
Voxmeter	February 9	22.6	23.6	19.7	7.8	6.5	8.7	5.5	4.8	0.4	1.0	46.6	53.0
YouGov	February 8	24.0	18.9	23.4	6.3	6.3	9.1	7.4	4.6	0	0.6	40.6	59.4
Gallup	February 5	22.7	24.2	20.0	6.6	6.2	8.6	5.6	4.3	1.0	1.5	45.6	53.6
Greens	February 2	23.1	21.7	20.0	6.9	7.1	9.8	6.5	3.5	0.6	1.4	45.5	53.1
Voxmeter	February 2	23.8	22.9	20.6	7.4	6.6	8.9	4.3	4.6	0.4	0.9	45.8	53.3
DR	January 31	23.6	22.9	21.2	7.1	6.7	8.5	5.0	4.4	0.6	0.7	45.2	54.2
YouGov	January 29	21.7	21.4	21.9	6.9	6.2	9.3	7.3	4.1	1.2	0.2	43.8	55.0
Megafon	January 29	24.8	20.8	20.7	6.5	6.6	8.8	4.3	5.3	0.9	4.0	43.7	56.3
Voxmeter	January 26	23.0	22.8	21.5	8.0	6.7	8.8	3.8	4.8	0.3	0.2	46.3	53.1
Norstat	January 20	22.7	23.7	22.1	7.4	5.3	8.5	4.6	3.9	0.9	1.0	44.9	53.3
Wilke	January 19	22.7	22.7	19.8	7.0	8.3	8.4	5.1	4.8	1.2	Tie	46.3	52.4
Voxmeter	January 19	23.4	22.2	20.7	8.3	7.4	8.6	4.2	4.4	0.5	1.2	46.5	52.7
Voxmeter	January 12	24.0	22.7	19.9	7.7	6.9	8.3	4.9	4.1	0.7	1.3	45.6	53.6
Gallup	January 9	23.0	22.8	20.3	6.7	6.7	9.5	4.9	4.5	0.8	0.2	45.7	53.5
Greens	January 7	25.1	22.4	19.2	7.6	5.0	8.8	5.4	4.6	0.7	2.7	43.8	55.0
2015
DR	December 27	24.0	21.0	19.8	7.5	7.4	9.7	5.6	4.4	0.6	3.0	45.6	54.4
Voxmeter	December 21	25.4	21.5	19.1	7.9	7.1	9.1	5.4	3.2	0.8	3.9	45.6	53.9
Voxmeter	December 14	25.3	22.2	18.8	7.4	7.9	8.6	5.1	3.4	1.1	3.1	46.1	53.7
Gallup	December 12	22.4	21.4	21.4	7.0	6.2	10.7	5.2	4.6	0.6	1.0	45.3	54.2
Wilke	December 7	22.9	22.3	18.1	7.7	7.4	8.9	6.4	5.6	0.7	0.6	46.3	53.7
Voxmeter	December 7	24.5	21.4	18.3	7.8	7.6	9.1	5.8	4.3	0.9	3.1	45.9	53.8
YouGov	November 30	22.8	17.8	23.3	6.3	6.8	10.2	6.8	5.3	0.8	0.5	41.1	59.0
Voxmeter	November 30	25.4	21.1	17.9	8.2	7.1	9.2	5.7	4.3	0.8	4.3	45.6	54.1
Megafon	November 27	20.9	19.8	21.2	8.3	6.5	9.4	5.9	6.2	0.7	0.3	44.0	54.9
Greens	November 26	24.4	20.3	18.5	8.3	6.3	11.0	5.5	4.9	0.4	3.2	45.9	53.7
Voxmeter	November 23	26.4	21.4	17.6	8.0	7.5	9.1	5.0	4.1	0.6	5.0	46.0	53.7
YouGov	November 16	23.2	21.0	21.2	6.1	6.2	9.7	7.7	4.2	0.7	2.0	43.0	57.0
Voxmeter	November 16	26.7	21.3	17.1	7.9	7.7	9.2	5.4	3.8	0.5	5.3	46.1	53.5
Wilke	November 9	23.6	24.1	19.0	7.0	6.9	7.8	5.9	5.0	0.7	0.5	45.8	54.2
Voxmeter	November 9	26.4	21.6	17.6	7.5	7.6	9.4	5.0	3.9	0.5	4.8	46.1	53.4
Gallup	November 6	23.9	20.4	20.8	8.4	6.6	9.5	4.5	4.8	0.6	3.1	44.9	54.6
Voxmeter	November 2	25.6	22.3	18.1	7.4	7.3	9.4	4.7	4.4	0.4	3.3	46.4	53.2
Greens	October 29	23.7	20.5	18.9	7.2	6.6	11.7	5.9	4.6	0.6	3.2	46.0	53.7
Voxmeter	October 26	25.0	22.9	17.8	7.9	7.9	8.6	4.1	4.8	0.5	2.1	47.3	52.2
Voxmeter	October 19	25.0	22.4	18.3	8.2	7.3	8.8	3.9	5.4	0.6	2.6	46.7	53.2
YouGov	October 19	23.4	20.6	20.4	6.9	6.3	10.6	6.2	4.5	1.1	2.7	44.4	55.6
DR	October 14	25.1	21.2	19.3	7.6	6.4	9.4	5.5	4.8	0.7	3.9	44.6	55.4
Voxmeter	October 12	25.5	23.3	17.7	8.1	6.9	8.6	4.2	4.8	0.5	2.2	46.9	52.7
Gallup	October 9	25.3	21.6	18.7	7.8	5.2	10.1	4.5	5.5	0.8	3.7	44.7	54.8
Voxmeter	October 5	25.2	22.5	18.3	7.9	7.0	7.8	4.9	5.5	0.4	2.7	45.2	54.3
YouGov	October 5	22.4	19.1	22.7	6.6	6.3	10.5	6.5	5.0	0.7	0.3	42.5	57.3
Greens	October 1	23.5	20.1	22.1	8.2	6.2	10.5	3.6	5.2	0.2	1.4	45.0	54.6
Voxmeter	September 28	25.8	21.7	17.7	8.4	6.7	8.4	4.7	6.1	0.4	4.1	45.2	54.7
YouGov	September 21	23.2	19.0	22.3	7.5	5.5	10.9	6.0	4.9	0.7	0.9	42.9	57.1
Voxmeter	September 21	26.5	22.1	17.1	7.8	6.9	7.7	5.9	5.4	0.3	4.4	44.5	55.2
DR	September 17	24.5	21.5	19.4	7.6	6.7	9.3	5.5	5.0	0.4	3.0	45.1	54.8
Voxmeter	September 14	25.9	22.7	17.7	7.2	7.2	8.3	5.3	4.8	0.4	3.2	45.4	54.1
Gallup	September 11	22.5	21.7	18.5	9.1	6.2	9.8	6.2	5.2	0.5	0.8	46.8	52.8
YouGov	September 7	23.5	20.0	20.5	7.3	5.6	11.4	5.6	5.8	0.3	3.0	44.3	55.7
Voxmeter	September 7	25.3	22.4	18.1	7.4	7.8	8.9	4.7	4.6	0.5	3.1	46.5	53.2
Voxmeter	August 31	23.4	22.1	18.9	8.9	7.3	8.8	4.6	5.3	0.4	1.3	47.1	52.6
Megafon	August 28	23.4	20.9	20.0	7.8	7.1	8.9	5.8	5.3	0.8	2.5	44.7	55.3
Greens	August 27	22.8	20.5	17.5	8.2	7.0	10.4	5.9	5.9	1.4	2.3	46.1	53.5
YouGov	August 24	21.1	20.5	22.5	7.1	5.6	10.8	5.7	5.7	0.8	1.4	44.0	55.8
Voxmeter	August 24	22.7	21.4	19.5	8.8	7.1	9.1	4.8	5.6	0.6	1.3	46.4	53.2
Voxmeter	August 17	23.1	20.8	19.7	8.6	7.5	8.3	5.1	6.2	0.4	2.3	45.2	54.5
DR	August 14	23.6	20.7	20.3	7.9	6.4	9.6	5.2	5.8	0.5	2.9	44.6	55.4
YouGov	August 11	23.0	19.2	22.7	7.2	5.9	9.8	4.8	6.5	0.8	0.3	42.1	57.8
Voxmeter	August 10	23.5	21,4	20.3	8.7	7.7	7.8	4.7	5.5	0.1	2.1	45.6	54.1
Gallup	August 7	23.8	21.3	19.4	7.7	6.5	10.1	5.1	5.2	0.5	2.5	45.6	54.0
Greens	July 30	21.6	22.0	20.9	9.1	5.7	8.1	6.6	4.8	0.9	0.4	44.9	53.9
Gallup	July 11	21.3	21.6	21.5	8.7	5.5	10.4	5.2	4.6	0.4	0.1	46.2	53.0
YouGov	July 6	20.9	20.2	24.3	7.9	4.5	9.6	6.3	5.6	0.8	3.4	42.2	57.9
Rambøll	July 6	22.7	21.6	20.4	9.0	6.0	9.6	5.3	4.8	0.6	1.1	46.2	53.8
Voxmeter	June 29	23.2	23.7	17.9	9.6	6.9	8.6	5.1	4.5	0.2	0.5	48.8	50.9
Megafon	June 26	20.7	22.4	21.4	8.9	6.0	9.9	4.8	5.3	0.6	1.0	47.2	52.8
YouGov	June 22	20.1	20.1	24.7	8.1	4.5	9.6	6.5	6.1	0.4	4.6	41.1	57.8
Voxmeter	June 22	22.1	22.8	18.7	10.1	6.8	8.4	5.5	4.7	0.4	0.7	48.1	51.4
Rambøll	June 17	21.7	23.1	19.7	9.2	6.5	8.1	5.5	5.8	0.4	1.4	46.9	53.1
Voxmeter	June 15	21.1	22.9	18.9	10.3	7.1	8.8	5.2	4.7	0.3	1.8	49.1	50.2
DR	June 13	21.6	22.3	22.1	8.0	7.5	8.3	4.7	5.0	0.4	0.2	46.1	53.8
Greens	June 10	19.8	23.9	21.1	9.0	6.7	9.2	4.4	4.9	0.9	2.8	48.8	51.1
Voxmeter	June 8	20.0	23.2	20.8	9.1	6.5	9.4	5.1	5.2	0.2	2.4	48.2	51.3
YouGov	June 8	21.1	19.2	24.1	7.7	5.1	10.8	5.8	5.8	0.3	3.0	42.8	57.1
Gallup	June 5	21.9	22.4	20.9	8.7	7.9	7.1	4.3	5.5	0.7	0.5	46.1	53.3
DR	June 2	20.1	21.4	23.8	7.3	7.2	8.7	5.4	5.8	0.3	2.4	44.6	55.4
Megafon	June 2	14.5	25.1	21.9	8.7	6.9	10.1	6.0	5.4	0.8	3.2	51.5	48.5
Voxmeter	June 1	21.2	22.7	20.1	9.1	5.6	9.7	5.6	5.1	0.4	1.5	47.1	52.4
Megafon	May 28	19.3	22.9	21.3	8.9	6.3	9.8	5.8	5.2	0.1	1.6	48.1	51.9
EP election	May 25	16.7	19.1	26.6	6.5	11.0	8.1	2.9	9.1	—	7.5	—	—
Voxmeter	May 25	22.1	22.6	19.2	9.4	5.4	10.2	5.8	4.8	0.3	0.5	47.6	52.2
YouGov	May 25	21.3	17.6	23.9	8.7	4.8	11.9	6.7	4.2	0.9	2.6	43.0	57.0
DR	May 22	24.0	21.3	20.1	8.3	5.6	10.2	5.6	4.5	0.5	2.7	45.4	54.7
Megafon	May 20	23.0	22.3	20.0	9.1	5.1	8.8	5.9	4.4	0.9	0.7	45.3	54.2
Voxmeter	May 19	25.9	22.2	18.2	8.3	5.7	9.1	5.8	4.1	0.3	3.7	45.3	54.3
Rambøll	May 18	24.0	18.9	18.9	9.5	6.4	10.7	6.3	4.6	0.7	5.1	45.5	54.5
Voxmeter	May 11	27.5	21.9	17.9	8.1	5.8	8.7	5.5	3.9	0.3	5.6	44.5	55.1
Gallup	May 8	23.9	20.3	21.7	8.0	5.9	9.8	4.8	4.7	0.7	2.2	44.0	55.8
Voxmeter	May 5	27.8	21.1	17.9	8.6	5.2	9.6	5.3	3.6	0.4	6.7	44.5	55.0
Greens	May 2	26.8	15.7	23.1	7.8	5.0	10.1	6.8	4.0	0.3	5.7	38.6	61.0
Voxmeter	April 28	28.1	20.0	18.8	8.7	4.8	10.5	5.5	3.1	0.3	8.1	44.0	55.8
Rambøll	April 26	22.7	21.5	18.7	8.5	5.5	10.7	6.9	4.7	0.8	1.2	46.2	53.8
Megafon	April 24	26.4	20.3	22.0	8.3	4.0	9.7	5.6	3.2	0.5	4.0	42.3	57.7
DR	April 22	26.9	19.6	20.3	8.7	4.4	10.7	4.8	4.1	0.4	6.6	43.4	56.5
Voxmeter	April 14	28.3	19.3	18.2	8.8	4.7	11.1	5.2	3.9	0.2	9.0	43.9	55.8
Gallup	April 14	25.0	20.2	20.9	8.0	4.3	11.0	5.1	4.8	0.4	4.1	43.5	56.2
Greens	March 31	28.4	20.1	17.9	9.1	4.6	10.3	4.5	4.0	0.4	8.3	44.1	55.2
Megafon	March 27	25.4	19.5	20.9	7.8	5.1	11.2	5.2	4.3	0.4	4.5	43.6	56.2
Rambøll	March 21	24.8	18.2	21.1	10.6	5.9	9.9	4.6	4.3	0.6	3.7	44.6	55.4
Voxmeter	March 19	28.1	19.1	18.5	9.5	4.9	10.5	4.4	4.6	0.2	9.0	44.0	55.8
DR	March 14	27.0	19.7	19.9	9.0	3.9	11.1	5.0	4.1	0.4	7.1	43.7	56.4
Gallup	March 10	26.6	19.2	21.8	8.6	4.8	10.9	3.5	3.7	0.8	4.8	43.5	56.4
Greens	March 3	26.8	19.3	19.4	10.4	3.7	10.3	4.5	4.4	0.4	7.4	43.7	55.5
Voxmeter	March 2	27.1	19.8	17.9	10.2	4.4	10.3	4.7	4.9	0.3	7.3	44.7	54.9
Voxmeter	February 24	27.6	20.5	18.1	9.9	3.8	10.1	4.9	4.5	0.3	7.1	44.3	55.4
Voxmeter	February 18	28.3	20.9	17.6	9.4	3.1	10.8	5.1	4.4	0.3	7.4	44.2	55.7
Rambøll	February 16	25.5	18.3	19.5	9.1	4.2	11.8	6.7	4.1	0.8	7.2	43.4	56.6
Voxmeter	February 9	29.4	20.1	16.7	9.1	2.4	11.7	5.3	4.7	0.3	9.3	43.3	56.4
DR	February 7	27.6	20.1	18.8	8.6	3.8	11.4	5.2	4.1	0.5	7.5	43.9	56.2
Voxmeter	February 2	28.7	19.9	17.1	8.9	3.1	11.6	5.2	4.6	0.5	8.8	43.5	56.1
Megafon	January 31	26.7	18.8	20.1	7.4	4.5	12.2	5.1	4.5	0.4	6.6	42.9	56.8
Greens	January 30	28.4	20.1	18.0	6.7	3.9	12.2	5.1	4.2	1.0	8.3	42.9	56.7
Voxmeter	January 13	28.3	22.1	16.6	9.5	3.8	9.2	5.2	4.7	0.8	6.2	44.6	55.6
Gallup	January 13	27.1	23.8	16.6	8.4	3.9	11.1	4.8	3.6	0.6	3.3	47.2	52.7
Greens	January 13	26.1	21.8	18.3	8.4	4.2	12.0	4.0	4.2	0.4	4.3	46.4	53.0
2014
Megafon	December 21	27.7	22.5	18.5	8.4	3.7	9.5	5.2	3.5	0.5	5.2	44.1	55.4
Voxmeter	December 9	28.0	22.6	15.2	8.3	4.6	10.6	5.7	4.1	0.5	5.4	46.1	53.5
Voxmeter	December 8	27.5	23.3	14.9	7.9	5.0	10.9	5.2	4.7	0.4	4.2	47.1	52.7
Gallup	December 6	27.5	22.7	15.6	7.7	4.6	10.8	5.0	4.7	0.7	4.8	45.8	53.5
Voxmeter	December 2	25.8	24.1	15.8	8.1	5.1	10.2	5.9	4.4	0.3	1.7	47.5	52.1
Voxmeter	November 24	24.9	24.7	15.3	7.5	6.0	11.5	5.7	3.9	0.2	0.2	49.7	50.0
Megafon	November 22	29.3	22.2	15.9	7.6	5.5	10.2	4.6	3.9	0.4	7.1	45.5	54.1
Rambøll	November 17	25.2	22.4	16.4	7.5	6.1	10.9	6.1	4.7	0.6	2.8	46.9	53.0
Voxmeter	November 4	28.6	22.9	15.2	7.2	6.9	10.4	5.2	3.1	0.3	5.7	47.4	52.6
Greens	November 4	27.8	21.7	17.3	6.3	5.3	10.1	5.5	4.6	0.6	6.1	43.4	56.4
Megafon	October 25	25.4	21.7	18.9	8.4	4.5	9.7	6.2	4.1	0.7	3.7	44.3	55.3
DR	October 24	26.4	21.6	19.7	8.2	5.2	9.3	5.6	3.3	0.5	4.8	44.3	55.7
Voxmeter	October 20	26.1	22.5	16.9	8.6	6.2	10.4	5.5	3.2	0.5	3.6	47.7	52.3
Megafon	October 13	26.3	19.2	19.1	8.8	5.6	9.9	5.8	4.8	0.4	7.1	43.5	56.4
Rambøll	October 10	26.7	24.2	17.6	6.7	5.6	9.1	4.5	4.5	0.9	2.5	45.6	54.2
DR	September 26	28.4	19.4	19.7	7.0	5.1	11.9	4.8	3.2	0.4	8.7	43.4	56.5
Megafon	September 25	29.6	18.7	17.5	9.3	6.3	8.9	4.5	3.7	0.6	10.9	43.2	55.9
Voxmeter	September 23	30.6	20.9	16.9	7.2	4.5	10.2	5.3	3.8	0.3	9.7	42.8	56.9
DR	September 19	31.4	21.4	15.6	7.4	4.9	9.5	5.8	3.3	0.4	10.0	43.2	56.5
Greens	August 28	29.4	19.3	17.5	8.4	5.8	9.9	5.4	3.4	0.6	10.1	43.4	56.3
Megafon	August 22	27.8	18.9	18.2	8.4	4.0	11.0	6.5	4.6	0.4	8.9	42.3	57.5
DR	August 19	29.3	18.9	17.8	8.7	4.9	10.2	5.9	3.9	0.4	10.4	42.7	57.3
Voxmeter	August 19	29.5	19.4	15.2	9.2	6.0	11.0	6.1	3.0	0.3	10.1	45.6	54.1
DR	July 30	30.1	20.8	17.2	8.7	4.2	12.0	5.1	3.9	0.3	11.7	45.7	56.6
Voxmeter	July 1	27.8	20.1	13.6	8.7	6.1	11.6	6.0	3.4	0.3	9.7	46.5	51.1
Voxmeter	June 17	30.9	18.5	14.2	8.7	5.7	12.1	5.7	3.7	0.2	12.4	45.0	54.7
Megafon	June 13	29.3	18.1	15.4	8.0	4.2	13.3	5.6	5.1	0.7	11.2	43.6	56.1
DR	June 13	30.8	18.1	14.6	8.8	6.0	12.6	4.3	4.2	0.4	12.7	45.5	54.3
Voxmeter	June 10	31.3	17.9	14.5	9.1	5.3	11.6	5.5	4.0	0.5	13.4	43.9	55.8
Voxmeter	June 4	31.6	17.7	14.6	8.9	5.2	11.8	5.2	4.1	0.5	13.9	43.6	56.0
Megafon	May 29	32.1	15.9	14.7	8.7	5.4	12.8	5.7	3.8	0.6	16.2	42.8	56.9
DR	May 28	29.7	16.5	15.1	8.2	4.7	14.6	6.3	4.6	0.3	13.2	44.0	56.0
Voxmeter	May 27	32.5	17.3	14.3	8.4	4.9	12.3	5.1	4.7	0.4	15.2	42.9	57.0
Greens	May 6	31.6	16.1	16.2	6.6	3.4	14.9	5.4	4.1	0.7	15.4	41.0	58.0
DR	April 29	30.6	16.3	15.7	8.2	4.1	14.9	6.2	3.7	0.3	14.3	43.5	56.5
Megafon	April 25	31.3	17.8	17.5	7.5	2.8	13.2	5.2	4.4	0.4	13.5	41.3	58.8
Voxmeter	April 22	32.2	17.9	16.3	8.6	3.7	12.2	4.6	3.7	0.8	13.3	42.4	57.6
Rambøll	April 20	33.5	15.6	14.7	9.1	4.3	12.8	4.9	4.2	0.9	17.9	41.8	58.2
Gallup	April 16	30.8	18.2	16.0	7.8	5.0	13.3	4.0	3.8	1.1	12.6	44.3	55.7
Voxmeter	April 15	32.5	19.2	15.2	8.3	4.4	10.9	5.4	3.4	0.6	13.3	42.8	57.1
Megafon	March 26	31.1	18.4	16.9	8.8	4.1	11.1	4.9	4.2	0.4	12.7	42.4	57.5
Voxmeter	March 26	32.4	17.7	16.2	7.8	4.1	12.3	5.2	3.4	0.6	14.7	41.9	57.8
Megafon	March 21	29.9	18.0	17.1	8.1	4.2	12.2	5.6	4.0	0.6	11.9	42.5	57.2
Rambøll	March 21	31.9	19.0	15.5	8.4	4.9	11.2	5.0	3.4	0.5	12.9	43.5	56.3
DR	March 14	30.0	17.2	17.3	8.9	4.6	12.0	6.1	3.3	0.6	12.7	42.7	57.3
Gallup	March 11	31.0	17.1	15.5	9.2	5.5	12.5	4.4	3.9	0.8	13.9	44.3	55.6
Voxmeter	March 6	32.1	20.5	14.3	7.7	5.5	10.0	5.6	3.9	0.3	11.6	43.7	56.2
Greens	March 1	30.3	17.2	15.6	8.7	6.1	11.1	6.2	4.0	0.5	13.1	43.1	56.6
Megafon	February 28	30.0	18.3	15.9	9.0	4.8	12.7	5.1	3.4	0.8	11.2	44.8	55.2
Rambøll	February 23	30.8	23.0	13.8	9.1	7.3	8.2	4.1	3.3	0.3	7.8	47.6	52.3
DR	February 14	31.3	19.9	15.7	7.8	6.4	9.5	5.3	3.9	0.1	11.4	43.6	56.3
Gallup	February 8	31.6	20.8	15.2	8.6	7.1	8.2	4.2	3.5	0.8	10.8	44.7	55.3
Megafon	January 24	31.7	19.2	14.3	9.3	7.4	8.2	4.7	4.2	1.1	12.5	44.1	56.0
DR	January 24	31.5	19.2	15.1	8.4	7.1	9.9	4.3	4.2	0.2	12.3	44.6	55.3
Rambøll	January 19	32.4	19.5	13.5	9.1	7.3	8.6	4.5	4.3	0.9	12.9	44.5	55.6
Gallup	January 14	29.9	20.5	14.5	9.9	6.2	10.2	4.5	3.5	0.5	9.4	46.8	52.9
Greens	January 11	33.0	18.5	15.6	8.9	5.5	9.9	4.9	3.5	1.0	14.5	42.8	58.0
Voxmeter	January 8	31.9	22.6	13.4	8.5	6.4	9.7	3.7	3.2	0.5	9.3	47.2	52.7
2013
Megafon	December 20	30.8	18.7	14.8	8.9	6.1	10.2	6.8	2.8	0.5	12.1	43.9	55.7
Voxmeter	December 17	32.5	20.2	14.6	8.8	6.2	8.6	4.2	3.7	0.6	12.3	43.8	55.6
Rambøll	December 17	32.4	21.3	12.6	8.5	7.8	8.4	4.6	4.0	0.7	11.1	46.0	54.3
DR	December 17	32.8	19.4	15.5	7.1	6.5	10.1	4.4	3.7	0.4	13.4	43.1	56.8
Voxmeter	December 10	32.7	20.5	13.9	8.7	6.6	8.7	4.5	3.5	0.6	12.2	44.5	55.2
Gallup	December 10	32.1	23.1	13.3	8.7	6.4	8.5	4.2	3.2	0.3	9.0	46.7	53.1
Megafon	November 29	29.6	19.8	14.3	9.4	6.2	11.3	5.9	2.7	0.7	9.8	46.7	53.2
Voxmeter	November 19	34.5	18.2	13.5	9.7	7.4	7.5	4.5	3.2	0.8	16.3	42.8	56.5
Rambøll	November 19	31.6	20.1	13.1	9.1	7.1	9.2	4.6	4.3	0.7	11.5	45.5	54.3
DR	November 16	32.3	19.1	15.2	8.1	7.5	8.4	4.8	4.0	0.6	13.2	43.1	56.9
Voxmeter	November 11	34.4	18.7	13.8	8.7	7.6	7.9	4.7	2.7	0.8	15.7	42.9	56.4
Gallup	November 9	30.7	19.8	15.6	8.3	7.5	8.7	4.3	4.1	0.8	10.9	44.3	55.5
Greens	November 5	33.9	20.6	14.7	6.9	6.1	8.5	4.7	4.1	0.3	13.3	42.1	57.7
Megafon	October 22	31.8	20.4	13.2	9.4	5.8	9.4	5.1	4.1	0.7	11.4	45.0	54.9
DR	October 22	31.6	19.9	14.7	7.8	6.8	9.1	5.1	4.2	0.8	12.7	43.6	56.4
Voxmeter	October 17	33.3	19.2	13.8	9.5	5.6	9.0	4.1	4.6	0.9	14.1	43.3	56.7
Rambøll	October 16	33.1	20.7	14.9	8.7	6.5	8.0	4.1	3.2	0.7	12.4	43.9	56.0
Greens	October 5	32.9	16.5	15.0	9.4	6.5	10.4	4.9	3.7	0.5	16.4	42.8	57.0
Megafon	September 20	30.7	20.2	14.5	8.3	6.6	10.0	4.7	4.2	0.8	10.5	45.1	54.9
Voxmeter	September 17	34.6	19.3	13.0	9.2	6.4	8.7	4.5	3.8	0.3	15.3	43.6	56.2
DR	September 11	33.5	19.0	15.1	7.5	5.7	9.9	4.9	3.5	0.9	14.5	42.1	57.9
Voxmeter	September 7	34.6	19.3	13.0	9.2	6.4	8.7	4.5	3.8	0.3	15.3	43.6	56.2
Greens	September 7	33.1	18.5	13.8	8.2	5.7	10.9	5.3	3.7	0.6	13.6	43.3	56.5
Gallup	September 6	31.2	20.0	13.4	9.0	6.5	10.5	4.3	3.9	1.1	11.2	46.0	53.9
Voxmeter	September 5	33.7	18.6	13.8	8.8	6.5	10.4	4.2	3.9	0.2	15.1	44.3	55.8
Megafon	August 29	33.0	19.3	13.1	8.5	6.5	9.4	4.3	4.7	1.2	13.7	43.7	55.3
Voxmeter	August 19	33.0	18.8	13.0	10.3	6.2	8.9	4.2	4.7	0.7	14.2	44.2	55.6
Rambøll	August 17	32.4	19.0	13.9	9.0	6.7	8.9	5.1	4.1	0.9	13.4	43.6	56.4
Gallup	August 11	32.2	20.7	12.4	9.4	6.1	10.0	4.8	3.6	0.5	11.5	46.2	53.5
DR	August 10	34.4	17.4	14.1	9.2	6.0	10.5	3.7	4.1	0.6	17.0	43.1	56.9
Megafon	August 10	31.1	19.8	13.9	9.3	5.8	10.8	5.4	3.7	0.2	11.3	45.7	54.3
Gallup	July 10	31.2	17.7	14.0	9.8	5.7	12.2	4.2	4.1	0.9	14.5	45.4	54.4
Voxmeter	June 27	34.9	15.9	13.3	9.5	5.4	12.3	3.6	4.3	0.8	19.0	43.1	56.9
DR	June 27	33.6	16.3	12.8	8.3	5.8	13.6	4.1	4.5	0.9	17.3	44.0	55.9
Megafon	June 27	33.4	17.3	12.4	7.8	5.2	13.9	4.7	4.4	0.7	16.1	44.2	55.6
DR	June 13	34.0	17.5	13.3	7.4	6.6	10.8	5.0	5.0	0.4	16.5	42.3	57.7
Voxmeter	June 12	34.0	16.8	13.2	9.9	6.8	9.5	4.5	4.4	0.6	17.2	43.0	56.7
Rambøll	June 9	34.1	17.5	12.6	8.7	6.6	10.0	4.9	4.8	0.8	16.6	42.8	57.2
Greens	June 8	35.0	17.1	12.0	9.3	5.9	11.6	4.2	3.3	1.0	17.9	43.9	55.5
Megafon	May 31	34.0	16.9	13.7	9.2	5.7	11.3	5.0	3.5	0.5	17.1	43.1	56.7
DR	May 25	32.9	20.5	12.9	8.6	6.2	8.7	5.5	3.9	0.6	12.4	44.0	55.8
Rambøll	May 14	34.0	20.3	12.3	8.6	7.0	8.5	4.5	3.7	1.0	13.7	44.4	55.5
Greens	May 11	34.0	19.3	12.9	9.9	7.4	8.1	4.4	2.9	0.5	14.7	44.7	54.7
Gallup	May 10	29.9	21.0	13.8	8.5	7.5	8.8	5.3	3.9	1.0	8.9	45.8	53.9
Megafon	April 25	32.5	20.2	12.7	10.6	7.7	7.6	4.6	3.4	0.6	12.3	46.1	53.8
Megafon	April 13	31.4	21.5	12.6	9.6	5.6	9.4	5.8	3.9	0.1	9.9	46.1	53.8
Gallup	April 11	31.8	22.5	12.1	9.3	6.3	7.9	4.8	4.6	0.6	9.7	46.0	53.9
DR	April 11	33.4	20.8	13.4	9.0	6.6	7.8	4.7	3.3	0.9	12.6	44.2	55.7
Rambøll	March 31	31.7	21.2	12.6	10.2	7.4	7.8	3.8	4.5	0.8	10.5	46.6	53.4
Megafon	March 29	32.2	19.8	13.3	9.3	5.9	9.2	6.5	3.4	0.3	12.4	44.2	55.7
Voxmeter	March 23	34.3	19.2	13.6	9.2	6.1	8.9	5.1	3.0	0.5	15.1	43.4	56.5
DR	March 22	32.1	20.6	13.3	9.4	7.9	8.4	4.4	3.5	0.3	11.5	46.3	53.6
Voxmeter	March 12	33.6	18.5	13.5	9.0	6.6	9.2	5.3	3.7	0.6	15.1	43.3	56.7
Gallup	March 12	31.8	23.1	13.2	8.8	6.6	7.7	4.6	3.3	0.9	8.7	46.2	53.8
Megafon	February 22	34.3	20.2	11.9	10.0	8.1	7.2	4.6	3.2	0.6	14.1	45.5	54.6
DR	February 15	32.4	22.4	12.2	9.5	7.2	6.7	5.1	4.1	0.4	10.0	45.8	54.2
Megafon	January 26	32.8	22.6	11.8	8.8	7.4	7.3	4.9	4.0	0.5	10.2	46.1	54.0
DR	January 10	32.4	22.0	11.8	10.2	8.3	7.2	4.5	3.1	0.6	10.4	47.7	52.4
2012
DR	December 21	32.5	22.1	11.4	9.0	8.1	7.8	4.8	3.5	0.8	10.4	47.0	53.0
Megafon	December 14	32.9	22.8	10.4	10.5	7.4	7.3	4.6	3.9	0.3	10.1	48.0	52.1
Megafon	November 24	32.2	23.0	11.4	10.5	7.0	7.5	4.7	3.3	0.5	9.2	48.0	52.1
DR	November 3	31.9	20.9	11.8	9.6	8.7	7.4	4.8	4.4	0.4	11.0	46.6	53.3
Megafon	October 26	33.1	22.9	10.5	9.7	7.9	7.1	4.1	4.0	0.8	10.2	47.6	52.5
Megafon	October 6	28.2	24.1	12.4	10.5	7.8	6.9	5.4	4.0	0.6	4.1	49.3	50.6
Election results	September 15, 2011	26.7	24.8	12.3	9.5	9.2	6.7	5.0	4.9	0.8	1.9	50.2	49.8

== See also ==
- Opinion polling for the 2019 Danish general election
- Opinion polling for the next Danish general election
