= Andrey Milekhin =

Andrey Milekhin Андрей Милёхин
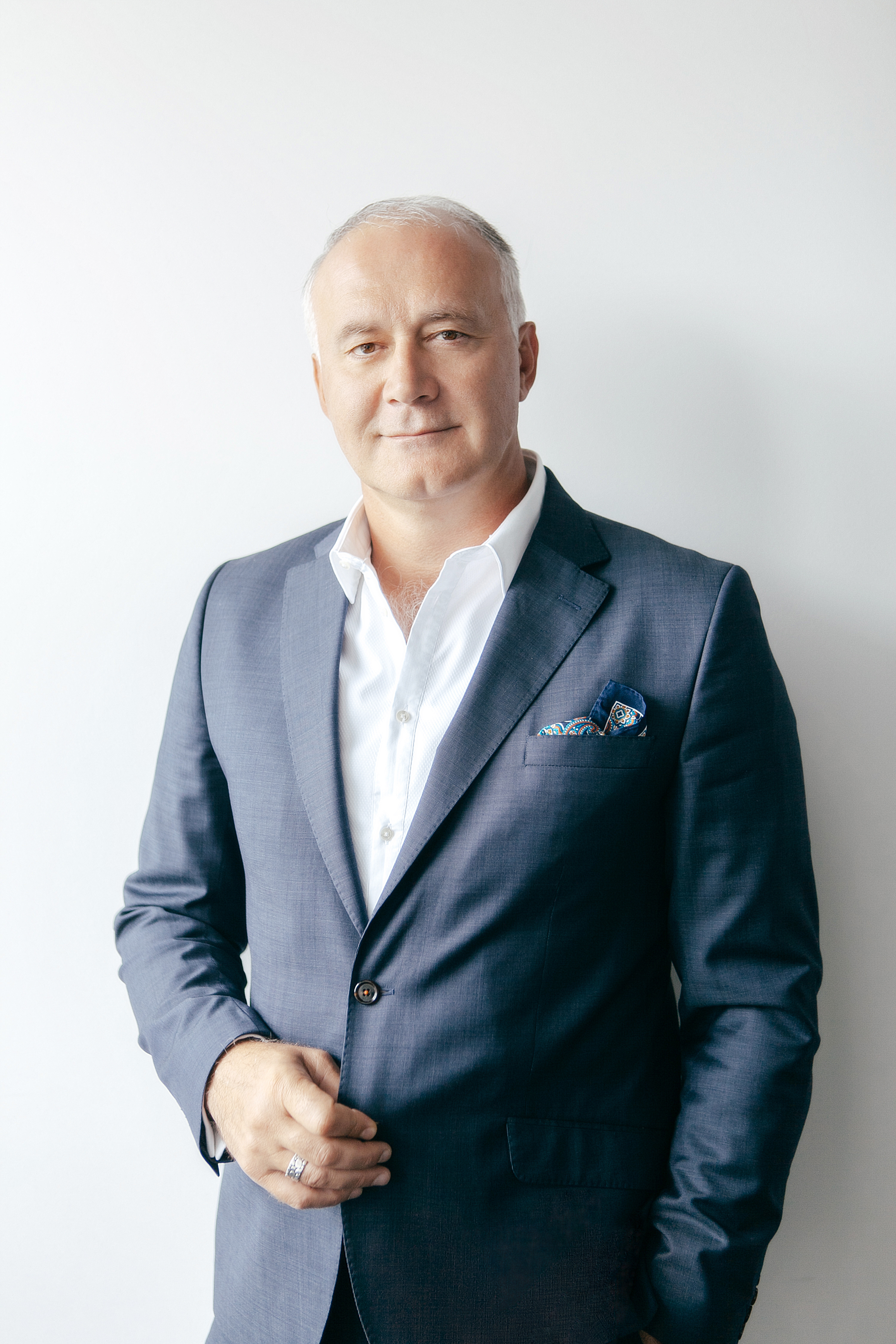
- Born: Andrey Vladimirovich Milekhin; Андрей Владимирович Милёхин; February 8, 1964 (age 62); Karaganda, Soviet Union
- Citizenship: Russia

Academic background
- Education: Saint Petersburg State University

Academic work
- Discipline: Sociology, Psychology, Marketing, Media, Golf, Go game
- Website: milekhin.ru, romir.ru, mile.ru, gallup-international.com

Andrey Vladimirovich Milekhin (Russian: Андрей Владимирович Милёхин, born February 8, 1964) is a Soviet and Russian scientist, who is engaged in practical psychology and sociology in the field of marketing, media and social-economic research. At present, he is the President of Romir research holding, VP of Gallup International, Doctor of Science, Candidate of Psychological Sciences, honorary member of Guild of Marketers Professor of School of Contemporary Social Sciences at Moscow State University, Member of Russian Academy of Natural Sciences (RAEN) and Eurasian Academy of TV & Radio.

== Biography ==
Andrey Milekhin was born on February 8, 1964, in Karaganda (USSR). In 1986 he graduated from the Department of Psychology at Leningrad State University n.a. Zhdanov (now Saint Petersburg State University), in 1995 he graduated from the post-graduate studies program at Russian Academy of Public Administration (now Russian Presidential Academy of National Economy and Public Administration) and defended a thesis on Psychology. In 1999 Andrey became a Doctor of Science {Sociology} in Russian Academy of Labour and Social Relations.

Andrey is married with four children.

== Professional and scientific activities ==
In June 1987, in Kaluga (Kaluga Oblast) Andrey Milekhin together with his partners set up the first in the USSR sociological cooperative "Potenсial".

In 1993 Andrey established the National Institute of Socio-Political Research (NISPR) in Moscow. This fact was recognized as one of the main events of the period of 1990–2010 years. The institute was engaged in media research and had the first Russian people meter panel. Then, in 1997, he set up the Agency of Society and TV and radio broadcasting Research (ASTR), which did consulting work in TV and radio sphere and carried out independent studies. In 1998 he became a cofounder and CEO of the Agency of Regional Political Research (ARPR). In 1999 Andrey set up Monitoring.ru, the agency of Russian Internet research, which studied the Internet audience and conducted online surveys. In 2000 the consolidation of NISPR, ASTR, ARPR and Monitoring.ru set up Monitoring.ru Group.

In 2002 he became the President of Romir monitoring Group, which was the follow-up scientific company of "Potencial". At present, Romir is the largest independent research holding in Russia in terms of total revenue. Since 2011, according to the international agency Research Rating Ltd., Romir has ranked among Top-100 research agencies in the world. According to the rankings, Romir is the largest independent research company in Central and Eastern Europe.

In 2014 Andrey was voted Vice President of Gallup International, an international association of polling organizations. In 2015 the product based on the panel data of Romir Scan Panel, which has been developed by Andrey Milekhin since 2007, was acknowledged as the most innovative one within the entire Gallup International network. He is also a member of ESOMAR, the professional association of marketers.

He is the former President of Russian Marketing Association, former board member of Soviet Sociological Association, former board member of Russian Sociological Association, former member of International Advertising Association. He is the honorary member of Guild of Marketers. In 2012 Andrey became the holder of an order "In recognition of marketing". He is also member of Russian Psychological Society, Russian Society of Sociologists, member of the commission on enterprising in the field of advertising in Chamber of Commerce and Industry of the Russian Federation, member of Russians Union of Journalists, expert with the council for administration of legislation of on advertising and for protection against unfair competition, affiliated to Federal Anti-Monopoly Service.

Member of Association of Graduates of Saint Petersburg State University.

Andrey Milekhin is a key member of the Russian Academy of Natural Sciences (RANS) and of the Eurasian Academy of TV and Radio Broadcast.

Since 2015 he has been the Professor of the High School of Contemporary Social Sciences in MSU.

== Hobbies ==
Andrey is keen on golf, basketball, yachting, Go (game), numismatics, quad biking and snowmobiling.

He is ex-chairman of Russian open golf tour "Tour 10". Member of Russian Golf Association, President of Golf Federation of Kaluga Oblast, member of Moscow City Golf Club, Moscow Country Club (Nakhabino), BlackSeaRama Golf Club (Bulgaria), European Golf Association.

In his youth Andrey Milekhin was in the junior basketball team of Belarus and junior basketball team of "Spartak" (Leningrad).

He participates in various regattas, including the business regatta of RBK

== Scholarly works ==
=== Theses ===
- Terms and factors of efficient diagnostics of social strain. M., 1995. – 153 p.
- Sociological monitoring is a mean of data intelligence in social systems. M., 1999. – 328 p.

=== Monographies ===
- Social psychological aspects of scientific-technological progress. Kaluga: Potencial, 1989.
- Issue of moral education of the youth. Kaluga: Potencial, 1989.
- Phone survey as a method of social-psychological analysis. Perestroika and social sciences. Kaluga, 1989.
- Conduction of social-psychological research in state security apparatus. Kiev, 1990.
- Terms and factors of efficient implement of psychological-innovative technologies into the system of social city administration. Moscow, 1993.
- Express-analysis of social strain. Russia's population monitoring. Moscow, 1994.
- Psychological expertise. Russia's population monitoring. 3 issues. M., NISPR, 1994.
- TV audience in Russia. TV audience weekly monitoring. 38 issues. Moscow, NISPR, 1994–1995.
- Measurement and analysis of TV ratings. M., 1997.
- TV and radio in Russia: hopes and preferences. M., 1997.
- Diagnostics in social administration. M., 1998. – 14 p.
- Sociological monitoring: essence and features. M., 1998 – 18 p.
- Electoral monitoring. M., 1999.
- Sociological monitoring. M., 1999. – 227 p.
- Social monitoring management. M., 1999.
- Milekhin A.V., Popov N.P., Yakunkina K.M., Bogomolova E.G. Russia's public opinion on social-political issues. Report on results of ARPR's research in 1999–2000 years. – M.: ARPR, 2000. – 761 p.
- Russia's public opinion: Report on research results. Monitoring.ru group. M.: MSU, 2001.
- Milekhin A.V., Osipov G.V., Lokosov V.V., Ivanov V.N., Nazarov M.M., Kublitskaya E.A., Orlova I.B., Sinelina Y.Y., Dzutsev Kh.V., Bogdanov I.Y., Shul'ts V.L., Merzlikin N.V., Zlotkovskiy V.V., ivanov A.V., kovaleva T.V., Selezneva I.A., Zubok Y.A., Chuprov V.I., Levashov V.K., Shushpanova V.S., Afanasiev V.A., etc. Russia: redevelopment of governance of society system. Moscow Institute of Socio-Political Research of the Russian Academy of Sciences, 2012 – 384 p.
- Osipov G.V., Beskhmelnitsin M.I., Rogachev S.V., Levashov V.K., Dekolarov S.V., Kravchenko S.A., Salygin V.I., Ivanov V.N., Komarovskiy V.S., Osadchaya G.I., Chuprov V.I., Bogdanov I.Y., Antipov E.A., Prokofiev S.E., Semenov D.A., Merzlikin N.V., Orlov V.B., Orlova E.B., Yanik A.A., etc. Russia in thee new social-political reality. Issue No. 3. Risks, strategy, optimization practice and forestalling. Moscow Institute of Socio-Political Research of the Russian Academy of Sciences, 2015 – 288 p.
- World-Eurasia-Russia. How to measure and understand with the use of sociology and psychology instruments. LAP LAMBERT Academic Publishing, Deutschland/ Germany, 2017.
- Sociological monitoring: usage and development in political, media and marketing research. Collection of essays. M.: FPFIS ISPR RAS, 2017. – 52 p. ISBN 978-5-7556-0576-2
- Milekhin A.V., Ivanov O.V.. Indices of the global world. M.: FPFIS ISPR RAS, 2017. – 341 p. ISBN 978-5-7556-0599-1
- Milekhin A.V., Ivanov O.V. Indices of the global world. - 2nd ed. M.: FPFIS ISPR RAS, 2019. – 380 p. ISBN 978-5-4469-1545-3
- Milekhin A.V., Ivanov O.V. Indices of the global world. - 3d ed. M.: 2019. – 420 p. ISBN 978-5-9500502-5-1
- Milekhin A.V. Gallup international. Voice of the people. — М.: 2019. — 100 p. ISBN 978-5-903633-00-5
- Milekhin A.V., Ivanov O.V. Indices of the global world. - 4th ed. M.: 2020. – 334 p. ISBN 978-5-4492-0145-4
- Milekhin A.V. Voice of the people: Russia, Eurasia, World. — М.: 2020. — 106 p. ISBN 978-5-4492-0164-5
- Milekhin A.V. World of human. Voice of the people — М.: 2021. — 134 p. ISBN 978-5-4492-0245-1

=== Abstracts ===
- Usage of psychodiagnostics methods upon studying and forming of youth's public opinion. Abstracts of the conference "Public opinion: studying and forming". – M., 1988.

=== Teaching aids ===
- Milekhin A.V., Sharkov Ph.I. Sociological monitoring of the media and electoral behavior. M.: Prometey, 2003. – 380 p.

=== Articles ===
- Company image. Acmeology. – 1994. – No.1
- Research of social aspects of political campaigns. Independent media measurements.- 1998.- No.5
- Electoral and media preferences monitoring. Abstracts of the conference "Contemporary electoral technologies" M., 1999.
- Informatization of social management. Practical marketing. – 1999. – No.6
- Media Measurement Statement. Independent media measurements.-1999.- No. 5
- Methodological fundamentals of social monitoring operation. Independent media measurements. – 1999. – No. 7
- Informatization of social management. Independent media measurements. M., 1999 No.8
- "Consumer behavior of Russians. Incomes and expenses. Expenditures and savings. Big-budget purchases and daily consumption." Information package of the international research-to-practice conference "Incomes, expenses and savings of Russia's population: trends and opportunities." Independent non-profit organization "Council on administration and development" ISESP RAS Moscow, p. 162-171, 2014
- Global polls of Gallup International: How does world media interpret the results of world public opinion research. Sociological research. – No.11. – 2016. – p. 54-60
- Our man in the Board of Gallup International Association. Teleskop.- No.2.-2016.- p. 49-51
