= Opinion polling for the 2019 Danish general election =

In the run-up to the 2019 Danish general election on 5 June 2019, various organisations carry out opinion polling to gauge voting intentions. Results of such polls are displayed in this article.

The date range for these opinion polls are from the previous parliamentary election, held on 18 June 2015, to the present day. The next general election was scheduled to be held on or before 17 June 2019, but on 7 May 2019 Prime Minister Lars Løkke Rasmussen announced that it will take place on 5 June 2019.

== Graphical summary ==
=== Blocs ===
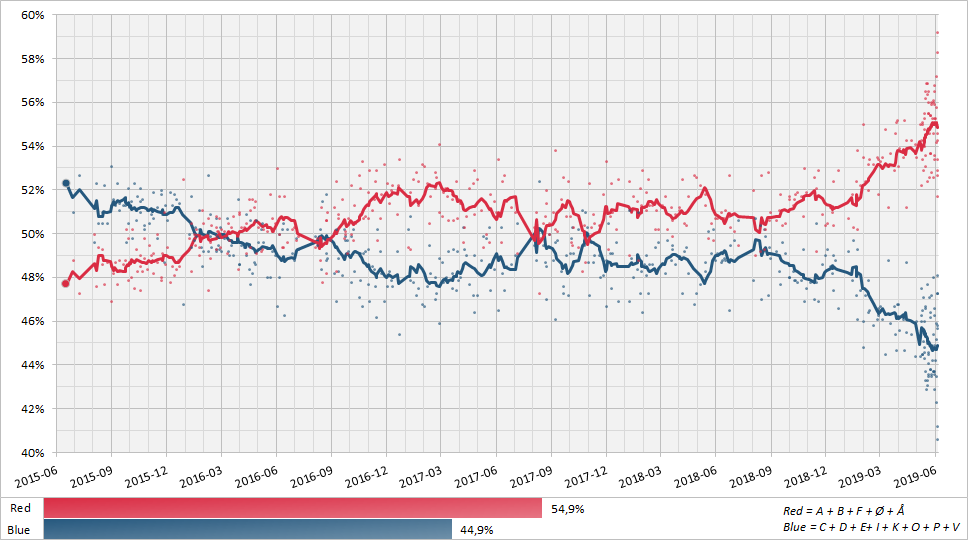
30 day moving poll average of the Danish opinion polls towards the general election in 2019, each line corresponds to a political bloc

=== Parties ===
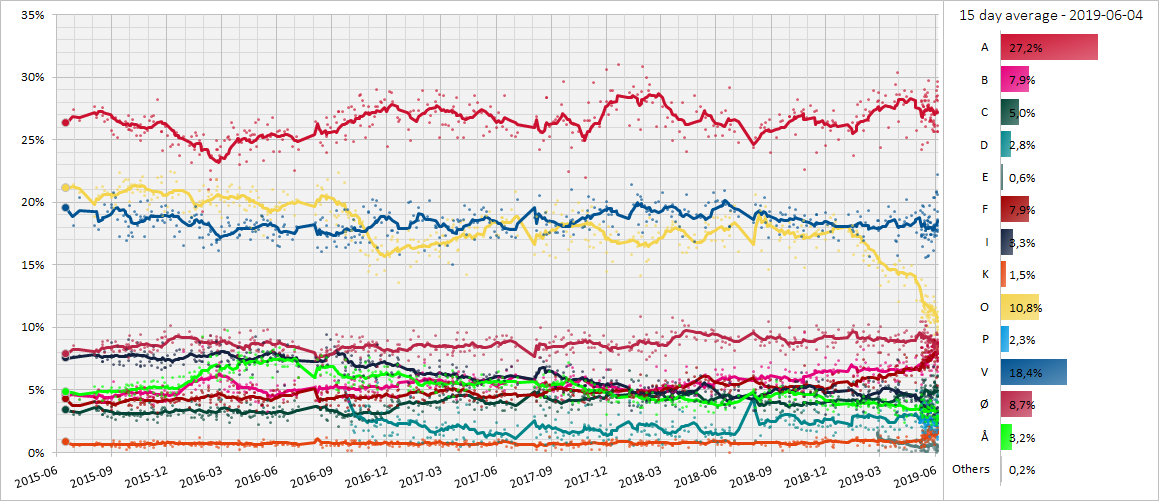
30 day moving poll average of the Danish opinion polls towards the general election in 2019

== Poll results ==
Poll results are listed in the tables below in reverse chronological order, showing the most recent first, and using the date the survey's fieldwork was completed as opposed to the date of publication. If such date is unknown, the date of publication is given instead. The highest percentage figure in each polling survey is displayed in bold, and the background shaded in the leading party's colour. In the instance that there is a tie between multiple parties, then the leading parties are shaded. The lead column on the right shows the percentage-point difference between the two parties with the highest figures. When a specific poll does not show a data figure for a party, the party's cell corresponding to that poll is shown empty.

=== 2019 ===
Poll source	Fieldwork period	Sample size	A	O	V	Ø	I	Å	B	F	C	K	D	E	P	Other	Lead	Blue	Red
General Election	5 June 2019	–	**25.9**	8.7	23.4	6.9	2.3	3.0	8.6	7.7	6.6	1.7	2.4	0.8	1.8	0.2	2.5	47.7	52.1
Epinion	4 June 2019	2,414	**25.7**	9.6	20.7	8.5	2.4	3.4	8.6	8.1	6.2	1.7	2.7	0.5	1.9	0.0	5.0	45.7	54.3
Gallup	4 June 2019	4,841	**25.7**	10.6	22.3	8.0	2.8	2.9	7.5	7.6	6.1	1.9	2.6	0.7	1.1	0.2	3.4	48.1	51.7
Voxmeter	4 June 2019	1,003	**29.3**	10.1	18.2	8.5	3.3	2.8	8.9	8.8	4.5	1.6	1.8	0.4	1.3	0.0	11.1	41.2	58.8
YouGov	31 May–4 June 2019	1,075	**27.3**	11.3	18.6	8.2	3.2	2.7	7.6	6.9	4.6	1.7	4.7	0.2	3.0	0.0	8.7	47.2	52.8
Norstat	3 June 2019	1,204	**28.6**	10.5	17.9	8.7	3.6	2.6	7.3	7.4	4.5	1.9	4.1	0.2	2.2	0.5	10.5	44.9	54.6
Voxmeter	3 June 2019	1,006	**29.7**	9.9	17.7	9.1	2.8	2.9	8.8	8.7	4.6	1.9	2.1	0.4	1.2	0.2	12.0	40.6	59.2
Greens	3 June 2019	1,162	**26.2**	10.5	18.7	8.3	2.8	4.0	6.5	8.4	5.2	2.0	3.3	0.5	2.8	0.8	7.5	45.8	53.4
YouGov	30 May–3 June 2019	855	**28.2**	10.6	19.3	9.5	3.6	3.0	6.8	5.4	4.8	1.7	4.0	0.2	3.1	0.0	9.9	47.2	52.8
Voxmeter	2 June 2019	1,006	**28.3**	10.7	17.4	9.5	3.0	2.7	8.4	8.3	5.0	1.8	2.5	0.3	1.6	0.5	9.9	42.7	57.2
YouGov	29 May–2 June 2019	776	**29.0**	8.3	20.8	9.6	2.2	2.4	7.9	6.0	5.2	1.7	4.1	0.0	2.9	0.0	8.2	45.1	54.9
Voxmeter	1 June 2019	1,005	**27.5**	11.1	17.8	8.9	3.4	2.9	8.7	7.8	5.2	1.4	2.5	0.3	1.8	0.7	9.8	43.5	55.8
YouGov	28 May–1 June 2019	870	**28.5**	8.5	20.9	8.3	2.8	2.3	8.4	6.7	5.4	1.4	4.3	0.2	2.4	0.0	7.6	45.9	54.1
Voxmeter	31 May 2019	1,009	**27.2**	11.6	17.9	8.8	3.2	3.3	8.4	7.6	5.5	1.2	2.2	0.4	2.2	0.5	9.3	44.2	55.3
YouGov	27–31 May 2019	979	**26.6**	9.0	20.3	8.6	2.9	2.8	8.6	7.6	5.2	1.5	4.2	0.4	2.4	0.0	6.3	45.8	54.2
Voxmeter	30 May 2019	1,011	**27.1**	11.1	17.5	8.4	3.0	3.6	8.8	8.0	5.6	1.6	1.7	0.8	2.4	0.4	9.6	43.7	55.9
Epinion	28–30 May 2019	1,719	**26.1**	10.6	20.4	8.5	2.7	2.8	7.1	8.9	5.1	1.8	3.1	0.7	2.2	0.0	5.7	46.6	53.4
Megafon	28–30 May 2019	1,013	**25.7**	12.1	19.5	8.8	3.5	3.5	8.3	7.3	5.3	1.5	2.2	0.3	1.9	0.1	6.2	46.3	53.6
YouGov	26–30 May 2019	978	**28.1**	9.5	18.3	8.5	2.6	2.6	8.4	8.9	5.3	1.3	3.5	0.7	2.4	0.0	9.8	43.5	56.5
Voxmeter	29 May 2019	1,011	**27.3**	10.4	17.7	8.6	2.8	3.4	9.1	8.4	5.6	1.5	1.4	0.7	2.8	0.3	9.6	42.9	56.8
YouGov	25–29 May 2019	981	**26.3**	11.3	17.3	8.7	2.6	3.3	8.0	9.0	5.7	0.7	4.3	0.6	2.4	0.0	9.0	44.8	55.2
Gallup	28 May 2019	1,476	**25.7**	11.0	20.4	8.6	3.0	2.9	6.8	8.6	6.9	1.4	2.9	0.8	1.6	0.0	5.3	48.0	52.0
Voxmeter	28 May 2019	1,007	**26.6**	10.7	18.2	8.3	3.1	3.7	8.7	8.8	5.2	1.6	1.5	0.9	2.5	0.2	8.4	43.7	56.1
YouGov	24–28 May 2019	978	**26.3**	12.5	16.2	8.8	2.7	3.5	6.9	9.1	6.2	0.9	3.9	0.4	2.6	0.0	10.1	45.5	54.5
Voxmeter	27 May 2019	1,005	**26.4**	11.2	18.1	8.7	3.6	3.4	8.8	8.7	4.7	1.1	1.7	0.9	2.4	0.3	8.3	43.7	56.0
European Election	26 May 2019	–	21.5	10.8	**23.5**	9.2	2.2	3.4	10.1	13.2	6.2	(Note: Ineligible to run)					2.0	42.6	57.4
Voxmeter	26 May 2019	1,005	**25.9**	11.7	17.8	9.0	3.9	3.4	8.5	8.5	4.4	1.3	1.9	0.9	2.3	0.5	8.1	44.2	55.3
Voxmeter	25 May 2019	1,006	**26.5**	11.7	17.5	9.4	4.2	3.4	8.5	8.2	3.9	1.5	2.0	0.6	2.1	0.5	9.0	43.5	56.0
YouGov	21–25 May 2019	991	**27.6**	11.8	16.9	8.1	2.9	2.3	6.6	8.2	6.2	1.1	4.0	0.7	3.6	0.0	10.7	47.2	52.8
Voxmeter	24 May 2019	1,006	**27.1**	11.1	18.0	9.0	4.4	3.8	8.2	7.8	3.4	1.8	1.9	0.7	2.3	0.5	9.1	43.6	55.9
Voxmeter	23 May 2019	1,006	**26.6**	10.4	18.4	9.3	4.6	4.2	7.9	7.4	3.2	1.6	2.1	0.7	2.8	0.8	8.2	43.8	55.4
YouGov	21–23 May 2019	981	**26.8**	11.3	17.5	9.4	2.7	2.5	6.2	8.8	5.0	1.2	4.3	1.2	3.2	0.0	9.3	46.3	53.7
Megafon	20–23 May 2019	1,001	**26.7**	11.6	17.5	8.1	4.3	3.4	7.7	7.8	5.4	1.7	3.2	0.6	1.9	0.1	9.2	46.2	53.7
Greens	22 May 2019	1,000	**26.6**	10.4	18.4	9.3	4.6	4.2	7.9	7.4	3.2	1.6	2.1	0.7	2.8	0.8	8.2	43.8	55.4
Voxmeter	22 May 2019	1,002	**26.1**	10.6	18.6	9.5	4.4	4.0	7.8	7.1	3.5	2.3	1.5	0.9	2.9	0.8	7.5	44.7	54.5
Gallup	21 May 2019	1,503	**27.4**	11.9	19.8	6.6	3.8	3.0	7.5	8.1	4.4	1.9	2.9	1.1	1.3	0.2	7.6	47.1	52.6
Voxmeter	21 May 2019	1,004	**26.5**	10.8	18.9	9.1	3.9	3.6	7.8	7.6	3.7	2.1	2.0	0.7	2.8	0.5	7.6	44.9	54.6
Epinion	18–20 May 2019	1,629	**29.8**	10.6	17.1	8.9	4.6	3.3	7.7	6.8	4.7	1.2	2.3	0.4	2.6	0.0	12.7	43.5	56.5
Voxmeter	18–20 May 2019	1,008	**27.5**	11.3	18.5	8.8	3.5	3.6	7.6	7.3	4.2	2.2	1.8	0.5	2.6	0.6	9.0	44.6	54.8
YouGov	16–20 May 2019	1,087	**28.2**	11.1	15.8	9.0	4.0	3.3	7.0	8.0	4.8	1.1	4.1	0.8	2.8	0.0	12.4	44.4	55.6
Norstat	20 May 2019	1,207	**28.8**	11.2	18.3	8.2	2.9	3.4	7.3	6.9	3.6	1.5	3.2	1.8	2.5	0.4	10.5	45.0	54.6
Voxmeter	19 May 2019	1,009	**27.9**	11.0	18.8	8.4	3.2	4.0	8.1	7.6	4.1	1.9	1.9	0.3	2.4	0.5	9.1	43.6	56.0
Voxmeter	18 May 2019	1,008	**27.7**	10.8	18.6	9.0	3.3	3.7	8.7	7.3	4.2	1.6	2.2	0.1	2.3	0.5	9.1	43.1	56.4
Voxmeter	17 May 2019	1,006	**27.8**	10.1	18.6	9.6	3.9	3.3	8.5	7.7	4.0	1.7	2.3	0.1	2.6	0.2	9.6	42.9	56.9
YouGov	13–17 May 2019	973	**24.8**	12.5	15.7	9.2	3.1	2.8	7.0	8.6	6.8	0.9	3.8	1.0	3.9	0.0	9.1	47.7	52.3
Voxmeter	16 May 2019	1,012	**28.5**	11.0	17.5	10.2	3.7	2.8	8.0	7.4	4.5	1.5	2.1	0.1	2.5	0.1	11.0	42.9	56.9
Gallup	15 May 2019	1,532	**26.1**	13.4	17.8	8.1	3.9	3.3	7.3	8.3	5.9	1.4	2.1	0.6	1.6	0.0	8.3	46.7	53.1
Voxmeter	15 May 2019	1,010	**28.2**	11.5	17.2	10.5	4.1	2.5	7.6	7.7	4.9	1.3	1.9	0.1	2.3	0.2	11.0	43.3	56.5
YouGov	15 May 2019	939	**26.7**	12.6	15.6	8.8	2.5	3.4	7.3	7.4	7.3	0.8	2.9	0.9	4.0	0.0	9.9	46.6	56.2
Voxmeter	14 May 2019	1,067	**28.7**	11.9	17.8	10.2	3.7	2.9	7.1	7.3	5.4	1.3	1.5	0.1	2.0	0.1	9.9	43.7	56.2
Epinion	11-13 May 2019	1,548	**27.1**	11.6	18.4	9.5	3.7	3.3	7.4	8.0	4.5	0.5	2.6	0.7	2.6	0.0	8.7	44.6	55.3
Voxmeter	13 May 2019	1,004	**28.5**	11.6	18.6	9.9	3.3	3.3	6.8	7.0	5.2	1.3	1.7	0.2	2.4	0.2	9.9	44.3	55.5
YouGov	8–12 May 2019	964	**29.1**	11.2	17.2	7.3	2.4	4.0	6.8	6.8	5.8	0.6	4.3	0.5	4.0	0.0	11.9	46.0	54.0
Voxmeter	12 May 2019	1,003	**28.2**	12.0	19.1	9.6	3.4	3.4	6.9	6.7	4.7	1.6	1.5	0.2	2.3	0.4	9.1	45.2	54.8
YouGov	7–11 May 2019	1,041	**27.7**	11.8	17.5	7.6	2.9	4.3	5.8	7.5	5.6	0.7	4.2	0.4	4.0	0.0	10.2	47.1	52.9
Voxmeter	11 May 2019	1,012	**27.7**	11.8	19.7	9.3	3.9	3.1	7.4	6.8	4.3	1.5	1.6	0.3	2.0	0.6	8.0	45.1	54.3
Norstat	10 May 2019	1,207	**27.3**	11.4	16.5	10.5	3.3	3.4	6.3	7.5	5.9	1.3	2.4	1.1	2.6	0.5	10.8	44.5	55.0
Voxmeter	10 May 2019	1,011	**27.9**	11.3	19.8	9.6	4.1	2.8	7.8	7.0	3.9	1.8	1.8	0.2	1.6	0.4	8.1	44.5	55.1
Megafon	8–10 May 2019	1,010	**24.7**	10.8	19.2	9.4	3.8	2.9	8.4	8.0	5.0	1.4	2.8	0.7	2.8	0.1	5.5	46.5	53.4
Norstat	2–8 May 2019	1,207	**28.2**	12.7	17.3	9.2	3.7	3.8	6.3	6.8	4.3	1.4	2.1	0.5	3.5	0.0	10.9	45.5	54.3
YouGov	5–8 May 2019	983	**26.5**	10.8	17.4	7.9	3.2	4.7	6.5	8.4	4.6	0.5	5.0	0.6	3.9	0.0	9.4	46.0	54.0
Gallup	8 May 2019	1,690	**24.3**	12.5	17.9	9.2	4.1	3.1	8.4	7.2	4.8	1.1	2.7	1.1	3.3	0.0	6.4	45.6	54.4
Megafon	7 May 2019	1,000	**25.2**	11.6	19.6	9.2	3.0	3.4	8.7	7.8	4.6	1.2	2.7	0.8	2.1	0.1	5.6	44.5	55.5
Greens	7 May 2019	–	**27.5**	12.2	19.4	10.5	4.8	3.2	7.1	6.7	3.5	1.0	0.9	0.2	2.4	0.6	8.1	44.4	58.2
Epinion	7 May 2019	1,616	**28.1**	13.9	17.5	8.9	3.6	4.3	5.5	7.1	5.2	0.4	2.9	0.2	2.6	0.0	10.6	46.3	53.8
Voxmeter	6 May 2019	1,045	**27.5**	12.2	19.4	10.5	4.8	3.2	7.1	6.7	3.5	1.0	0.9	0.2	2.4	0.6	8.1	44.4	55.0
YouGov	1–3 May 2019	1,656	**23.0**	11.2	17.1	9.1	3.3	3.4	6.6	8.6	5.9	0.9	6.3	0.8	3.9	0.0	5.9	49.4	50.7
Megafon	29 Apr–2 May 2019	1,008	**24.7**	12.6	18.4	9.8	3.3	3.5	8.8	7.5	4.2	0.5	2.6	1.3	2.7	0.1	6.3	45.6	54.3
YouGov	26–29 Apr 2019	1,890	**25.8**	12.2	17.6	9.4	4.2	3.8	6.7	7.8	5.0	0.9	5.0	1.1	(Note: Ineligible to run)	0.5	8.1	46.0	53.5
Voxmeter	22–28 Apr 2019	1,021	**27.5**	13.6	19.2	9.3	4.2	3.7	7.6	5.6	3.8	0.9	2.5	0.2	(Note: Ineligible to run)	1.5	8.3	44.4	54.1
Voxmeter	15–21 Apr 2019	1,031	**28.9**	15.0	19.0	9.3	4.1	3.1	6.8	6.2	4.3	0.9	2.0	0.1	(Note: Ineligible to run)	0.3	9.7	45.4	54.3
Megafon	15–17 Apr 2019	1,008	**25.1**	13.6	18.4	9.3	4.4	3.3	7.8	8.1	4.1	0.8	3.6	1.3	(Note: Ineligible to run)	0.2	8.1	46.2	53.6
Voxmeter	8–13 Apr 2019	1,023	**28.5**	14.0	18.8	9.8	4.8	2.9	6.9	6.2	4.1	1.3	2.2	0.2	(Note: Ineligible to run)	0.3	9.7	45.4	54.3
Epinion	3–9 Apr 2019	1,540	**29.0**	13.4	18.5	9.6	4.2	2.4	6.3	7.9	4.6	0.4	2.7	0.9	(Note: Ineligible to run)	0.0	10.5	44.7	55.2
Voxmeter	1–7 Apr 2019	1,030	**27.9**	14.8	18.3	8.6	4.4	3.4	7.2	6.4	4.6	0.9	2.8	0.3	(Note: Ineligible to run)	0.4	9.6	46.1	53.5
Greens	1 Apr 2019	1,078	**30.4**	14.4	15.8	9.0	4.0	3.0	5.8	7.0	4.6	1.2	3.3	1.0	(Note: Ineligible to run)	0.5	14.6	44.3	55.2
YouGov	31 Mar 2019	–	**26.5**	12.1	17.4	9.5	4.2	4.2	5.5	7.4	5.6	1.2	5.5	0.8	(Note: Ineligible to run)	0.1	8.1	46.8	53.1
Voxmeter	25–31 Mar 2019	1,056	**28.7**	15.4	18.7	8.3	4.0	4.0	7.2	5.7	4.3	0.9	1.9	0.4	(Note: Ineligible to run)	0.5	10.0	45.6	53.9
Norstat	29 Mar 2019	–	**28.7**	14.4	16.9	8.9	3.2	4.3	7.0	6.2	4.4	0.9	4.1	0.8	(Note: Ineligible to run)	0.2	11.8	44.7	55.1
Megafon	25–28 Mar 2019	1,006	**25.4**	12.6	17.3	9.1	4.8	3.7	8.1	7.2	5.4	1.1	3.8	1.3	(Note: Ineligible to run)	0.2	8.1	46.3	53.5
Epinion	18–25 Mar 2019	1,509	**29.5**	15.1	17.0	9.4	3.9	3.1	5.7	6.9	5.2	0.5	3.1	0.6	(Note: Ineligible to run)	0.0	12.5	45.4	54.6
Voxmeter	18–24 Mar 2019	1,044	**28.1**	15.1	19.3	8.8	4.3	3.4	6.7	5.9	4.5	0.7	1.9	0.9	(Note: Ineligible to run)	0.4	9.2	46.7	52.9
Voxmeter	11–17 Mar 2019	1,062	**27.7**	14.6	18.9	9.2	4.9	3.6	7.0	6.2	4.1	0.5	2.1	0.8	(Note: Ineligible to run)	0.4	8.8	45.9	53.7
Gallup	8–14 Mar 2019	1,587	**26.0**	13.7	19.7	7.9	5.4	3.7	6.9	6.7	5.2	0.9	2.6	1.3	(Note: Ineligible to run)	0.0	6.3	48.8	51.2
Voxmeter	4–9 Mar 2019	1,037	**28.6**	14.2	18.6	9.0	5.3	4.3	7.2	5.7	3.8	0.4	1.7	0.5	(Note: Ineligible to run)	0.7	10.0	44.5	54.8
Voxmeter	3 Mar 2019	–	**28.0**	14.6	18.1	8.6	5.7	4.3	6.7	5.9	4.1	0.9	2.1	0.6	(Note: Ineligible to run)	0.4	9.9	46.1	53.5
YouGov	1–3 Mar 2019	1,738	**26.7**	15.5	15.9	8.8	5.0	4.2	6.1	5.9	4.7	0.9	4.9	1.3	(Note: Ineligible to run)	0.1	8.1	48.2	51.7
Megafon	25–28 Feb 2019	1,009	**24.4**	13.4	18.0	10.1	5.4	3.8	7.0	8.0	3.8	1.4	3.4	1.3	(Note: Ineligible to run)	0.0	6.4	46.7	53.3
Norstat	26 Feb 2019	1,205	**28.8**	15.7	18.6	8.0	4.0	3.2	5.6	6.2	4.1	1.1	2.6	0.2	(Note: Ineligible to run)	1.9	10.2	46.3	51.8
Epinion	19–25 Feb 2019	1,532	**28.2**	15.2	17.8	9.7	4.5	3.5	6.1	5.9	3.8	0.7	2.8	1.8	(Note: Ineligible to run)	0.0	10.4	46.6	53.4
Voxmeter	18–24 Feb 2019	1,032	**28.1**	14.8	18.6	9.1	5.0	3.7	6.7	5.9	3.6	0.7	2.0	1.4	(Note: Ineligible to run)	0.4	9.5	46.1	53.5
Voxmeter	11–17 Feb 2019	1,022	**29.0**	15.4	18.1	8.6	5.7	4.1	6.3	5.2	3.6	1.1	1.9	(Note: Ineligible to run)	(Note: Ineligible to run)	1.0	10.9	45.8	53.2
Voxmeter	4–9 Feb 2019	1,032	**28.3**	15.8	17.9	8.6	6.0	3.7	6.8	5.8	3.8	1.0	1.9	(Note: Ineligible to run)	(Note: Ineligible to run)	0.4	10.4	46.4	53.2
Voxmeter	28 Jan–3 Feb 2019	1,045	**27.5**	16.2	18.4	9.0	5.3	3.2	7.2	5.5	4.2	1.1	2.0	(Note: Ineligible to run)	(Note: Ineligible to run)	0.4	9.1	47.2	52.4
Megafon	28–31 Jan 2019	1,007	**25.8**	15.8	17.0	8.9	3.3	4.5	8.3	7.5	4.7	0.8	3.2	(Note: Ineligible to run)	(Note: Ineligible to run)	0.2	8.8	44.8	55.0
Voxmeter	21–27 Jan 2019	1,039	**28.1**	16.8	18.9	8.5	4.6	3.7	6.9	5.0	4.0	0.9	2.2	(Note: Ineligible to run)	(Note: Ineligible to run)	0.4	9.2	47.4	52.2
Norstat	22 Jan 2019	1,207	**26.4**	17.6	19.3	7.9	4.3	4.2	5.3	6.4	3.8	1.2	3.1	(Note: Ineligible to run)	(Note: Ineligible to run)	0.5	7.1	49.3	50.2
Epinion	14–21 Jan 2019	1,745	**27.9**	16.6	17.5	8.9	4.6	4.1	6.2	6.7	4.0	0.6	2.8	(Note: Ineligible to run)	(Note: Ineligible to run)	0.1	10.4	46.1	53.8
Voxmeter	14–20 Jan 2019	1,032	**26.9**	17.8	18.3	8.8	4.3	3.6	7.5	5.6	3.5	1.2	2.1	(Note: Ineligible to run)	(Note: Ineligible to run)	0.4	8.6	47.2	52.4
YouGov	11–14 Jan 2019	1,917	**23.8**	15.9	17.7	10.2	4.6	4.0	6.2	6.1	4.8	1.0	5.7	(Note: Ineligible to run)	(Note: Ineligible to run)	0.0	6.1	49.7	50.3
Voxmeter	7–12 Jan 2019	1,027	**26.4**	18.2	17.9	9.9	4.7	3.8	6.9	4.8	4.1	1.1	1.9	(Note: Ineligible to run)	(Note: Ineligible to run)	0.3	8.2	47.9	51.8
Voxmeter	2–6 Jan 2019	1,048	**25.8**	17.7	19.1	9.6	5.2	3.7	6.6	5.0	4.3	0.8	2.1	(Note: Ineligible to run)	(Note: Ineligible to run)	0.2	6.7	49.2	50.7

=== 2018 ===
Poll source	End date	A	O	V	Ø	I	Å	B	F	C	K	D	Lead	Blue	Red
Megafon	20 Dec 2018	25.1	16.2	17.0	9.9	4.9	4.1	7.4	6.4	4.5	0.9	3.1	7.9	47.1	52.9
Voxmeter	17 Dec 2018	26.4	18.5	18.7	8.8	5.4	3.8	7.1	5.1	3.6	1	1.6	7.7	48.8	51.2
Gallup	13 Dec 2018	26.4	18.3	18.3	8.4	5.4	3.3	6.7	5.6	4.9	0.7	1.4	8.1	49.0	50.4
Norstat	11 Dec 2018	26.6	17.6	18.2	8.8	5.2	4.5	4.8	6.3	3.9	0.5	2.8	9.0	48.2	51.1
Voxmeter	8 Dec 2018	25.8	18.8	17.7	9.3	4.6	3.8	6.6	5.7	4.2	1.0	2.2	7.0	48.5	51.2
Voxmeter	2 Dec 2018	26.5	18.2	18.3	8.5	5.1	3.5	6.2	5.8	4.5	1.1	2.1	8.2	49.3	50.5
Greens	29 Nov 2018	24.6	17.1	19.2	9.6	3.1	3.8	7.6	4.8	4.6	1.2	3.8	5.4	49.0	50.4
Voxmeter	25 Nov 2018	26.0	17.7	17.8	9.6	5.9	3.8	6.6	4.9	4.0	1.1	2.1	8.2	48.6	50.9
Voxmeter	18 Nov 2018	26.5	17.9	17.3	9.9	5.7	4.0	7.1	5.4	3.2	0.6	2.2	8.6	46.9	52.9
Epinion	16 Nov 2018	26.5	17.5	18.3	10.2	4.1	4.1	6.0	5.3	4.1	0.5	3.3	8.2	47.3	52.1
Gallup	15 Nov 2018	27.4	16.4	19.1	8.3	5.1	5.0	5.9	5.0	4.8	0.9	1.7	8.3	48.0	51.6
Norstat	14 Nov 2018	24.0	17.7	19.1	9.1	4.7	4.4	6.4	5.3	3.9	1.2	3.9	4.9	50.5	49.2
Voxmeter	11 Nov 2018	27.3	17.4	18.1	9.1	4.5	4.8	6.6	4.8	3.5	0.9	2.6	9.2	47.0	52.6
Voxmeter	4 Nov 2018	27.8	18.1	18.7	8.9	4.8	4.2	6.0	4.9	3.9	0.5	1.8	9.1	47.8	51.8
Voxmeter	28 Oct 2018	26.8	17.5	18.2	8.4	5.7	4.7	6.4	5.6	3.8	0.5	1.8	8.6	47.5	51.9
Megafon	22-25 Oct 2018	22.7	14.8	19.0	9.7	4.5	4.0	9.6	7.0	5.3	0.7	2.6	3.7	46.6	53.4
Norstat	9 Oct 2018	27.2	16.9	19.0	9.2	5.3	4.3	5.8	5.1	3.3	0.8	2.6	8.2	47.9	51.6
Greens	1 Oct 2018	26.9	16.4	19.6	10.0	4.1	3.9	5.0	5.9	4.5	0.5	2.9	7.5	48.0	51.7
Voxmeter	22 Sep 2018	27.3	18.2	17.3	8.6	6.4	5.3	5.6	4.9	3.2	0.9	1.9	9.1	47.9	51.7
Norstat	11 Sep 2018	27.1	17.0	17.5	9.5	4.1	5.8	4.5	4.9	4.4	0.7	4.6	9.6	48.3	51.1
Voxmeter	3 Sep 2018	26.2	17.7	18.7	9.1	5.2	5.8	5.4	5.0	3.9	0.9	1.7	7.5	48.1	51.5
YouGov	24-26 Aug 2018	25.7	14.7	17.2	10.5	5.4	4.4	6.8	5.4	4.9	0.8	4.2	8.5	47.2	52.8
Voxmeter	20-26 Aug 2018	26.7	18.3	19.3	8.8	5.1	5.0	5.8	4.3	3.9	0.8	2.0	7.4	49.4	50.6
Epinion	20 Aug 2018	26.4	19.7	18.4	9.1	4.5	4.5	5.6	4.6	4.1	0.6	2.6	5.6	49.5	50.5
Voxmeter	20 Aug 2018	26.0	18.9	20.4	8.6	4.5	4.8	5.3	4.6	3.4	0.8	2.2	5.6	50.2	49.3
Voxmeter	Aug 13, 2018	26.0	19.4	19.8	8.6	5.2	4.2	5.2	5.3	3.8	0.8	1.4	6.2	50.4	49.3
Voxmeter	Jul 31, 2018	25.2	20.7	19.9	9.1	4.8	3.6	6.0	5.1	3.4	0.9	1.0	4.5	50.7	49.0
Voxmeter	June 16, 2018	27.4	18.9	19.9	8.8	4.5	3.5	6.1	5.3	3.6	0.9	1.0	7.5	48.8	51.1
Greens	11 June 2018	25.4	17.0	20.1	8.9	4.1	4.1	6.7	5.6	4.7	1.0	1.9	5.3	48.8	50.7
Voxmeter	10 June 2018	27.2	18.7	19.7	8.4	4.0	4.0	6.3	5.1	4.4	0.7	1.2	7.5	48.7	51
Norstat	27 May 2018	26.9	17.0	19.2	9.9	4.5	4.1	4.7	4.9	5.2	0.9	2.3	7.7	48.2	50.5
Voxmeter	21 May 2018	26.2	18.8	20.8	9.8	4.2	3.2	5.3	5.2	4.3	1.1	1.0	5.4	50.2	49.7
Voxmeter	May 19, 2018	25.3	18.3	20.0	9.4	5.2	3.3	6.0	5.8	4.0	1.1	1.5	5.3	50.1	49.8
Voxmeter	April 8–15, 2018	26.3	16.4	19.3	10.2	5.8	4.1	5.2	5.9	4.6	0.4	1.7	7.0	48.2	51.7
Voxmeter	2–7 April 2018	25.2	17.4	19.5	10.2	4.7	4.5	5.6	5.0	4.9	0.9	1.8	5.7	49.2	50.5
Voxmeter	26–31 March 2018	26.7	18.1	19.1	9.4	4.9	4.1	5.6	5.3	4.7	0.8	1.3	7.5	48.9	51.1
Voxmeter	19–25 March 2018	27.1	18.4	18.5	9.6	5.6	3.9	4.9	5.4	3.7	1.1	1.3	8.6	48.6	50.9
Epinion	14–20 March 2018	26.5	18.3	19.9	10.8	3.9	3.9	4.8	4.6	4.1	0.6	2.5	6.6	49.3	50.6
Norstat	14–20 March 2018	25.0	18.5	19.3	9.2	4.3	4.6	5.7	5.4	4.7	0.6	2.1	5.7	49.5	49.9
Voxmeter	12–18 March 2018	28.0	18.0	18.9	9.7	5.1	4.1	4.4	5.0	4.7	0.7	1.4	9.1	48.8	51.2
Voxmeter	5–11 March 2018	26.8	18.0	19.5	8.8	5.6	4.5	4.9	5.2	4.3	0.8	1.5	7.5	49.7	50.2
Voxmeter	19–25 February 2018	28.6	17.6	20.1	8.8	5.8	4.0	4.5	4.3	4.4	0.6	1.1	8.5	49.6	50.2
Megafon	19–22 February 2018	26.1	16.9	18.5	9.6	4.1	3.1	6.9	5.4	5.3	1.0	2.5	7.6	48.3	51.1
Voxmeter	12–18 February 2018	28.4	18.2	20.0	8.2	4.8	4.1	5.0	4.5	4.0	0.9	1.5	8.4	49.4	50.2
Epinion	8–14 February 2018	28.0	17.2	18.7	8.0	5.3	4.8	5.1	5.4	4.6	0.7	2.1	9.3	48.6	51.3
Voxmeter	5–10 February 2018	29.5	18.8	19.1	7.7	4.3	4.0	5.1	5.0	4.1	0.9	1.4	10.4	48.6	51.3
Gallup	2–8 February 2018	29.0	15.5	19.4	9.1	5.2	4.3	5.2	4.9	4.8	0.9	1.5	9.6	48.6	52.5
Greens	1 February 2018	28.2	16.5	19.8	9.1	5.2	4.3	5.1	4.5	4.6	0.7	1.8	8.4	48.6	51.2
Voxmeter	29 January 2018	30.0	18.2	19.3	7.5	4.2	4.8	5.0	4.6	4.0	0.9	1.5	10.7	48.1	51.9
Norstat	24–29 January 2018	30.9	16.7	17.6	8.8	4.8	3.6	4.6	5.0	4.1	0.9	2.3	13.3	46.4	52.9
Megafon	22–25 January 2018	25.9	14.2	20.5	10.9	4.8	3.6	5.4	6.3	3.6	1.0	3.2	4.4	47.3	52.1
YouGov	19–22 January 2018	28.1	17.0	19.7	8.6	4.7	4.5	4.8	4.7	4.9	0.7	2.3	8.4	48.6	50.7
Voxmeter	8–14 January 2018	29.3	17.3	19.9	9.3	5.7	4.1	4.6	4.4	3.8	0.7	0.6	9.4	48.0	51.7
Gallup	5–11 January 2018	28.5	15.9	21.5	8.3	3.4	5.1	4.4	4.7	5.9	0.7	1.5	7.0	48.9	51.0
Voxmeter	2–7 January 2018	28.8	17.1	19.1	8.8	5.1	4.9	5.4	4.5	4.0	0.5	1.1	9.7	46.9	52.4

=== 2017 ===
Poll source	End date	A	O	V	Ø	I	Å	B	F	C	K	D	Lead	Blue	Red
Local elections	Nov 21, 2017	32.4	8.7	23.1	6.0	2.6	2.9	4.6	5.7	8.8	0.6	0.9	9.3	44.7	51.7
Voxmeter	6-9 Nov 2017	26.8	17.5	19.6	8.4	5.3	5.5	5.3	4.5	5.0	0.8	0.8	7.2	49.0	50.5
Gallup	3-9 Nov 2017	29.6	16.4	20.3	6.7	4.6	4.7	4.7	5.2	4.8	0.8	1.8	9.3	48.7	50.9
Voxmeter	30 Oct – 5 Nov 2017	26.1	19.7	19.0	8.4	5.9	5.6	5.5	4.7	3.9	0.3	0.8	6.4	49.6	50.3
Greens	27 Oct – 2 Nov 2017	26.4	15.6	18.2	9.3	5.2	5.6	6.4	6.1	4	0.4	2.7	8.2	46.1	53.8
Norstat	24-31 Oct 2017	28.0	17.0	20.5	8.4	5.1	4.5	4.3	4.5	3.9		2.2	7.5	48.7	49.7
Voxmeter	23-29 Oct 2017	26.6	19.2	19.4	8.8	5.8	4.7	4.8	4.7	3.9	0.8	1.2	7.2	50.3	49.6
Epinion	Oct 17-24, 2017	26.6	18.1	18.1	9.6	5.4	4.8	5.4	4.0	4.7	0.9	2.3	8.5	49.5	50.4
Megafon	23-26 Oct 2017	22.0	17.1	18.6	9.1	5.4	5.8	6.1	5.7	5.4	0.7	3.8	3.4	51.0	48.7
Voxmeter	Oct 16-22, 2017	25.0	19.4	18.0	9.1	6.5	5.0	5.1	4.1	4.5	1.0	1.7	5.6	51.1	48.3
Voxmeter	Oct 9-15, 2017	25.7	20.0	19.2	9.0	5.4	4.0	5.8	4.9	3.5	0.5	1.5	5.7	50.2	49.4
Gallup	Oct 3-5, 2017	25.6	19.4	18.7	8.4	5.9	4.0	6.8	4.7	3.9	0.7	1.7	6.2	50.3	49.5
Greens	Oct 3, 2017	24.4	16.9	21.1	9.5	5.0	5.7	5.1	4.9	3.5	0.9	2.4	3.3	49.8	49.6
Voxmeter	Sep 25-Oct 1, 2017	26.5	17.3	18.6	8.3	7.1	5.0	6.1	4.9	4.5	0.8	0.8	7.9	49.1	50.8
Megafon	25-28 Sep 2017	22.5	16.3	18.2	9.8	4.2	7.2	7.0	5.9	4.7	0.6	3.2	4.3	47.2	52.4
Epinion	13-19 Sep 2017	29.7	18.2	17.7	9.2	4.8	4.7	4.2	4.8	5.0	1.6	0.8	11.5	47.3	52.2
Voxmeter	18-24 Sep 2017	26.3	17.7	18.9	7.9	6.9	6.0	5.6	5.0	4.1	0.6	0.8	7.4	49.0	50.8
Norstat	12-19 Sep 2017	26.6	18.3	17.4	8.4	6.4	6.2	5.0	5.1	4.1		1.4	8.3	47.6	51.3
Voxmeter	11-17 Sep 2017	27.9	19.1	18.3	9.1	5.9	5.7	4.9	4.3	3.6	0.3	1.1	8.8	48.3	51.6
Greens	1-7 Sep 2017	26.4	15.6	18.2	9.3	5.2	5.6	6.4	6.1	4.0	0.4	2.7	8.2	46.1	53.8
Voxmeter	21–27 August 2017	26.1	18.4	18.6	8.8	6.9	5.0	5.1	5.5	3.6	0.7	1.2	7.5	49.4	50.5
Norstat	16–22 August 2017	28.4	19.3	17.5	8.3	4.4	5.1	5.4	4.8	4.1		1.7	9.1	47.0	52.0
Wilke	10–17 August 2017	25.0	16.1	17.5	8.3	7.3	6.3	6.0	4.9	5.1		3.5	7.5	49.5	50.5
Voxmeter	21 August 2017	26.3	19.2	19.2	8.7	6.4	4.5	5.7	5.6	3.0	0.7	0.5	7.1	48.7	50.8
Voxmeter	12 August 2017	25.6	17.6	18.9	10.0	7.6	4.4	5.1	4.7	3.8	0.8	1.5	6.7	50.2	49.8
Gallup	August 10, 2017	24.3	17.2	20.6	7.6	6.7	5.4	5.3	4.7	5.1	0.8	2.0	5.1	52.4	47.3
Voxmeter	August 6, 2017	26.9	18.9	17.8	9.1	6.4	5.7	5.2	4.1	4.2	0.3	1.2	8.0	48.8	51.0
Greens	2 August 2017	26.3	15,9	18.8	8.0	6.1	5.3	5.9	4.8	5.2	0.6	2.9	7.5	49.5	50.3
Gallup	6 July 2017	25.6	17.4	20.3	7.4	5.5	6.0	5.6	4.5	4.5	0.6	2.2	5.3	50.5	49.1
Voxmeter	July 2, 2017	25.3	20.9	17.2	8.5	6.1	5.7	6.3	5.2	3.5	0.6	0.7	5.1	49.0	51.0
Voxmeter	30 April 2017	28.0	18.0	18.4	8.4	5.4	5.8	5.9	4.4	4.0	0.7	0.7	6.6	47.2	52.5
Norstat	25 April 2017	28.6	17.4	17.1	8.4	5.9	5.7	6.0	4.2	3.5	0.0	2.5	11.2	46.4	52.9
Epinion	25 April 2017	27.3	18.0	19.1	7.8	5.7	5.2	5.6	5.0	4.3	0.0	1.9	8.2	49.0	50.9
Voxmeter	23 April 2017	27.4	17.3	18.4	8.6	5.8	5.3	6.3	4.7	4.1	0.7	0.9	9.0	47.2	52.3
Voxmeter	17 April 2017	27.9	18.0	19.5	8.2	5.2	6.0	5.8	4.2	3.9	0.5	0.6	8.4	47.7	52.1
YouGov	11 April 2017	26.8	14.3	17.5	9.6	6.9	5.1	4.6	4.7	5.4	1.0	3.9	9.3	49.0	50.8
Voxmeter	8 April 2017	26.4	17.8	19.8	8.1	5.0	5.0	6.3	4.5	4.7	0.9	1.1	9.6	49.3	50.3
Gallup	6 April 2017	25.2	18.6	18.7	9.1	6.5	5.4	4.6	5.3	4.6	0.7	1.2	6.5	50.3	49.6
Voxmeter	2 April 2017	27.0	18.4	18.6	8.1	5.5	5.9	5.6	4.8	4.3	0.7	0.5	8.4	48.0	51.4
Greens	29 March 2017	25.9	17.8	16.8	9.4	5.8	5.4	6.1	4.1	2.4	1.0	2.4	8.1	48.8	50.9
Megafon	29 March 2017	26.5	16.3	18.5	8.6	4.9	5.1	6.5	4.9	4.7	0.3	3.2	8.0	47.9	51.6
YouGov	27 March 2017	25.2	16.2	18.7	9.6	5.9	5.0	6.3	4.6	4.1	0.7	3.6	6.5	49.2	50.7
Voxmeter	26 March 2017	28.4	17.0	18.0	9.1	6.8	6.1	4.3	4.5	4.0	0.5	1.1	10.4	47.4	52.4
Epinion	21 March 2017	27.7	18.3	18.6	8.2	6.4	4.5	5.6	4.6	4.1		1.9	9.1	49.3	50.6
Norstat	20 March 2017	25.9	18.0	15.1	7.8	7.1	6.1	5.8	6.0	5.1		2.2	7.9	47.5	51.6
Voxmeter	19 March 2017	27.5	18.7	17.8	8.0	5.4	6.6	4.7	5.0	4.7	0.7	0.9	8.8	48.2	51.8
YouGov	13 March 2017	26.2	15.2	18.1	8.6	6.3	4.5	5.7	5.6	4.5	0.6	4.5	8.1	49.2	50.6
Voxmeter	11 March 2017	27.4	18.7	16.6	7.9	6.1	6.0	5.1	5.3	5.0	0.7	0.8	8.7	47.9	51.7
Gallup	9 March 2017	27.4	16.7	18.1	8.6	6.2	5.5	5.6	4.9	4.3	0.7	2.0	9.3	48.0	52.0
Wilke	8 March 2017	26.3	16.6	17.4	8.4	6.2	6.3	5.8	5.3	5.3		2.4	8.9	47.9	52.1
Voxmeter	5 March 2017	28.6	17.4	18.2	8.5	5.4	5.5	5.3	4.0	4.7	0.7	1.4	10.4	47.8	51.9
Greens	2 March 2017	26.3	17.4	18.8	8.6	5.5	5.3	5.8	4.8	4.2	0.5	2.3	7.5	48.7	50.8
YouGov	26 February 2017	25.2	16.1	16.6	8.6	7.4	6.1	5.8	5.3	4.6	0.7	3.5	8.6	48.9	51.0
Voxmeter	26 February 2017	28.7	15.7	17.2	8.6	6.9	5.5	6.4	4.9	3.6	1.0	1.5	11.5	45.9	54.1
Epinion	21 February 2017	29.0	17.6	18.0	8.3	6.1	4.8	5.4	5.1	3.6		2.0	11.0	47.3	52.6
Norstat	19 February 2017	28.1	16.3	18.0	8.3	6.3	4.8	5.8	5.1	4.9	1.0	1.5	10.1	48.0	52.1
Voxmeter	19 February 2017	27.3	16.8	18.2	9.4	5.7	5.8	5.2	5.1	4.1	0.7	1.5	9.1	47.0	52.8
Voxmeter	11 February 2017	27.0	17.4	18.7	7.9	6.4	5.7	5.2	5.9	3.8	0.7	1.2	8.3	48.2	51.7
Gallup	9 February 2017	26.4	15.8	20.2	8.7	6.8	5.5	5.2	4.7	4.4	0.6	1.7	6.2	49.5	50.5
Voxmeter	5 February 2017	27.9	17.1	18.9	8.8	5.8	5.6	5.4	4.6	3.9	0.7	1.2	9.0	47.6	52.3
Greens	1 February 2017	27.2	17.0	16.2	7.5	5.8	7.0	7.2	4.2	4.2	1.0	2.5	10.2	46.7	53.1
Voxmeter	29 January 2017	29.0	16.7	18.6	8.6	6.3	4.9	6.4	4.3	3.3	1.1	0.8	10.4	46.8	53.2
Epinion	22 January 2017	28.3	16.9	18.6	7.7	6.2	4.9	6.3	4.1	3.8		3.1	9.7	48.6	51.3
Voxmeter	22 January 2017	27.4	16.0	19.6	9.3	6.6	5.6	5.0	5.1	4.0	0.5	0.8	7.8	47.5	52.4
Wilke	19 January 2017	26.7	15.3	18.0	8.6	6.5	6.1	6.2	5.2	4.8		2.6	8.7	47.2	52.8
Voxmeter	14 January 2017	27.4	17.1	19.0	9.8	6.5	5.1	5.8	4.4	3.4	0.6	1.2	8.4	47.6	52.5
YouGov	9 January 2017	25.0	14.9	20.1	8.3	6.6	5.3	5.9	4.8	4.0	0.7	4.5	4.9	50.8	49.2
Voxmeter	8 January 2017	27.3	17.1	18.5	9.1	6.2	6.0	4.6	4.9	4.4	0.8	0.9	8.8	47.9	51.9
Gallup	5 January 2017	25.9	17.8	20.0	7.4	5.6	5.0	5.7	5.4	3.6	0.6	2.6	5.9	50.2	49.4

=== 2016 ===
Poll source	End date	A	O	V	Ø	I	Å	B	F	C	K	D	Lead	Blue	Red
Greens	21 December 2016	**26.7**	16.1	15.9	8.7	6.1	6.4	7	4.6	4.1	0.5	2.7	10.6	45.4	53.4
YouGov	19 December 2016	**26.5**	13.6	18.1	8.1	7.5	6.5	6.0	5.1	4.3	0.8	3.6	8.4	47.8	52.2
Epinion	18 December 2016	**26.8**	17.1	18.2	8.1	6.9	5.5	5.5	5.0	4.1		2.9	9.7	49.2	50.8
Voxmeter	18 December 2016	**27.7**	16.8	17.6	8.7	7.6	7.1	4.5	3.8	3.6	0.9	1.5	10.9	48.0	51.8
Voxmeter	10 December 2016	**28.1**	17.3	17.8	7.9	6.3	6.1	5.4	4.7	4.1	0.5	1.6	10.3	47.6	52.2
Gallup	8 December 2016	**28.8**	17.1	17.8	8.2	6.4	5.7	5.5	3.8	4.3	0.9	1.4	11.0	47.9	52.0
Voxmeter	4 December 2016	**28.9**	15.7	19.2	8.2	7.8	5.9	4.6	3.8	3.6	0.6	1.4	9.7	48.3	51.4
Megafon	1 December 2016	**24.5**	16.1	17.4	9.0	6.3	6.9	6.9	5.0	3.7	0.7	3.4	7.1	47.6	52.3
Voxmeter	27 November 2016	**28.3**	14.6	18.9	8.0	7.3	6.9	5.3	4.7	3.8	0.9	1.4	9.4	46.9	53.2
Epinion	22 November 2016	**28.0**	16.6	18.4	7.9	7.2	6.4	5.1	4.4	2.8		3.2	9.6	48.2	51.8
Voxmeter	20 November 2016	**28.1**	15.9	19.5	7.5	7.8	6.5	4.4	4.2	3.0	0.7	2.3	8.6	49.2	50.7
YouGov	14 November 2016	**27.7**	15.5	16.4	6.9	8.7	5.1	4.8	5.2	3.3	0.7	5.6	11.3	50.2	49.7
Norstat	13 November 2016	**29.1**	14.3	20.2	8.8	5.9	5.4	5.2	4.4	2.8	0.9	2.1	8.9	46.2	52.9
Voxmeter	12 November 2016	**27.7**	17.2	19.8	8.2	6.0	6.5	5.7	4.3	2.9	0.7	1.0	7.9	47.6	52.4
Gallup	10 November 2016	**26.9**	16.5	18.8	8.5	7.1	6.1	5.3	4.8	3.1	0.7	2.2	8.1	48.4	51.6
Voxmeter	6 November 2016	**26.3**	16.2	20.3	8.9	7.3	6.4	4.9	4.6	2.7	0.7	1.3	6.0	48.5	51.1
Greens	2 November 2016	**26.1**	15.0	16.8	8.4	7.2	7.6	5.5	5.3	3.7	1.0	3.2	9.3	46.9	52.9
Yougov	31 October 2016	**27.7**	14.5	19.3	8.1	7.8	5.4	6.0	3.5	3.5	0.4	3.8	8.4	49.3	50.7
Voxmeter	30 October 2016	**27.1**	15.8	19.2	8.8	7.4	6.6	4.5	4.9	2.6	0.9	1.8	7.9	47.7	51.9
Megafon	26 October 2016	**25.2**	15.9	17.8	8.7	7.3	7.2	5.1	4.6	3.7	0.7	3.8	7.4	49.2	50.8
Voxmeter	23 October 2016	**27.8**	17.4	19.7	8.3	6.2	5.6	5.2	3.8	3.2	0.8	1.8	8.1	49.1	50.7
Epinion	20 October 2016	**28.2**	18.5	17.2	9.3	5.7	5.2	5.2	5.4	2.6		2.7	9.7	46.7	53.3
YouGov	17 October 2016	**28.7**	16.2	16.8	8.9	7.2	5.3	4.9	4.3	3.3	0.8	3.6	11.9	47.9	52.1
Wilke	17 October 2016	**26.2**	16.2	18.1	7.6	7.5	6.5	6.0	4.6	3.5	0.7	3.1	8.1	49.1	50.9
Voxmeter	16 October 2016	**28.6**	18.7	17.5	9.2	6.7	5.8	5.3	3.8	2.7	0.5	1.0	9.9	47.1	52.7
Norstat	9 October 2016	**27.0**	19.4	16.8	8.1	6.7	6.7	4.5	4.2	3.2	1.0	2.1	7.6	49.2	50.5
Voxmeter	8 October 2016	**27.5**	18.6	17.3	8.7	7.0	5.5	5.8	4.4	2.9	0.9	1.6	8.9	48.3	51.3
Gallup	6 October 2016	**24.9**	18.7	18.7	8.3	6.1	6.4	5.5	4.6	3.9	1.0	1.8	6.2	50.2	49.7
Yougov	3 October 2016	**26.4**	17.0	18.1	9.3	7.0	5.3	4.6	4.4	3.8	1.0	3.0	8.3	49.9	50.0
Voxmeter	2 October 2016	**27.7**	17.8	17.2	8.2	7.8	6.0	5.9	4.4	2.5	0.2	2.3	9.9	47.8	52.2
Greens	28 September 2016	**27.6**	18.8	16.7	8.2	6.3	5.6	4.1	5.2	3.4	0.6	3.4	8.8	49.2	50.7
Voxmeter	25 September 2016	**26.5**	19.1	19.5	8.1	8.0	6.3	4.6	3.6	2.9	0.2		7.0	49.7	49.1
YouGov	23 September 2016	**25.1**	17.5	17.2	8.1	6.6	7.5	5.2	4.2	3.3	1.0	4.3	7.6	49.9	50.1
Megafon	23 September 2016	**25.4**	17.7	16.4	7.4	6.8	6.9	5.5	4.8	3.0	0.9	4.9	6.7	49.7	50.0
Epinion	21 September 2016	**26.7**	21.6	19.5	7.5	6.3	6.0	5.1	4.5	2.8		Ineligible to run	5.1	50.2	49.8
Voxmeter	18 September 2016	**27.3**	19.3	18.1	9.3	7.2	6.0	4.4	4.6	2.8	0.7	Ineligible to run	8.0	48.1	51.6
Norstat	11 September 2016	**27.3**	22.4	17.4	8.6	5.8	5.0	5.2	4.8	2.1	0.6	Ineligible to run	4.9	48.3	50.9
Voxmeter	10 September 2016	**27.3**	19.0	18.2	8.9	8.0	5.6	5.1	3.8	3.1	0.6	Ineligible to run	8.3	48.9	50.7
Gallup	8 September 2016	**24.8**	18.8	19.4	8.5	7.7	5.1	5.3	4.6	3.5	0.8	Ineligible to run	5.4	50.2	48.3
Greens	7 September 2016	**26.4**	18.3	16.5	9.5	8.2	5.6	5.4	5.5	2.9	1.0	Ineligible to run	8.1	46.9	52.4
Voxmeter	4 September 2016	**26.9**	19.0	16.9	8.1	8.5	6.1	5.8	4.3	3.2	0.6	Ineligible to run	7.9	48.2	51.2
Voxmeter	28 August 2016	**26.0**	19.3	17.5	8.3	9.1	6.3	5.3	3.8	3.2	0.6	Ineligible to run	6.7	49.7	49.7
Epinion	24 August 2016	**26.3**	21.9	17.3	8.2	7.1	6.8	4.9	4.8	2.6		Ineligible to run	4.4	48.9	51.0
Megafon	22 August 2016	**25.3**	18.6	18.2	7.4	8.4	7.6	5.4	4.9	2.7	1.2	Ineligible to run	6.7	49.1	50.6
Wilke	22 August 2016	**24.0**	20.7	17.4	8.0	9.5	6.9	5.1	4.2	3.4	0.8	Ineligible to run	3.3	51.8	48.2
Voxmeter	21 August 2016	**26.8**	20.3	16.4	8.2	7.7	6.4	5.3	3.9	3.8	0.6	Ineligible to run	6.5	48.8	50.6
Norstat	15 August 2016	**24.6**	21.1	18.8	7.1	6.9	6.8	5.1	4.2	4.3	0.4	Ineligible to run	3.5	51.5	47.8
Voxmeter	13 August 2016	**25.6**	21.2	16.1	8.3	7.4	7.8	4.7	4.8	3.0	0.7	Ineligible to run	4.4	48.4	51.2
Gallup	11 August 2016	**24.8**	19.9	18.7	7.9	7.4	6.3	6.2	3.6	3.5	0.7	Ineligible to run	4.9	50.2	48.8
Voxmeter	7 August 2016	**26.1**	21.4	16.4	7.5	7.0	7.5	4.2	4.5	3.6	1.1	Ineligible to run	4.7	49.5	49.8
Greens	3 August 2016	**26.5**	19.1	18.4	7.4	7.6	6.0	5.3	4.2	3.7	1.1	Ineligible to run	7.4	49.9	49.4
Gallup	7 July 2016	**24.3**	20.2	18.0	8.5	6.9	6.0	6.0	5.1	3.7	0.5	Ineligible to run	4.1	49.3	49.9
Voxmeter	3 July 2016	**25.3**	20.3	18.1	8.4	7.3	7.0	4.6	4.4	3.4	0.7	Ineligible to run	5.0	49.8	49.7
Megafon	30 June 2016	**22.6**	19.0	17.6	8.1	7.4	8.3	5.8	5.5	4.2	0.6	Ineligible to run	3.6	48.8	50.3
Voxmeter	26 June 2016	**24.5**	20.1	17.1	8.9	7.8	7.3	4.7	4.8	3.5	0.6	Ineligible to run	4.4	49.1	50.2
Voxmeter	18 June 2016	**25.9**	20.7	17.5	7.8	8.7	6.9	4.9	4.1	2.6	0.7	Ineligible to run	5.2	50.2	49.6
Norstat	13 June 2016	**25.7**	19.5	18.3	8.7	5.4	6.9	5.5	4.9	3.1		Ineligible to run	6.2	46.3	51.7
Voxmeter	12 June 2016	**25.4**	20.9	18.1	8.3	7.9	7.4	4.3	4.0	2.9	0.7	Ineligible to run	4.5	50.5	49.4
Gallup	9 June 2016	**25.1**	19.8	18.9	8.2	7.3	6.9	4.6	4.6	3.5	0.7	Ineligible to run	5.3	50.2	49.4
Wilke	5 June 2016	**24.1**	20.0	16.5	8.9	9.0	7.5	4.9	4.6	3.7	0.8	Ineligible to run	4.1	50.0	50.0
Voxmeter	5 June 2016	**25.8**	19.6	17.3	8.0	7.4	8.4	4.9	4.6	2.9	0.8	Ineligible to run	6.4	48.0	51.7
Greens	2 June 2016	**25.7**	19.7	16.6	9.0	6.5	7.8	5.4	5.1	3.2	0.7	Ineligible to run	6.0	46.7	53.0
Voxmeter	29 May 2016	**25.4**	19.7	17.9	8.5	7.7	7.1	5.0	4.5	3.1	0.6	Ineligible to run	5.7	49.0	50.5
Epinion	24 May 2016	**26.8**	21.1	17.0	8.2	8.2	6.0	5.0	4.7	2.9		Ineligible to run	5.7	49.2	50.7
Voxmeter	21 May 2016	**25.3**	18.7	18.4	9.1	7.6	8.1	5.0	4.3	2.4	0.9	Ineligible to run	6.4	48.0	51.8
Norstat	16 May 2016	**26.3**	19.3	17.2	8.8	7.3	7.1	3.3	4.6	4.2		Ineligible to run	7.0	48.0	50.1
Voxmeter	15 May 2016	**25.1**	19.1	18.6	9.9	8.1	7.0	4.5	3.8	2.8	0.8	Ineligible to run	6.0	49.4	50.3
YouGov	11 May 2016	**23.6**	17.4	18.7	9.8	8.8	8.1	4.8	4.1	3.6	1.1	Ineligible to run	4.9	49.7	50.3
Voxmeter	8 May 2016	**25.5**	19.9	18.9	8.6	8.1	7.5	3.8	3.9	3.1	0.5	Ineligible to run	5.6	50.5	49.3
Gallup	7 May 2016	**25.4**	18.9	19.0	7.4	7.6	7.6	5.0	3.8	3.9	0.8	Ineligible to run	6.4	50.2	49.2
Megafon	28 April 2016	**24.5**	21.0	18.4	8.2	7.5	7.5	5.5	3.4	3.2	0.5	Ineligible to run	3.5	50.6	49.1
Gallup	7 April 2016	**25.8**	19.5	18.4	8.3	7.7	6.6	4.9	4.7	3.3	0.5	Ineligible to run	6.3	49.4	50.3
Voxmeter	3 April 2016	**24.8**	20.6	17.9	8.4	7.3	7.8	5.3	4.0	3.0	0.7	Ineligible to run	4.2	49.5	50.3
Megafon	31 March 2016	**23.1**	19.8	17.5	8.8	7.1	7.7	6.6	4.8	3.3	0.9	Ineligible to run	3.3	48.6	51.0
Greens	30 March 2016	**23.9**	21.2	17.4	9.6	6.3	7.8	5.5	4.1	3.4	0.3	Ineligible to run	2.7	48.6	50.9
YouGov	28 March 2016	**24.8**	20.5	18.3	7.7	8.4	8	4.2	3.7	3.4	1.0	Ineligible to run	4.3	51.6	48.4
Voxmeter	27 March 2016	**25.5**	20.7	17.2	7.8	7.8	7.4	4.8	4.5	3.4	0.7	Ineligible to run	4.8	49.8	50.0
Voxmeter	20 March 2016	**26.0**	20.0	17.6	8.2	7.5	6.4	4.8	5.4	3.2	0.7	Ineligible to run	5.0	49.0	50.8
Epinion	17 March 2016	**26.4**	21.5	17.6	8.2	7.6	5.9	5.6	4.2	2.8		Ineligible to run	4.9	49.7	50.3
Norstat	14 March 2016	**25.1**	21.3	18.2	9.2	7.1	6.4	5.3	3.7	2.4		Ineligible to run	3.8	49.0	49.7
Voxmeter	12 March 2016	**25.3**	19.8	18.4	8.9	7.3	6.9	4.9	4.5	3.0	0.7	Ineligible to run	5.5	49.2	50.5
Gallup	10 March 2016	**25.2**	20.9	18.8	9.8	7.4	5.8	4.9	3.4	3.1	0.5	Ineligible to run	4.3	50.7	49.1
Voxmeter	6 March 2016	**25.0**	20.1	17.7	9.9	8.0	6.2	5.1	3.9	3.3	0.7	Ineligible to run	4.9	49.8	50.1
Greens	1 March 2016	**23.6**	18.8	18.1	9.1	7.3	6.6	6.1	4.8	4.3	0.7	Ineligible to run	4.8	49.2	50.2
Voxmeter	28 February 2016	**24.5**	20.3	17.2	9.2	8.7	5.9	5.7	4.1	3.3	0.8	Ineligible to run	4.2	50.3	49.4
Gallup	26 February 2016	**23.8**	19.3	17.1	8.6	6.9	6.7	7.2	4.4	5.1	0.9	Ineligible to run	4.5	49.3	50.7
Megafon	25 February 2016	**23.4**	20.5	16.2	8.8	8.1	6.5	7	4.4	4.3	0.4	Ineligible to run	2.9	49.5	50.1
Epinion	23 February 2016	**24.3**	21.3	17.1	8.2	7.9	5.8	6.9	4.9	3.6		Ineligible to run	3.0	49.9	50.1
Norstat	21 February 2016	**24.3**	21.9	17	9.3	6.9	6.1	4.6	6.0	2.7	0.8	Ineligible to run	2.4	49.3	50.3
Voxmeter	21 February 2016	**25.0**	19.8	16.8	8.7	8.9	6.3	6.2	4.6	2.9	0.8	Ineligible to run	5.2	49.2	50.8
Wilke	21 February 2016	**21.9**	21.0	17.1	9.1	9.0	7.8	6.6	3.9	3.1	0.5	Ineligible to run	0.9	50.7	49.3
Voxmeter	13 February 2016	**23.8**	20.7	16.7	9	8.1	6.8	6.1	4.7	3.2	0.7	Ineligible to run	3.1	49.4	50.4
Gallup	11 February 2016	**22.6**	20.0	17.7	8.5	9.4	7.7	6.1	4.0	3.1	0.7	Ineligible to run	2.6	50.9	48.9
Voxmeter	7 February 2016	**25.5**	21.4	16.4	8.3	8	6.6	5.6	4.5	2.7	0.7	Ineligible to run	4.1	49.2	50.5
Voxmeter	31 January 2016	**24.1**	20.9	17.5	9	7.1	6.4	6	5.2	3	0.7	Ineligible to run	3.2	49.2	50.7
Megafon	28 January 2016	19.3	**20.2**	17.2	9.2	7.3	9.3	8.5	4.8	3	0.8	Ineligible to run	0.9	48.5	51.1
Greens	27 January 2016	**24.5**	19.7	19.1	8.0	7.3	6.4	6.0	5.0	2.8	0.5	Ineligible to run	4.8	49.4	49.9
YouGov	24 January 2016	**23.9**	20.1	17.2	8.7	8.8	6.8	5.4	4.2	3.8	1.2	Ineligible to run	3.8	51.1	49.0
Voxmeter	24 January 2016	**25.0**	21.0	18.0	8.2	7.4	6.4	5.9	3.9	3.1	0.7	Ineligible to run	4.0	50.2	49.4
Epinion	19 January 2016	**25.4**	19.6	19.1	8.8	7.3	5.8	5.7	4.5	3.9		Ineligible to run	5.8	49.9	50.2
Norstat	17 January 2016	**25.6**	19.5	19.7	8.9	7.3	5.7	5.1	4.2	3.2	0.6	Ineligible to run	4.0	50.3	49.5
Voxmeter	16 January 2016	**24.3**	19.6	19.0	9.2	7.5	6.5	5.8	4.2	2.8	0.8	Ineligible to run	4.7	49.7	50.0
YouGov	10 January 2016	**23.2**	20.3	18.8	8.7	7.9	6.1	5.5	4.8	4.1	0.6	Ineligible to run	2.9	51.7	48.3
Voxmeter	10 January 2016	**25.3**	18.9	18.8	9.3	8.2	6.0	5.5	4.4	2.8	0.7	Ineligible to run	6.4	49.4	50.5
Gallup	10 January 2016	**24.6**	19.3	18.5	9.7	7.9	6.4	5.5	3.6	3.6	0.7	Ineligible to run	5.3	50.0	49.8

=== 2015 ===
Polling Firm/Link	Last date of polling	A	O	V	Ø	I	Å	B	F	C	K	Lead	Blue	Red
Greens	28 December 2015	**25.3**	19.2	16.6	8.3	7.1	6.1	8.1	4.7	3.2	0.7	6.1	46.8	52.5
YouGov	21 December 2015	**23.8**	21.0	17.7	9.3	8.3	6.1	5.1	4.2	3.5	0.9	2.8	51.4	48.5
General Election	18 June 2015	**26.3**	21.1	19.5	7.8	7.5	4.8	4.6	4.2	3.4	0.8	5.2	52.3	47.6

=== Faroe Islands ===
Poll source	Fieldwork period	Sample size	E	C	B	A	F	H	D	Other	Lead	Blue	Red
General Election	5 June 2019	26,206	18.6	25.5	**28.3**	23.8	2.5	(Note: Ineligible to run)	1.3	(Note: Ineligible to run)	2.8	52.1	47.8
Gallup	18-31 May 2019	537	22.2	23.4	**27.6**	19.1	4.1	(Note: Ineligible to run)	3.1	0.5	4.2	46.7	52.6
Gallup	18-21 June 2018	543	21.6	24.3	**28.8**	18.6	3.8	(Note: Ineligible to run)	2.6	0.3	5.0	47.4	52.3
Regional Election	1 September 2015	32,257	20.7	25.1	18.7	18.9	6.9	5.5	4.0	0.0	3.4	43.2	56.8
General Election	18 June 2015	23,366	**24.5**	24.3	23.5	18.7	3.2	2.6	1.6	1.5	0.2	44.8	53.7

=== Greenland ===
Poll source	Fieldwork period	Sample size	IA	S	D	A	PN	SA	NQ	Other	Lead	Blue	Red
General Election	5 June 2019	20,615	**33.4**	29.4	11.0	5.3	7.6	2.5	7.8	0.0	4.0	7.8	73.8
Regional Election	24 April 2018	29,005	25.5	**27.2**	19.5	5.9	13.4	4.1	3.6	0.0	0.2	10.1	72.9
General Election	18 June 2015	19,976	**38.5**	38.2	8.5	7.4	4.7	(Note: Ineligible to run)		0.0	0.2	7.4	87.9

== See also ==
- Opinion polling for the 2022 Danish general election
- Opinion polling for the 2015 Danish general election
