= Gallup International Association =

Association of polling organizations

The Gallup International Association (GIA) is an association of polling organizations based in Zurich, Switzerland. The Gallup International Association was founded in 1947 in Loxwood Hall, Sussex, UK. George H. Gallup served as its first President, until his death in 1984. In January 2018, the management headquarters was relocated to Vienna, Austria.

Gallup, Inc. US and the Gallup International Association (GIA) were involved in a legal dispute over the use of the Gallup name. Gallup International Association or its members are not related to Gallup Inc., headquartered in Washington DC, which is no longer a member of Gallup International Association.

The Board includes Kancho Stoychev (President), Michael Nitsche (Executive Vice President), Johnny Heald (Vice President), Andrey Milekhin (Vice President) and Munqith Dagher (Regional Director, MENA). Gallup International has collaborated with UNICEF, BBC World Service, and Transparency International for a couple of its surveys. Its data has also been referenced by outlets such as The Guardian, The Economist, BBC News, CNN, and Reuters.
