= Russian Psychological Society =

The Russian Psychological Society (RPS; Russian: Российское Психологическое Общество) is the official professional association of Russian psychologists. RPS is a member of the European Federation of Psychologists' Associations and the International Union of Psychological Science.

== Work, aims and scopes ==
The Society was established to support career development of Russian psychologists and to promote psychological science in Russian Federation. Among its key aims are promoting psychology for the public good, making it accessible to all, providing support to its members, and hosting conferences and events.

In reaching its aims the Society is actively engaged in publishing, supports research in the field of psychology and works to ensure high standards of psychological education, training and practice in the Russian Federation.

== History ==
Founded on 24 January 1885 at Moscow Imperial University (now Lomonosov Moscow State University) as the Moscow Physics-Medical Society (Russian: Московское физико-медицинское общество) and later as Moscow Psychological Society, the organization pursued the goals of promoting psychological research and disseminating the psychological knowledge in Russian Empire. Its first honorable members were Wilhelm Wundt, Theodule Ribot, Hermann Ludwig Ferdinand von Helmholtz, William James, Edward Bradford Titchener.

The Russian Revolution of 1917, two World Wars and political reforms of the newly established Soviet State brought the official activity of the Russian Psychological Society to a hold. It was fully resumed in 1957 under the name of The Union of Psychologists of USSR.

Its current name of the Russian Psychological Society was taken in 1994 following the independence of the Russian Federation.

== Presidents ==
- 1885–1887 Troitskiy, Matvey Mikhailovich
- 1888–1899 Grot, Nikolay Yakovlevich
- 1899–1920 Lopatin, Lev Mikhailovich
- 1957–1963 Smirnov, Anatoliy Aleksandrovich
- 1963–1968 Leontiev, Aleksey Nikolaevich
- 1968–1983 Lomov, Boris Fiodorovich
- 1994–2001 Klimov, Eugeniy Aleksandrovich
- 2001–2007 Dontsov, Aleksander Ivanovich

Since 2007 and to the present time the President of the Russian Psychological Society is a professor, corresponding member of the Russian Academy of Education, doctor in Psychology, Yury P. Zinchenko

== Journals ==
=== Psychology in Russia: State of the Art ===
Psychology in Russia: State of the Art is an annual academic journal covering all areas of psychology. Established in 2008, Russian Psychological Society's annual series Psychology in Russia: State of the Art presents a collection of original articles on Russian theoretical and empirical research to date. It traditionally covers various domains of psychological science, like cognitive, clinical, developmental, social psychology, neuropsychology, psychophysiology, psychology of labor and ergonomics, and methodology of psychological science.
It is indexed in:

- Russian Index of Scientific Citing
- Directory of Open Access Journals
- Academic Search Premier EBSCOPublishing
- PsycINFO
- Scopus.

=== National Psychological Journal ===
The National Psychological Journal covers current issues from the perspective of the psychological science, publishes scientific and journalistic work in the field of psychology, reviews of scientific articles and books on psychology, the materials on international scientific conferences, congresses, classical domestic and foreign psychology.
The authors are scientists, teachers of the Lomonosov Moscow State University, University of St. Petersburg and other universities in Russia and abroad, members from various ministries, departments, research laboratories and psychological services.

Thematic focus of the journal:

- Socio-psychological aspects of social life and economic priorities of Russia;
- Professional standards of training of professional psychologists;
- Psychological aspects of national security;
- Psychological issues of the priority national projects (health of the nation, the family and the school, the prevention of child abandonment and neglect, education, innovation and innovation in science, culture, etc.);
- Monitoring of Psychological Science in Russia and abroad;
- Basic and Applied Psychology, scientific instruments.

== Honorary Members ==
Honorary members of RPS:

- Lunt Ingrid Cecilia Great Britain. Psychologist
- Stanislav Grof Czech Republic, United States. Psychologist, psychiatrist, psychoanalyst
- Juri L. Hanin Russia, Finland. Psychologist
- Viktor A. Sadovnichiy Russia. Mathematician
- Sergey K. Shoigu Russia. Minister of Defence
- Alexander Bain Scotland. Philosopher, mathematician, psychologist, teacher
- Wilhelm Windelband Germany. Philosopher, teacher
- Wilhelm Wundt Germany. Physician, physiologist, psychologist, teacher
- Karl Robert Eduard von Hartmann Germany. Philosopher, psychologist
- Hermann von Helmholtz Germany. Physicist, physician, physiologist, psychologist, teacher
- Harald Høffding Denmark, philosopher, historian, psychologist, teacher
- William James USA. Doctor, psychologist, philosopher, psychologist
- Emil du Bois-Reymond Germany. Psychologist, philosopher
- Théodule Ribot France. Philosopher, psychologist, teacher
- Charles Richet France. Physiologist, psychologist, teacher
- Herbert Spencer Great Britain. Philosopher, sociologist, psychologist
- Edward B. Titchener United Kingdom, United States of America (USA). Psychologist, teacher
- Eduard Zeller Germany. Philosopher, theologian, historian
