= Alan Carr (psychologist) =

Irish clinical psychologist

- Born: 1957
- Education: Queen's University at Kingston (PhD)
- Awards: Award of Special Merit, Psychological Society of Ireland (2001); EFTA Award, European Family Therapy Association (2010)
- Scientific career
- Fields: Clinical psychology, family therapy, positive psychology
- Workplaces: University College Dublin

Alan Carr (born 1957) is an Irish clinical psychologist and family therapist. He is a professor of clinical psychology at University College Dublin (UCD).

Carr has written or edited textbooks on family therapy, child and adolescent clinical psychology, intellectual disability and positive psychology, and he has reviewed the research evidence for psychological treatments. His books include The Handbook of Child and Adolescent Clinical Psychology (1999), Family Therapy: Concepts, Process and Practice (2000), Positive Psychology (2004) and What Works with Children, Adolescents, and Adults? (2009). For the Commission to Inquire into Child Abuse, he led a study of adults who had lived in Irish residential institutions as children.

Carr received the Psychological Society of Ireland's Award of Special Merit in 2001.

== Life and career ==
Carr was born in 1957. He held a research fellowship from the Economic and Social Research Institute from 1980 to 1984 to study for a PhD in clinical psychology at Queen's University in Kingston, Ontario. He later worked at the British National Health Service.

Carr was the founding director of UCD's doctoral programme in clinical psychology. He headed the university's School of Psychology three times between 1999 and 2019. He also worked as a family therapist at the Clanwilliam Institute in Dublin. He is a full professor of clinical psychology in the UCD School of Psychology.

== Work ==
Carr's book Positive Practice: A Step-by-Step Guide to Family Therapy, which describes the stages of brief family therapy and systemic consultation for mental health workers, was published in 1995. His textbook Family Therapy: Concepts, Process and Practice (2000) proposed a formulation model that draws on several schools of family therapy. In her review for the Journal of Child Psychology and Psychiatry, Judith Lask found the model useful to therapists, and in Contemporary Family Therapy, Ingeborg E. Haug praised the book's clarity. However, she pointed out that it said little about professional ethics or about diversity among clients.

Carr's The Handbook of Child and Adolescent Clinical Psychology: A Contextual Approach was published in 1999. In his review for The British Journal of Psychiatry, Terry Birchmore compared it with Michael Rutter and Lionel Hersov's multi-author Child and Adolescent Psychiatry: Modern Approaches, and wrote that as a single-author book, Carr's was more systematically organised, presenting differing theoretical approaches within each chapter. Kathryn Lewis called the 2006 second edition "an extraordinarily solid and well organized guide to clinical practice". However, she criticised the fact that it did not link the difficulties of abused and neglected children to the effects of chronic trauma on brain development. Carr also co-edited The Handbook of Intellectual Disability and Clinical Psychology Practice (2007), which covers assessment and intervention with people with intellectual disabilities from infancy to adulthood. His Clinical Psychology: An Introduction (2012) describes how clinical psychologists are trained and how they assess and treat disorders. Geoffrey L. Thorpe found the chapters on disorders detailed and carefully researched but limited in range. Thorpe also thought its focus on training in Ireland and the United Kingdom made it less useful to North American students, while Claudie Fox, in her review for Child and Adolescent Mental Health, welcomed its move away from the American slant of most undergraduate textbooks.

Carr has also evaluated programmes and reviewed the evidence for psychological treatments. He was co-author, with Deirdre MacIntyre, of two 1999 evaluations of Stay Safe, a school-based child sexual abuse prevention programme in Ireland. The studies found that children who took part kept their gains in safety knowledge and skills, and that they were more likely than other children to disclose abuse. What Works with Children and Adolescents? (2000), which he wrote with nine other psychologists, covered twenty years of research on treatments for young people. In his review for The British Journal of Psychiatry, Richard Harrington called it a useful and comprehensive introduction; however, he thought the authors had missed some relevant studies and some methodological problems. With Maeve Martin, Carr then carried out the Clonmel Project, a survey of young people in Clonmel, County Tipperary. Its results, released in 2006, showed that one in five had had a psychological disorder in the previous year. In 2007 he and Mark Quinn evaluated the effectiveness of the Parents Plus parent-training programme with parents of pre-school children with developmental disabilities. His What Works with Children, Adolescents, and Adults? (2009) reviewed research on the effectiveness of psychological interventions with children, adults and older adults. In her review for Clinical Child Psychology and Psychiatry, Jenny Hunt thought it a useful guide for clinical practice and welcomed Carr's translation of effect sizes into percentage success rates. In his review of the book, Sami Timimi wrote that by dividing the evidence by diagnosis, Carr gave a misleading impression that specific techniques work best for specific disorders.

Carr's book Positive Psychology: The Science of Happiness and Human Strengths was published in 2004. Kennon M. Sheldon reviewed the book in The Journal of Positive Psychology and found its descriptions of theories accurate. However, he added that the book introduced concepts in isolation and that it left out many of the connections between them. Uma Chandrika Millner called the 2011 edition comprehensive. She wrote that Carr brought relational and contextual factors into concepts that are mainly individualistic. Carr and colleagues also developed Say Yes to Life, a 20-session programme for adults with major depressive disorder. He conducted a meta-analysis in 2021 that covered 347 studies of positive psychology interventions and found small to moderate benefits for wellbeing and mental health that were still present three months later.

Carr led a study for the Commission to Inquire into Child Abuse, which investigated abuse in Irish residential institutions. In 2005 and 2006 his team interviewed former residents of the institutions who had given evidence to the commission. His report, published in 2009, found that psychological disorders were twice as common among them as in the general population.

== Awards ==
- 2001 - Award of Special Merit, Psychological Society of Ireland
- 2010 - EFTA Award for contribution to family therapy research, European Family Therapy Association

== Selected books ==
- Carr, Alan (1999). The Handbook of Child and Adolescent Clinical Psychology: A Contextual Approach. London: Routledge. ISBN 0-415-19492-X. 4th ed. 2025.
- Carr, Alan (2000). Family Therapy: Concepts, Process and Practice. Chichester: John Wiley & Sons. ISBN 0-471-49124-1. 3rd ed. 2012; 4th ed. 2026.
- Carr, Alan (2004). Positive Psychology: The Science of Happiness and Human Strengths. Brunner-Routledge. ISBN 1-58391-991-0. 3rd ed. published as Positive Psychology: The Science of Wellbeing and Human Strengths, 2022.
- Carr, Alan; McNulty, Muireann, eds. (2006). The Handbook of Adult Clinical Psychology: An Evidence Based Practice Approach. Routledge. ISBN 1-58391-853-1. 2nd ed. 2016.
- Carr, Alan; O'Reilly, Gary; Walsh, Patricia Noonan; McEvoy, John, eds. (2007). The Handbook of Intellectual Disability and Clinical Psychology Practice. London: Routledge. ISBN 978-1-58391-861-6. 2nd ed. 2016.
- Carr, Alan (2009). What Works with Children, Adolescents, and Adults? A Review of Research on the Effectiveness of Psychotherapy. Hove: Routledge. ISBN 978-0-415-45291-5.
- Carr, Alan (2012). Clinical Psychology: An Introduction. Hove: Routledge. ISBN 978-0-415-68397-5.
