= Jim Doherty (musician) =

Irish composer and jazz pianist

- Born: James O'Doherty; 1939 (age 86–87); Dublin, Ireland
- Genres: Jazz
- Occupations: Musician, composer
- Instrument: Piano
- Years active: Late 1950s–present
- Label: Beechpark
- Formerly of: Louis Stewart

Jim Doherty (born 1939) is an Irish composer and jazz pianist. He is a member of Aosdána, an elite association of Irish artists.

== Early life ==
Jim Doherty was born in 1939; he was a son of Michael Kevin O'Doherty and Patricia (née Roche); and grandson of the Irish republican couple Katherine O'Doherty (1881–1969) and Séamus O'Doherty (1882–1945). The family lived in Sandymount, Dublin.

== Career ==
Doherty has been performing since the late 1950s, leading jazz trios, quartets and bands. One of his earliest roles was with the Chris Lamb & The Universals showband. He went to London in 1960 to study composition and orchestration. In 1965, he competed in the Irish selection for the Eurovision Song Contest; his Jim Doherty Trio performed "Love Me Truly" but did not win. In 1968, his Jim Doherty Quartet won the Press Prize at the Montreux Jazz Festival for the jazz suite Gael Blowin, based on Irish traditional music.

He has written music for theatre, radio, TV, dance, film and orchestra. He has written one play, The Lugnaquilla Gorilla, performed at the Abbey Theatre in 1983, and also wrote the jazz ballet Spondance (1986). He worked with RTÉ, composing music for many programmes including Wanderly Wagon and The Late Late Show.

Doherty has performed with Gerry Mulligan and Ray Charles.

Doherty was a life-long associate of guitarist Louis Stewart (1944–2016); they released an acclaimed album, Tunes, in 2014.

Doherty was elected to Aosdána in 2020.

== Personal life ==
Doherty married Ann in the 1960s; they live in Ballsbridge, Dublin. They have three children: the comedian David O'Doherty, playwright and actor Mark Doherty and Claudia Doherty. David added the prefix "O'" to the surname Doherty to distinguish himself from his father and brother.
