= European Federation of Psychologists' Associations =

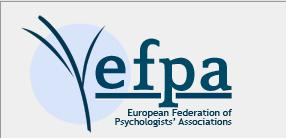
- Formation: 1981
- Headquarters: Grasmarkt 105/39, B-1000 Brussels, Belgium
- Members: 39
- Official language: English, French
- Website: www.efpa.eu

The European Federation of Psychologists' Associations (EFPA) is the umbrella organization of national societies in the field of psychology that are located in the European Economic Area.

== History ==
The federation was founded in 1981 and the first general assembly was held in Heidelberg. Since then, general assemblies have been held every two years in different European cities. Since 1995, the general assembly is held in conjunction with the biennial European Congress of Psychology.

== Aims ==
The federation is concerned with promoting and improving psychology as a profession and as a discipline, particularly, though not exclusively, in applied settings and with emphasis on the training and research associated with such practice. Its official journal is the European Psychologist. In 2009, the federation launched the EuroPsy register.

== Member associations ==
As of January 2023 the federation has 37 member associations, which together represent over 350,000 psychologists from all 27 members states of the European Union plus 3 members states of the EEA (Norway, Iceland, Liechtenstein) plus Albania, San Marino, Serbia, Switzerland, Turkey, Ukraine, United Kingdom. In addition, there are 14 organisations registered as associate member associations and 2 that are registered as affiliate member associations.

Country	Federation	Founded	Members
Albania	Urdhri Psikologut ne Republiken e Shqiperis		
Austria	Berufsverband Österreichischer Psychologen/innen		
Belgium	Fédération belge des psychologues - Belgische Federatie van Psychologen		
Bulgaria	Bulgarian Psychological Society		
Croatia	Croatian Psychological Association		
Cyprus	Cyprus Psychologists' Association		
Czech Republic	Unie Psychologickych Asociaci CR	1995	
Denmark	Dansk Psykologforening		
Estonia	Union of Estonian Psychologists		
Finland	Finnish Psychological Association		
France	Fédération française des psychologues et de psychologie	2003	
Germany	Föderation Deutscher Psychologenvereinigungen	1958	15000
Greece	Association of Greek Psychologists		
Hungary	Magyar Pszichológiai Társaság		
Iceland	The Icelandic Psychological Association	1954	500
Ireland	Psychological Society of Ireland	1970	3000
Italy	Italian Network of Professional Psychologists Associations INPPA c/o AUPI		
Latvia	Latvijas profesionalo psihologu asociacija		
Liechtenstein	Berufsverband der Psychologinnen und Psychologen Liechtensteins (BPL)		
Lithuania	Lithuanian Psychological Association		
Luxembourg	Société luxembourgeoise de psychologie		
Malta	Malta Union & Professional Body of Psychology (MUPP)		
Netherlands	Nederlands Instituut van Psychologen (NIP)	1938	13000
Norway	Norsk Psykologforening		
Poland	Polskie Towarzystwo Psychologiczne		
Portugal	Network OPP and SNP		
Romania	Colegiul Psihologilor din Romania		
San Marino	Ordine Degli Psicologi Della Repubblica Di San Marino		
Serbia	Association of Psychologists of Serbia		
Slovakia	Slovenska komora psychologov		
Slovenia	Slovenian Psychological Association (Drustvo psihologov Slovenije)		
Spain	Colegio Oficial de Psicologos		
Sweden	Sveriges Psykologförbund	1955	12000
Switzerland	Föderation der Schweizer Psycholog:innen	1987	7000
Turkey	Turkish Psychological Association P.K.		
Ukraine	National Association of psychologists of Ukraine		
United Kingdom	British Psychological Society	1901	60000

== EuroPsy ==
One of the major initiatives of the federation was the establishment of the EuroPsy or European Certificate in Psychology. This qualification sets a common standard for education, professional training and competence for psychologists to practice independently across Europe.

== Aristotle Prize ==
The Aristotle Prize, established in 1995, is awarded by EFPA to a psychologist from Europe who has made a distinguished contribution to psychology.

Recipients of the prize have been:

- 1995: Pieter Drenth
- 1997: Paul Baltes
- 1999: David Magnusson
- 2001: Alan Baddeley
- 2003: Lea Pulkkinen
- 2005: Rocio Fernandez-Ballesteros
- 2007: William Yule
- 2009: Claus Bundesen
- 2011: H. Marinus Van Ijzendoorn
- 2013: Niels Birbaumer
- 2015: José Maria Peiro
- 2017: CON AMORE – Center on Autobiographical Memory Research
- 2019: Naomi Ellemers

== See also ==
- European Federation of Psychology Students' Associations
