= E. F. O'Doherty =

Irish psychologist and priest

Eamonn Feichin O'Doherty (10 February 1918 – 9 September 1998), best known as E. F. O'Doherty, was an Irish experimental psychologist and Catholic priest.

== Career ==
O'Doherty was born to Seamus and Katherine O'Doherty in the United States of America. After the family returned to Ireland he attended the Irish Language School, Colaiste Mhuire, Dublin. He studied for the priesthood in Clonliffe College, Dublin and in Rome. Along with his religious formation studies, he also took a degree in UCD, as Clonliffe students did, he earned a BA in 1938 and an MA in 1939. While studying theology at the Lateran University in Rome he gained a BD in 1941. He obtained his Ph.D. in experimental psychology from University of Cambridge with Frederic Bartlett.

In 1949 he was appointed Professor of Logic and Psychology in University College Dublin succeeding his mentor Msgr. John Shine. He held the position until 1983 when he retired to be succeeded by Fr. Michael Nolan. Dr. O'Doherty served as Registrar for the college for a time. In 1958, he established the UCD Diploma in Psychology. The UCD School of Psychology awards the Eamon Fechín O'Doherty award for first place in the Higher Diploma in Psychology. In 1967 despite his misgivings for it as being taught as an undergraduate subject, O'Doherty established the BA in psychology in UCD. Professor O'Doherty along with his colleague Dr. Chamberlin established the first post-graduate course for Guidance Counsellors in Ireland in UCD also in 1967.

Monsignor O'Doherty died after a long illness aged 80 in 1998.

== Research and practice ==
As a Clinical psychologist, he was an assessor for Aer Lingus airline pilots.

He was a member of the United Nations Committee on Mental Health.

The Ferns Report into child abuse, highlighted how the Bishop ignored Professor O'Doherty's reports and evaluation of some of those who went on to be involved in the scandal.

== Family ==
O'Doherty's family were involved in the struggle for Irish independence. His father Séamus O'Doherty was an Irish Republican and a member of the IRB military council, and his parents accompanied Éamon de Valera on his visit to America, where young O'Doherty first attended school in Philadelphia. His mother Katherine acted as a courier during the War of Independence, and for De Valera and the Anti-Treaty side in the Civil War. She wrote Assignment America about the fundraising and campaign for recognition for the Republic, trip to the USA. Katherine was secretary for the National Aid Society following the Easter 1916 Rising. His maternal aunt Rev. Mother Columba (Maria) Gibbons, was also noted for her republican sympathies. His brother Kevin wrote a book about their parents My Parents and Other Rebels. Kevin's grandson is the comedian David O'Doherty. His sister Roisin, a goddaughter of De Valera, was a diplomat who married Robert McDonagh an Ambassador to West Germany, the United Kingdom and the United Nations.

== Publications ==
Books

- The Priest and Mental Health (1962) [with Desmond McGrath]
- Religion and Personality Problems (1964)
- General Psychology (1971)
- The Psychology of Vocation (1971)
- Vocation, Formation, Consecration & Vows: Theological and Psychological Considerations (1971)
- Religion and Psychology (1978)

Selected papers

- O'Doherty, E. F. (1948). Memory and Man. Irish Monthly 76 (895): 15–21.
- O'Doherty, E. F. (1951). Psychopathology and Mystical Phenomena. Studies: An Irish Quarterly Review 40 (157): 23–32.
- O'Doherty, E. F. (1956). Religion and Mental Health. Studies: An Irish Quarterly Review 45 (177): 39–49.
- O'Doherty, E. F. (1960). Taboo, Ritual and Religion. Studies: An Irish Quarterly Review 49 (194): 131–143.
- O'Doherty, E. (1960). Toward A Dynamic Psychology. Studies: An Irish Quarterly Review 49 (196): 341–354.
- O'Doherty, E. F. (1969). Psychological Aspects of Student Revolt. Theoria: A Journal of Social and Political Theory 33: 29–36.

== Awards ==
- Member, Royal Irish Academy
