= Martin McHugh =

Martin McHugh may refer to:

- Martin McHugh (Gaelic footballer) (born 1961), Gaelic footballer, manager and media pundit
- Martin McHugh (bowls) (born 1973), Northern Irish lawn bowler
- Martin McHugh (psychologist) (died 2016), Irish psychologist
