= Academia Europaea =

Pan-European academy of sciences headquartered in Munich

- Formation: 1988; 38 years ago
- Founders: Arnold Burgen; Hubert Curien; Umberto Colombo; David Magnusson; Eugen Seibold; Ruurd van Lieshout
- Headquarters: Munich, Germany
- Coordinates: 48°08′53″N 11°34′20″E
- Region served: Europe
- President: Donald Bruce Dingwell
- The Secretary to the Board: David Coates
- Website: ae-info.org

The Academia Europaea is a pan-European non-governmental scientific association acting as an academy. It was founded in 1988 as a Europe-wide institution that encompasses all fields of scholarly inquiry, such as humanities, letters, law, and sciences. It acts as co-ordinator of European interests in national research agencies.

== History ==
The concept of a 'European Academy of Sciences' was raised at a meeting in Paris of the European Ministers of Science in 1985. The initiative was taken by the Royal Society (United Kingdom), which resulted in a meeting in London in June 1986 of Arnold Burgen (United Kingdom), Hubert Curien (France), Umberto Colombo (Italy), David Magnusson (Sweden), Eugen Seibold (Germany) and Ruurd van Lieshout (the Netherlands) – who agreed to the need for a new body. The meeting also included Brian Flowers and John Kendrew. In October 1986, a larger meeting with participants representing some countries in the Council of Europe supported the development of a European academy. The name Academia Europaea was decided on in a meeting in December 1987 as a "linguistically neutral" name.

The foundation meeting was held in Cambridge in September 1988 and Arnold Burgen became the first president of the academy. Hubert Curien, who was at that time the French Minister of Science (and later became the second president of the Academia), gave the inaugural address and provided the active support of the French government. The first Plenary Meeting was held in London in June 1989, by which time there were 627 members. The Royal Society supported Academia Europaea financially as it worked to secure broader funding.

Since 1989, the Academia Europaea has evolved from its origins as an organization of predominantly "western European" scholars into a pan-European Academy of Sciences, Humanities and Letters. The funding of the Academy is based on an original endowment, contributions from some of the member countries, special projects and by other organizations like the Leopoldina, which is also supporting the Academia Europaea financially.

When the European Academies' Science Advisory Council was founded, Academia Europaea became a member.

=== Presidents ===
- Arnold Burgen (1988–1994)
- Hubert Curien (1994–1997)
- Stig Strömholm (1997–2002)
- Jürgen Mittelstraß (2002–2008)
- Lars Walløe (2008–2014)
- Sierd Cloetingh (2014–2021)
- Marja Makarow (2022–2024)
- Donald Bruce Dingwell (2025–)

== Mission ==
Academia Europaea covers a range of subjects, including law, humanities, social sciences, physical sciences, religion and history. Its official mission is defined to:

- promote a wider appreciation of the value of European scholarship and research;
- make recommendations to national governments and international agencies concerning matters affecting science, scholarship and academic life in Europe;
- encourage interdisciplinary and international research in all areas of learning, particularly in relation to European issues;
- identify topics of trans-European importance to science and scholarship, and propose appropriate action to ensure that these issues are adequately studied.

The two key purposes of the Academia Europaea are:

- to express ideas and opinions of individual scientists from Europe;
- to act as co-ordinator of European interests in national research agencies.

The institution does not aim to replace existing national academies. The objectives were kept deliberately broad, covering the humanities, social and natural sciences, so as to ensure interdisciplinary discourse and activities. Initial activities were to include annual meetings of members, multidisciplinary meetings, an interdisciplinary journal, a newsletter, providing independent advice, improving mobility of scholars within Europe and improving public understanding of science.

Impact has been achieved through workshop meetings and reports, for instance to committees under the Council of Europe, on topics such as education, psychosocial problems among the youth, and the development of research academies in specific parts of Europe.

== Awards and prizes ==
- Membership of the Academia Europaea is awarded annually to selected scientists.
- The Erasmus Medal Lecture is awarded to honor individual European scholarship and achievements over a sustained period.
- The Academia Europaea Burgen Scholarships provide recognition to younger European scholars, at the post-doctoral level.
- The Russian Prizes are give to young scientists and scholars in Russia.
- The Gold Medal of the Academia Europaea is awarded to non-members of the Academia and to organizations in recognition of contributions to European science.
- The Adam Kondorosi Academia Europaea Award recognizes research in symbiosis and related fields.

== Publications ==
The Academia Europaea has published European Review (ER) since 1993 on behalf of members and in conjunction with Cambridge University Press (since 1998). It is a quarterly, peer-reviewed, international journal.

== See also ==
- European Academy of Sciences and Arts
- European Academies' Science Advisory Council
