= Katherine O'Doherty =

Irish Republican activist

- Born: Katherine Gibbons; 3 March 1881; Tyrrellspass, County Westmeath, Ireland
- Died: 23 March 1969 (aged 88); Dublin, Ireland
- Children: 6
- Relatives: David O’Doherty (great-grandson)

Katherine O'Doherty (3 March 1881 – 23 March 1969) was an Irish republican and member of Cumann na mBan.

== Early life and family ==
Katherine Gibbons was born on 3 March 1881 in Tyrrellspass, County Westmeath. Her parents were Edward, Royal Irish Constabulary sergeant, and Anne Gibbons (née Crossan). The family home was in Collinstown, County Westmeath. Her father's brother was a priest and chaplain at a public school in Yorkshire, England. He arranged for her to be educated there, and this led to her becoming fluent in German. She attended the Loreto convent, Navan and then entered a teacher training college in Belfast. She taught in a national school in Dublin until 1912. Her sister, Mother Columba of Loreto Convent in Navan, wrote the republican ballad Who fears to speak of Easter week?. She married Séamus O'Doherty in 1911.

== Activism ==
O'Doherty was a supporter of nationalist and other radical causes. She was a member of the Gaelic League and the suffragette movement, through which she became friends with Hanna Sheehy-Skeffington. She worked in soup kitchens organised by Constance Markievicz during the 1913 Lockout. She became a member of Cumann na mBan in 1914, and went on to become quartermaster of the Ard Craobh branch. She stated that the branch drilled regularly, though with poor uniforms and no guns. Commenting on the poor quality of the women's uniforms, O'Doherty commented that they looked "as if they were cut out with a knife and fork". The O'Dohertys stored arms in their house in the run up to the Easter Rising in 1916. O'Doherty moved weapons around Dublin, and organised concerts to fund raise for the Irish Volunteers. This led to the police watching their house, but her husband's job as a travelling salesman provided ample cover for their activities. The Irish Republican Brotherhood member, Bulmer Hobson, who opposed the Easter Rising was detained at the O'Doherty home until the Rising had begun.

Her husband had been tasked by Tom Clarke in rebuilding the IRB after the Rising, with the temporary supreme council meeting at their home at 32 Connaught Street, Phibsborough. From 1916 to 1917, O'Doherty worked full-time as the voluntary secretary and trustee of the National Aid Society Office. The Society was a charity to support the families of those killed or imprisoned after the 1916 Rising. She is acknowledged as being partly responsible for the appointment of Michael Collins as the paid secretary of the organisation in February 1917. Their house continued to be a meeting place, and later a safe house, for republicans.

O'Doherty supported her husband's campaign to get republican candidates elected as MPs, and devised the campaign slogan for Joe McGuinness in the South Longford by-election: "Put him in to get him out." In May 1918, her husband was arrested as part of the "German plot" which led to his imprisonment and resulted in him not standing as a candidate in the 1918 parliamentary elections. She ran as a Sinn Féin candidate in a Dublin corporation election, and missed out by four votes. Soon after this she was elected a poor law guardian. After an attempt on her husband's life, he left for Philadelphia in December 1919 to help with republican diplomatic efforts in the United States. O'Doherty and their children joined him there in August 1920. In Philadelphia, O'Doherty wrote and edited articles for the Irish-American newspaper, the Irish Press and established an American branch of Cumann na mBan. She also took part in anti-British protests, and organised the collection of medicines, clothing and food for distressed families in Ireland.

After the treaty in 1921, O'Doherty was firmly anti-treaty, as she was personally loyal to Éamon de Valera, whom she knew through his wife Sinéad. In the summer of 1922, she travelled to Ireland to hand deliver $50,000 to the anti-treaty republican side. She was the ghost writer of Dan Breen's autobiography, My fight for Irish freedom in 1923 to 1924. She based the work on her conversations with Breen and his notes. The O'Doherty family returned to Dublin in August 1923 to live on Claude Road, Drumcondra. While her husband withdrew from political life, O'Doherty remained an ardent supporter of de Valera. In May 1926, she was present at the formation of Fianna Fáil at the La Scala theatre, Dublin. She was an active member of the party's Glasnevin cumann. She wrote and published an account of de Valera's time in the United States from 1919 to 1920 in collaboration with de Valera, Assignment America: de Valera's mission to the United States.

== Later life and family ==
The O'Dohertys had two daughters and four sons, including Roisin, Kevin and Feichin. O'Doherty died on 23 March 1969 in a home in Blackrock, County Dublin, and was buried with her husband in Glasnevin Cemetery.
