= EFPA =

EFPA may refer to:

- Equivalent Flat Plate Area [m^{2}] - used in aircraft drag force calculations
- Erlang fixed point approximation formula devised in 1917 by Agner Krarup Erlang
- European Federation of Psychologists' Associations
- European Financial Planning Association
