= Friedhelm Hummel =

German neuroscientist and neurologist

Professor Friedhelm Christoph Hummel
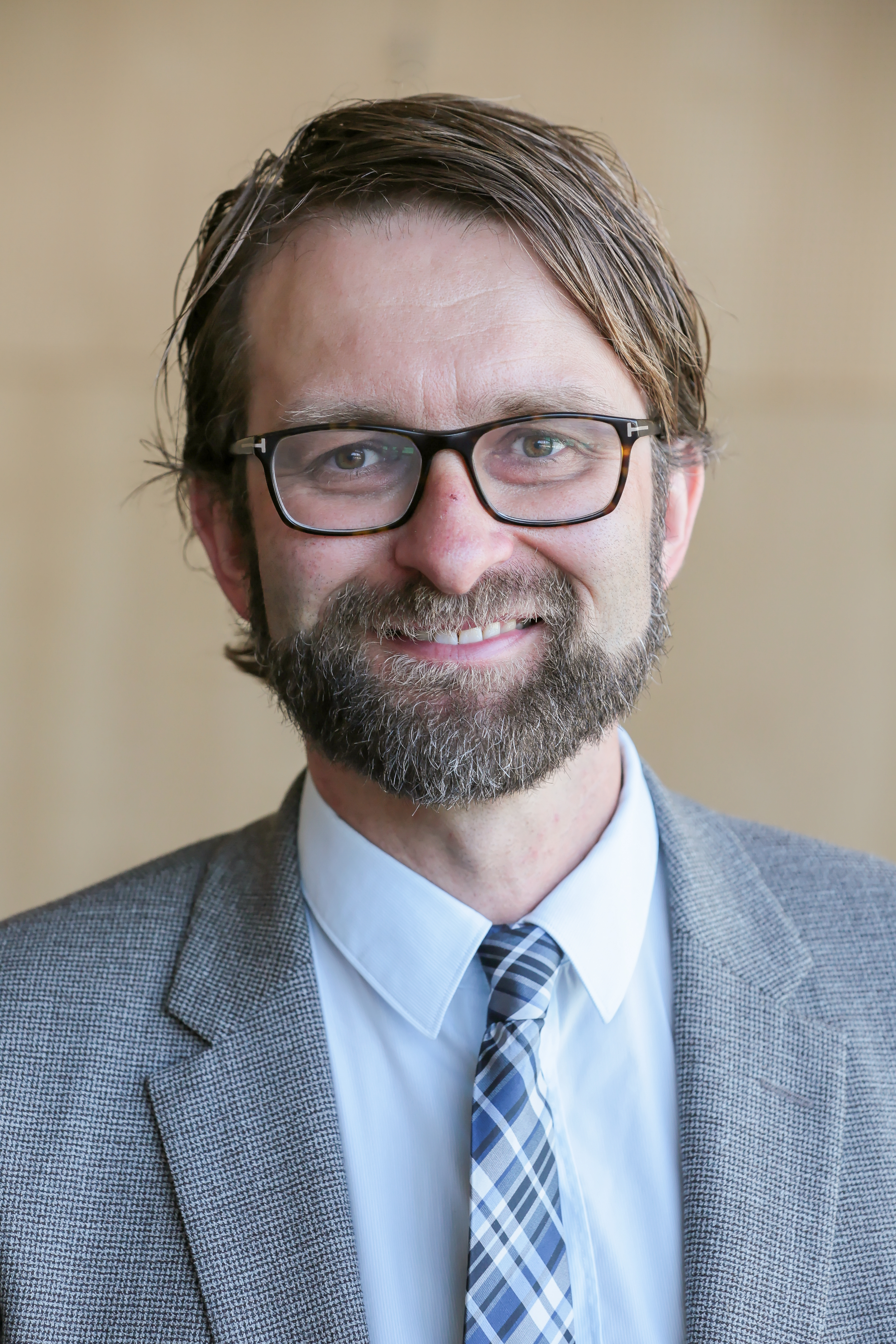
- Friedhelm Hummel in 2016
- Born: 1969 (age 56–57); Laichingen, Germany
- Citizenship: Germany
- Known for: Neurorehabilitation
- Awards: Felgenhauer Symposiums Prize; Prize of the German Society of Neurotraumatology and Clinical Neurorehabilitation; Dr. Martini Prize

Academic background
- Education: Medicine
- Alma mater: University of Tübingen; University of Bordeaux
- Thesis: Elastische Veränderungen durch semantische klassische Konditionierung und ihre elektrokortikalen Korrelate: eine Studie langsamer Potentiale (2000)
- Academic advisor: Niels Birbaumer

Academic work
- Discipline: Neuroscience
- Sub-discipline: Neurorehabilitation
- Institutions: EPFL (École Polytechnique Fédérale de Lausanne)
- Main interests: Stroke recovery Motor control Neuroplasticity; Non-invasive brain stimulation Structural and functional neuroimaging
- Website: https://www.epfl.ch/labs/hummel-lab/

Friedhelm Christoph Hummel (born 1969 in Laichingen, Germany) is a German neuroscientist and neurologist. A full professor at École Polytechnique Fédérale de Lausanne, he is the Defitech Chair of Clinical Neuroengineering, and the head of the Hummel Laboratory at EPFL's School of Life Sciences. He also is an associate professor of clinical neuroscience at the University of Geneva.

== Career ==
Hummel studied medicine at University of Tübingen and at Bordeaux Segalen University, graduating in 1998. He then joined the Department of Neurology at the University of Tübingen as a medical resident and researcher. He earned his medical doctor degree in 2000 for his work on Plastische Veränderungen durch semantische klassische Konditionierung und ihre elektrokortikalen Korrelate: eine Studie langsamer Potentiale (Plastic changes through semantic classical conditioning and their electrocortical correlates: a study of slow potentials).

In 2003, he received a Feodor Lynen award from the Alexander von Humboldt Foundation to join Leonardo Cohen's Human Cortical Physiology and Neurorehabilitation Section (NINDS) at the National Institutes of Health (NIH) at Bethesda. There he worked on the first successful application of transcranial direct current stimulation (tDCS) in stroke patients. In 2005, he returned as researcher and medical resident to the Department of Neurology at Tübingen, and, in 2006, to the University Medical Center Hamburg-Eppendorf to finish his residency. In 2006, he founded the Brain Imaging and Neurostimulation (BINS) Laboratory at Hamburg, became a certified in 2007, co-chairman at the Centre for Sleep Medicine in 2008, senior neurologist in 2013, and vice-director of the Department of neurology in 2013.

Since 2016 he holds the Defitech Chair for Clinical Neuroengineering as full professor, is the director of the Hummel Laboratory at the Centre for Neuroprosthetics (CNP) and the Brain Mind Institute (BMI), both at EPFL. Furthermore, he holds an associate professorship of clinical neuroscience at the University of Geneva.

== Research ==
Hummel's research targets the fields of systems and translational clinical neuroscience with three main areas of focus.

The first focus is on using multimodal imaging and behavioral measures to study neuroplasticity, neuronal control of sensorimotor functions, learning, and cognitive functions in healthy and neurological disorders, such as stroke, mild cognitive impairment (MCI) or traumatic brain injury (TBI).

The second main focus is on developing innovative non-invasive interventional strategies based on neurotechnology, such as brain stimulation to support patients' residual functions and enhance recovery. He has been involved in the application of non-invasive brain stimulation in stroke.

The third focus is the use of multimodal imaging to predict outcome and course of recovery after a stroke (Koch et al. 2021 Brain; Egger et al. 2021 Stroke), a prerequisite for personalized treatment strategies.

His research has been featured in news outlets such as NZZ, Le Nouvelliste, Physics World, Der Spiegel, and Focus.

== Distinctions ==
Hummel is the recipient of the 2015 Felgenhauer Symposiums Prize of the German Neurological Society and the Felgenhauer Foundation; the 2013 prize of the German Society of Neurotraumatology and Clinical Neurorehabilitation; the 2010 Dr. Martini Prize; the 2005 Susanne Klein-Vogelbach Prize; 2005 Fellows Award for Research Excellence by the National Institutes of Health; and the 2003 Feodor Lynen Research Fellowship Award by the Alexander von Humboldt Foundation.

He is a member of the German Neurological Society, the Society for Neuroscience, and the Society for the Neural Control of Movement.

== Selected works ==
- Nitsche, Michael A.; Cohen, Leonardo G.; Wassermann, Eric M.; Priori, Alberto; Lang, Nicolas; Antal, Andrea; Paulus, Walter; Hummel, Friedhelm; Boggio, Paulo S.; Fregni, Felipe; Pascual-Leone, Alvaro (July 2008). "Transcranial direct current stimulation: State of the art 2008". Brain Stimulation. 1 (3): 206–223. doi:10.1016/j.brs.2008.06.004. ISSN 1935-861X. PMID 20633386. S2CID 16352598.
- Lefaucheur, Jean-Pascal; André-Obadia, Nathalie; Antal, Andrea; Ayache, Samar S.; Baeken, Chris; Benninger, David H.; Cantello, Roberto M.; Cincotta, Massimo; de Carvalho, Mamede; De Ridder, Dirk; Devanne, Hervé (November 2014). "Evidence-based guidelines on the therapeutic use of repetitive transcranial magnetic stimulation (rTMS)". Clinical Neurophysiology. 125 (11): 2150–2206. doi:10.1016/j.clinph.2014.05.021. ISSN 1388-2457. PMID 25034472. S2CID 206798663.
- Gandiga, Prateek C.; Hummel, Friedhelm C.; Cohen, Leonardo G. (April 2006). "Transcranial DC stimulation (tDCS): A tool for double-blind sham-controlled clinical studies in brain stimulation". Clinical Neurophysiology. 117 (4): 845–850. doi:10.1016/j.clinph.2005.12.003. ISSN 1388-2457. PMID 16427357. S2CID 25934876.
- Hummel, F. (2005-01-05). "Effects of non-invasive cortical stimulation on skilled motor function in chronic stroke". Brain. 128 (3): 490–499. doi:10.1093/brain/awh369. ISSN 1460-2156. PMID 15634731.
- Hummel, Friedhelm C; Cohen, Leonardo G (August 2006). "Non-invasive brain stimulation: a new strategy to improve neurorehabilitation after stroke?". The Lancet Neurology. 5 (8): 708–712. doi:10.1016/s1474-4422(06)70525-7. ISSN 1474-4422. PMID 16857577. S2CID 9509765.
- Pulvermüller, Friedemann; Härle, Markus; Hummel, Friedhelm (2001-08-01). "Walking or Talking?: Behavioral and Neurophysiological Correlates of Action Verb Processing". Brain and Language. 78 (2): 143–168. doi:10.1006/brln.2000.2390. ISSN 0093-934X. PMID 11500067. S2CID 40912475.
- Sauseng, Paul; Klimesch, Wolfgang; Heise, Kirstin F.; Gruber, Walter R.; Holz, Elisa; Karim, Ahmed A.; Glennon, Mark; Gerloff, Christian; Birbaumer, Niels; Hummel, Friedhelm C. (2009). "Brain Oscillatory Substrates of Visual Short-Term Memory Capacity". Current Biology. 19 (21): 1846–1852. Bibcode:2009CBio...19.1846S. doi:10.1016/j.cub.2009.08.062. hdl:10379/13801. PMID 19913428. S2CID 13999952.
- Fridman, E. A.; Hanakawa, T.; Chung, M.; Hummel, F.; Leiguarda, R. C.; Cohen, L. G. (2004). "Reorganization of the human ipsilesional premotor cortex after stroke". Brain. 127 (4): 747–758. doi:10.1093/brain/awh082. PMID 14749291.
- Antal, A.; et al. (2017). "Low intensity transcranial electric stimulation: Safety, ethical, legal regulatory and application guidelines". Clinical Neurophysiology. 128 (9): 1774–1809. doi:10.1016/j.clinph.2017.06.001. PMC 5985830. PMID 28709880.
- Sauseng, P.; Hoppe, J.; Klimesch, W.; Gerloff, C.; Hummel, F. C. (2007). "Dissociation of sustained attention from central executive functions: Local activity and interregional connectivity in the theta range". European Journal of Neuroscience. 25 (2): 587–593. doi:10.1111/j.1460-9568.2006.05286.x. PMID 17284201. S2CID 3487768.
- Duque, Julie; Hummel, Friedhelm; Celnik, Pablo; Murase, Nagako; Mazzocchio, Riccardo; Cohen, Leonardo G. (2005). "Transcallosal inhibition in chronic subcortical stroke". NeuroImage. 28 (4): 940–946. doi:10.1016/j.neuroimage.2005.06.033. PMID 16084737. S2CID 39285099.
