= St Patrick's College, Dublin =

Former college of education, merged into Dublin City University in 2016

St Patrick’s College, Drumcondra
- Coláiste Phádraig
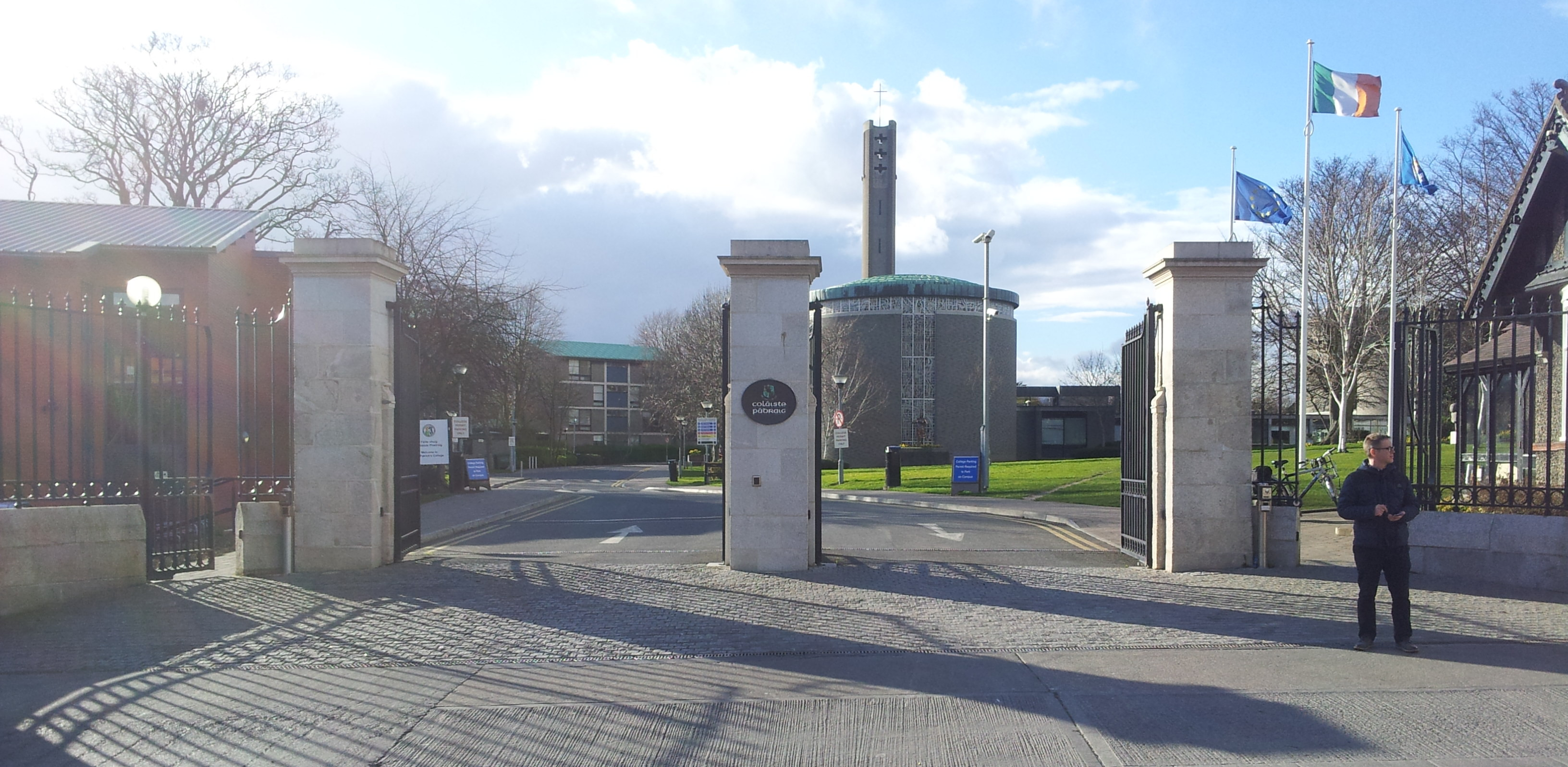
- St Patrick's College, Drumcondra
- Other name: St Pat's
- Motto: Intellectum da mihi, Domine
- Motto in English: Give me understanding, Lord
- Type: Roman Catholic
- Active: 1875–2016
- Religious affiliation: Congregation of the Mission (Vincentians; 1883–1999)
- Academic affiliations: National University of Ireland (1975–95); Dublin City University (1995–2016)
- President: Daire Keogh
- Students: 2,400 (2016)
- Location: Drumcondra, Dublin, Ireland; 53.3704°N 6.2544°W
- Campus: Urban
- Colours: Blue, white, yellow
- Website: web.archive.org/web/20040412185449/http://www.spd.dcu.ie

St Patrick's College (Irish: Coláiste Phádraig), often known as St Pat's, was a third level institution in Ireland, the leading function of which was as the country's largest primary teacher training college, which had at one time up to 2,000 students. Founded in Drumcondra, in the northern suburbs of Dublin, in 1875, with a Roman Catholic ethos, it offered a number of undergraduate courses, primarily in primary education and arts, and in time postgraduate courses too, mostly in education and languages.

On 30 September 2016, St Patrick's was dissolved as an institution and incorporated into Dublin City University, along with Mater Dei Institute of Education, All Hallows College, and the Church of Ireland College of Education. The teacher training elements of those combined institutions currently form DCU's fifth faculty, the DCU Institute of Education. All humanities-based courses at the former St Patrick's were then absorbed by DCU's Faculty of Humanities and Social Sciences. The campus of the former college is now known as DCU St Patrick's Campus.

== History ==
=== Early years ===
The college was established at 1–2 Drumcondra Road in 1875, moving to Belvedere House in 1883 after its purchase by the Catholic Archbishop of Dublin from the Christian Brothers, when the Congregation of the Mission (Vincentian) community took over the running of the college. In its first 25 years over 2,000 students graduated from the college. The college trained male students to become primary school teachers; other colleges trained female teachers.

In 1894, a national school (primary) was established on campus and students would practice there.

=== 20th century ===
The campus was redeveloped using a design by Andrew Devane in the 1960s. This involved the construction of a number of new buildings, which incorporated the historical fabric of the older buildings on the site. A new church and residential blocks were also part of the scheme. Female students were admitted from 1971.

==== Linkage with Dublin City University ====
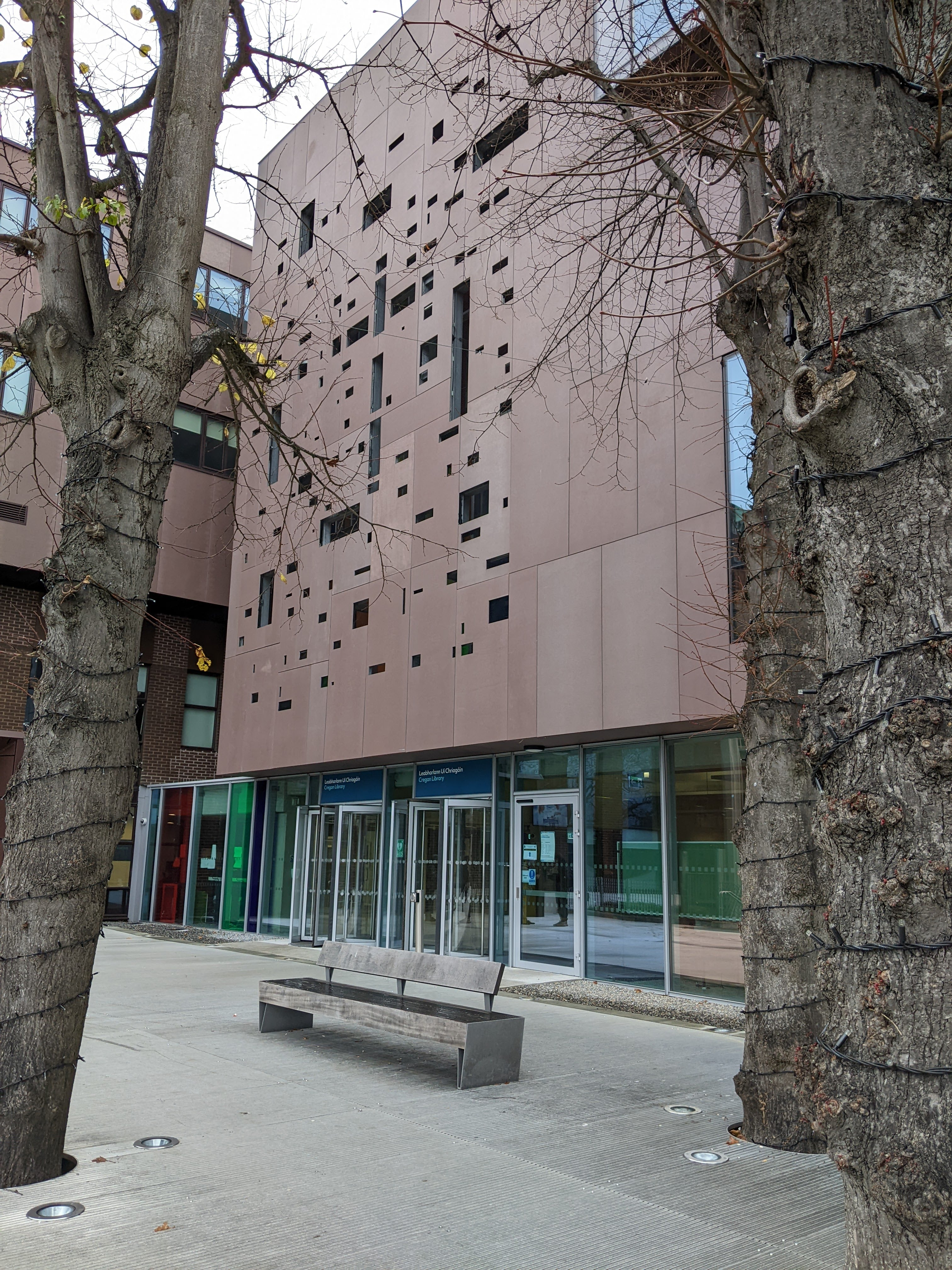
Cregan Library, St Patrick's College in November 2022

St Patrick's College of Education was a recognised college of the National University of Ireland from 1975 to 1995. In 1993, the college commenced its association with the nearby Dublin City University (DCU) which had been raised to university status in 1989. In 1995 the college of education formally ended its connection with the NUI and became a college of DCU.

The college developed a number of arts and humanities undergraduate and postgraduate courses with DCU.

The Vincentian administration of the college ended in 1999. In 2008 the college, along with other local education colleges, Mater Dei and All Hallows, signed a new linkage agreement with Dublin City University. In May 2012, it was announced that there would be a €40 million investment in facilities at the college to provide for 2,500 students.

==== Presidents of the College ====
Daire Keogh, of the history department, was the 14th and last president of the college, from 2012 to 2016, taking over from fellow historian Pauric Travers (1999-2012), in September 2012. Travers had been the first lay president of the college when appointed in 1999. Previous presidents of the college have included Peter Byrne (1883-1919) when the Vincentian order came to the college (earlier the head of the college would have been termed the Superior), Jerome Twomey (1942-1948), Donal Cregan (1957-1976) and Simon (Sam) Clyne (1985-1999). Keogh later became the fourth president of Dublin City University.

== Belvedere House ==
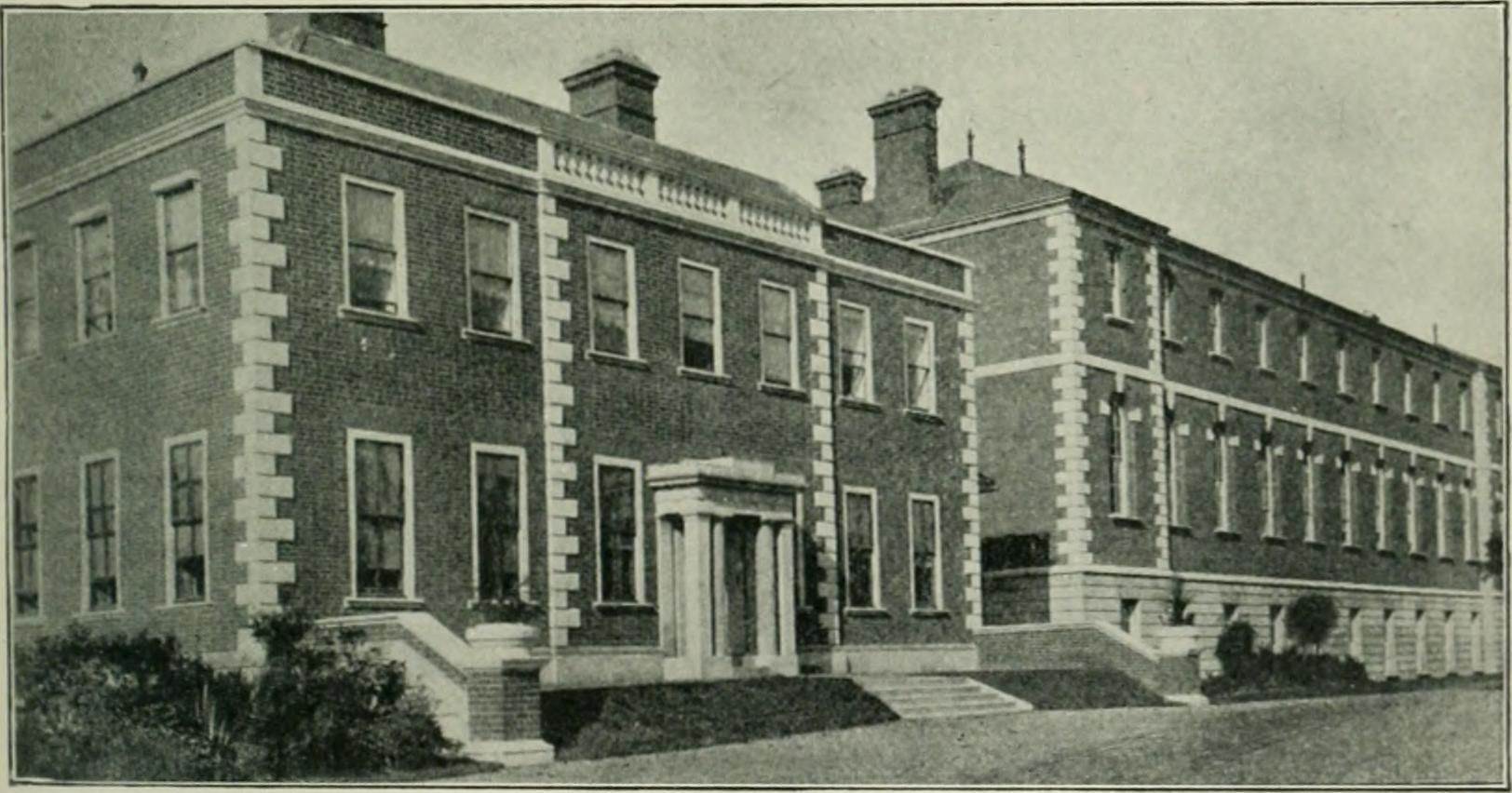
Belvedere House, St Patrick's campus, DCU

Notable buildings on the campus include Belvedere House which was built c. 1660 by Robert Booth, Lord Chief Justice of Ireland.

Residents of the house included:

- Marmaduke Coghill, Chancellor of the Exchequer of Ireland
- Henry Singleton, MP for Drogheda and later Chief Justice of the Irish Common Pleas
- John Bowes, 1st Baron Bowes, Lord Chancellor of Ireland
- James Hewitt, 1st Viscount Lifford, Lord Chancellor of Ireland, and former MP for Coventry
- Richard Robinson, 1st Baron Rokeby, Church of Ireland Archbishop of Armagh. Lord Rokeby founded, in 1790, Armagh Observatory.

The Congregation of Christian Brothers established a novitiate in the house prior to transferring to Coláiste Mhuire, Marino, in 1875, when they sold Belvedere House to Cardinal Cullen for £3,000 for the establishment of the college.

== Faculty and departments ==
The college was divided into two faculties, Education and Humanities. From the time of its affiliation to DCU, the college's offering of humanities programmes increased.

=== Faculty of Education ===
- Education
- Religious studies and education
- Special education
- Bioscience
- Human development

=== Faculty of Humanities ===
- English
- Irish (Roinn na Gaeilge)
- Mathematics
- French
- History
- Geography
- Music

== Student services and students' union ==
St Pat's provided a variety of student services such as career advice, access support, mature student support, medical and welfare services and an international office.

The college also had a students' union which oversaw clubs such as GAA, rugby, soccer, and other pursuits, and societies for drama, St Vincent De Paul, and a choral society.

St Pat's Students' Union had two sabbatical positions and seven non-sabbatical positions. In 2015, students voted to change the structure of the union.

== Sport ==
=== Erin's Hope ===
St Patrick's College was invited to enter a team in the Dublin Senior Football Championship under the name Erin's Hope. Erin's Hope were Dublin senior football champions in 1887, 1932, 1956 and 1978. In 2007, Erin's Hope failed to field a team for the Dublin championship and had to withdraw from the tournament.

== Alumni ==
Notable alumni of the college include:

- Patrick Breen - teacher and president of the Gaelic Athletic Association (1924-1926)
- Patrick Deeley - poet and memoirist
- James "Cha" Fitzpatrick - Kilkenny All Ireland-winning hurler
- Paddy Hogan - Kilkenny senior hurler
- Richie Hogan - 2014 Hurler of the Year
- Brendan Howlin - TD, Minister for Health, Environment and Public Expenditure & Reform, leader of the Irish Labour Party
- Enda Kenny - 13th Taoiseach (Irish prime minister)
- Ciarán Kilkenny - Dublin All Ireland-winning footballer
- Chris Lawlor - historian and author.
- Bryan MacMahon - writer (1909-1998)
- Patrick McCabe - novelist
- Mattie McDonagh - Galway footballer (1936–2005)
- John McGahern - writer (1934–2006)
- Páid McGee - psychologist and educator
- Michael Noonan - Minister for Finance
- Máirtín Ó Cadhain - writer and Republican (1906–1970)
- Peadar O'Donnell - writer and Republican (1893–1986)
- Mícheál Ó Muircheartaigh - broadcaster
- Brian O'Shea - former minister for health, agriculture, food and forestry
- John D Ruddy - YouTuber
- Don Wycherley - actor
- Hector Ó hEochagáin - television presenter
