= Séamus O'Doherty =

Irish Republican activist

- Born: 11 June 1882; Derry, Ireland
- Died: 23 August 1945 (aged 63); Mater Hospital, Dublin, Ireland
- Children: 6
- Relatives: David O’Doherty (great-grandson)

Séamus O'Doherty (11 June 1882 – 23 August 1945) was an Irish republican.

== Early life and family ==
Séamus O'Doherty was born on 11 June 1882 in Derry. His parents were Michael, butcher, and Rose O'Doherty (née McLaughlin). The family lived at 23 Creggan Street, and were wealthy, with his father owning several butcher shops. He attended Newbridge College, County Kildare, and later entered the Dominican house at Tallaght, County Dublin while he considered taking a religious vocation. In Tallaght, he studied for a Royal University of Ireland arts degree, concluding that he did not have a vocation, he returned to Derry. He served as the honorary branch secretary of the Gaelic League in Derry. His brother, Joseph was also active in the IRA and politics. He married Catherine Gibbons in 1911.

== Role in 1916 ==
In 1913, O'Doherty joined the Irish Volunteers, and was involved in planning the Easter Rising in 1916. The O'Dohertys stored arms in their house in advance of the uprising. This led to the police watching their house, but his job as a travelling salesman provided ample cover for their activities. The Irish Republican Brotherhood ordered him to detain Bulmer Hobson, an IRB member who objected to the Easter Rising, and kept him under armed guard until the events of Easter Monday had begun. He released Hobson in the evening of Easter Monday, and O'Doherty reported to Tom Clarke at the General Post Office. Clarke ordered him to lie low and rebuild the IRB after the Rising. O'Doherty avoided arrest after the Rising, and was supported by Clarke's widow, Kathleen, in May 1916 with his re-establishment of a temporary supreme council of the IRB. This council met at the O'Dohertys' home at 32 Connaught Street, Phibsborough. John Devoy acknowledged O'Doherty's authority as caretaker leader of the IRB supreme council in September 1916. Their house continued to be a meeting place, and later a safe house, for republicans.

== Role after 1916 ==
O'Doherty was familiar with Ulster unionists from Derry, and acknowledged that they would not support an Irish republic, believing that further military action was likely to lead to Ireland being partitioned. He was in favour of planned civil disobedience rather than violent resistance. He urged the IRB to seek a mandate for the Irish republic through elections, which could be leveraged to get international recognition for the cause. He proposed that a republican candidate stand in the North Roscommon by-election in early 1917, but the IRB supreme council refused to fund it. He had support from other individuals however, and he secured support and canvassed for Count George Noble Plunkett, who ran as the republican candidate in the by-election. He acted as Plunkett's campaign manager, and with Michael O'Flanagan orchestrated a successful campaign, leading to Plunkett's victory. This ultimately led to nationalist organisations uniting under the Sinn Féin banner and convinced many militants of the potential power in constitutional methods. Due to his prominence in the Roscommon election, O'Doherty was arrested on 22 February 1917 and deported to Leominster where he reported to the local police daily. He escaped back to Ireland to participate in a successful Sinn Féin by-election campaign which elected the imprisoned Joseph McGuinness in South Longford. It was his wife, Katherine, who came up with the campaign slogan, "Put him in to get him out."

O'Doherty became marginalised during 1917 to 1918, as he lacked the personal ambition and was more unassuming than other members, and felt more ambiguous towards the use to violence. Due to this, and factors relating to the IRB remaining an oath-bound secret society after the Easter Rising, he withdrew from the IRB. His short time in the organisation did convince the leadership to pursue democratic endorsement from the Irish people. During the same period, O'Doherty wrote for two underground journals with anti-conscription material, and stored and hid arms and ammunition in his house which could be used to resist conscription. In May 1918, he was arrested as part of the "German plot" which led to his imprisonment and resulted in him not standing as a candidate in the 1918 parliamentary elections. His wife ran as a Sinn Féin candidate in a Dublin corporation election, and missed out by four votes. Soon after this she was elected a poor law guardian. O'Doherty was arrested again in June 1919, and was charged by court martial for possessing a rifle and ammunition stored at his house. He was not granted political status as a prisoner in Mountjoy Prison, which he protested through a hunger strike with fellow republican prisoners. He was released and transferred to the Mater Hospital after 19 days on 30 October, and though in poor health, he discharged himself that day and returned home.

Though the chances of rearrest were very high, O'Doherty refused to go on the run. As he entered his home in late November 1919, he narrowly escaped a bullet that missed him. This attack was in response to the killing of a detective by the IRA in July, which O'Doherty had played no part in. This led him to leave for Philadelphia in December 1919, hoping that diplomatic efforts in the United States might be successful. In August 1920, his family joined him there. He worked for a firm of church furnishers, and wrote articles for an Irish-American newspaper, the Irish Press, which was edited by his old friend Patrick McCartan. He became editor of the paper in 1920, but it closed in May 1922 due to lack of finances. He was horrified by the 1921 partitioning of Ireland, the Civil War in 1922. He attempted to remain unbiased, but he leaned towards the anti-treaty side. His wife was firmly anti-treaty.

== Later life and family ==
The O'Doherty family returned to Dublin in August 1923. O'Doherty took up work as a commercial representative for CJ Fallon Ltd from 1923 to 1930, and Messrs Bull Ltd from 1930 to 1940. He stopped all political participation and retained friends from both sides of the Civil War while opposing all republican violence post-1923. In 1932, he turned down an invitation to join the Fianna Fáil party and in 1934 an appointment as a senior civil servant in the stationery office by the Fianna Fáil government. His wife, Katherine, was an ardent supporter of de Valera and Fianna Fáil.

The O'Dohertys had two daughters and four sons, including Roisin, Kevin and Feichin. O'Doherty died on 23 August 1945 in the Mater Hospital, and is buried in Glasnevin Cemetery. Some of his personal papers and memorabilia are held in the National Archives of Ireland.
