= Mater Dei Institute of Education =

- Institiúid Oideachais Mater Dei
- Motto: Sapientiam et Intelligentium
- Type: Roman Catholic
- Active: 1966–2016
- Affiliations: St. Patrick's College, Maynooth(1966-1999), Dublin City University(1999-2016)
- President: Monsignor Dermot Lane
- Provost: The Roman Catholic Archbishop of Dublin (Patron)
- Principal: Dr Andrew McGrady PhD (Director)
- Administrative staff: 43
- Students: 800
- Location: Drumcondra, Dublin, Ireland; 53.363614°N 6.255598°W
- Website: www.materdei.ie

Mater Dei Institute of Education (Irish: Institiúid Oideachais Mater Dei) was a linked college of Dublin City University from 1999 until its closure in 2016, located in Drumcondra, Dublin City, Ireland, near Croke Park, on the site of what was formerly Clonliffe College, the Roman Catholic Seminary for the Archdiocese of Dublin. The college was founded by Archbishop John Charles McQuaid in 1966 as an institute for the training and formation for teachers of religion in secondary schools in the Republic of Ireland. Clonliffe was also affiliated to the Angelicum in Rome that offered a three-year course leading to a diploma and a four-year course leading to a master's degree; Fr. Joseph Carroll was its first president. Other Presidents of the College included Msgr. Michael Nolan, Dr. Dermot Lane and Sr. Eileen Randles IBVN (1986-1995). The foundation of the college was a response to the challenges posed by the Second Vatican Council. It had a Roman Catholic ethos and had approximately 800 students.

The college closed on 30 November 2016 when it was fully incorporated into the DCU Institute of Education, within which is The Mater Dei Centre for Catholic Education (MDCCE) continuing its mission.

The college offered several undergraduate courses, primarily in secondary religious education and specialized its postgraduate courses (including Doctorates) in religion, the humanities and education, and faith and culture as well as theology and philosophy in dialogue. The BA and MA in Religious Science were accredited by Maynooth(Pontifical University) which Mater Dei was affiliated to.

In 1999 Mater Dei Institute of Education became a College of Dublin City University.

In 2002 it established an Irish Studies Department and offered a BA programme in Religious Studies and Irish Studies. The Institute saw this as a contribution to the understanding what was engendered by the Good Friday Agreement. The Institute also had links with colleges in Northern Ireland, France, Italy and the USA. Mater Dei partners with the Methodist Edgehill Theological College (Belfast) co-offering such programmes as a BTh exploring faith together.

In 2008 the relationship linking Dublin City University with All Hallows, St. Patrick's College of Education, Drumcondra and Mater Dei Institute of Education was revised.

The Institute was engaged in the Erasmus student exchange programme with other colleges in Austria, Belgium, England, France, Germany, Greece, Italy, Malta, Portugal and Spain.

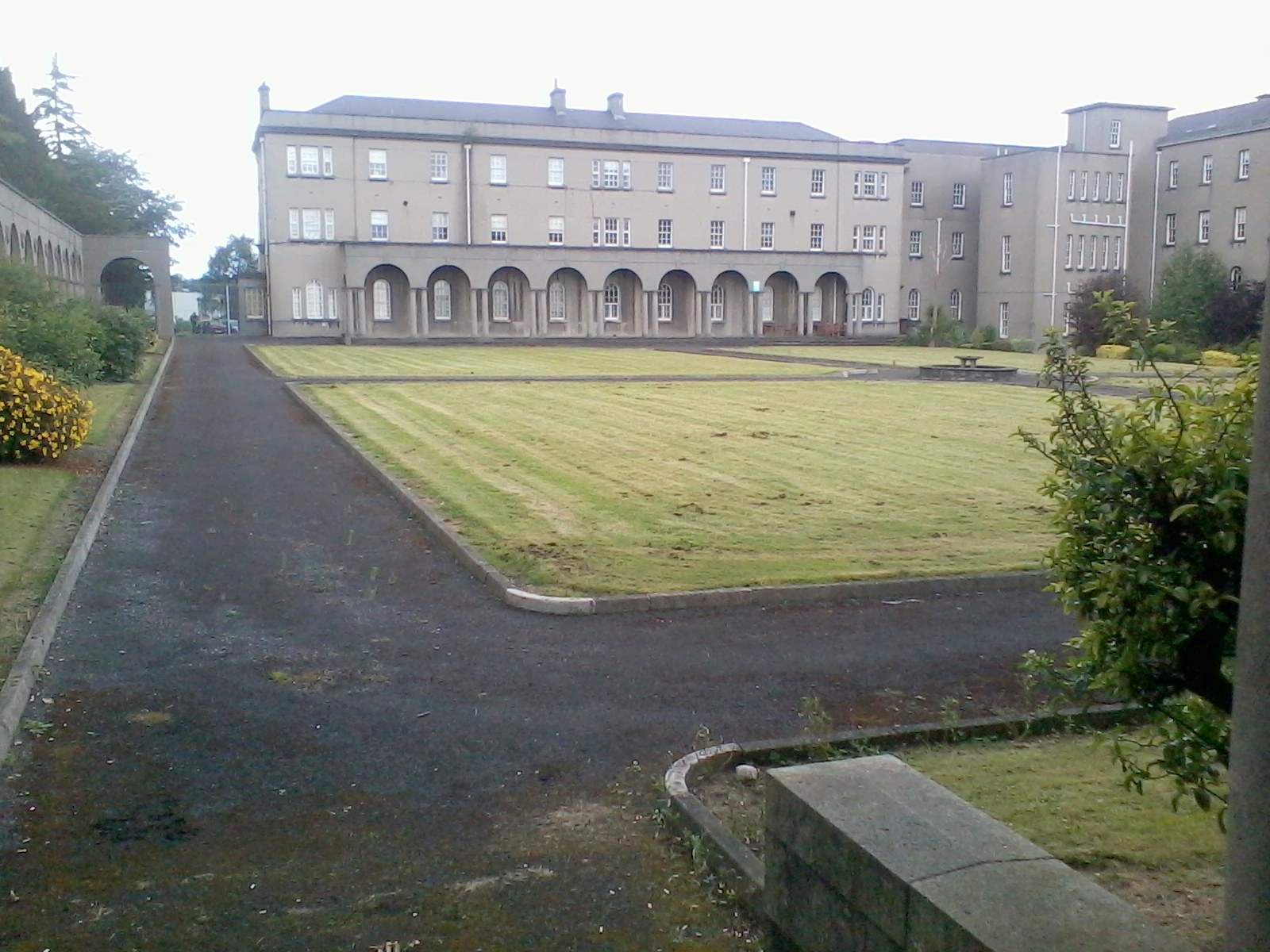
A photo of the former Mater Dei campus on Clonliffe Road, Dublin
