= Orange (song) =

2007 single by David O'Doherty

Single by David O'Doherty
- Released: February 2007
- Recorded: 2007
- Genre: Comedy rock
- Length: 3:59
- Label: Independent
- Songwriter(s): David O'Doherty
- Producer(s): David O'Doherty

"Orange" is a song performed by Irish comedian David O'Doherty. It was released on CD in February 2007 as part of his attempts to have a "Minor" hit single, preferably at #27 in the charts. The exploits of O'Doherty trying to have this "hit" was featured in an episode of his TV series, The Modest Adventures of David O'Doherty.

The song was written and recorded by David O'Doherty, and was recorded onto standard CD-R discs using his own laptop to do so. His phone number was written on the back of the single's (also homemade) artwork so that if the people who bought it couldn't get it to play, they could contact him and he would play them the song over the phone.

== Song promotion ==
Fewer than 312 singles were produced, as it usually only takes this number of single sales to enter the Irish Single Chart top 30. As such, the physical single is now a rare collector's item for fans of his.

The song received limited airplay on the radio due to profanity in the lyrics towards the end of the song. However, O'Doherty showed up to various radio stations, such as Rick O'Shea's 2FM show, to perform a version of the single live in order to promote it.

The single was launched at the branch of Oxfam on Parliament Street in Dublin. However, at the launch, people couldn't buy the single as it wouldn't register in the Singles chart. The CD was only available in two stores: Tower Records and Road Records, both in Dublin.

== Song content ==
The song itself features a catchy, bouncy beat combined with a calmly sung verse and a drumming chorus.

It tells the story about a man that works in a photocopy shop who makes his own badges. He has never had any luck with women and was too shy to ask any of them out on a date. At the same time, there is a woman who got fired from the pizza parlour where she worked, as she was a militant vegetarian and tried to make all the pizzas vegetarian too. She never got asked out either. She was a fan of Garfield and took a poster into the photocopy shop where the man was working. They struck up a conversation and arranged to go out to a pub on a date. However she turned up to the date wearing a lot of badly applied fake tan. Hence, she is "orange" in colour.

The man was seriously put off by this and wanted to end the date, but instead she leaves him when he orders a packet of bacon snacks because this goes against her beliefs as a vegetarian. The song ends with the man and woman realising that they weren't meant for each other after all.

The song's lyrics reference many random orange items such as Garfield, Fanta, Tonka Trucks and the Oompa Loompas from the film, Willy Wonka & the Chocolate Factory.

== Music video ==
The music video features the story of the song being acted out, interspersed with scenes of O'Doherty singing in a white suit on a beach. On his TV show, he noted how the biggest selling Irish artists like Westlife, Boyzone or Johnny Logan, usually wore white suits in their music videos. In this way, he hoped to emulate their success.

The part of the man is played by fellow Irish comedian Bernard O'Shea. The video can be seen on YouTube. The song famously ended with the man leaving and saying the line "that shit, that shit is fucking insane" (referring to her bad fake tan use).

== Chart performance ==
The song reached #30 in the Irish singles charts. O'Doherty had been hoping it would reach #27, but this position was held by Jibbs's song "Chain Hang Low". He was still happy with his "success", as it meant he had a minor chart hit. The song is now considered a cult hit by O'Doherty's many fans.
