= Páid McGee =

Irish psychologist (died 2018)

- Died: 2018; Rathgar, Dublin, Ireland
- Education: St Patrick's College, Dublin; University College Dublin
- Scientific career
- Workplaces: St Patrick's College, Dublin

Páid McGee was an Irish psychologist and educator.

== Career ==
McGee was born in Aughnacliffe, County Longford. He initially trained as a teacher at St Patrick's College, Dublin. He then completed a BA, HDip in Ed., and M Psych degree at University College Dublin. He returned to St Patrick's College, Dublin, where he was director of the special education department from 1967 to 2003 and where he established the Diploma in Special Education. In 1961, he helped to establish the Teachers’ Study Group which conducted the first survey of reading comprehension in Dublin primary schools.

He was a founding member of the Psychological Society of Ireland (PSI) of which he became president in 1975. He was joint author with Paul Andrews of the PSI policy document A Psychological Service for Schools (1975) and campaigned for many years for the establishment of a school psychological service. Eventually the National Educational Psychological Service (NEPS) was established as an agency of the Department of Education and Skills. He was also joint editor of the Irish Journal of Psychology.

He died on 29 November 2018 in Rathgar, Dublin.

== Publications ==
- McGee, P. (1990). Special Education in Ireland. European Journal of Special Needs Education, 5(1), 48–64.

== Awards ==
- 2012: Honorary Doctorate, Dublin City University
- Honorary Life Member, Irish Association of Teachers in Special Education
- 2003: Allianz/Scoil Treasa Naofa Annual Award for Services to Education on the Island of Ireland
