= European Psychologist =

- Discipline: Psychology
- Language: English
- Edited by: Christoph Steinebach

Publication details
- Publisher: Hogrefe Publishing
- Frequency: Quarterly
- Impact factor: 5 (2012)

Standard abbreviations
- ISO 4: Eur. Psychol.

Indexing
- ISSN: 1016-9040 (print); 1878-531X (web)
- OCLC no.: 60626459

Links
- Journal homepage; Online access; Open access

European Psychologist is a quarterly peer-reviewed academic journal within the field of psychology. The journal was established in 1996 as the official organ of the European Federation of Psychologists' Associations, and is published by Hogrefe Publishing. The editor-in-chief is Christoph Steinebach, of the Zurich University of Applied Sciences/ZHAW.

European Psychologist seeks to integrate across all specializations in psychology and to provide a general platform for communication and cooperation among psychologists throughout Europe and worldwide. Integrative articles and reviews constitute the core material published in the journal. These state-of-the-art papers cover research trends and developments within psychology, with possible reference to European perceptions or fields of specialization. Empirical articles will be considered only in rare circumstances when they present findings from major multinational, multidisciplinary or longitudinal studies, or present results with markedly wide relevance.

== Abstracting and indexing ==
European Psychologist is abstracted and indexed in Current Contents/Social and Behavioral Sciences, Social Sciences Citation Index, PsycINFO, PASCAL, and Scopus. According to the Journal Citation Reports, the journal has a 2016 (two-year) impact factor of 3.419 .

== See also ==
- European Federation of Psychology Students' Associations
- American Psychological Association
