= European Federation of Psychology Students' Associations =

The European Federation of Psychology Students' Associations (EFPSA) is a non-profit and non-governmental student's organization that encompasses psychology student associations from all across Europe. The association currently consists of 33 Member Organizations and two Observer Organizations, each represented by a Member Representative, who collectively form the legislative body of the Federation.

The work of the federation is perpetuated through the work of the Member Representatives (MRS), the Executive Board (EB) and the Board of Management (BM). The EFPSA provides psychology students with diverse opportunities for scientific development and self-development through its Events and Services. Additionally, EFPSA also aims to make a positive impact in society through a variety of campaigns while representing the interest and needs of psychology students on a European context.

== History ==
EFPSA was founded in April 1987 at the University of Lisbon, Portugal where European psychology students from all over Europe had been invited to a meeting. Psychology students from eight European countries formed the European Federation of Psychology Students’ Associations (EFPSA). At this time, the EFPSA initiated its first project, the EUROPSYCHO-Database on education and exchange.

During its third general assembly in April 1989 in Lund, Sweden, the Federation developed its initial structure with the first meeting of the Executive Board (EB) being held for the first time in that same year. In July 1991, the EFPSA started a collaboration with the European Federation of Psychologists' Associations (EFPA) in Amsterdam, the Netherlands, following which EFPSA became an official affiliate member of EFPA in 2001.

== Events ==
EFPSA currently organizes eleven annual and one biennial event: The Congress, European Summer School (ESS), EFPSA Academy, Train the Trainers (TTT) Summer School, Train Advanced Trainers (TAT), Trainers’ Meeting (TRAM), Trainers’ Conference (TRaC), EFPSA Day, the Joint Executive Board & Member Representatives Meeting and Board of Management Meetings are annual events, while the Conference is a biennial event.

=== Journal of European Psychology Students ===
The Journal of European Psychology Students (JEPS) is a double-blind peer-reviewed open access academic journal run entirely by students, covering all aspects of psychology published by the EFPSA and Ubiquity Press since 2009. JEPS provides an opportunity for psychology students to consider their thesis or research with an international scope. Submissions must be based on research conducted by bachelor or master students who may also be from outside Europe. Authors of selected submissions receive professional feedback and help in developing their scientific publication. Articles are selected based on the quality of research alone, disregarding the perceived importance and originality of a particular paper. Articles are indexed in EBSCOHost. Since 2016, JEPS invites students to submit Registered Reports. The JEPS team also run a blog, the JEPS Bulletin, which has been publishing since November 2010 on a range of issues relevant to psychology students of all levels and varied fields of interest.

== Member organizations ==
Organizations from all countries recognized by the Council of Europe can become members of EFPSA. Organizations from countries/regions that are not recognized by the Council of Europe can be taken into consideration as Regional Members. As of April 2018, EFPSA has 33 Member Organizations and two Observer Organizations.

== See also. ==
- European Federation of Psychologists' Associations
- European Psychologist
- American Psychological Association
