= Thérèse Brady =

Irish psychologist

- Born: 1930
- Died: 1999 (aged 68–69)
- Education: University College Dublin
- Scientific career
- Workplaces: University College Dublin

Thérèse Brady (1930– 29 January 1999) was an Irish clinical psychologist. She was a founder of the Psychological Society of Ireland, led postgraduate training at the University College Dublin, and directed the Bereavement Support service of the Irish Hospice Foundation. She was appointed as a fellow of the Foundation in 1988. The Foundation's library is named in her honour, and the School of Psychology at the University College awards a medal in her name.

== Career ==
Brady was born in 1930. She initially intended to study languages and was interested in international affairs, however catching tuberculosis as a teenager set caused her to miss a lot of her schooling. She worked hard to gain admission to University College Dublin, earning an honours degree in French and Spanish, and then continuing in Spanish at postgraduate level, although her master of arts degree was again interrupted by illness.

Brady initially worked as a secretary for a voluntary organisation providing support for people with tuberculosis. She then returned to University College Dublin, studying psychology and graduating in 1966. After graduation she worked at the Mater Hospital Child Guidance Clinic. She then helped to develop the Child Guidance Clinic in Ballymun. She also worked at St Vincent's Psychiatric Hospital.

In 1979, she returned to University College Dublin as director of the postgraduate training programme in clinical psychology. In 1985, she became a director of the Bereavement Support service of the Irish Hospice Foundation, and developed a training programme for volunteers.

She was active in establishing the Psychological Society of Ireland and in 1974 was elected its president.

Brady was a longtime friend of Theodore Alcock, Anna Freud's supervising analyst, and also Donald Broadbent and Jerome Bruner. She was known as a skilful diagnostician, who believed in viewing the whole person rather than focusing on only childhood experiences.

In 1988 the Irish Hospice Foundation appointed Brady a Fellow of the Foundation "for outstanding achievement and contribution to hospice movement".

== Legacy ==
The library at the Irish Hospice Foundation is named the Thérèse Brady Library. It focuses on bereavement, palliative care and end-of-life issues.

The School of Psychology at University College Dublin awards the Therésè Brady Medal to the graduating student in the PhD Clinical Psychology programme whose research thesis is judged to show exceptional clinical sensitivity.

== Publications ==
- Brady, T, Paradoxes in the Pursuit of Psychological Well-Being, Irish Journal of Psychology, 11, 3, 277–298.
