= EuroPsy =

European professional certification

EuroPsy (or European Certificate in Psychology) is a professional qualification, which is setting standards of education, training and competence for psychologists. There is a Basic EuroPsy Certificate that presents a benchmark for independent practice and that can be issued to a psychologist who has demonstrated that they have met these standards.

A EuroPsy Specialist Certificate in Psychotherapy, or a EuroPsy Specialist Certificate in Work and Organisational Psychology can be issued to a psychologist with more advanced education and training, and experience in a field of practice (not in all countries). There is a Register of EuroPsy psychologists with national listings of certificate holders that can be consulted by any person or organisation seeking services of a qualified psychologist.

EuroPsy falls under the auspices of the General Assembly of the European Federation of Psychologists' Associations (EFPA), with a national member association in each of 36 countries in Europe. The regulations governing EuroPsy (EFPA, 2014), approved by the General Assembly, can be found on the EFPA website (www.efpa.eu). A discussion of the various aspects of the EuroPsy system, including its background and history, can be found at the EuroPsy website and in a book by Lunt et al. (2014).

== Principles and standards ==
See Regulations at www.europsy.eu

A major goal of the EuroPsy initiative is to protect members of the public from unqualified providers of services and to promote the availability for every citizen and institution in Europe of competent psychologists.

A EuroPsy Certificate is awarded to an applicant on the basis of: (i) demonstrated completion of a recognized academic education programme in psychology, (ii) demonstrated competence in the performance of professional roles during supervised practice, and (iii) underwriting the EFPA Meta-code of ethics (http://ethics.efpa.eu/meta-code/) and the professional code of ethics in the country of practice. The national code in each country with membership in EFPA entails that sanctions can be imposed when a committee of experts finds that a complaint of professional misconduct brought against a psychologist is justified.

The educational requirements for the Basic EuroPsy Certificate normally include a five-year full-time university curriculum in psychology, consisting of a Bachelors phase (3 years) and a Masters phase (2 years). After completion a further year of supervised semi-independent work is needed within a particular area of professional psychology. Such a year of training can either be part of a university curriculum or arranged through some other institution, such as a work organization. The training should enable the supervisee to develop the competences needed by a psychologist in professional practice. The supervisors assess the trainee’s achievements; the Certificate can only be awarded if the trainee can be expected to perform adequately as a professional psychologist in the area of practice.

The requirements for a Specialist EuroPsy Certificate differ somewhat per area of practice. At least three years of further work experience as well as further study are needed to qualify.

== Continued Professional Development (CPD) ==
EuroPsy Certificates have a limited validity. After a period of seven years the holder of a Certificate has to re-apply showing evidence of continued work experience and of professional development through activities such as, for example, participation in accredited courses and peer supervision meetings, and presentations to professional audiences.

== Administration ==
For the administration of EuroPsy EFPA has established a European EuroPsy Committee (EAC). The EAC delegates the authority to award EuroPsy Certificates to a recognized National EuroPsy Committee (NAC), appointed by the EFPA members association in a country. The EAC works in close cooperation with the EFPA Head Office in Brussel.
