= Louis Stewart (guitarist) =

Irish jazz guitarist (1944–2016)

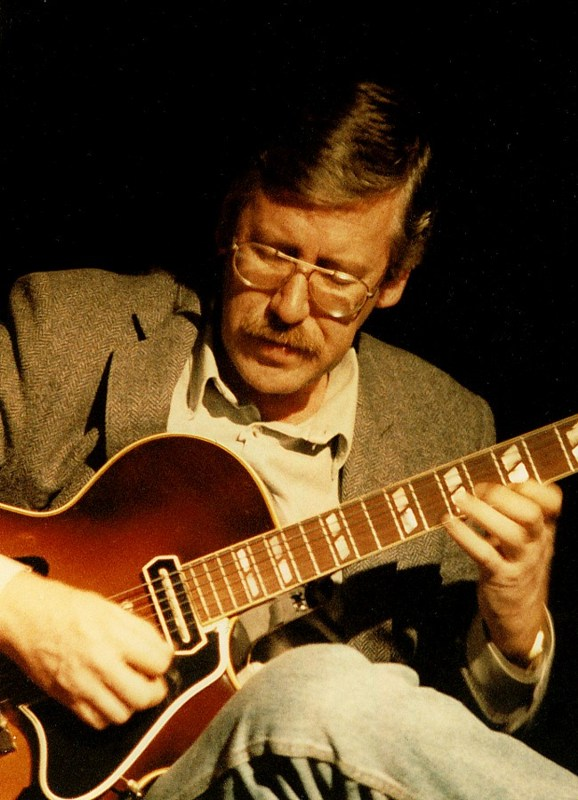

Background information
- Born: 5 January 1944; Waterford, Ireland
- Died: 20 August 2016 (aged 72) Harold's Cross, Dublin, Ireland
- Genres: Jazz
- Occupation: Musician
- Instrument: Guitar
- Years active: 1968–2016

Louis Stewart (5 January 1944 – 20 August 2016) was an Irish jazz guitarist.

== Life and career ==
Born in Waterford, Ireland, Stewart grew up in Dublin. He began playing guitar when he was thirteen, influenced by guitarists Les Paul and Barney Kessel. Stewart began his professional career performing in Dublin showbands. In 1968, he won an award as the most outstanding soloist (on any instrument) at the Montreux Jazz Festival. Soon after, he spent three years touring with Benny Goodman.

Stewart recorded his debut album, Louis the First in Dublin in 1975, and then recorded in London with Billy Higgins, Peter Ind, Sam Jones, Red Mitchell, and Spike Robinson. From the mid to late 1970s, he worked with George Shearing, touring America and Brazil, playing European festivals, and recording eight albums, including several for the MPS label in a virtuosic trio with Shearing and the Danish bassist Niels-Henning Ørsted Pedersen. Stewart also appeared on albums by Joe Williams and J. J. Johnson, and worked with many other jazz greats during his long career.

In 1981, ahead of his debut in the U.S. as a leader, The New York Times stated, "Mr. Stewart seems to have his musical roots in bebop. He leans toward material associated with Charlie Parker and he spins out single-note lines that flow with an unhurried grace, coloured by sudden bright, lively chorded phrases. His up-tempo virtuosity is balanced by a laid-back approach to ballads, which catches the mood of the piece without sacrificing the rhythmic emphasis that keeps it moving."

Stewart was prominently featured in Norman Mongan's 1983 book, The History Of The Guitar In Jazz, in a chapter devoted to guitarists who were considered to be contemporary masters at that time (along with players such as Jim Hall, Pat Martino, and George Benson). In a review of Stewart's live album Overdrive (Hep, 1993), AllMusic stated, "Louis Stewart is one of the all-time greats, and it is obvious from the first notes he plays on any occasion".

Stewart received an honorary doctorate from Trinity College, Dublin, in 1998. In 2009, he was elected to Aosdána, an Irish affiliation of people engaged in literature, music, and visual arts that was established by the Irish Arts Council in 1981 to honour those whose work has made an outstanding contribution to the creative arts in Ireland.

In 2015, Stewart was diagnosed with cancer and died on 20 August 2016 in Harold's Cross, Dublin, at the age of 72.

== Discography ==
=== As leader ===
- Louis the First (Hawk, 1975)
- Baubles, Bangles and Beads with Peter Ind (Wave, 1975)
- Out on His Own (Livia, 1976)
- Some Other Blues with Noel Kelehan (Livia, 1976)
- Milesian Source (Pye, 1977)
- Drums And Friends (Livia, 1978)
- Alone Together with Brian Dunning (Livia, 1979)
- I Thought About You (Livia, 1979)
- Louis Stewart and the Red Lion Trio (Decibelle, France, 1980)
- The Dublin Concert with Jim Hall (Livia, 1982)
- Acoustic Guitar Duets (Super Sessions) with Martin Taylor (Jardis, 1985)
- Good News (Villa, 1986)
- String Time (Villa, 1988/1990)
- Serious Jazz (Livia, 1989)
- Winter Song with Heiner Franz (Jardis, 1990)
- In a Mellow Tone with Heiner Franz (Jardis, 1992)
- Louis Stewart Quartet (feat. Michael Moore) (Cecilia, 1992)
- Joycenotes (Villa, 1993)
- Overdrive (Hep, 1993)
- I Wished On the Moon with Heiner Franz (Jardis, 1999)
- GIFT (w/Bill Charlap) (Ashbrown, 2000)
- Street of Dreams with Heiner Franz (Jardis, 2001)
- Road Song (Villa, 2002?)
- Core Business with Egil Kapstad, Terje Venaas, Eyvind Olsen (Villa, 2004)
- Paradoxal Intervention with Knut Mikalsen (Villa, 2005)
- Angel Eyes w/Peter King (Blau, 2006)
- You've Changed w/Frank Harrison Trio (Desert Island, 2007)
- Tunes w/Jim Doherty (Beechpark, 2013)
- Live in London (Blau, 2016)

=== As sideman ===
With Tubby Hayes (1968–69)

- England's Late Jazz Great (IAJRC, released 1987)
- 200% Proof (Master Mix, released 1992)
- Rumpus Savage (Solweig, released 2015)
- The Syndicate: Live at the Hopbine 1968 Vol.1 (Gearbox, released 2015)
- Grits, Beans and Greens (Fontana, released 2019)

With George Shearing

- Windows (MPS, 1977)
- 500 Miles High (MPS, 1977)
- Getting in the Swing of Things (MPS, 1979)
- On Target (MPS, 1980)
- How Beautiful Is Night (Telarc, 1992)
- That Shearing Sound (Telarc, 1994)
- Paper Moon (Telarc, 1995)

With others

- Agnes Bernelle, Bernelle On Brecht and... (Midnite Music, 1977)
- Cafe Society, Cafe Society (Konk, 1975)
- Mary Coughlan, Long Honeymoon (Evangeline, 2001)
- Laila Dalseth, Daydreams (Hot Club/Gemini, 1984)
- Kevin Dean, Venous Lake (Gemini, 1998)
- Jim Doherty, Spondance (Livia, 1986)
- Yvonne Elliman, Yvonne Elliman (Decca, 1972)
- Benny Goodman, Benny Goodman in Concert (Decca, 1971)
- London Jazz Chamber Group/Ken Moule, Adam's Rib Suite (Ember, 1970)
- J. J. Johnson, Robert Farnon, Tangence (Gitanes, 1994)
- Len McCarthy Len McCarthy & The Guinness Jazz All-Stars (Livia, 1986)
- Maurice Meunier (clarinette), Louis Stewart (guitar), Michel Gaudry (contrebasse), ’’Paris - Dublin'’ (Bloomdido, France, 1986)
- Doug Raney, Heiner Franz, Maarten Van Der Grinten, Frederic Sylvestre, The European Jazz Guitar Orchestra (Jardis, 1993)
- Spike Robinson, Three for the Road (Hep, 1989)
- Spike Robinson, A Real Corker (Capri, 1991)
- Dickie Rock, Just for Old Times Sake (Jewel, 1982)
- Ronnie Scott, Serious Gold (Pye, 1977)
- Clark Terry, At the Montreux Jazz Festival (Polydor, 1970)
- Andrew Lloyd Webber & Tim Rice, Jesus Christ Superstar (MCA, 1970)
- Joe Williams, Here's to Life (Telarc, 1993)

== Sources ==
- Feather/Gitler, Encyclopedia of Jazz, Oxford University Press, 2007, ISBN 978-0195320008
