= Andrew Devane =

Irish architect (1917-2000)

- Born: Andrew Devane; 3 November 1917; Limerick, Ireland
- Died: 15 January 2000 (aged 82); Calcutta
- Education: University College Dublin
- Occupation: Architect
- Practice: Robinson, Keefe & Devane

Andrew Devane (3 November 1917 – 15 January 2000) was an Irish architect, born at 3 Pery Square Limerick. He studied architecture at University College Dublin under Rudolf Maximilian Butler where he graduated in 1941. In 1946 he was awarded the Taliesin Fellowship and he left Ireland for the United States to study under Frank Lloyd Wright until 1948. In 1948 he re-joined Paddy Robinson and Cyril Keefe of the architectural practice of Robinson & Keefe as a partner.

Among his best known works were Stephen Court and the Irish Life Centre in Dublin. Stephen Court was highly recommended in the European Architectural Heritage Year awards for its sympathy with its Georgian surroundings.

== Career ==
After Devane graduated from UCD, he began working in the architecture practice of Robinson & Keefe. After a short time, Devane was offered a partnership with the practice, but decided to postpone any agreement. Around this time Devane made contact with American Architect, Frank Wright Lloyd. In his letter to Wright, Devane said: "I cannot make up my mind whether you are in truth a great architect – or just another phony." to which Wright replied: "Come along and see."

In 1946 Devane travelled to America to attend the Taliesin Fellowship, a private educational institution in which promising architects were given the opportunity to study under Frank Lloyd Wright in Scottsdale, Arizona. Devane grew to admire Wright greatly. In a tribute to Wright, Devane would say of himself and his fellow apprentices that "Each of us lives inevitably (sometimes painfully) in his (Wright’s) "shadow," because in art and architecture, all of us, including him, live and grow or fade and die, in a light that is god-given."

On his return to Ireland in 1948 he took up Paddy Robinson and Cyril Keefe of Robinson & Keefe on their partnership offer and formed the Robinson, Keefe & Devane architecture practice (Now known as RKD Architects).

== Personal life ==
Andrew Devane was born on 3 November 1917 in Limerick to a Roman Catholic family. His father, Dr John Devane, worked in St John's Hospital as a physician from 1915 until his retirement in the 1950s. He was married to Maureen Ashe in 1950 and had three sons, Richard, Martin and Tony. Maureen died in 1977. Later on in life Devane spent much of his time devoted to charity work, especially for Mother Teresa's cause in Calcutta, India.

He died on 15 January 2000 in Calcutta.

== Selected works ==
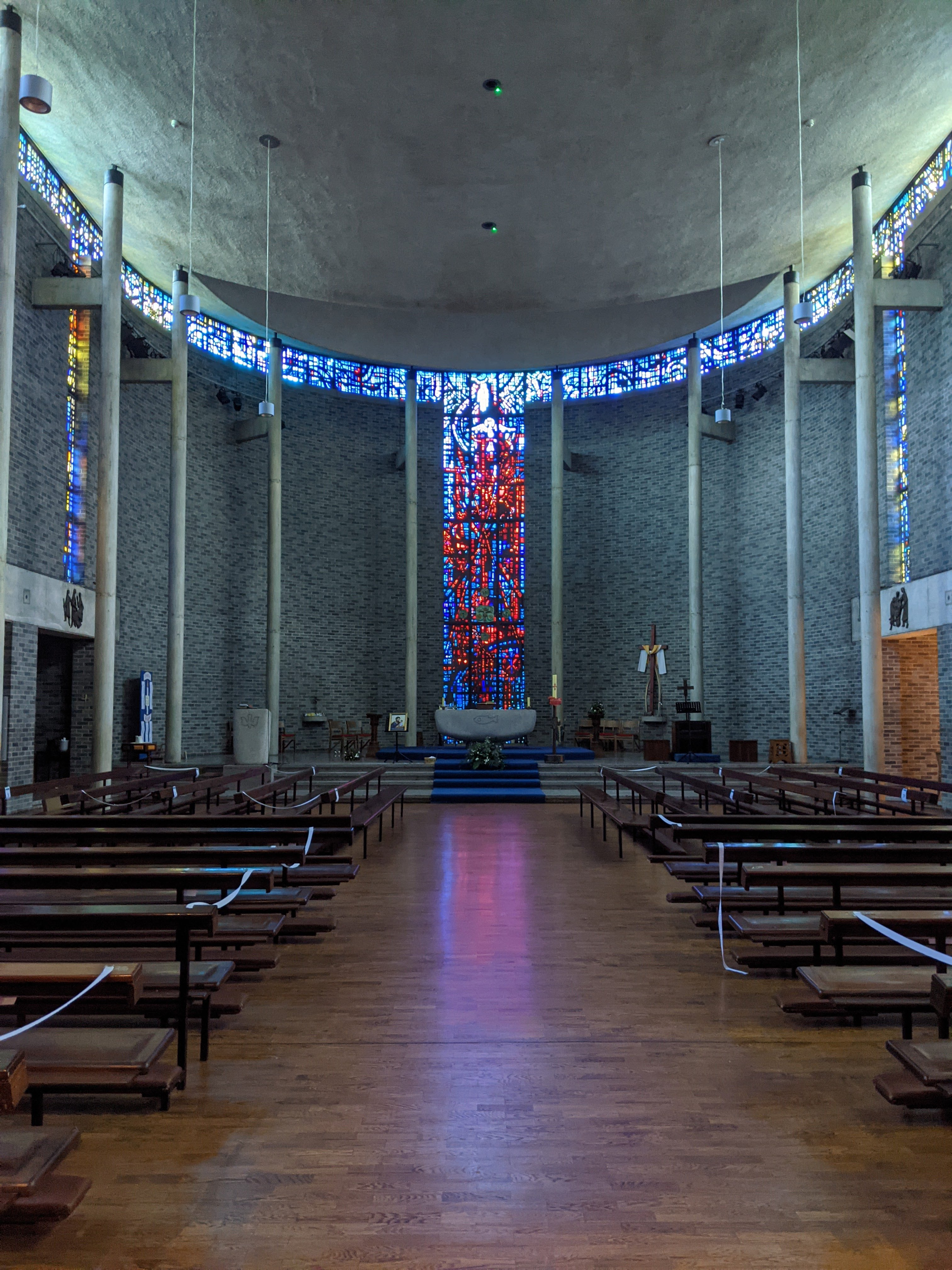
Interior of chapel in St Patrick's College, Drumcondra

- Journey's End, House, Howth, for Devane family. Curvilinear extension to an earlier bungalow.
- St Mary's Girls' School, Bishop Street, King's Island, Limerick.
- St. Patrick's Training College, Drumcondra. Church, gymnasium, dining hall, residential accommodation, library, teaching facilities.
- Urological Unit, Meath Hospital, Dublin.
- Stephen Court, Dublin for Irish life.
- A.I.B. Bankcentre, Ballsbridge, Dublin. Office complex and computer centre.
- Irish Life Centre, Lower Abbey Street. Includes swimming pool, theatre, and second floor gardens, with later extension onto Talbot Street.
- St. Lelia's Church at Killeely Road, Ballynantybeg, Limerick.
- St. Fintan's Church, atrium, campanile, parish centre, and parochial house, Sutton, County Dublin.
- Irish Pavilion, New York Worlds Fair. Temporary building demolished.
