= Michael Nolan (psychologist) =

Irish psychologist (1925–2009)

- Born: Michael Nolan; 30 November 1925; Birmingham, England
- Died: 14 December 2009 (aged 84); Dublin, Ireland
- Education: Pontifical Irish College; University of Cambridge
- Scientific career
- Workplaces: University College Dublin

Michael Nolan (30 November 1925 – 14 December 2009) was an Irish Catholic priest and psychologist.

== Early training as priest ==
John Robert Michael Nolan was born in Birmingham in 1925. He attended St. Vincent's C.B.S. school in Dublin and then transferred to the Holy Cross College (Dublin) (1944–1947) to train for the priesthood. He completed his studies in the Pontifical Irish College and was ordained as a priest in the Archbasilica of Saint John Lateran, Rome by Cardinal Clemente Micara on 10 March 1951. His first appointment was as Chaplain to the Sacred Heart Convent, Mount Anville (1951–52). He returned to St. Vincent's C.B.S. school for a short period before being appointed Assistant Priest to Coolock (1952–1954). From 1954 – 1956 he undertook further studies in the Teutonic College, Rome. He was an advisor to the Archbishop of Dublin and also the exorcist for the diocese. On his retirement in 1990, he was conferred with the title Monsignor.

== Work as a psychologist ==
In 1956, on his return to Ireland he was appointed lecturer in University College Dublin (1956–1957) before going to the University of Cambridge (1957–1959) from which he obtained First Class degree in Psychology. He returned to teaching at University College Dublin. From 1976 to 1980 he was President of the Mater Dei Institute of Education.

In 1984, he was appointed Professor of Logic and Psychology at University College Dublin, succeeding Eamonn O’Doherty. He retired in 1990 and was succeeded by Noel Sheehy.

Nolan was a founding member of the Psychological Society of Ireland which was established in 1970. He was elected President of the Society in 1973.

After his retirement he was Honorary Secretary of the UCD Retired Staff Association: Maurice Kennedy Research Centre.

He died 14 December 2009.

== Heritage ==
The School of Psychology at University College Dublin annually awards the Michael Nolan Medal for best final year project submitted by a student in the BSc Psychology programme.

== Some publications ==
- Nolan, M. (1993). Church, State and Theology in the European Community.
- Nolan, M. (1997). The myth of soulless women. First Things
- Nolan, M. (1998). What Aquinas never said about women. First Things.
- Nolan, M. (2006). Do women have souls?
