= European Review =

Journal of contemporary European issues

- Discipline: Humanities, Social Sciences, Exact Sciences, Applied Sciences, Life Sciences
- Language: English
- Edited by: Alban Kellerbauer

Publication details
- History: 1993-present
- Publisher: Cambridge University Press
- Frequency: bimonthly

Standard abbreviations
- ISO 4: Eur. Rev.

Indexing
- ISSN: 1062-7987 (print); 1474-0575 (web)

Links
- Journal homepage

The European Review is a peer-reviewed academic journal covering contemporary issues in Europe. It covers a broad range of fields, including the humanities, social sciences, exact sciences, applied sciences, and life sciences.

The journal is sponsored by the Academia Europaea and published by Cambridge University Press. It was initially published by John Wiley & Sons.

== Abstracting and indexing ==
The journal is abstracted and indexed in the British Humanities Index, Scopus, EBSCOhost, and Applied Social Sciences Index and Abstracts.
