= Martin McHugh (psychologist) =

Irish psychologist (died 2016)

- Born: 1940; Kilkeel, Ireland
- Died: 17 February 2016; Belfast, Ireland
- Education: Queen's University Belfast
- Scientific career
- Workplaces: National University of Ireland, Galway

Martin McHugh was an Irish psychologist.

Martin McHugh was born in Kilkeel. He was one of the first graduates in psychology from Queen's University Belfast.

In 1971, he was appointed the first Professor of Psychology at the National University of Ireland, Galway.

McHugh was a founding member of the Psychological Society of Ireland which was established in 1970. He was elected the inaugural President of the Society in 1973.

He was the first editor of the Irish Journal of Psychology.

He died 17 February 2016.

== Publications ==
- McHugh, M.F. (2007). The Irish Journal of Psychology: A retrospection. The Irish Journal of Psychology, 28:3-4, 97–100.
- Lynn, R., Mylotte, A., Ford, F., & McHugh, M. (1997). The heritability of intelligence and social maturity in four to six year olds: A study of Irish twins. The Irish Journal of Psychology, 18 (4), 439–443.
- O’Mara, S.M, & McHugh, M.F. (1991). The Effects of Proactive Interference Manipulations and Instructed CS Reversal on Conditioned Motor Responses in Human Subjects. The Irish Journal of Psychology, 12:1, 49–59.
