= The Journal of Positive Psychology =

- Discipline: Positive psychology
- Language: English
- Edited by: Robert A. Emmons

Publication details
- History: 2006-present
- Publisher: Routledge
- Frequency: Bimonthly
- Impact factor: 4.197 (2020)

Standard abbreviations
- ISO 4: J. Posit. Psychol.

Indexing
- ISSN: 1743-9760 (print); 1743-9779 (web)
- OCLC no.: 64069779

Links
- Journal homepage; Online access; Online archive

The Journal of Positive Psychology is a bimonthly peer-reviewed academic journal covering positive psychology, including measures of well-being such as life satisfaction, traits such as optimism, work life consequences of resilience, and methods to enhance positive psychological traits. It was established in 2006 and is published by Routledge. The editor-in-chief is Robert A. Emmons (University of California, Davis).

== Abstracting and indexing ==
The journal is abstracted and indexed in CINAHL, Current Contents/Social & Behavioral Sciences, PsycINFO, Scopus, and the Social Sciences Citation Index. According to the Journal Citation Reports, the journal has a 2020 impact factor of 4.197.
