= Contemporary Family Therapy =

- Discipline: Health psychology, behavioral medicine
- Language: English
- Edited by: Rachel R. Tambling

Publication details
- History: 1979–present
- Publisher: Springer Science+Business Media
- Frequency: Quarterly

Standard abbreviations
- ISO 4: Contemp. Fam. Ther.

Indexing
- CODEN: CFTHE9
- ISSN: 0892-2764 (print); 1573-3335 (web)
- LCCN: 98642047
- OCLC no.: 13511530

Links
- Journal homepage; Online access

Contemporary Family Therapy is a peer-reviewed academic journal covering research on family therapy, focusing on recent applied practice and developments in theory and research that is published quarterly by Springer Science+Business Media. The editor-in-chief is Rachel R. Tambling (University of Connecticut). Contemporary Family Therapy (COFT) presents the latest developments in research, practice, theory, and training in couple and family therapy. COFT publishes applied and basic research with implications for systemic theory, treatment, and policy. COFT appreciates a multidisciplinary approach, and welcomes manuscripts which address processes and outcomes in systemic treatment across modalities and within broader social contexts. The journal's content is relevant to systemic therapy practitioners and researchers, as well as marriage and family therapists, family psychologists, clinical social workers, and social policy specialists. It was established in 1986.

== Abstracting and indexing ==
Contemporary Family Therapy is abstracted and indexed in Scopus and PsycINFO.
