= David O'Doherty =

Irish comedian

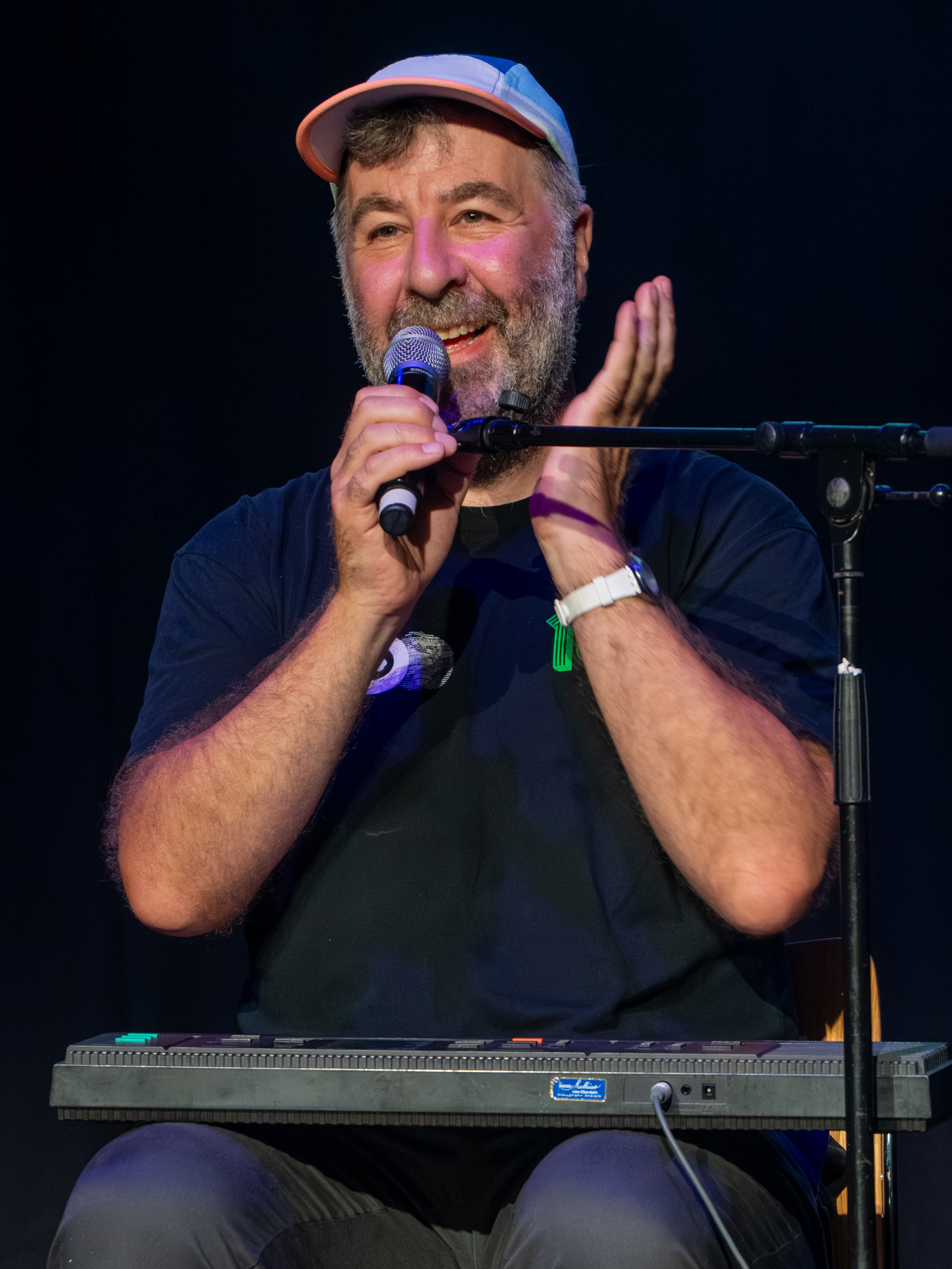
- O'Doherty at the 2025 Edinburgh Festival Fringe
- Born: David Nicholas Doherty; 18 December 1975 (age 50); Dublin, Ireland
- Education: Trinity College Dublin

Comedy career
- Years active: 1999–present
- Medium: Stand up, television
- Genres: Musical comedy, Surreal humour
- Website: davidodoherty.com

David Nicholas O'Doherty (/oʊˈdɒhərti/ or /oʊˈdɒkərti/; born 18 December 1975) is an Irish comedian, author, musician, actor and playwright and son of renowned jazz pianist Jim Doherty. His stand-up has won many international awards, including the if.comedy award in 2008 and Best International Comedian at the 2014 Sydney Comedy Festival.

O'Doherty has written several books, written two plays and released three comedy CDs. His book for children, Danger Is Everywhere, illustrated by Chris Judge was selected for the UNESCO Dublin, City of Literature Citywide Reading Campaign and was published in 10 languages around the world. His book The Summer I Robbed A Bank won the 2021 Irish Children's Book of the Year Award.

O'Doherty regards himself as "a failed jazz musician, scrambling about for something else to do with his life".

== Early life ==
O'Doherty's father is pianist Jim Doherty. His grandfather was Kevin O'Doherty, an Irish hurdles champion, and his great-grandfather was Séamus O'Doherty, a head of the Irish Republican Brotherhood. He is the youngest of three children and has an older brother and sister who are seven and eight years older than him, respectively.

O'Doherty studied philosophy at Trinity College Dublin, where he was a member of the Jazz Society and a fake Breakdancing Society. It's also where his comedy career began. "I spent a lot of my time introducing things", he says, "concerts and bands, that sort of thing". "I remember my brother once bet me I couldn't get the word 'spaghetti' into an introduction for a piano recital in the Edmund Burke so I stood up and said 'my brother has bet me I can't say the word spaghetti' and I got a laugh."

== Comedic career ==
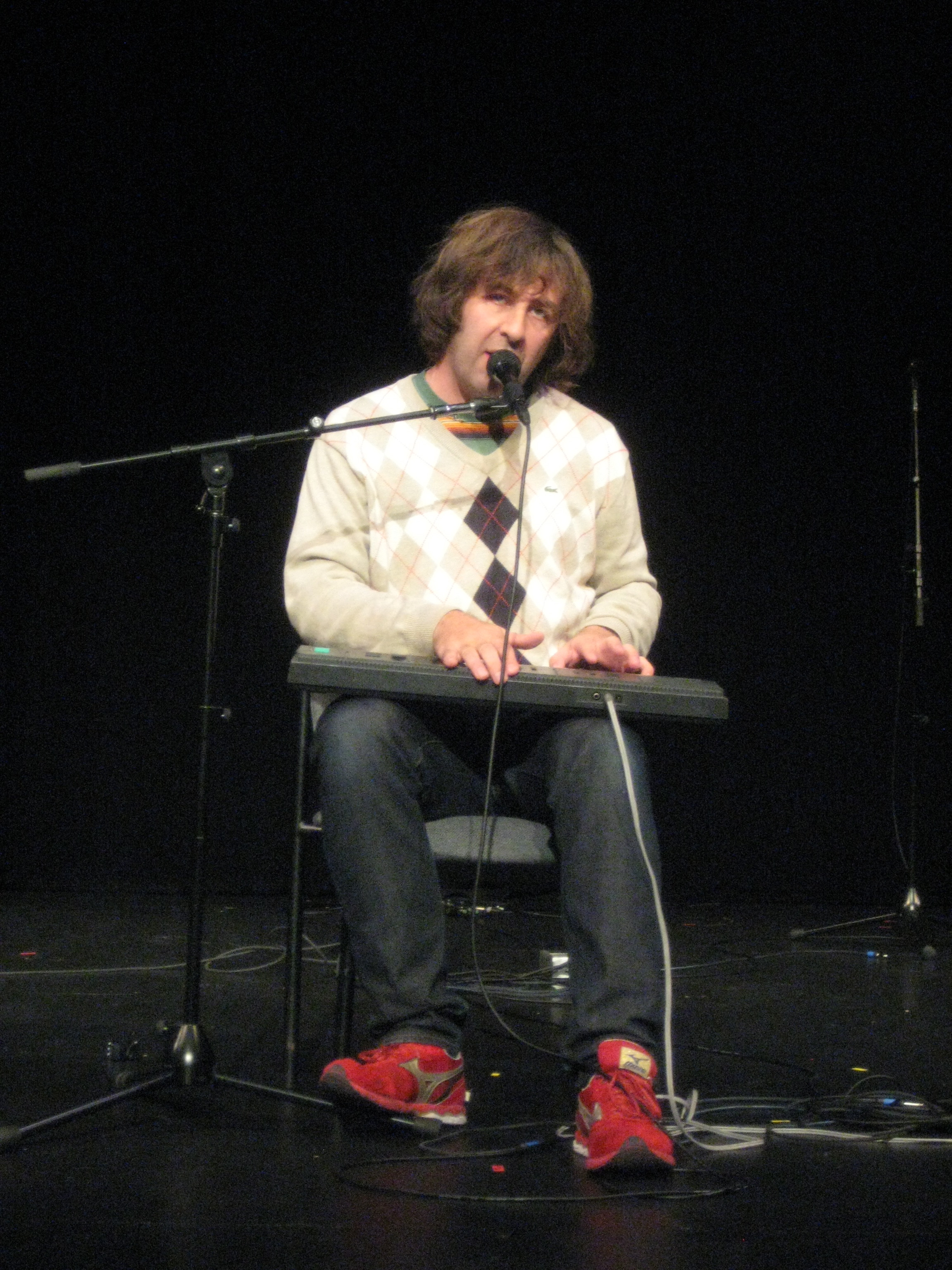
O'Doherty in 2009

O'Doherty worked in a bicycle shop and in telemarketing and temping before he made his first stage appearance at Dublin's Comedy Cellar in 1998. His first full show was The Story of the Boy Who Saved Comedy which received a nomination for Perrier Best Newcomer when it was performed at Edinburgh Fringe. In 2006, he was nominated for an if.comedy award for his Edinburgh show, David O'Doherty Is My Name. O'Doherty has performed at festivals across the world in locations that include Adelaide, Melbourne, Montreal, New York City and Wellington NZ, Moscow and Iceland. As a support act he first toured Ireland with Tommy Tiernan, the United Kingdom with Rich Hall and the United States with Demetri Martin.

In August 2008, O'Doherty won the If.comedy award at the Edinburgh Fringe for his show Let's Comedy, which featured "a relationship in text messages, tunes played on a 3ft electronic keyboard, and a badger attack". He was presented with the 2008 Intelligent Finance Comedy Award and a cheque for £8,000 (€10,000) by the previous winner Brendon Burns and the Australian author and television presenter Clive James.

Since September 2024, O'Doherty has been hosting the comedy podcast What Did You Do Yesterday? together with Max Rushden. Each week a new guest, usually a comedian, is interviewed about their respective yesterdays.

== Television career ==
In June 2012 he became the first Irish comedian to have their own Comedy Central Presents episode on American television.

In May 2007, O'Doherty's first TV series, The Modest Adventures of David O'Doherty, began airing on RTÉ Two. The six-part series was directed by John Carney, following the completion of his Academy Award-winning film Once.

The Modest Adventures of David O'Doherty episodes
No.	Title
1	"Galway"
David attempts to cycle from Dublin to Galway, for a show later that night. He quits 100 kilometres from his destination.
2	"27"
David attempts to have "a minor hit", preferably charting at number 27. His song "Orange" instead reaches number 30, losing the number 27 spot in the Irish Singles Chart to Jibbs's "Chain Hang Low".
3	"Job"
David tries to make his rent. A number of strategies are employed for this end; these include: betting money on a game of golf he plays with his nephew (and losing); betting money at a dog track (and losing); attempting to sell an office chair he found in a skip (and eventually making €1.70 on the sale); trying to find a job where he states in an interview that he can touch-type at around 40 words per minute. He turned down a telemarketing placement; and eventually acting as an assistant to his neighbour Bryan, whose work involved erecting signs about planning permission, leading to a string of jokes concerning erections. He eventually earned the €260 through the latter.
4	"Tour"
David does a stand-up tour which he has t-shirts printed for. One show is for children. He does a gig at Vicar Street (a 1200 seater venue), but due to it being cancelled and re-instated repeatedly only about 20 people attend. The t-shirts do not arrive until after the tour has finished and are too small.
5	"Movie"
David tries to make a short film. The film is to be about Ernest Shackleton's reasons for trekking to the Antarctic and heavily features penguins. He sneaks his crew into Dublin Zoo dressed in clothes of an 1800s style. Due to too many people walking into frame, he opts to acquire a penguin elsewhere in Dublin. This proves to be a difficult task with O'Doherty eventually buying an inflatable penguin on eBay for €35. The inflatable is blown away by the wind. O'Doherty subsequently dresses up to play the part of the penguin. The film premieres in a local pub during the half-time of a football match on TV. The film's plotline goes as follows: Shackleton's blocks are knocked over by bullies, one of whom has a picture of a penguin on his shirt. His girlfriend breaks up with him at the penguin enclosure at the zoo. The penguins seem to mock him. His parents choke on Penguin chocolate biscuits. He goes to the Antarctic. He shoots a penguin. There is no applause for his film, however there is a cheer when the match is put back on. This episode is dedicated to O'Doherty's friend's pet kitten, Tony, who appeared in the episode and died in 2007.
6	"Live"
David attempts to record a comedy CD. The CD is recorded in his one-room apartment. He then advertises the gig on A4-sized posters, asking to be contacted via e-mail if anyone is interested in coming to the show. Upwards of 30 chairs are squeezed into the apartment.

In May 2026, O'Doherty starred in The Way Out on U&Dave, a comedy series based on a Belgian TV format where comedians compete in a series of escape room challenges. Hosted by Mel Giedroyc, his co-stars and teammates are Nish Kumar and Amy Annette, along with Ed Gamble, Chloe Petts, and Lou Sanders on the opposing team.

== Literary career ==
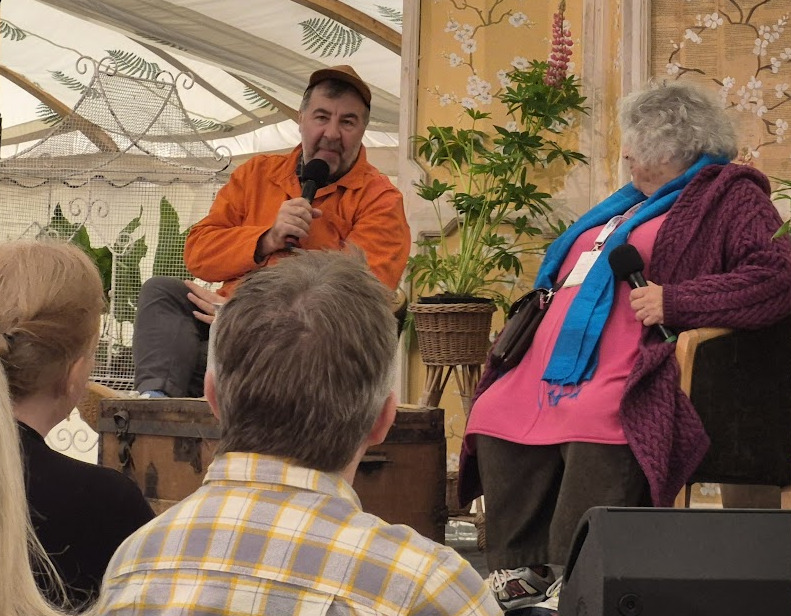
David O'Doherty at the Borris House Festival of Writing and Ideas 2026 with Miriam Margolyes

O'Doherty has written widely for newspapers and magazines and also has two plays, several books and a radio series to his name. His debut book was a children's book entitled Ronan Long Gets It Wrong, written in 2000. It was illustrated by David Roberts and published by Mammoth Storybooks. His first play is entitled Saddled and was written with Bryan Quinn. It was claimed as "the world's first theatrical production to feature live repair of audience members' bicycles". In 2008, he and fellow Irish comedian Maeve Higgins performed I Can't Sleep, a play recommended for children aged 5–8. This was O'Doherty's first play for children. The play, which involved the audience entering the theatre to find both performers asleep in separate beds, was performed in both Dublin and Edinburgh.

He has also written a series for RTÉ Radio about bee detectives with his brother Mark, entitled The Bees of Manulla. O'Doherty released a book detailing 100 false facts about pandas called 100 Facts About Pandas. He followed this up with 100 Facts About Sharks which is 100 false facts about sharks. In 2014 he and illustrator, Chris Judge, released a children's book, Danger Is Everywhere: A Handbook for Avoiding Danger.

His book The Summer I Robbed A Bank won the 2021 Irish Children's Book of the Year Award.

== Personal life ==
O'Doherty is an avid cyclist and owns, as of 2025, 18 bicycles. He has also stated publicly that he has never once eaten a turnip, and anyone who states otherwise will face legal ramifications. O'Doherty is a supporter of Tottenham Hotspur.

== Filmography ==
In 2008, O'Doherty starred alongside comedian Dylan Moran, Keith Allen and Neil Jordan in A Film with Me in It, a cinematic release written by and starring his brother Mark Doherty.

=== Edinburgh Fringe shows ===
Year	Title
2000	David O'Doherty: The Boy Who Saved Comedy
2002	David O'Doherty: Small Things
2003	David O'Doherty Creates Something New Under The Sun
2004	David O'Doherty in World Champion of Some Things
2005	David O'Doherty: Grown Up
2006	David O'Doherty Is My Name
2007	It's David O'Doherty Time
2008	David O'Doherty: Let's Comedy
2009	David O'Doherty: David O' Doh-party
2010	David O'Doherty: Somewhere Over The David O'Doherty
2011	David O'Doherty Is Looking Up
2011	David O'Doherty presents: Rory Sheridan's Tales of the Antarctica
2012	Seize the David O'Doherty (Carpe D'O'Diem)
2013	David O'Doherty Will Try to Fix Everything
2014	David O'Doherty Has Checked Everything
2015	David O'Doherty: We Are All in the Gutter, But Some of Us Are Looking at David O'Doherty
2016	David O'Doherty: Big Time
2017	David O'Doherty: Big Time
2018	David O'Doherty: You Have To Laugh
2019	David O'Doherty: Ultrasound
2022	David O'Doherty: whoa, is me
2023	David O'Doherty: Tiny Piano Man
2024	David O'Doherty: Ready, Steady, David O'Doherty
2025	David O'Doherty: Highway to the David Zone

=== Awards and nominations for stand-up comedy ===
O'Doherty has been decorated with numerous awards for his achievements in comedy. In 1999, he won the Channel 4 So You Think You're Funny Comedy Competition at the Edinburgh Fringe and was also a finalist in the BBC New Comedy Awards in the same year. He eventually won the if.comedy Award (formerly the Perrier Award) in 2008 for Let's Comedy. He was also nominated for the Barry Award at the Melbourne International Comedy Festival in 2006 and in 2014 received the award for Best International Comedian at the Sydney Comedy Festival.

Year	Nominee / work	Award	Result
1999	Edinburgh Fringe	Channel 4 So You Think You're Funny Comedy Competition winner	Won
1999		BBC New Comedy Awards	2nd
2000		Perrier Best Newcomer Award	Nominated
2003		Hot Press Irish Comedian of the Year	Won
2006	David O'Doherty is My Name	If.comedy award	Nominated
2006	David O'Doherty is My Name	Barry Award at the Melbourne International Comedy Festival	Nominated
2008	Let's Comedy	If.comedy award	Won
2014	David O’Doherty Will Try To Fix Everything	Best International Comedian Sydney Comedy Festival Awards	Won

== Discography ==
O'Doherty has also released five live audio albums, Giggle Me Timbers (or Jokes Ahoy!), recorded in front of 35 people in his studio apartment and Let's David O'Doherty (2009), We Are Not The Champions (2012) and You Only Live (2015) recorded at Whelan's in Dublin.

Year	Title	Peak chart position
2007	"Orange"	(Republic of Ireland) No. 30
2009	Let's David O'Doherty	(Republic of Ireland)
2012	We Are Not The Champions	(Republic of Ireland)
2015	You Only Live	(Republic of Ireland)
2020	Live In His Own Car During A Pandemic	(Republic of Ireland)
