= David Magnusson =

Swedish psychologist (1925–2017)

David Natanael Magnusson (1925 in Nässjö, Sweden – 2017 in Lidingö, Sweden) was a Swedish psychologist. He was professor in psychology at Stockholm University from 1969 to 1992.

David Magnusson is known for several theoretical, methodological and empirical contributions to psychological science. Theoretically, he developed an approach to psychological research called holistic interactionism. The basic assumption is that each person is seen holistically, with multiple systems that interact with the environment in various unique ways. Methodologically, this means that developmental processes are idiosyncratic. He therefore argued for a person-oriented approach as an alternative, or at least as a complement, to the traditional variable-oriented approach in psychological research.

Magnusson is also known for his longitudinal study Individual Development and Adaptation (IDA), which he started in the 1960s and led until 1996. This research program targeted two whole cohorts of school children in Örebro, Sweden. These individuals were then followed through more than 20 data collections over more than 50 years. After Magnusson's retirement, the IDA program was led by professor Lars R. Bergman, Stockholm University, and after Bergman's retirement by professors Henrik Andershed and Anna-Karin Andershed at Örebro University. The IDA program has led to more than 500 scientific publications.
