= Psychological Society of Ireland =

Learned and professional body

Psychological Society of Ireland Cumann Síceolaithe Éireann
- Abbreviation: PSI
- Formation: 1970; 56 years ago
- Type: Professional body, learned society, charity
- Legal status: Non-profit company
- Headquarters: Grantham House, Grantham Road, Dublin, D08 W8HD
- Members: 4,000 approx.
- President: Odhrán McCarthy
- Chief Executive Officer: Sheena Horgan
- Website: www.psychologicalsociety.ie

The Psychological Society of Ireland (Irish: Cumann Síceolaithe Éireann) (PSI) is the learned and professional body for psychology and psychologists in the Republic of Ireland.

== History ==
The Society was established in 1970 by a group of seventeen people. This was preceded by consultation and planning that led to the establishment of a single body to represent psychologists throughout Ireland. It has since grown to about 4,000 people.

== Divisions and groups ==
The Society has ten Divisions which represent the interests of members in the key academic/professional disciplines. These are:

- Academics, Teachers and Researchers in Psychology
- Behaviour Analysis
- Clinical Psychology
- Counselling Psychology
- Forensic Psychology
- Health Psychology
- Neuropsychology
- Psychotherapy
- Sport, Exercise and Performance Psychology
- Work and Organisational Psychology

It also has eight Special Interest Groups to represent more specialised interests. These are:

- Addiction
- Autistic Spectrum Disorders
- Coaching Psychology
- Eating Disorders
- Intellectual Disabilities
- Media, the Arts and Cyberpsychology
- Paediatric Psychology
- Perinatal and Infant Mental Health

== Publications ==
- Irish Journal of Psychology
- The Irish Psychologist

== Awards ==
The Society makes the following awards each year:

- Early Career Psychologists;
- Award for contribution to Research in Psychology;
- Award for contribution to Professional Practice Psychology.

== Presidents ==
The following have been Presidents of the Society:

- 1970/71 Martin McHugh
- 1971/72 James McLoone
- 1972/73 Rod Power
- 1973/74 Michael Nolan
- 1974/75 Thérèse Brady
- 1975/76 Páid McGee
- 1976/77 Torlach O’Connor
- 1977/78 Ray Fuller
- 1978/79 Brian Kinch
- 1979/80 David Kenefick
- 1980/81 Stephen Kealy
- 1981/82 Tony Gorman
- 1982/83 Howard Smith
- 1983/84 Roy McConkey
- 1984/85 Anne O’Connell
- 1985/86 Margaret McGinley
- 1986/87 Mitchel Fleming
- 1987/88 Dympna Walsh
- 1988/89 Stuart Lewis
- 1989/90 Brendan Broderick
- 1990/91 Carol McGuinness
- 1991/92 Hannah McGee
- 1992/93 Anne Halliday
- 1993/94 Paul Gilligan
- 1994/95 Eunice McCarthy
- 1995/96 Kevin Tierney
- 1996/97 Pauline Beegan
- 1997/98 Joan Tiernan
- 1998/99 Isolde Blau
- 1999/00 Grainne Ni Dhomhnaill
- 2000/01 Roger Woodward
- 2001/02 Desmond Swan
- 2002/03 James Connolly
- 2003/04 Joe MacDonagh
- 2004/05 Brian Hughes
- 2005/06 Ronan Yore
- 2006/07 Suzanne Guerin
- 2007/08 Mitchel Fleming
- 2008/09 Rosaleen McElvaney
- 2009/10 Niall Pender
- 2010/11 Mary Morrissey
- 2011/12 Michael Drumm
- 2012/13 Eric Brady
- 2013/14 Margaret O’Rourke
- 2014/15 Paul D’Alton
- 2016 Anne Davis
- 2017 Michele Coyle
- 2018 Brendan O'Connell
- 2019 Ian O'Grady
- 2020 Mark Smyth
- 2021 Megan Gaffney
- 2022 Vincent McDarby
- 2023 Anne Kehoe
- 2024 Odhrán McCarthy

== External collaborations ==
The PSI has established memoranda of understanding with several other psychological organisations including the American Psychological Association and the British Psychological Society.
