= Niels Birbaumer =

Austrian academic

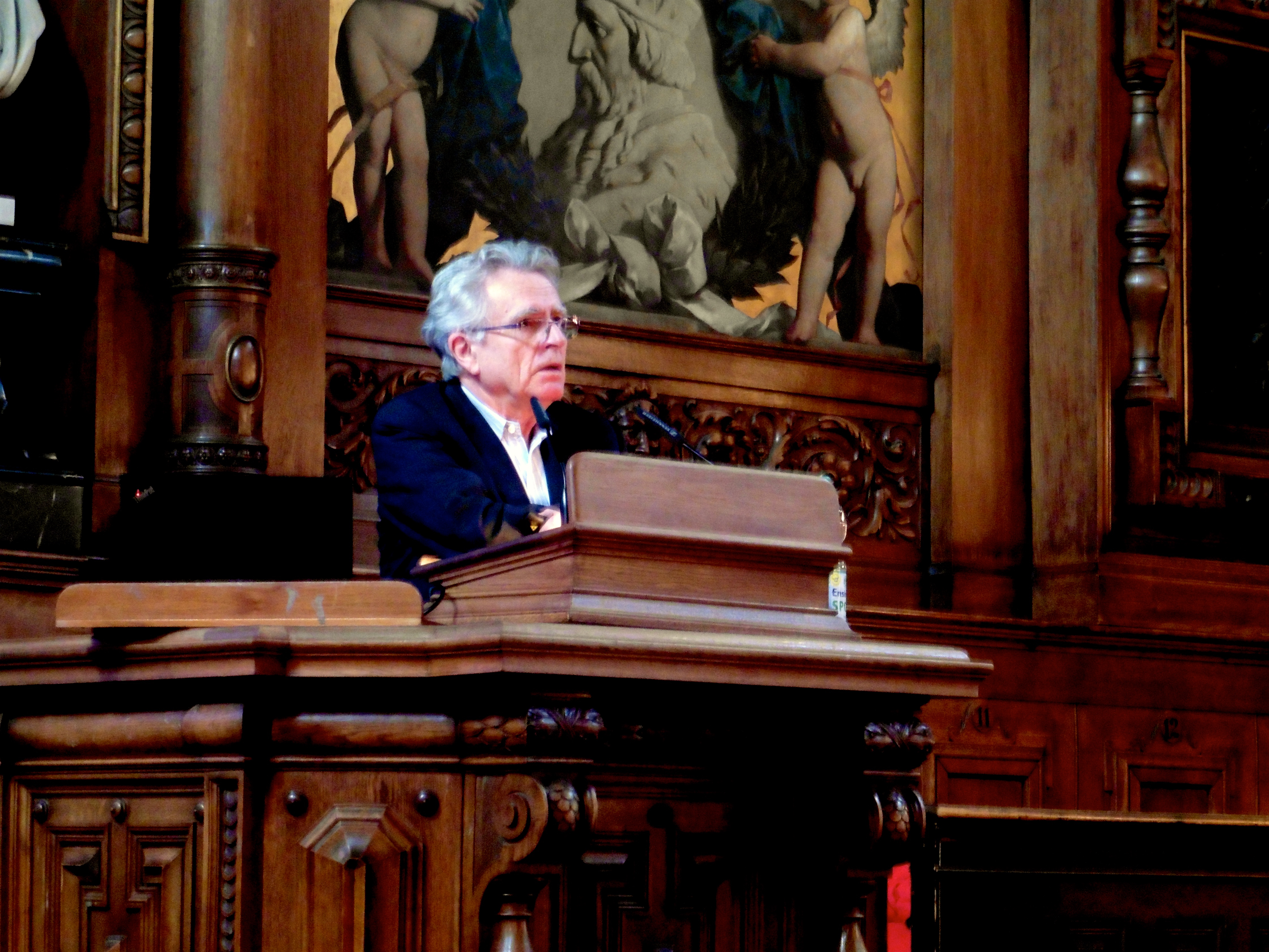
Niels Bierbaumer in 2017

Niels Birbaumer (born 11 May 1945) is an Austrian academic who served as a professor at the University of Tübingen until 2019.

== Research career ==
In 2017, Birbaumer's study claimed that a brain-computer interface (BCI) device, applied via an electrode cap, enabled four ALS patients to communicate binary responses. This drew considerable attention due to its implications for quality of life. However, the study's replicability was questioned, leading to a German Research Foundation (DFG) investigation, which found the research data incomplete and the results flawed. As a result, Birbaumer's work was retracted, his funding revoked, and he was dismissed from the university. He relocated to Italy.

Despite the controversy, Birbaumer and his colleague Chaudhary received public support from several scientists. Notably, the BCI technology, which was first demonstrated successfully in a tetraplegic patient in 2006, was applied in Birbaumer's research to a patient without any voluntary muscle control for the first time.

The BCI was implanted in 2019 into the brain of a 34-year-old man with locked-in syndrome. After several trials, researchers decoded "yes" or "no" signals into sentences. The study, which spanned 462 days, was meticulously documented. Seward Rutkove, Chair of Neurology at Beth Israel Deaconess Medical Center, affirmed the BCI's efficacy but questioned its practicality due to cost and limited applicability.

In March 2022, Birbaumer published a new study in Nature Communications that builds on his prior work. Birbaumer and Chaudhary also claimed to have won lawsuits supporting the integrity of their PLOS report, showcasing the use of a BCI in a patient devoid of voluntary muscle control.

In April 2022, DFG and Birbaumer settled the legal dispute.

== Selected publications ==
- Birbaumer, N.; Ghanayim, N.; Hinterberger, T.; Iversen, I.; Kotchoubey, B.; Kübler, A.; Perelmouter, J.; Taub, E.; Flor, H. (1999). "A spelling device for the paralysed". Nature. 398 (6725): 297–298. Bibcode:1999Natur.398..297B. doi:10.1038/18581. PMID 10192330.
- Birbaumer, Niels; Schmidt, Robert F. (2010). Biologische Psychologie (7 ed.). Berlin, Heidelberg: Springer. ISBN 978-3-662-58025-7.
- Chaudhary, Ujwal; Birbaumer, Niels; Ramos-Murguialday, Ander (2016). "Brain–computer interfaces for communication and rehabilitation". Nature Reviews Neurology. 12 (9): 513–525. doi:10.1038/nrneurol.2016.113. PMID 27539560.
- Sitaram, Ranganatha; Ros, Tomas; Stoeckel, Luke; Haller, Sven; Scharnowski, Frank; Lewis-Peacock, Jarrod; Weiskopf, Nikolaus; Blefari, Maria Laura; Rana, Mohit; Oblak, Ethan; Birbaumer, Niels; Sulzer, James (2017). "Closed-loop brain training: the science of neurofeedback". Nature Reviews Neuroscience. 18 (2): 86–100. doi:10.1038/nrn.2016.164. PMID 28003656.
- Birbaumer, Niels; Zittlau, Jörg (2017). Your brain knows more than you think: the new frontiers of neuroplasticity. Melbourne; London: SCRIBE. ISBN 978-1-925322-36-1.
- Birbaumer, Niels; Zittlau, Jörg (2019). Empty brain happy brain: how thinking is overrated. Scribe. ISBN 978-1-911344-58-2.
- The Mind Reader. A life in science. Lulu Press. 2025. ISBN 978-1-300-65556-5.
