= German Plot (Ireland) =

1918 conspiracy in Ireland

The "German Plot" was a spurious conspiracy that the Dublin Castle administration in Ireland claimed existed between the Sinn Féin movement and the German Empire in May 1918. Allegedly, the two factions conspired to start an armed insurrection in Ireland during World War I, which would have diverted the British war effort. The administration used these claims to justify the internment of Sinn Féin leaders, who were actively opposing attempts to introduce conscription in Ireland.

== History ==
The "plot" originated on 12 April when the British arrested Joseph Dowling after he was put ashore in County Clare by a German U-boat. Dowling had been a member of the Irish Brigade, one of several schemes by Roger Casement to get German assistance for the 1916 Easter Rising. Dowling now claimed that the Germans were planning a military expedition to Ireland. William Reginald Hall and Basil Thomson believed him and convinced the authorities to intern all Sinn Féin leaders. 150 were arrested on the night of 17–18 May and taken to prisons in England. The introduction of internment and conscription reflected a decision of the British cabinet to take a harder line on the Irish Question following the failure of the Irish Convention.

Paul McMahon characterises the "Plot" as "a striking illustration of the apparent manipulation of intelligence in order to prod the Irish authorities into more forceful action". Republicans were tipped off about the impending arrests, allowing some to escape capture while others chose to be taken in order to secure a propaganda victory. The internment was counterproductive for the British, imprisoning the more accommodating Sinn Féin leadership while failing to capture members of the Irish Republican Brotherhood more committed to physical force republicanism. This allowed Michael Collins to consolidate his control of the organisation and put it on a more focused military footing.

Even at the time, the proposition that the Sinn Féin leadership were directly planning with the German authorities to open another military front in Ireland was largely seen as spurious. Irish nationalists generally view the "German Plot" not as an intelligence failure but as a black propaganda project to discredit the Sinn Féin movement, particularly to an uninformed public in the United States. Historian Paul McMahon comments that this belief is mistaken, and that the authorities acted honestly but on the basis of faulty intelligence. It is still a matter of study and conjecture what impact it had on US foreign policy regarding the 1919 bid for international recognition of the Irish Republic.

== See also ==
- Conscription Crisis of 1918
- 1918 United Kingdom general election in Ireland
- Irish War of Independence (1919–21)
- Irish Republican Army – Abwehr collaboration in World War II
