= Friendship =

Mutual affection between people

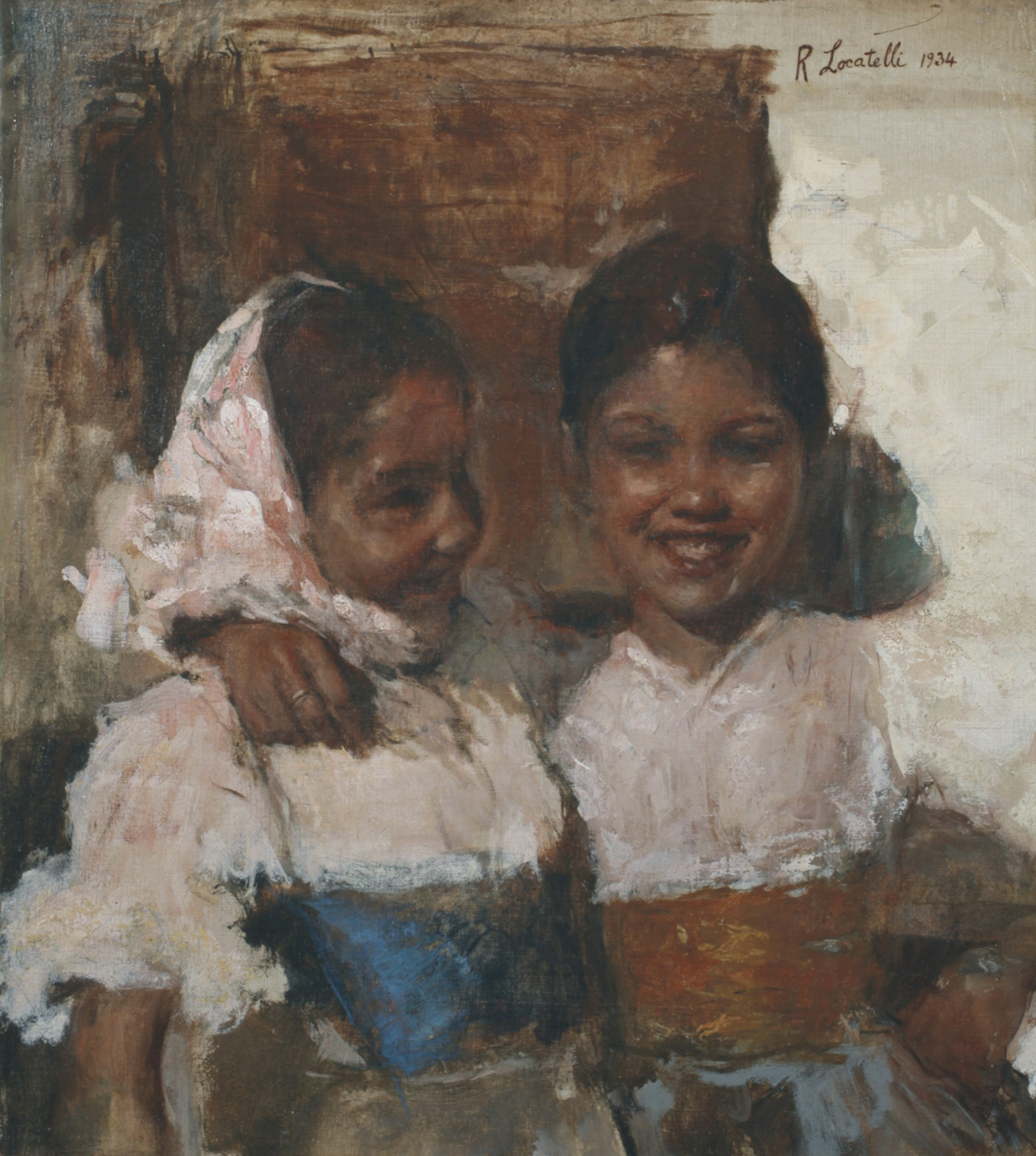
Best Friends by Romualdo Locatelli (1934)

Friendship is a relationship of mutual affection between people. It is a stronger form of interpersonal bond than an "acquaintance" or an "association", such as a classmate, neighbor, coworker, or colleague.

Although there are many forms of friendship, certain features are common to many such bonds, such as choosing to be with one another, enjoying time spent together, and being able to engage in a positive and supportive role to one another.

Sometimes friends are distinguished from family, as in the saying "friends and family", and sometimes from lovers (e.g., "lovers and friends"), although the line is blurred with friends with benefits (see also unrequited love).

The quality of affability constitutes a capacity or disposition towards being friendly and approachable.

Friendship has been studied in academic fields, such as communication, sociology, social psychology, anthropology, and philosophy. Various academic theories of friendship have been proposed, including social exchange theory, equity theory, relational dialectics, and attachment styles.

== Developmental psychology ==
=== Childhood ===
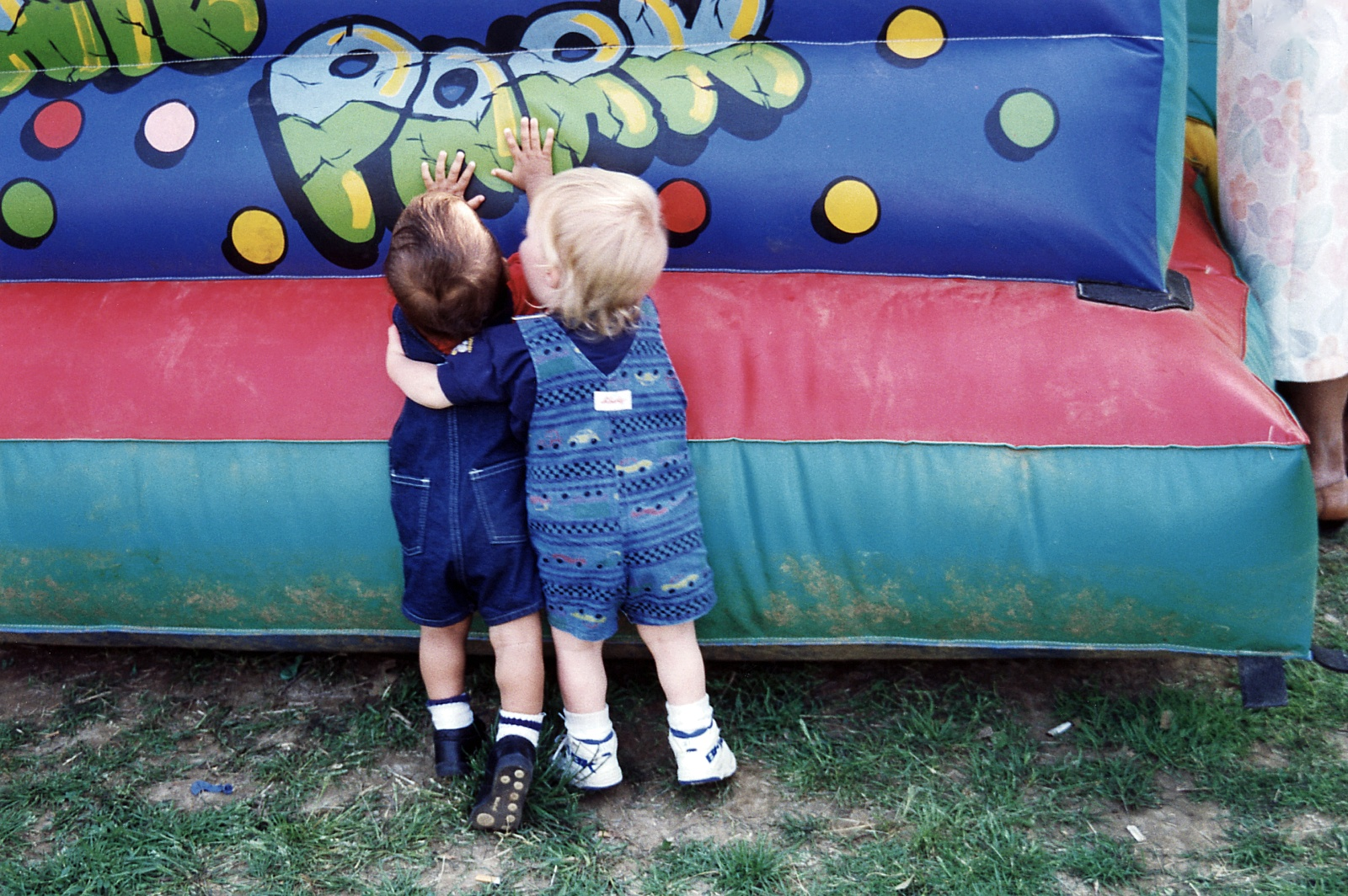

Building friendships in childhood can help develop social skills like empathy and openness.

The understanding of friendship by children tends to be focused on areas such as common activities, physical proximity, and shared expectations. (Note: In comparison to older respondents, who tend to describe friendship in terms of psychological rather than mostly physical aspects.) Such friendships provide an opportunity for playing and practicing self-regulation. Most children tend to describe friendship in terms of things like sharing, and children are more likely to share with someone they consider to be a friend.

Recent work on friendship in young children investigated the cues they use to infer friendship. Young children use cues such as sharing resources, like snacks, and sharing secrets, especially in older adolescents, to determine friendship status. When comparing cues of similarity in food preference or gender, propinquity, and loyalty in adolescent children, younger children rely on similarity in gender/food preferences but more so propinquity to infer friendship while older adolescents rely heavily on propinquity to infer friendship.

As children mature, they become more reliant on others, as awareness grows. They gain the ability to empathize with their friends, and enjoy playing in groups. They also experience peer rejection as they move through the middle childhood years. Establishing good friendships at a young age helps a child to be better acclimated in society later on in their life.

Based on the reports of teachers and mothers, 75% of preschool children had at least one friend. This figure rose to 78% through the fifth grade, as measured by co-nomination as friends, and 55% had a mutual best friend. About 15% of children were found to be chronically friendless, reporting periods of at least six months without mutual friends.

Friendships in childhood can assist in the development of certain skills, such as building empathy and learning different problem-solving techniques. Coaching from parents can help children make friends. Eileen Kennedy-Moore describes three key ingredients of children's friendship formation: (1) openness, (2) similarity, and (3) shared fun. Parents can also help children understand social guidelines they have not learned on their own. Drawing from research by Robert Selman and others, Kennedy-Moore outlines developmental stages in children's friendship, reflecting an increasing capacity to understand others' perspectives: "I Want It My Way", "What's In It For Me?", "By the Rules", "Caring and Sharing", and "Friends Through Thick and Thin."

=== Adolescence ===
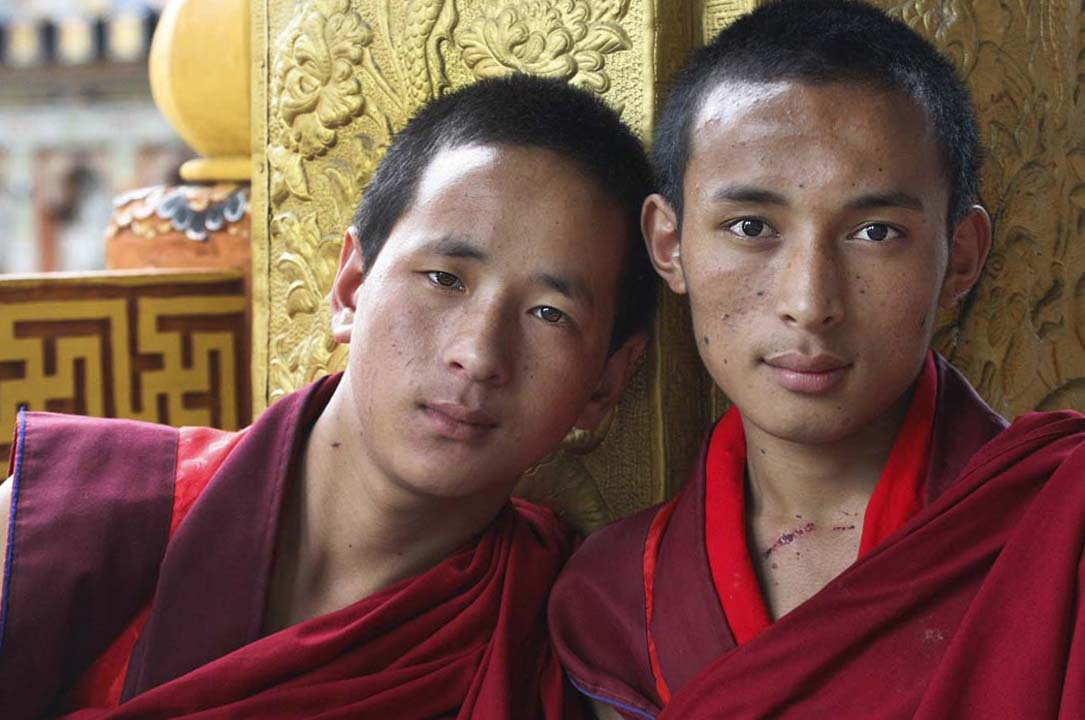
Two friends sitting together in Bhutan

In adolescence, friendships become "more giving, sharing, frank, supportive, and spontaneous." Adolescents tend to seek out peers who can provide such qualities in a reciprocal relationship, and to avoid peers whose problematic behavior suggests they may not be able to satisfy these needs. Particular personal characteristics and dispositions are also features sought by adolescents, when choosing whom to begin a friendship with. During adolescence, friendship relationships are more based on similar morals and values, loyalty, and shared interests than those of children, whose friendships stem from being in the same vicinity and access to playthings.

A large study of American adolescents determined how their engagement in problematic behaviour (such as stealing, fighting, and truancy) was related to their friendships. Findings indicated that adolescents who were less likely to engage in problematic behaviour had friends who did well in school, participated in school activities, avoided drinking, and had good mental health. The opposite was true of adolescents who did engage in problematic behavior. Whether adolescents were influenced by their friends to engage in problem behavior depended on how much they were exposed to those friends, and whether they and their friendship groups "fit in" at school.

Friendships formed during post-secondary education last longer than friendships formed earlier. In late adolescence, cross-racial friendships tend to be uncommon, likely due to prejudice and cultural differences.

=== Adulthood ===
Friendship in adulthood provides companionship, affection, and emotional support, and contributes positively to mental well-being and improved physical health.

Adults may find it particularly difficult to maintain meaningful friendships in the workplace. "The workplace can crackle with competition, so people learn to hide vulnerabilities and quirks from colleagues. Work friendships often take on a transactional feel; it is difficult to say where networking ends and real friendship begins." Many adults value the financial well-being and security that their job provides, more than developing friendships with coworkers. A 2023 Pew Research Center survey reported that of the people who responded, 8% report having no close friends, with an additional 7% reporting only 1 close friend.

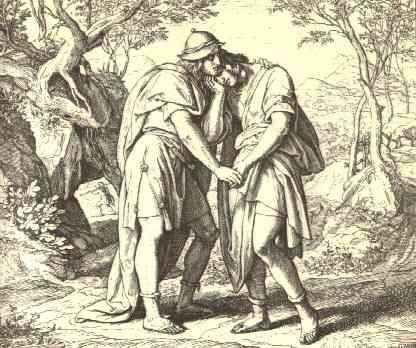
Freundschaft zwischen Jonathan und David by Julius Schnorr von Karolsfeld (1860), which translates in English as Friendship between Jonathan and David

2,000 American adults surveyed had an average of two close friends, defined as "people they had 'discussed important matters' with in the past six months". Numerous studies with adults suggest that friendships and other supportive relationships enhance self-esteem.

=== Older adults ===
Older adults report high levels of personal satisfaction in their friendships as they age, even as the overall number of friends tends to decline. This satisfaction is associated with an increased ability to accomplish activities of daily living, as well as a reduced decline in cognitive abilities, decreased instances of hospitalization, and better outcomes related to rehabilitation. The overall number of reported friends in later life may be impacted by lucidity, speech and vision, and marital status. A decline in the number of friends an individual has as they become older has been explained by Carstensen's Socioemotional Selectivity Theory, which describes a change in motivation that adults experience when socializing. The theory states that an increase in age is characterized by a shift from information-gathering to emotional regulation; in order to maintain positive emotions, older adults restrict their social groups to those with whom they share an emotional bond. As one review phrased it:

Research within the past four decades has now consistently found that older adults reporting the highest levels of happiness and general well being also report strong, close ties to numerous friends.

As family responsibilities and vocational pressures lessen, friendships become more important. Among the elderly, friendships can provide links to the larger community, serve as a protective factor against depression and loneliness, and compensate for potential losses in social support previously given by family members. Especially for people who cannot go out as often, interactions with friends allow for continued societal interaction. Additionally, older adults in declining health who remain in contact with friends show improved psychological well-being.

== Forming and maintaining ==
Forming and maintaining friendships often requires time and effort. To form a friendship requires around 20 to 60 hours of interacting in the first weeks after meeting, while forming a close friendship can take more than hundred hours.

Friendships are foremost formed by choice, typically on the basis that the parties involved admire each other and enjoy commonality and socializing.

Given that friendships provide people with many mental, social, and health benefits, people should want to associate with and form lasting relationships with people who can provide the benefits they need. Thus, people have specific friendship preferences for the types of behaviors and traits that are associated with these benefits. Recent work on friendship preferences shows that while there is much overlap between men and women for the traits they prefer in close same-gender friends (e.g., being prioritized over other friends, friends with varied knowledge/skills), there are some differences: women compared to men had greater preference for emotional support, emotional disclosure, and emotional reassurance, while men had greater preference for friends that offer opportunities for accruing status that boosts their reputation, and that will provide physical aid.

Most people underestimate how much other people like them, also called the liking gap. Increasing the expectations of acceptance can close the liking gap and make it easier to form friendships.

Friends tend to be similar to one another in terms of age, gender, behavior, substance abuse, personal disposition, and academic performance.

According to communications professor Jeffery Hall, most friendships involve tacitly agreed-upon expectations in six different areas:

Positive regard
friends genuinely like each other, and are not merely pretending to like each other for the purpose of social climbing or some other desired benefit.
Self-disclosure
friends feel that they can discuss topics of deep personal significance.
Instrumental aid
friends help each other in practical ways. For example, a friend might drive another friend to the airport.
Similarity
The friends have similar worldviews. For example, they might have the same culture, class, religion, or life experiences.
Enjoyment
friends believe that it is fun and easy to spend time together.
Agency
friends have valuable information, skills, or resources that they can share with each other. For example, a friend with business connections might know when a desirable job will be available, or a wealthy friend might pay for an expensive experience.

Not all relationships have the same balance of each area. For example, women may prefer friendships that emphasize genuine positive regard and deeper self-disclosure, and men may prefer friendships with a little more agency.

=== Developmental issues ===
People with certain types of developmental disorders may struggle to make and maintain friendships. This is especially true of children with attention deficit hyperactivity disorder (ADHD), autism spectrum disorders, or Down syndrome.

=== Dissolution ===
Friendships may end. This is often the result of natural changes over time, as friends grow more distant both physically and emotionally, but it can also be the result of a sudden shock, such as learning that a friend holds incompatible values.

The dissolution of a friendship may be taken personally as a rejection. Disruptions of friendships are associated with increased guilt, anger, and depression, and may be highly stressful events, especially in childhood. However, potential negative effects can be mitigated if the dissolution of a friendship is replaced with another close relationship.

== Types of friendship ==
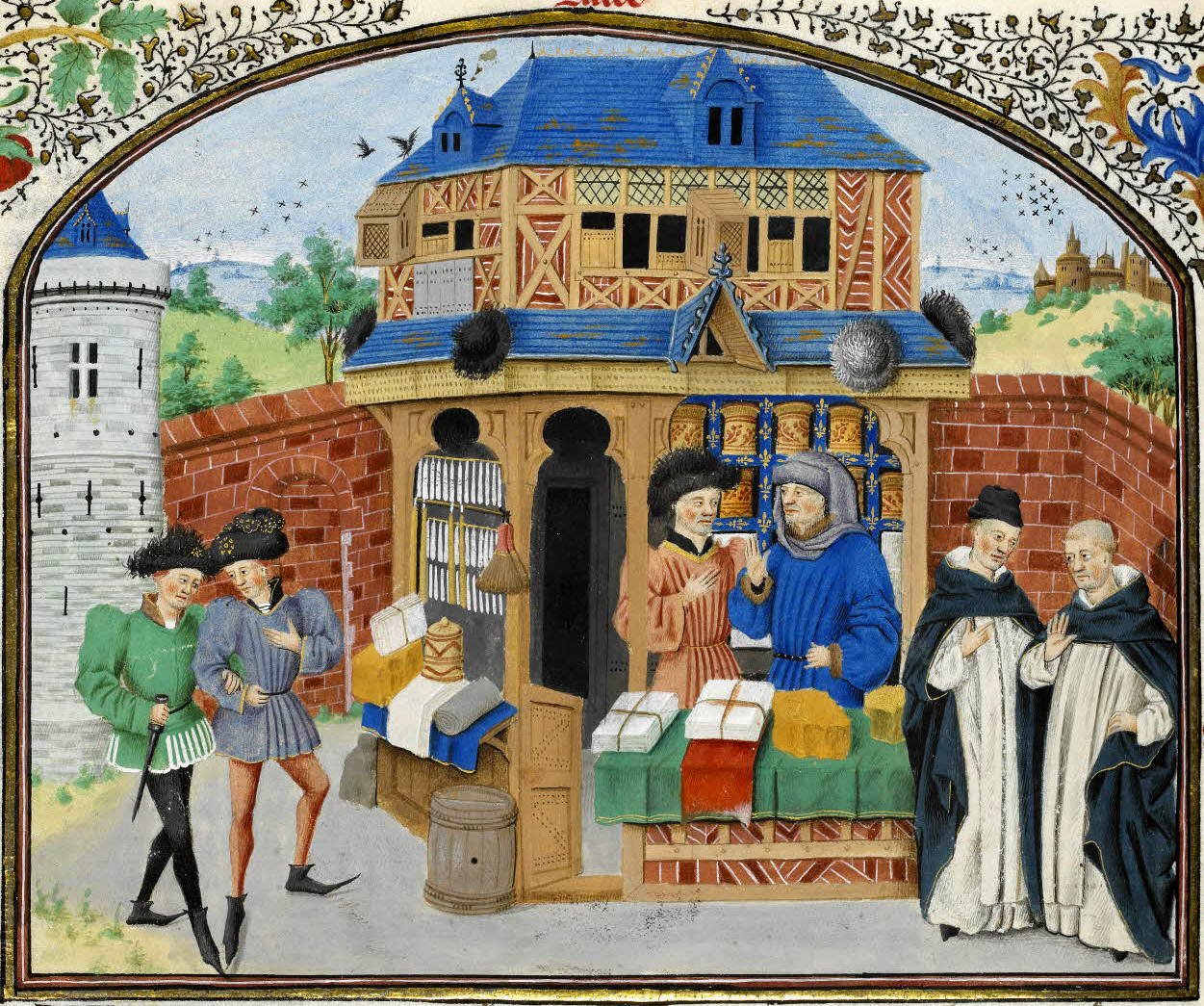
"Friends of pastime, friends of advantage, and friends of the good", Aristotle's classification, XV century illustration

Aristotle wrote of there being three kinds of friendships: those in recognition of pleasure, those in recognition of advantage, and those in recognition of virtue.

=== Same-sex friendships ===
In general, female bonding tends to focus on interpersonal connections and mutual support. Women tend to be more expressive in their same-sex friendships. Girls report more anxiety, jealousy, and relational victimization and less stability related to their friendships.

Male bonding can be more focused on social status, and may discourage the expression of emotional needs. Men are more likely to define friendships in terms of shared physical experiences. Boys report higher levels of physical violence related to their friendships.

Male-male friendships are generally more like alliances, while female-female friendships are much more attachment-based. This also means that the end of male-male friendships tends to be less emotionally upsetting than that of female-female friendships. Many older men may rely upon a female companion, such as a spouse, to compensate for their comparative lack of social capital. One study found that women in Europe and North America were slightly more likely than men to self-report having a best friend.

Preference for same sex friendships over cross-sex friendships is also called homosociality or gender homophily.

=== Cross-sex friendships ===
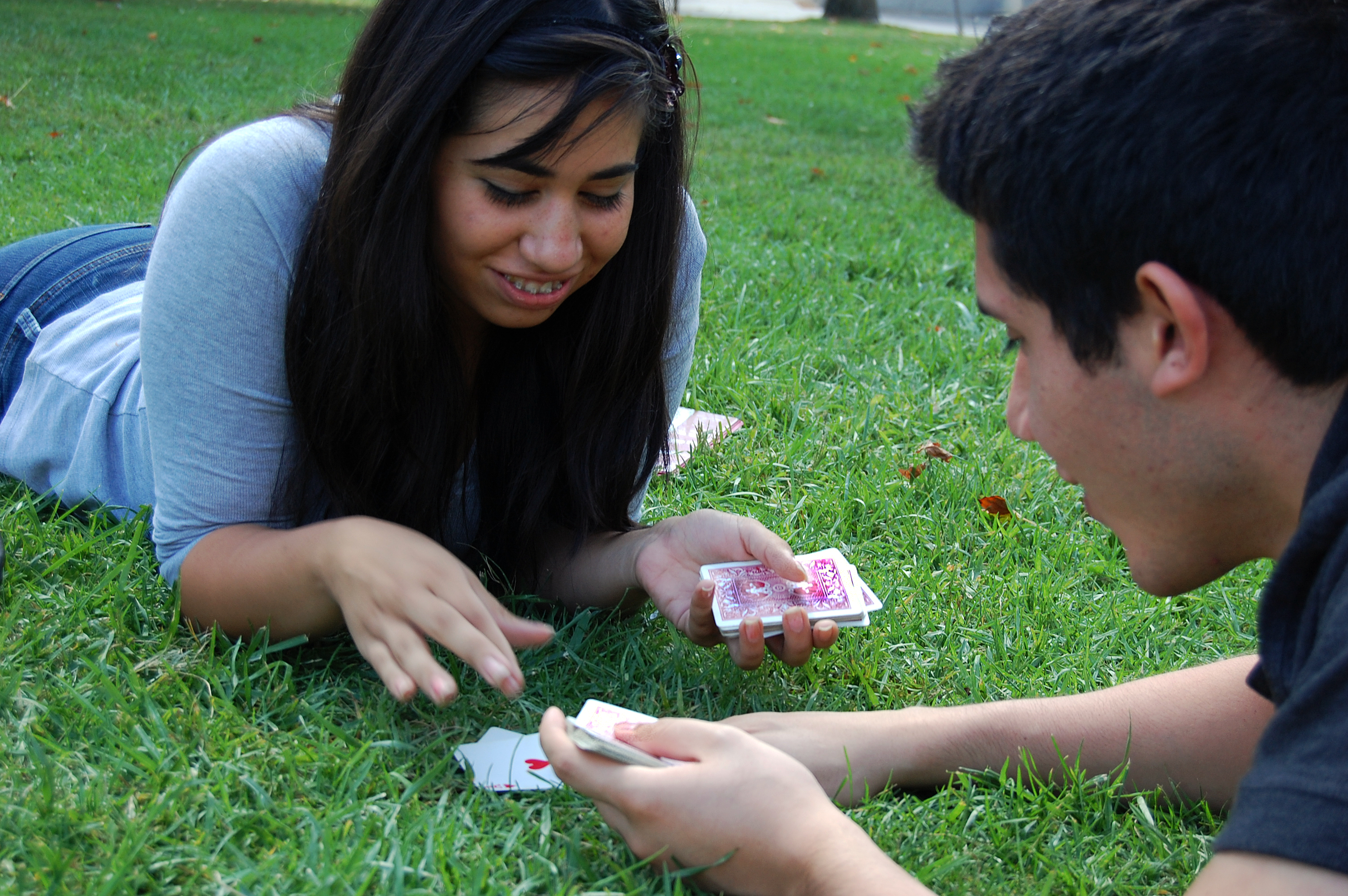
A young man and woman playing cards

Cross-sex friendships are non-intimate friendships between men and women, also described as heterosociality or gender heterophily. Friendships between men and women have little presence in recorded history, having only become a widely accepted practice in the 20th century. The rate of cross-sex friendships relative to same-sex friendships varies by country. Sex segregation can prevent cross-sex friendships.

=== Culture ===
Which relationships count as true friendship rather than an acquaintance or co-worker relationship vary by culture. In English-speaking cultures, it is not unusual for people to include weaker relationships as being friends. In other cultures, such as the Russian and Polish cultures, only the most significant relationships are considered friends. A Russian might have one or two friends plus a large number of "pals" or acquaintances; a Canadian in similar circumstances might count all of these relationships as being friends.

In Western cultures, friendships are often seen as lesser to familial or romantic relationships. Friendships in Ancient Greece were more utilitarian than affectionate, being based upon obligation and reliance, though different Classical communities understood friendship in different ways, and the Greeks held a much broader conception of friendship than modern English-speaking cultures do.

When discussing taboos of friendship it was found that Chinese respondents found more than their British counterparts.

In ethnically diverse countries, children and adolescents tend to form friendships with others of the same race or ethnicity, beginning in preschool, and peaking in middle or late childhood.

Opinion polls show people across countries tend to put high value on close friendships.

== Evolutionary approach ==
Evolutionary approaches to understanding friendship focus primarily on its function. In other words, what does friendship do for individuals, how does it work psychologically, and how do these processes affect people's actual behavior. Within this field, there are multiple proposed theories or perspectives about the function of forming friendships and making friends. One is the theory of Reciprocal Altruism which provides an explanation as to why individuals make friends with un-related others. It argues that friendship allows people to exchange benefits with each other and keep track of these exchanges in order to avoid exchanging benefits with a poor cooperator, or someone who will take benefits without giving any in return. Another perspective likens friendships to insurance investments and argues when deciding to invest into forming a new friendship with another person an individual should be able to discern: whether the potential friend will be willing to help them in the future, if the potential friend is in a position to help them in the future, and if the friendship is worth continuing or not, especially when many other potential friendships can be made. These factors will determine whether forming a friendship with someone will be beneficial or injurious. Another explanation for the function of friendships is called the Alliance Hypothesis which argues that the function of friendships is to acquire alliances for future conflicts or disputes. The Alliance Hypothesis states that conflicts typically can be won if and only if one side is able to acquire more allies than the competing side, all else equal, so individuals should be able to increase their odds of winning the conflict if they are able to recruit more alliances to their side. Choosing your allies can be very important and there exists a variety of methods in deciding allies such as bandwagoning or choosing an ally that is loyal and will come to your aid in the future conflicts. Thus, individuals should form alliances (i.e., friendships) with people that ranks themselves higher than other allies/friends. It is relative rank (i.e., where the self ranks among all other individuals) that is the most important contributing factor when deciding who is a loyal ally and friend.

== Health ==
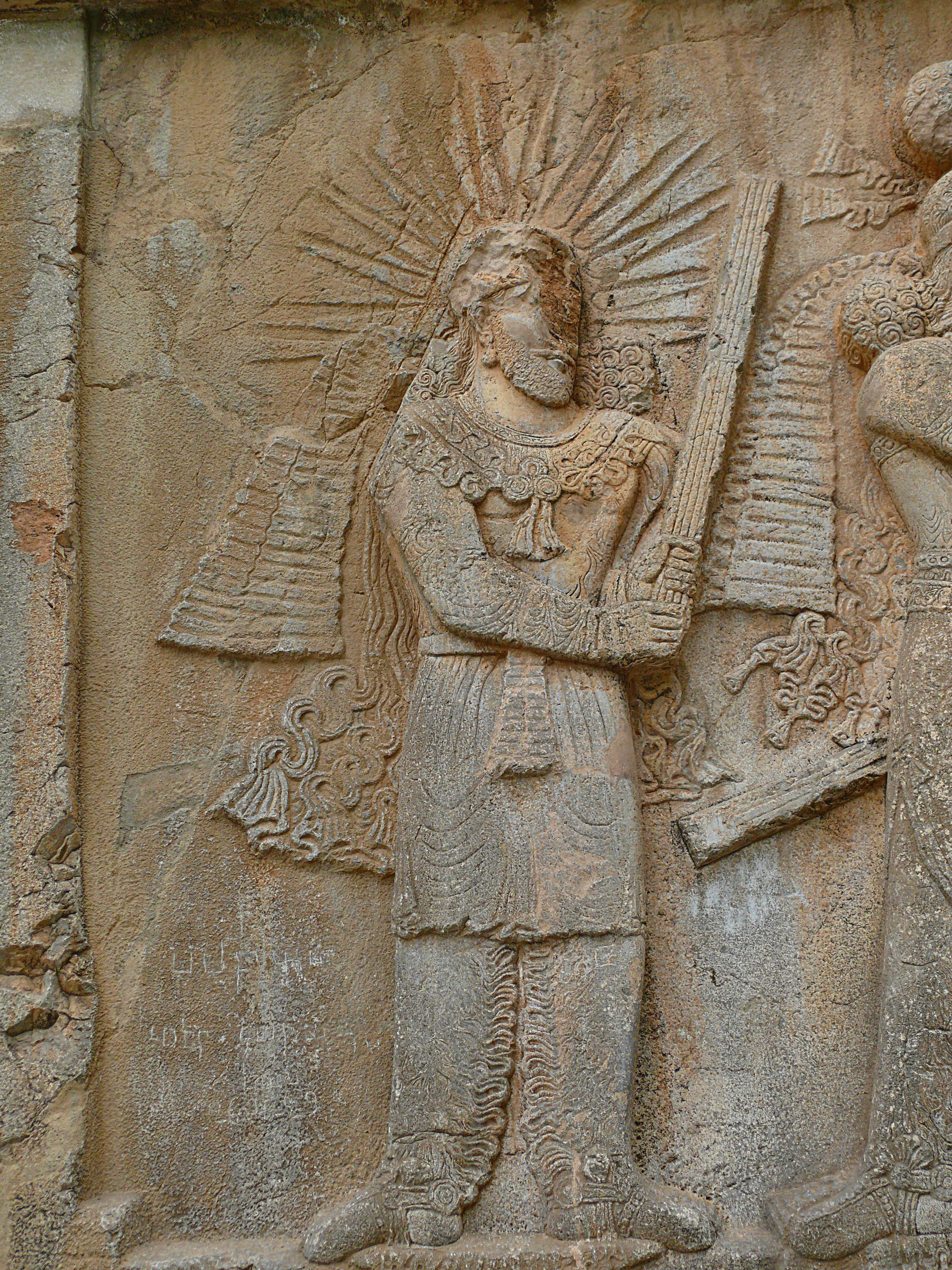
The Persian god Mithra, of covenants, light, oaths, justice, the sun, contracts, and friendship

Studies found that strong social supports improve a person's prospects for good health and longevity. Conversely, loneliness and a lack of social supports are linked to an increased risk of heart disease, viral infections, and cancer, as well as higher mortality rates overall. Researchers termed friendship networks a "behavioral vaccine" that boosts both physical and mental health.

A large body of research links friendship and health, but the precise reasons for the connection remain unclear. Most studies in this area are large prospective studies that follow people over time, and while there may be a correlation between the two variables (friendship and health status), researchers still do not know if there is a cause and effect relationship (such as: good friendships improve health). Theories that attempt to explain this link include that good friends encourage their friends to lead more healthy lifestyles; that good friends encourage their friends to seek help and access services when needed; that good friends enhance their friends' coping skills in dealing with illness and other health problems; and that good friends actually affect physiological pathways that are protective of health.

=== Mental health ===
Having few or no friends is a common experience among those who are diagnosed with a range of mental disorders, and can be used as a telling factor. A 2004 study from the American Journal of Public Health observed that lack of friendship plays a role in increasing risk of suicidal ideation among female adolescents, while also true for having more friends who are not themselves friends with one another. However, it is also suggested that no similar effect is observed for males.

Higher friendship quality directly contributes to self-esteem, self-confidence, and social development. A World Happiness Database study found that people with close friendships are happier, although the absolute number of friends did not increase happiness. Other studies suggested that children who have friendships of a high quality may be protected against the development of certain disorders, such as anxiety and depression. Conversely, having few friends is associated with dropping out of school, as well as aggression, adult crime, and loneliness. Peer rejection is also associated with reduced subsequent aspiration in the workforce and participation in social activities, while higher levels of friendship were associated with higher adult self-esteem.

Having more close friends is correlated with improved mental health and cognitive ability. However, this association stops once around five friends is reached, after which having more friends is no longer linked to better mental health and is correlated with lower cognition. Additionally, people with few or many friends had more symptoms of Attention deficit hyperactivity disorder (ADHD) and were less able to learn from their experiences.

== Friendship jealousy ==
Jealousy is an emotion that is often studied in the context of romantic and sexual relationships. However, individuals also feel jealous when it comes to potentially losing valued friendships. Friendship jealousy acts as an alert to the self that a close friends' other friends may be a threat to the self's relationship with that close friend which motivates the self to enact behaviors that prevent the close friend from further developing better relationships with their other friends. A recent multi-study paper found that friendship jealousy is activated by the potential loss of a friend by another person, is highly attuned to the feeling or thoughts of being replaced, and that the closer or more valued that friendship is, the more friendship jealousy someone will feel. Men and women also tend to express different levels of friendship jealousy depending on the person who is attempting to replace them in the friendship, such that women compared to men expressed more jealousy over the potential loss of a best-friend to another woman.

== Non-human friendship ==
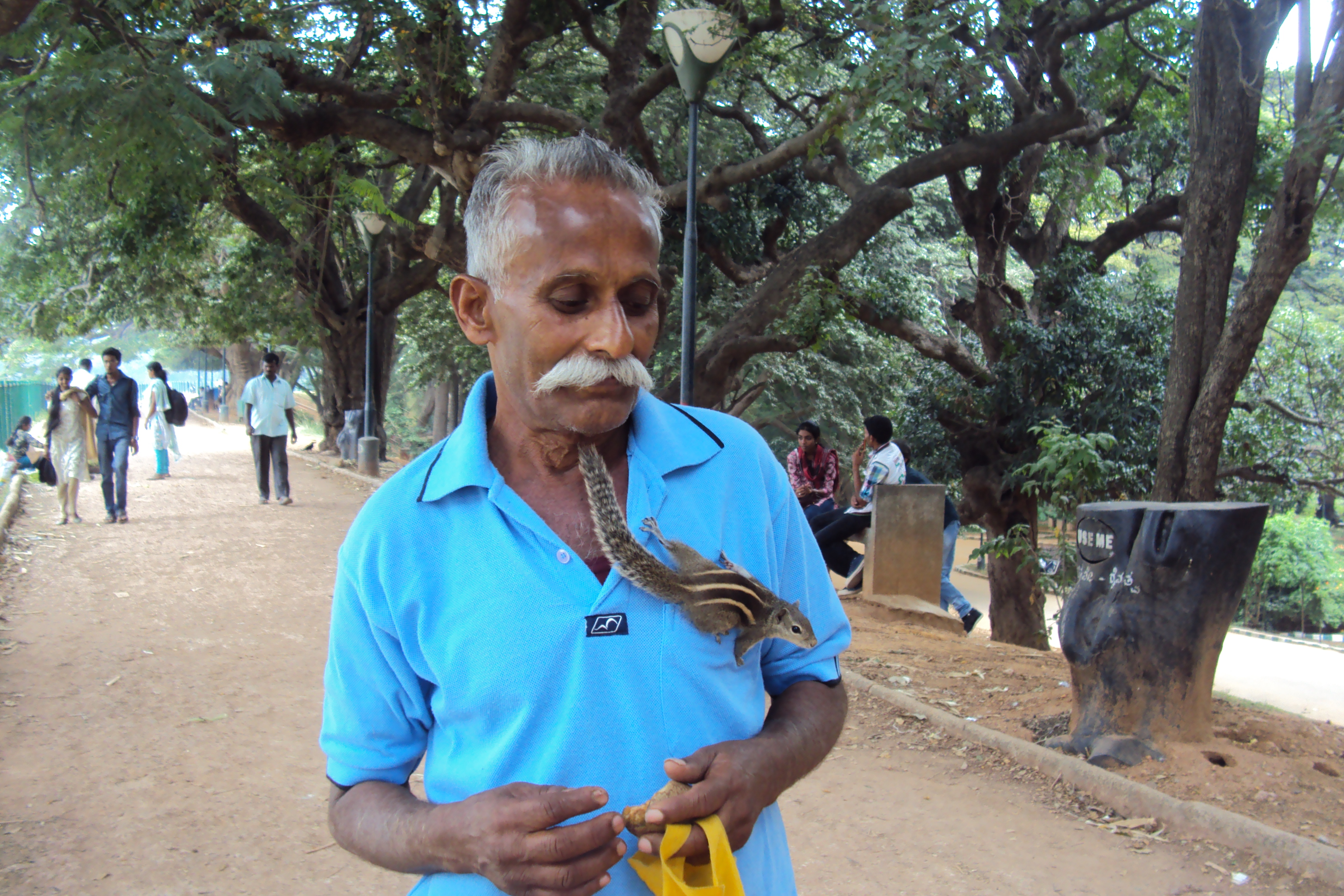
A man with an Indian palm squirrel (Funambulus palmarum)

Friendship is found among animals of higher intelligence, such as higher mammals and some birds. There is ample comparative animal research on the existence of friendships, or the existence of similar forms of relationships, in animals. The function of these relationships in non-human animals appears to primarily be for forming and solidifying alliances for a wide range of fitness and survival reasons. Across a range of non-human animal species, alliances are formed for protection, competition over reproductive access to receptive mates, as means to seek social comfort, to solidify social bonds, and to thwart diseases. An expansive meta-analysis examining grooming behaviors in 14 different primate species found that grooming behaviors elicit different types of benefit exchanges, such as support and aid for future intra-species conflicts. Male bottlenose dolphins use synchronous surfacing to determine membership of other potential male allies while female bottlenose dolphins use gentle contact behaviors (i.e., touching behaviors) with other females in response to harassment from males. Female spotted hyenas, whose groups follow a very strict dominance hierarchy, form alliances (i.e., coalitionary bonds) to move up the dominance hierarchy by usurping a hyena of higher dominance rank. Feral female horses develop alliances with other female horses to avoid harassment from male horses and these alliances aid in increasing their offspring's chances of survival.

== See also ==
- Blood brother
- Boston marriage
- Casual relationship
- Fraternization
- Frenemy
- Friend of a friend
- Friends of Libraries
- Friendship Day
- Friend zone
- Imaginary friend
- Kalyāṇa-mittatā (spiritual friendship)
- Nicomachean Ethics, Books VIII and IX: Friendship and partnership
- Platonic love
- Prosocial behavior
- Queerplatonic relationship
- Romantic friendship
- Sharing
- Social connection
- Theorem on friends and strangers
- Womance
