= Eileen Kennedy =

Eileen Kennedy may refer to:

- Eileen Kennedy (judge), Ireland's first female judge
- Eileen Kennedy (nutritionist), former director of the Center for Nutrition Policy and Promotion
- Eileen Kennedy-Moore, clinical psychologist and author
