= Friendship jealousy =

Jealousy towards a third-party perceived as a threat to one's friendships

Friendship jealousy refers to the type of jealousy experienced when an individual perceives a third-party threat to one of their valued friendships. It is not to be confused with envy, or wanting what a friend has.

Jealousy is a complex social emotion often described as a mixture of anger, anxiety, and sadness, though it has also been associated with feelings of hurt, rejection, betrayal, uncertainty, insecurity, and self-consciousness. Despite its typical portrayal in the context of romantic or sexual relationships, jealousy can arise whenever an individual perceives a third-party threat to the status, stability, or exclusivity of one of their existing bonds. Thus, children can feel jealousy when their parents give more attention to their siblings, and friends can feel jealousy when their friends make new friends.

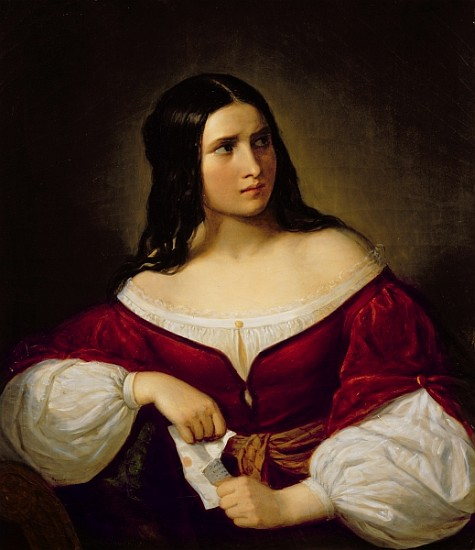
Jealousy, by Natale Schiavoni

Friendship is typically conceptualized as a dyadic relationship – that is, a close, medium- to long-term relationship between two people. However, dyadic relationships do not exist in a vacuum; rather, they exist within the context of a broader social network, in which associates – such as partners, friends, and enemies – can interact and have their own independent relationships with other people (e.g., strangers). Notably, these interactions and relationships can have substantial impacts on each dyadic partners' well-being. As such, third-party threats to an individual's friendship can come in many forms: a mutual friend, a known acquaintance, a new romantic partner, or an unknown stranger, for example. Commonly used terms describing third-party friendship threats include rival, competitor, poacher, and interloper.

== Drivers of friendship jealousy ==
Whether and to what extent an individual experiences friendship jealousy depends on several factors.

=== Time allocation ===
The number of close relationships an individual can form and maintain is constrained in part by the limited amount of time that individual has to invest in their relationships. Previous empirical research has shown that when a person forms a new or newly close relationship with another individual, that person's existing relationship partners may be ejected from the innermost circle of affection and demoted into less close ones. As such, individuals are likely to feel threatened – and thus jealous – when a friend begins to allocate an unusual, unprecedented, or disproportionate amount of time to their other relationships. The level of threat perceived and ensuing jealousy experienced are expected to increase when a friend's time dedicated to nurturing a budding relationship begins to interfere with the time being allocated to the individual.

=== Replacement threat and friendship value ===
Competition over highly valued friends is likely to result in increased jealousy.

An individual's ability to form and maintain multiple close friendships is similarly limited by the maximum number of "slots" or niches available in their friendship hierarchy. It is possible that not every slot is of equal importance; indeed, some have suggested that people rank their friends – for example, with best friends at the top of the ladder and other friends in descending closeness and liking. Generally speaking, the more valuable a friendship is to an individual, the more likely that friend is to attain a higher position in the individual's friendship hierarchy, and the greater the level of jealousy experienced in response to a perceived rival. Friendship value itself is believed to be driven by two main factors: the relative benefits the friendship has to offer, and the extent to which a friend fulfills their friendship partner's friend preferences. Value might also translate to the idea of irreplaceability. For example, a friend who is generous, reliable, and honest offers a more valuable friendship than a friend who is selfish, unreliable, and deceitful, and a friend who is serious and shy will be less valuable to a person who prefers lighthearted, extraverted friends. Moreover, a friend who is generous, reliable, honest, lighthearted, extraverted, and likes the same obscure music artist as that person will be more irreplaceable than a friend missing any one of those qualities. Because value is a major determinant of hierarchical rank, friends in lower ranked positions are more vulnerable to replacement than those in higher ranked ones. Furthermore, the more likely an individual is to be replaced in terms of their respective hierarchical rank, the greater the likelihood that jealousy will be evoked.

=== Reciprocity violations ===
In the context of friendship, reciprocity refers to the expectation that friendships will be relatively symmetric in regards to exchanges of emotional support, time, assistance, favors, and other kinds of costly investments. In other words, friends should give and take resources in roughly equal proportions. When reciprocity is violated and one friend feels that they are giving more than they are receiving due to third-party interference, jealousy can arise. For example, if an individual consistently provides emotional support for their friend, but that friend does not reciprocate the same level of emotional support because they are diverting support resources to a different relationship, the individual is likely to experience friendship jealousy.

=== Threats to self-evaluation ===
Although not yet illustrated in the context of friendships specifically, threats to self-evaluation have been shown to evoke jealousy in both familial and romantic relationships. Self-evaluation maintenance theory posits that threats to self-evaluation – or one's belief about one's own strengths, capabilities, and overall worth or value – spur negative emotions which drive behaviors aimed at diminishing those threats. Furthermore, the dimensions an individual holds most central to their self-evaluation have been shown to be the dimensions granted the most weight in assessing the threat posed by a friendship rival. For example, if intelligence is more important to an individual's self-evaluation than physical attractiveness, a rival who is physically attractive but unintelligent may not pose much threat, and is thus unlikely to evoke friendship jealousy. Conversely, a rival who is more intelligent will pose a substantial threat to the individual's self-evaluation, and friendship jealousy is more likely to occur.

=== Cultural influences and social norms ===
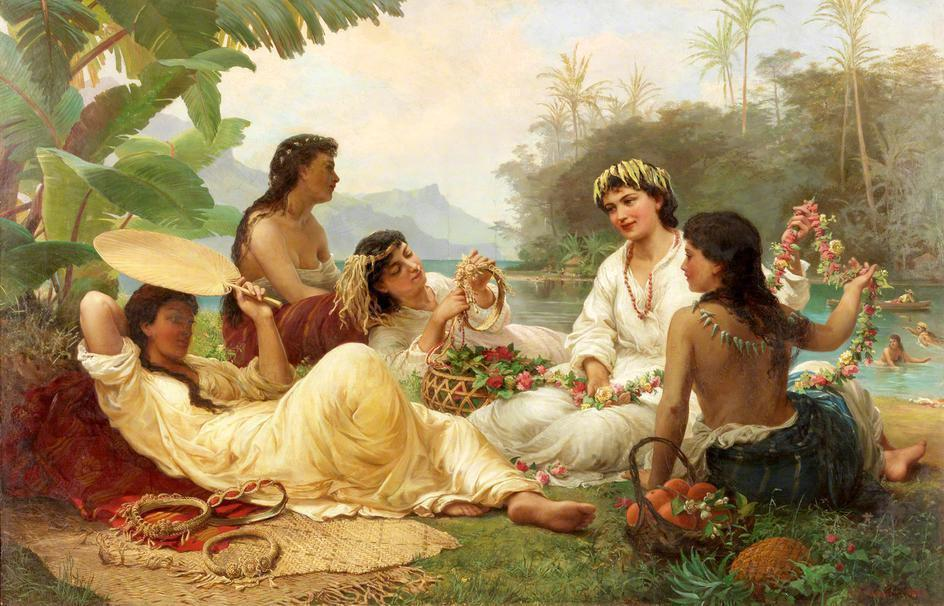
Friendship jealousy may be experienced and displayed differently across cultures.

Friendship jealousy appears to be a human universal, as it transcends region and culture. However, there are some important ways in which culture and social norms might impact the extent to which an individual experiences, perceives, and behaves in response to friendship jealousy.

Friendship jealousy is expected to be more prominent in some cultures than in others due to the differential importance placed on the maintenance of close, non-kin, non-romantic social bonds. Relatedly, cultures in which friendships are highly valued, such as those marked by individualism, are likely to yield higher levels of friendship jealousy. In some cultures, however, avoiding overt expressions of conflict is essential in maintaining positive friendships, so certain displays of friendship jealousy may be stigmatized and less likely to occur. In alignment with research on cross-cultural differences in the link between romantic jealousy and permissiveness toward extramarital sex, it is also likely that sociocultural norms concerning friendship exclusivity might influence the experience of friendship jealousy.

=== Individual differences ===
==== Self-esteem ====
Having low self-esteem has been associated with increased vulnerability to friendship jealousy. This pattern can be explained by the upward social comparisons those with low self-esteem perform when assessing a rival; concluding that one's rival is more valuable than oneself will lead to increased replacement threat, and a resulting increase in friendship jealousy. At the same time, having an inflated self-esteem might also increase friendship jealousy vulnerability due to the instability and fragility which characterize unrealistically high levels of self-esteem. An individual with an inflated self-esteem is more likely to perceive ambiguous stimuli in ego-threatening ways. For example, if a person with an inflated self-esteem witnesses their best friend engaging in conversation with a third-party, they might assume that their status in their best friend's friend hierarchy is being challenged, and friendship jealousy is likely to occur.

==== Attachment style ====
Research on romantic relationships suggests that there is indeed a link between attachment style and jealousy. Specifically, individuals who demonstrate insecure attachments are more likely to experience romantic jealousy. Although less well-established in the context of friendship, the association between attachment style and jealousy appears to persist. Specifically, individuals with anxious attachment styles are prone to higher levels of friendship jealousy than those with avoidant or secure attachment styles. These associations might be explained by the relationship between anxious attachment and increased fear of abandonment and rejection, surveillance and reassurance-seeking behaviors, and a tendency to interpret social stimuli negatively.

==== Personality traits ====
Various personality traits have been shown to be associated with friendship jealousy. Aggressive individuals, for example, are more likely to be jealous and possessive of their friends, a finding which is consistent with research on romantic jealousy. With regards to Big Five personality traits, higher levels of neuroticism, and lower levels of openness and conscientiousness have also been linked to increased friendship jealousy.

==== Sex/Gender ====
Women and girls generally report higher levels of friendship jealousy than men and boys do. This difference has been observed both in real-world and social media contexts, where women report more social media friendship jealousy relative to men. However, while women report greater friendship jealousy in best friendships, men appear to experience greater friendship jealousy when faced with the prospective loss of mere acquaintances.

Several explanations have been offered here. Girls tend to place importance on the exclusivity of their friendships, seek emotional support from their friends, expect loyalty and commitment from their friends, and protect their social circles and activities from outsiders via social exclusion tactics more than boys do. Conversely, boys' social groups are often more sizable and shallow than girls' are. Furthermore, girls seem to be more concerned with their relative hierarchical rank within their social groups – a quality which might increase the salience of replacement threat in their friendships. Human females are also more likely to believe that when faced with a friendship rival, certain actions they take can successfully block prospective interference. Human females' closest same-sex friendships have also been shown to be more fragile than males', with females reporting proportionally higher instances of friendship dissolution.

==== Age ====
People's vulnerability to friendship jealousy varies over development. However, this variability does not follow a linear trend; the likelihood of experiencing friendship jealousy appears to increase as children age, decrease as children enter adolescence, and increase again from middle adolescence onward. Although friendship jealousy has been shown to persist into young adulthood, more research is needed to identify trends in friendship jealousy over the lifespan.

==== Mental health ====
When individuals experience mental health challenges or disorders, such as loneliness, self-esteem issues, depression, anxiety, and borderline personality disorder, they may exhibit heightened sensitivity to relational dynamics. This can lead to increased monitoring and perception of potential threats to their relationships, making them more vulnerable to friendship jealousy. However, experiencing or expressing friendship jealousy is not inherently indicative of mental health disturbances, and can occur as a normal part of navigating social relationships.

== Behaviors associated with friendship jealousy ==
=== Friend guarding ===
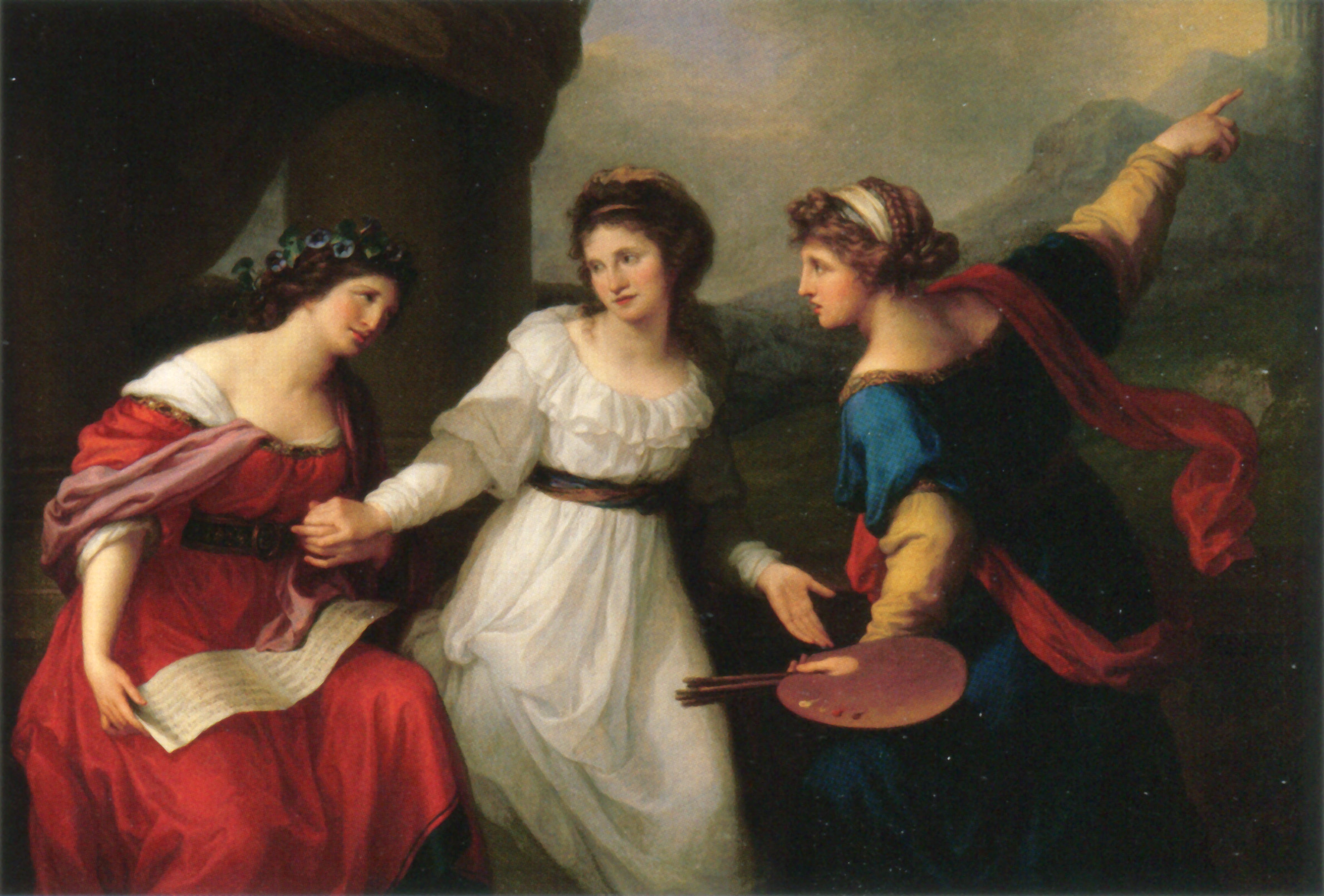
Rivals may compete for a friend's alliance by attempting to enhance their respective value.

In certain contexts, friendship jealousy may motivate a host of behaviors aimed at countering the perceived threat, a phenomenon which is generally referred to as friend guarding. Friend guarding, similar in many respects to mate guarding in romantic relationships, can manifest in a multitude of ways, and can occur with or without conscious premeditation.

==== Vigilance ====
When an individual perceives a third-party threat to their friendship, vigilance, monitoring, and surveilling efforts might increase. For example, a jealous individual may begin to pay more attention to how much time their friend is spending with a rival, make efforts to "catch" their friend spending time with a rival, and try to determine whether their friend values their friendship less than the friendship they have with a rival.

==== Separation ====
Efforts to physically separate the friend and rival may also occur. For example, an individual may try to prevent their friend from attending events where the rival will be present, increase the spatial distance between the friend and rival (e.g., by sitting between them), interrupt conversations between the friend and rival, and interfere with plans the friend and rival have made to spend time together.

==== Monopolization ====
A jealous individual may attempt to block opportunities for their friend to bond with a perceived rival by demanding so much of their friend's time and attention that the friend has little to no resources remaining to allocate to others. In other words, by monopolizing their friend's resources, an individual makes it more difficult for a perceived rival to usurp them.

==== Self/commitment enhancement ====
Enhancing one's own physical, emotional, cognitive, or behavioral qualities, demonstrating high commitment to the friendship, accentuating love, compassion, and loyalty towards one's friend, and submitting to one's friend are examples of self/commitment enhancement as a friend guarding tactic. Such behaviors can be described as attempts to strengthen the existing bond, make the history or longevity of the friendship more salient, and inflate the value a friend places on the friendship in order to avoid being replaced.

==== Benefit provisioning ====
Benefit provisioning – although most often portrayed as a mate-retention tactic in the context of romantic or sexual relationships – refers to the offering of tangible or intangible benefits by the individual to the friend in an attempt to increase the value of the friendship. For example, a jealous individual might be more likely to do their friend a favor, present them with lavish gifts, offer abundant emotional support, or provide them with access to unique, positive experiences.

==== Emotional manipulation ====
A jealous person might try to manipulate their friend's emotions in a way that secures, reaffirms, or promotes their position in the larger friendship hierarchy. For example, a person might express feelings of dependence on their friend, display dejection when their friend spends substantial time hanging out with or talking about a rival, and try to make their friend feel guilty for fostering a close relationship with a rival.

==== Possession signaling ====
Possession signaling refers to instances in which an individual engages in behaviors or communications that assert ownership or exclusivity over the friend who is the target of their friendship jealousy. Possession signaling tactics include introducing or otherwise labeling the friend as their "best friend," emphasizing the strength or closeness of the friendship to others, and strategically displaying one's level of closeness with the friend via social media posts, inside jokes, and matching clothing, tattoos, jewellery, etc.

==== Jealousy induction ====
A person experiencing friendship jealousy might also attempt to make their friend reciprocate their jealousy by parading other friendships, making plans with others in front of their friend, exaggerating the closeness of other friendships, and so on. If an individual's attempts to make their friend jealous are successful, that friend is likely to also engage in friend-guarding tactics, thus reaffirming the individual's place in their friend's social network.

==== Competitor derogation ====
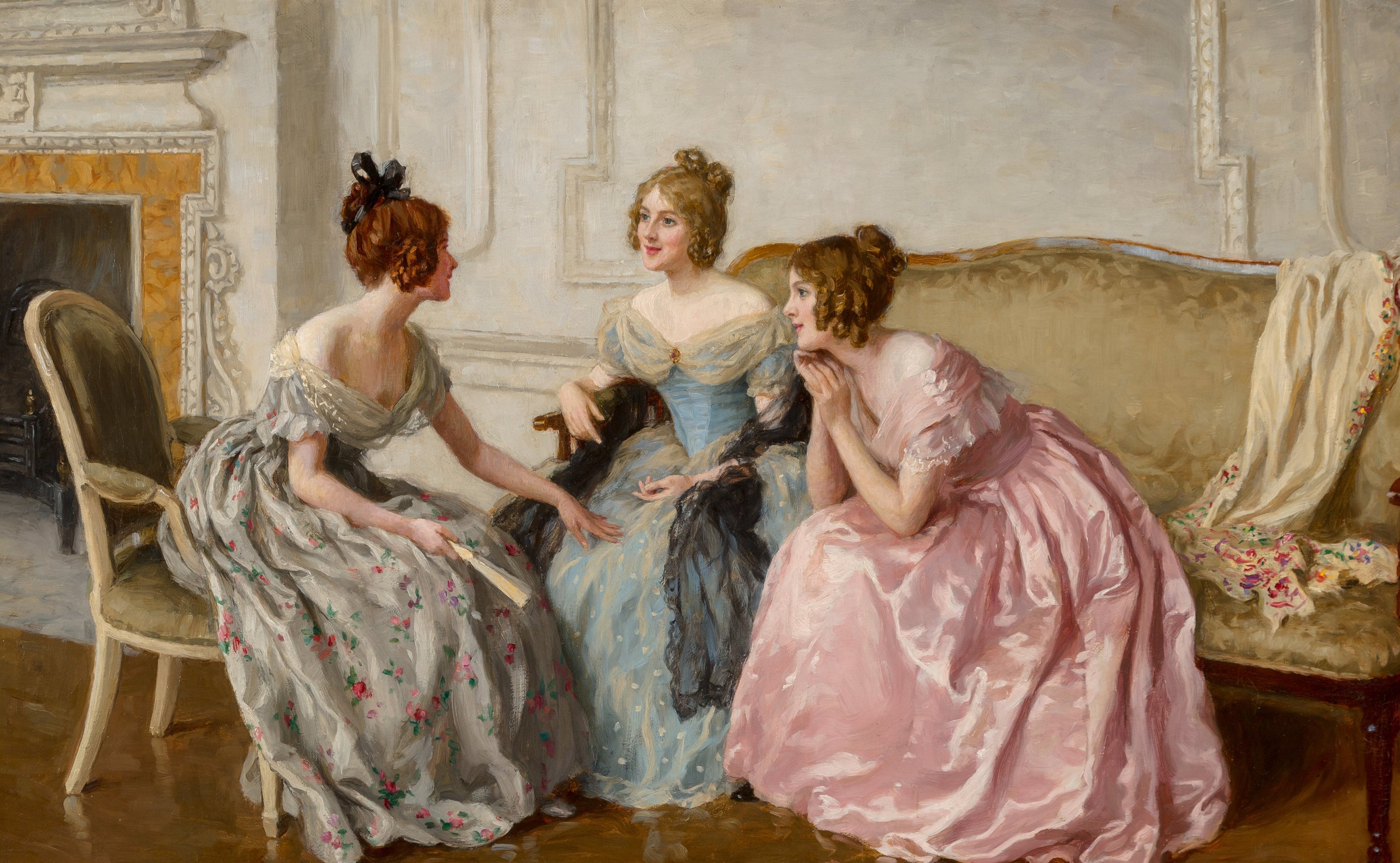
Artwork depicting three women gossiping.

A jealous individual might speak negatively to their friend about a rival's physical, emotional, cognitive, or behavioral qualities, spread negative rumors about a rival in hopes that they will reach the friend, and gossip or vent to their friend about a rival. By making their rival less appealing, an individual might be able to decrease the level of threat the rival poses to their friendship.

==== Friend derogation ====
A jealous individual might also speak negatively to their rival about the mutual friend's physical, emotional, cognitive, or behavioral qualities, regardless of whether those flaws are genuine, exaggerated, or falsified. Consequently, their friend will become less appealing, and the rival may no longer pursue the friendship.

==== Indirect competitor aggression ====
Some individuals may resort to indirect aggression in response to friendship jealousy. For example, they might attempt to make the rival feel uncomfortable or insecure in covert ways, such as by staring coldly at them, pretending not to hear them when they speak, excluding them from conversations, activities, or gatherings, and getting other friends to be mean to them. The negative emotions experienced by the rival due to indirect aggression tactics may lead them to stop pursuing the friendship.

==== Friend punishment/threat ====
When the level of friendship jealousy experienced becomes too great to manage covertly, the individual may lash out at their friend, yell, become angry, display overt jealousy, give them the "cold shoulder," or threaten to end the friendship entirely. Hostile friend-guarding tactics such as this one are unlikely to benefit the individual's friendship.

==== Direct competitor aggression ====
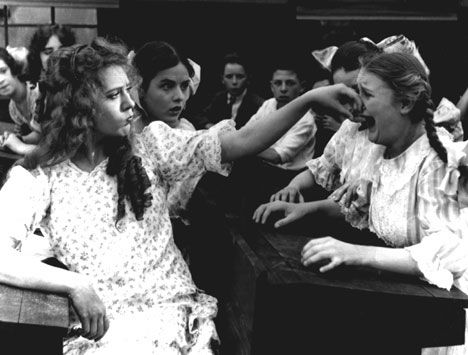
Extreme friendship jealousy may result in physical violence aimed at the perceived rival.

In its extreme form, friendship jealousy may motivate an individual to engage in aggressive confrontation, bullying, property destruction, or even physical violence directed at their rival. The costs the rival might incur as a result of direct aggression may not be worth the value of the friend; consequently, the rival is likely to withdraw from the friendship. However, mitigating third-party threats in this way may come at the cost of the friendship itself.

=== Bragging and boasting ===
Experiencing friendship jealousy might increase one's tendency to engage in bragging and boasting behaviors. For example, bragging and boasting occurring shortly after a close friend has violated reciprocity norms due to third-party interference is a sign of friendship jealousy. An individual might brag and boast in order to compensate for recent damage to their self-esteem by making their accomplishments, abilities, and possessions more salient in an effort to self-soothe, or by signaling their superiority to others in order to increase their relative friendship value.

=== Ignoring the issue/feigning indifference ===
Some individuals might ignore the issue altogether, attempt to suppress their jealousy, or feign indifference in order to avoid or mitigate discomfort, conflict, and threats to their self-esteem.

=== Open communication ===
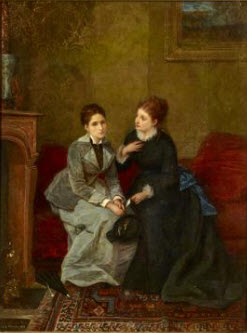
A jealous friend might confront their feelings through open communication.

In sharp contrast with the aforementioned behaviors, an individual might outwardly and openly express the uncomfortable feelings they are experiencing to the close friend who is the target of their jealousy. They might advocate for themselves by asking their friend to explain their jealousy-eliciting behaviors, clarify their intentions, and provide them with greater emotional support, time allocation, or other expected benefits. As a result, the individual is likely to better understand the friend's perspective, secure increased benefits, and reduce their own jealousy.

== Friendship jealousy in non-human animals ==
The occurrence of friendship jealousy in non-human animals is an area of growing research interest. Many animals, such as chimpanzees, monkeys, dolphins, horses, elephants, and hyenas, are known to form long-lasting friendships. As such, it is unsurprising that non-human animals are also vulnerable to friendship jealousy. Various empirical research studies have reported evidence of jealousy in animals, including Titi and Rhesus monkeys, macaques, and even dogs.

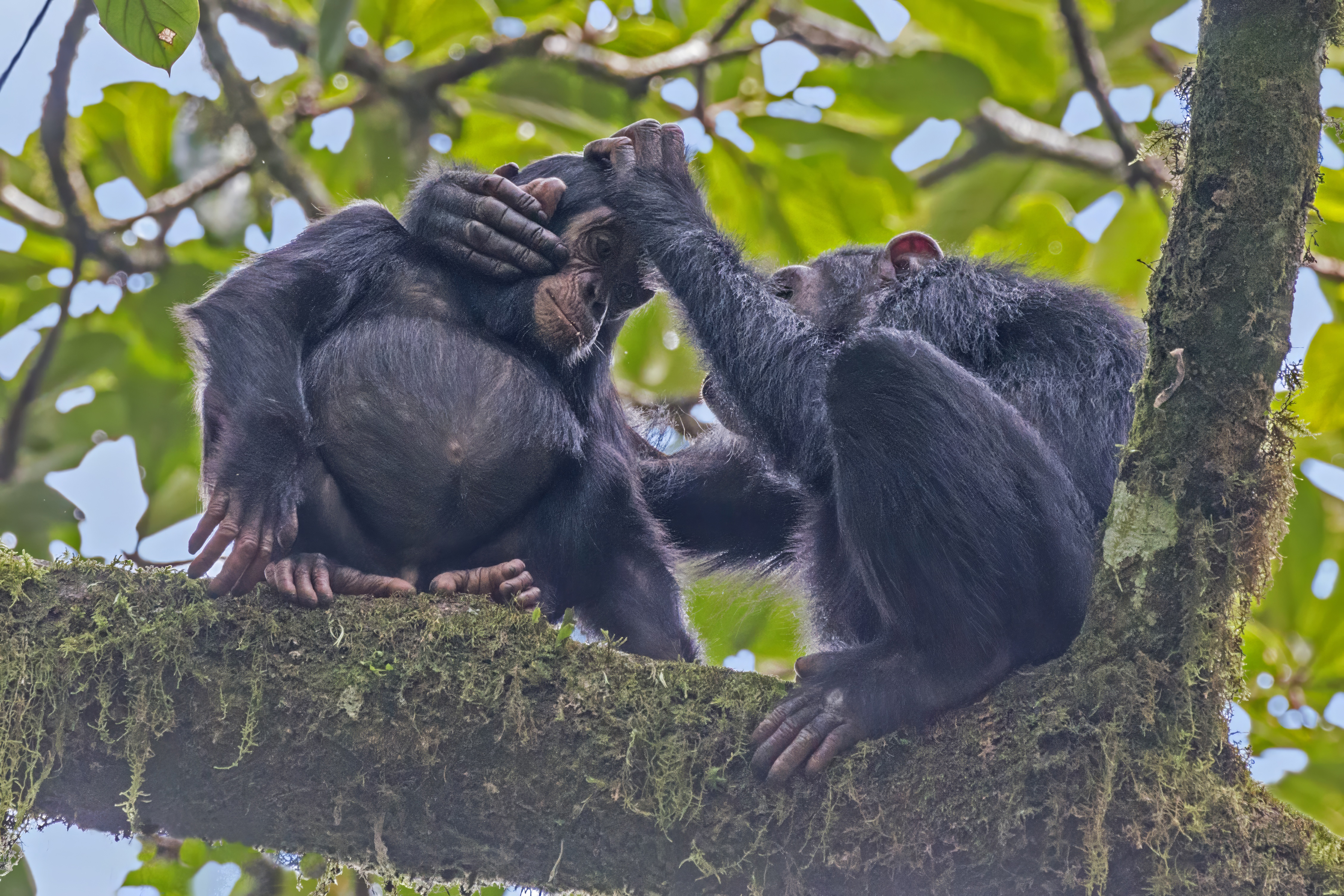
Chimpanzees are known to form long-term friendships and show signs of jealousy.

Relevant methodological approaches include using neuroimaging and behavioral observations to infer animals' internal experiences of jealousy (e.g., increased activation of the amygdala, and separation, monopolization, and direct competitor aggression tactics indicate possible jealousy evocation). Chimpanzees, one of human's closest genetic relatives, have been found to engage in social exclusion and indirect competitor aggression tactics through coalition-building or by targeting rival's reputations. However, the majority of this research has investigated non-human animal displays of mate jealousy. More research is needed to evaluate predictors of and behaviors arising from friendship jealousy in various species across the animal kingdom.

== Consequences of friendship jealousy ==
=== Negative outcomes ===
Many modern cultures view jealousy in a negative light. As such, there exist social pressures which discourage people from both experiencing and expressing it. Furthermore, jealousy is generally seen as less acceptable in the context of friendships when compared to romantic or sexual relationships. In research investigating the principles which govern friendship, avoiding jealousy of a friend's other relationships has been identified as a basic rule. When an individual does experience friendship jealousy, they are likely to feel shame as a result of the social pressures and stigma associated with the emotion.

Internal consequences are not the only negative outcomes associated with friendship jealousy. Social demotion and alienation, and, in some cases, complete friendship dissolution might also occur. For example, friendship jealousy might drive an individual to engage in certain behaviors (e.g., surveillance, manipulation, derogation, and physical violence), that have the potential to cause permanent destruction to their friendship.

=== Positive outcomes ===
Although friendship jealousy is often perceived as a negative phenomenon, it can also produce positive effects. For example, expressing jealousy in a situationally appropriate, prosocial way can signal to an individual that they are highly valued by their friend, to the extent that their friend cares deeply enough to preserve and protect the friendship from outside interference. Experiencing jealousy can also motivate self-improvement in the affected individual.

Engaging in certain covert friend guarding behaviors may allow individuals to mitigate third-party threats whilst avoiding negative social consequences. In jealous adolescents, for example, higher self-reported friendship jealousy has been found to be correlated with higher reports of proactive prosocial behavior. Proactive prosocial behavior differs from typical prosocial behavior due to its associations with aggressive cognitions and explicit motivations or objectives.

In summary, strategically covert or situationally appropriate friendship jealousy behaviors can be effective in reaffirming one's friendship status and thwarting one's rivals.

== Relevant psychological frameworks ==
=== Developmental psychology ===
==== Stages of development ====
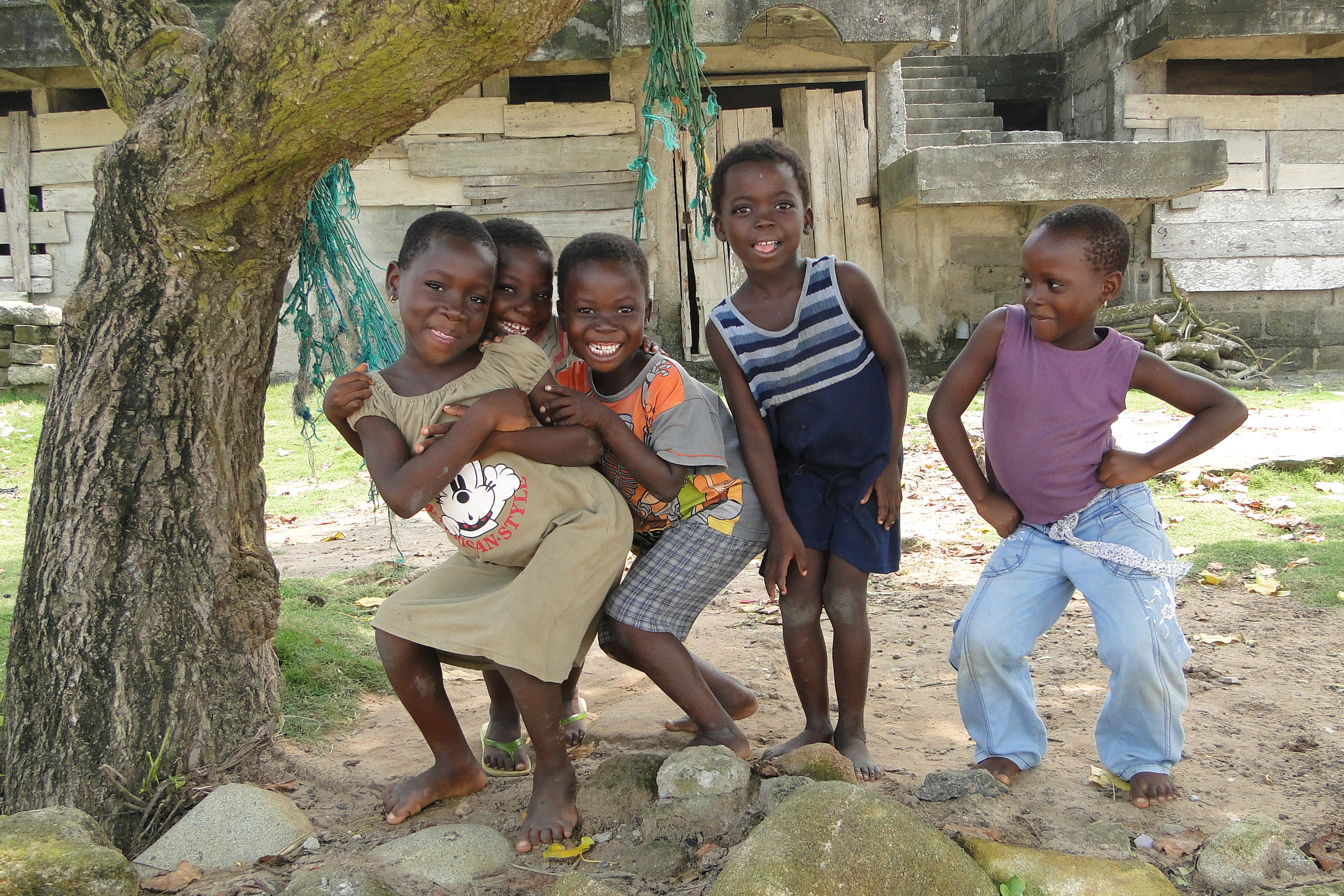
Young children may not be as likely to experience friendship jealousy.

An individual's vulnerability to jealousy is expected to fluctuate across the stages of development. For example, in early stages, individuals are expected to feel and express jealousy less frequently due to the level of socio-cognitive awareness required to perceive third-parties as potential threats to one's own friendships. According to Piaget's theory of cognitive development, young children are egocentric – meaning that they lack advanced social perspective-taking and theory of mind, or the ability to understand that other people have their own cognitions, emotions, and perspectives. This feature of the preoperational stage of cognitive development thereby contributes to reduced friendship jealousy. Later, the frequency with which individuals experience friendship jealousy is expected to increase in late childhood, when socio-cognitive awareness is more developed, decrease as children enter adolescence, increase after middle adolescence, and abate after adolescence, when individuals' socio-cognitive capabilities mature.

According to Erikson's stages of psychosocial development, adolescents are faced with the crisis of identity vs. role confusion, during which they seek to establish a stable sense of self. The next stage, intimacy vs. isolation, begins in early adulthood, and is marked by the formation of long-term relationships, whether romantic or platonic in nature. Young adults might struggle to resist blending their identity with the identities of close-others, and when a third-party interferes with a close bond, the individual may isolate themselves and destroy the bonds which cause them pain. In alignment with this framework, friendship jealousy is likely to be especially prevalent and damaging during these developmental stages. It should be noted, however, that friendship jealousy may also play a pivotal role in later adulthood, as aging populations may need to rely more heavily on social bonds for physical and emotional assistance.

==== Self-determination theory ====
Self-determination theory posits that humans have three basic psychological needs that must be met in order to promote motivation, personal growth, and well-being: autonomy, competence, and relatedness. Friendship rivals threaten the satisfaction of these needs; thus, jealousy may arise in order to motivate actions aimed at restoring essential need fulfillment.

==== Attachment theory ====
Attachment theory, another major contribution of developmental psychology to the larger field, is an additional highly relevant framework through which one can examine friendship jealousy. As explained above, people who have developed anxious attachment styles are more likely to experience friendship jealousy than people with other forms of attachment. This might be due to the fact that securely attached individuals perceive friendships as more stable, while avoidantly attached individuals may put significant conscious or unconscious effort into suppressing the jealousy they experience.

=== Social psychology ===
==== Comparison theories ====
Self-evaluation maintenance theory can help explain why people tend to experience greater jealousy when their rival outperforms them on particular dimensions. Social comparison theory similarly suggests that people evaluate themselves and their social prowess with respect to the performance, qualities, and capabilities of others. When upward social comparisons are performed with a rival in mind, for example, replacement threat might increase, resulting in friendship jealousy.

==== Social exchange theories ====
According to social exchange theory, social behavior is an exchange process whereby individuals interact with the expectation of receiving rewards or benefits. Furthermore, people seek to maximize their benefits and minimize their costs when engaging in social interactions and forming social bonds; the most optimal relationship will be one in which benefits are mutually rewarding and costs are outweighed. Interdependence theory, a type of social exchange theory, incorporates considerations of mutual dependence – in other words, to what extent the dyadic partners rely on one another. Friendship jealousy, viewed through the lens of social exchange theory, is likely to occur when there is a discrepancy in the relative benefits allocated to the dyadic partners due to third-party interference.

==== Social identity theory ====
Social identity theory describes the social forces which drive an individual to claim membership in a particular social group, as well as the behaviors resulting from the establishment of discrete social groups. In accordance with this theory, friendships are most likely to be formed when potential dyadic partners share a central dimension of identity or are part of the same social group. In other words, there might exist social forces which motivate the formation of same-sex, same-race, and same-religion friendships, for example. However, once a friendship is formed, if the identity or group membership of a rival overlaps to a greater extent with the identity or group membership of one's friend, a cascade of consequences is likely to occur: replacement threat is increased, friendship jealousy is experienced, and the individual will engage in friendship jealousy behaviors.

=== Evolutionary psychology ===
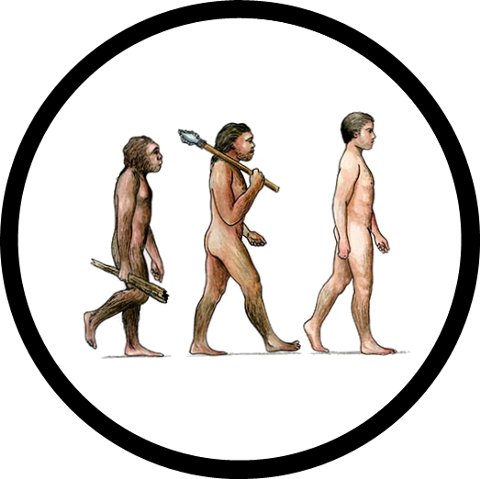
Friendship jealousy might have evolved in humans as a tool to protect valuable alliances, maintain group cohesion, and ensure survival and reproductive fitness.

==== The alliance hypothesis ====
The alliance hypothesis for human friendship states that the evolutionary pressures faced by ancestral humans designed certain cognitive mechanisms which drive humans to identify and secure allies in preparation for future conflict; thus, modern humans are motivated to find and make friends. Relatedly, researchers studying emotion from a functional or adaptationist standpoint argue that friendship jealousy arises when a valued friendship is threatened due to the risk of losing access to the survival and reproductive fitness benefits they provide. The jealousy experienced then motivates the individual to leverage a suite of friend-retention tactics which have evolved alongside friendship jealousy due to their ability to effectively mitigate friendship threats and secure valuable resources.

==== Reciprocal altruism ====
Many evolutionary psychologists believe that reciprocal altruism evolved in humans because individuals who help others are more likely to receive future reciprocation, thus increasing their survival and reproductive fitness. Reciprocity, it is argued, ensures the strength and maintenance of alliances; perceived imbalances or reciprocity violations can lead to jealousy. Social identity theory is also relevant here, since preferential in-group treatment has several evolutionary implications. For example, friends and family are part of a person's in-group; thus, individuals might be motivated to extend preferential treatment, protection, and benefit provisioning to the offspring of their friends. By doing so, the individual is able to ensure future reciprocity for themselves and their own offspring.

==== Group selection theory ====
Group selection theory suggests that certain qualities or traits might evolve not necessarily for the benefit of the individual, but to benefit the overall group that individual belongs to – even at the individual's direct expense. Although friendship jealousy has the potential to negatively impact the emotional well-being and social status of the individual, it might have evolved to protect and maintain the larger structure of the social group. A single ancestral human might have been able to mitigate threats to group cohesion resulting from the strengthening of unprecedented social bonds by engaging in jealousy behaviors, even if the consequences of those behaviors were detrimental to their own survival and reproductive fitness.

==== Costly signaling theory ====
Costly signaling theory – which states that individuals may engage in behaviors that are costly in order to signal their authenticity and commitment – offers a framework through which we can examine displays of friendship jealousy. Because friendship jealousy and its associated behaviors carry negative consequences, such as social stigma, resource expenditure, emotional vulnerability, and friendship dissolution, people are unlikely to feign the experience of jealousy without genuine concern for the friendship at hand. As a result, friends are more likely to believe the individual's experience is sincere and respond positively to it, and the individual is able to effectively and accurately signal the value they place on the friendship. In alignment with this framework, the more costly the signal, the more valuable the friendship is likely to be to the individual. Thus, friendship jealousy may be understood as an effective tool used to preserve social bonds.
