= Veenhoven =

Veenhoven is a Dutch surname. Notable people with the surname include:

- Jacobine Veenhoven (born 1984), Dutch rower
- Ruut Veenhoven (1942–2024), Dutch sociologist
