= Marié Wissing =

South African clinical psychologist

Marié Philliphina Wissing is a South African clinical psychologist, who is a professor at the Africa Unit for Transdisciplinary Health Research (AUTHeR) at the North-West University in South Africa. She became a member of the Academy of Science of South Africa in 2018.

== Life and work ==
Wissing’s past research has primarily concerned two projects (FORT3 & Eudaimonic-Hedonic Happiness Investigation), both of which focus on clarifying the nature and facets of psychosocial well-being, validation of "well-being measures in various contexts, exploration of similarities and differences across socio-demographic, cultural and international contexts, and reflection on theories and underlying philosophical assumptions and now specializing in research on meaning, goals and relatedness in local and international projects."

She has concluded that certain core assumptions and research findings (often part of "main stream Western positive psychology") do not apply elsewhere in the world and that the measuring instruments used by Western researchers are insensitive at high levels of well-being. To pursue such research, Wissing is a core leader of the international multi-country EHHI project. She is also the leader of the FORT research programme and the psychosocial health and the "dynamics and relationships with biomarkers of (ill) health in South African Social contexts."

She has participated in several other multi-disciplinary research projects (including THUSA, PURE, SOPP, POWIRS, FLAGH, SABPA).

Wissing is a member of the Advisory Council of the International Positive Psychology Association.

== Selected publications ==
=== Editor ===
Wissing has edited a volume on Well-being Research in South Africa, and to which she also contributed several chapters. She has been a guest editor for the Journal of Psychology. She has also served on the editorial boards of several disciplinary journals and is an associate editor of the international multi-disciplinary Journal of Happiness Studies.

=== Author ===
- Roothman, B., Kirsten, D. K., & Wissing, M. P. (2003). Gender differences in aspects of psychological well-being. South African journal of psychology, 33(4), 212-218.
- Wissing, M. P., & Van Eeden, C. (2002). Empirical clarification of the nature of psychological well-being. South African Journal of Psychology, 32(1), 32-44.
- Joshanloo, M., Wissing, M. P., Khumalo, I. P., & Lamers, S. M. (2013). Measurement invariance of the Mental Health Continuum-Short Form (MHC-SF) across three cultural groups. Personality and Individual Differences, 55(7), 755-759.
