= Ruut Veenhoven =

Dutch sociologist (1942–2024)

- Born: 26 November 1942; The Hague, German-occupied Netherlands
- Died: 9 December 2024 (aged 82); Netherlands
- Occupation: Sociologist
- Title: Full professor of social conditions for human Happiness at Erasmus University Rotterdam (2000-2007). Special Professor, North-West University (2011-2024); Extraordinary Professor of Humanism, Utrecht University (1995–2002)

Academic background
- Education: Nederlandsch Lyceum
- Alma mater: Erasmus University Rotterdam (M.S.) (Ph.D.)
- Thesis: The Conditions of Happiness (1984)

Academic work
- Discipline: Sociologist
- Sub-discipline: Sociology research
- Institutions: Erasmus University Rotterdam; North-West University
- Main interests: Happiness
- Notable works: World Database of Happiness; Journal of Happiness Studies

Ruut Veenhoven (26 November 1942 – 9 December 2024) was a Dutch sociologist and a pioneer on the scientific study of happiness, in the sense of subjective enjoyment of life. His work on the social conditions for human happiness at Erasmus University Rotterdam in the Netherlands contributed to a renewed interest in happiness as an aim for public policy. He showed that happiness can be used a reliable measure to assess progress in societies which was one of the sources of inspiration for the United Nations to adopt happiness measures as a holistic approach to development. Veenhoven was the founding director of the World Database of Happiness and a founding editor of the Journal of Happiness Studies. He was described as "the godfather of happiness studies", and "a leading authority on worldwide levels of happiness from country to country", whose work "earned him international acclaim".

== Biography ==
Veenhoven was born in The Hague, Netherlands on 26 November 1942. He graduated from the Nederlandsch Lyceum in The Hague in 1962 and received a master's degree in sociology, specializing in public management, from Erasmus University Rotterdam in 1969. Subsequently, he completed a PhD in social sciences also at Erasmus, with a dissertation on The Conditions of Happiness. He was also registered as a social-sexologist from 1994 to 2000. Between 1970 and 1990, Veenhoven was a leading advocate of abortion law reform and in promoting acceptance of voluntary childlessness in The Netherlands.

In 1995 he was appointed professor of Humanism at Utrecht University and in 2000 he became professor of social conditions for human Happiness at Erasmus University Rotterdam. From 2011, he was a special professor at North-West University in South Africa. After his retirement in 2007, he joined the Erasmus Happiness Economics Research Organization (EHERO). From 1985, he was the director of the World Database of Happiness at Erasmus University Rotterdam. From 1995 until 2002, he was extraordinary professor of humanism at the Utrecht University in the Netherlands. His contribution to the field of happiness studies was described in the Festschrift The Pope of Happiness.

In 1984, Veenhoven earned his doctorate on the dissertation Conditions of Happiness that synthesized the results of 245 empirical studies on happiness. On that basis, he developed the World Database of Happiness, which now covers some 40,000 research findings taken from 8,000 empirical investigations. Veenhoven was mentioned in the top 5% of authors in his field in December 2012.

Veenhoven was diagnosed with multiple myeloma in 2019. In 2021, he said he had already made preparations for euthanasia. Veenhoven died at home in the Netherlands, on 9 December 2024, at the age of 82.

== Awards ==
The International Society for Quality of Life Studies (ISQOLS) awarded Veenhoven several times:

- 1997: Research Fellow Award
- 2000: Best Annual SIR Paper Award
- 2001: Distinguished QOL Researcher Award
- 2009: Best Annual JOHS Paper Award
- 2012: Distinguished Service Award
- 2021: Award for the Betterment of the Human Condition (for The World Database of Happiness)

== Research on happiness ==
His main research subject was happiness in the sense of subjective enjoyment of life. His main aim was to add to happiness for as many people as possible, by allowing individuals and organizations to make better informed decisions. Worldwide, he was seen as a pioneer in that field.

- His main findings are:
  - Happiness is universal. All humans tend to assess how much they like the life they live and conditions for happiness are quite similar. Yet there is some cultural variation in beliefs about happiness. Happiness draws on gratification of universal needs, rather than on meeting culturally relative wants.
  - Need gratification depends both on the livability of society and the life-ability of individuals.
  - Greater happiness of a greater number is possible in contemporary societies and can be "engineered", among other things in the following ways:
    - Fostering freedom, so that people can choose the way of life that fits them best.
    - Informing people about effects of major choices on the happiness of people like them. This requires large scale long-term follow-up studies comparable to research in nutrition.
    - Investing in mental health, professionalization of life-coaching.
  - Happiness signals that we are functioning well and for that reason happiness goes hand-in-hand with good health, both mental and physical. Happy people live longer.
  - Being happy combines well with doing good. Happier people do better in relationships, do more voluntary work and are more interested in other people and their problems.
