= Journal of Happiness Studies =

- Subject: Happiness, positive psychology
- Language: English
- Edited by: Antonella Delle Fave

Publication details
- History: 2000–present
- Publisher: Springer Science+Business Media
- Open access: Hybrid
- Impact factor: 3.852 (2020)

Standard abbreviations
- ISO 4: J. Happiness Stud.

Indexing
- CODEN: JHSOAA
- ISSN: 1389-4978
- OCLC no.: 780954586

Links
- Journal homepage; Online archive

The Journal of Happiness Studies: An Interdisciplinary Forum on Subjective Well-Being is a peer-reviewed interdisciplinary scientific journal covering the study of happiness and well-being. It was established in 2000 by founding editors Ed Diener, Alex Michalos, and Ruut Veenhoven. It is published by Springer Science+Business Media, and is affiliated with the International Society for Quality of Life Studies (ISQOLS). The editor-in-chief is Antonella Delle Fave (University of Milan). According to the Journal Citation Reports, the journal has a 2020 impact factor of 3.852.
