= World Database of Happiness =

Archive on subjective appreciation of life

The World Database of Happiness is a web-based archive of research findings on subjective appreciation of life, based in the Erasmus Happiness Economics Research Organization of the Erasmus University Rotterdam in The Netherlands. The database contains both an overview of scientific publications on happiness and a digest of research findings. Happiness is defined as the degree to which an individual judges the quality of his or her life as a whole favorably. Two 'components' of happiness are distinguished: hedonic level of affect (the degree to which pleasant affect dominates) and contentment (perceived realization of wants).

== Aims ==
The World Database of Happiness is a tool to quickly acquire an overview on the ever-growing stream of research findings on happiness Medio 2023 the database covered some 16,000 scientific publications on happiness, from which were extracted 23,000 distributional findings (on how happy people are) and another 24,000 correlational findings (on factors associated with more and less happiness). The first findings date from 1915.

== Technique ==
The World Database of Happiness is a ‘findings archive’, which consists of electronic ‘finding pages’ on which separate research results are described in a standard format and terminology. These finding pages can be selected on various characteristics, such as population studies, the measure of happiness used and observed co-variates. All finding-pages have a specific internet address to which links can be made in scientific review papers or policy recommendations. This allows a concise presentation of many findings in a table, while providing readers with access to detail.

== Scientific use ==
The Database has been cited in 254 scientific papers, for example to access under what conditions economic growth enhances average happiness or to show that rising mean happiness at first raises happiness inequality, but further rise will diminish these differences, or that healthy eating is associated with more happiness, even after controlling for the effect on health Another finding is that relative simple happiness training techniques raise happiness by some 5%

== Popular use ==
The World Database of Happiness is often used by popular media to make lists of the happiest countries around the globe. An example is the Happy Planet Index, which aims to chart sustainable happiness all over the world by combining data on longevity, happiness and the size of the ecological footprint of citizens.

== Strengths and weaknesses ==
The database has a clear conceptual focus, it includes only research findings on subjective enjoyment of one's life as a whole. Thereby it evades the Babel that has haunted the study of happiness for ages. The other side of that coin is that much interesting research is left out. The findings are reported with technical details about measurement and statistical analysis. This detail is welcomed by scholars, but makes the information difficult to digest for lay-persons. Still another limitation is that the determinants of happiness appear to vary considerably across persons and situations, which make it hard to draw general conclusions about the causes of happiness. What is clear is that poor health, separation, unemployment and lack of social contact are all strongly negatively associated with happiness. Another problem for the World database of happiness is that the studies on happiness increase with such a high rate that it gets increasingly difficult to offer a complete overview of all research findings. A further concern is that the Database of Happiness is exclusively focused on hedonic happiness (feeling good) and not on mature happiness that might exist in the face of suffering
