= Reciprocal altruism in humans =

Aspect of sociology and behavior

Reciprocal altruism in humans refers to an individual behavior that gives benefit conditionally upon receiving a returned benefit, which draws on the economic concept – ″gains in trade″. Human reciprocal altruism would include the following behaviors (but is not limited to): helping patients, the wounded, and the others when they are in crisis; sharing food, implement, knowledge.

== Overview ==
The term ″altruism″ was firstly coined by the French philosopher Auguste Comte in the 19th century, which was derived from the French word ″altruisme″. Comte believed that altruism is a moral doctrine, which is the opposite of egoism, emphasizing the noble morality of sacrificing themselves and benefiting others. Human beings have both selfish and altruistic motivations, and altruism is used to restrain the egoistical instinct. Comte's altruism describes the nature of human and ethical significance, but it's completely different from the altruism in biological sciences. In evolutionary biology, altruism is an individual behavior that benefits another individual's fitness but reduces their own fitness in population. The concept of ″altruism″ in biology arose from the debate of ″the Problem of Altruism″ in Natural Selection. Charles Darwin suggested that animals behave in the ways that can increase their survival and reproductive chances while competing with others. However, altruistic behavior – the act of helping others even if it accompanies with a personal cost – is common in the animal kingdom, like the vampire bat and various primates. Therefore, Charles Darwin regarded ″the Problem of Altruism″ as a potential fatal challenge to his concept of natural selection. In ″The Descent of Man″, Darwin (1859) wrote:

He who was ready to sacrifice his life, as many a savage has been, rather than betray his comrades, would often leave no offspring to inherit his noble nature.

In 1964, William Hamilton developed mathematical model and put forward to his theory – ″Kin selection″ theory or ″inclusive fitness″ theory reveals that an altruistic gene evolved by natural selection. The gene can be only shared with relatives, and reduces the individuals own fitness but boosts the fitness of their relatives and off-springs. In this way, this behavior increases the proportion of altruistic gene in population. Hamilton's rule provides mathematical inequality to state that an altruistic gene spread by natural selection only if the following condition can be satisfied: r B > C, where C is the cost to the individual performing the altruistic act, B is the benefit gained by the recipients of the altruistic act, r is the genetic relatedness between individual and recipients.

Hamilton's ″Kin selection″ theory expands the Darwinian definition of ″fitness″ and continues the same Darwinian framework that allows the spread of not only selfish genes but also altruistic genes. Nevertheless, Hamilton's theory did not support an appropriate explanation with unrelated members of other species. In order to solve this problem, Robert Trivers developed the original theory of reciprocal altruism into an attempt to explain the altruism behaviors among unrelated organisms. The idea of reciprocal altruism is straightforward: an altruistic behavior is probably selected only if a return would be obtained in the future. It is similar to the Tit-for-Tat strategy from game theory.

The theory of reciprocal altruism in humanity, based on the biological characteristics of human beings and the realistic society, explicates the interdependence and cooperation between people, as well as its rationality. It also demonstrates the original motivations and the internal mechanisms of the human cooperation, revealing the inevitability and social significance ranging from kin altruism to un-relative altruism in the human population. As a result, the subjective guess and emotion of human cooperation can be refined to a theory, and is gradually become one of the most popular explanations to a variety of social behaviors. In addition, cooperation is the most deep-seated foundation for the formation and existence of human society. Therefore, the proposition of reciprocal altruism is undoubtedly a great theoretical advance in human cognition history.

Human reciprocal altruism seems to be a huge magnetic field to interweave different disciplines closely. New exploration has been made by these disciplines at different levels from different points. Generally, the core of Human reciprocal altruism is located in the puzzle: How to overcome short-term self-interest and achieve cooperation. Ultimately, it reveals that altruistic individuals are more competitive than selfish individuals, on either improving individual fitness or resolving conflicts. The compatibility and complementarity of different theoretical perspectives lay the basis of human reciprocal altruism, and help with exploring human different viewpoints of human reciprocal altruism. The debate of human reciprocal altruism has been the focus of biology, sociology, economics and culture.

== Scientific viewpoints ==
=== Biology ===
In 1902, Peter Kropotkin published his monograph – Mutual Aid: A Factor of Evolution, and demonstrates the survival mechanisms of cooperation, based on various examples of animal and human societies. He attempted to reveal that the law of biological evolution is mutual aid rather than survival competition. Mutual aid and cooperation are the principles of all species’ biological evolution including human beings’, and the concepts resulting in a profound influence upon biological evolution. E.O. Wilson applied the term of ″sociobiology″ as an attempt to explain social behavior of insect and thus explored the evolutionary mechanism of other animals including human such as the social behavior, altruism. He argued that human altruistic behavior, as one of the human nature characteristics, is the result of the genetic inheritance.

In 1971, Trivers published one of the most important biological articles of the 20th century - The Evolution of Reciprocal Altruism and introduced the term of ″reciprocal altruism″ to explain the evolution of cooperation. The idea of reciprocal altruism is almost the same as kin selection, except to put emphasis on reciprocation instead of the need for genetic relatedness. It described that an altruistic trait or behavior may be selected, because the recipient will very likely to return benefits to the altruistic sender. If the reproductive benefit that the altruistic sender receives in return is larger than the cost initially incurred by the altruistic action, individuals who engage in this kind of reciprocal altruism will outbreed those who do not. Therefore, a seemingly altruistic trait can spread in a population. The reciprocation can be delayed as long as the individuals stay in the trade, and, so to speak, have sufficient long-term memory. This explains many features of human social life, for example, we do a favor for someone with the expectation that the favor would be remembered, and lead to a return in the future.

As Trivers supported the foundation for reciprocal altruism, Axelrod and Hamilton applied the Game Theory to study the mechanism of reciprocal altruism, and attempted to answer the key question: How altruism spreads when cheating is an all-win strategy used by members of the population. In this paper, Axelrod and Hamilton revealed that reciprocating the assistance from another individual is stable in evolution as long as there are enough altruists in the population. They also demonstrate that a population of altruists can initially emerge through inclusive fitness, helping and receiving help among genetically related individuals. Subsequent work indicates that only a few altruists are initially needed for the emergence of reciprocation in a heterogeneous population.

Some evolutionary biologists, like Richard Dawkins, wholly endorse Axelrod and Hamilton's work in individual selection. In describing genes as being selfish, Dawkins states that the organisms act altruistically against their individual interests in order to help copies of themselves in other bodies to replicate. Essentially, reciprocal altruism is the individual behavior behind selfish motivations. The bird is a prime example in the narrative of Dawkins: those altruistic birds who sacrifice their own interests by reproducing late or less during hard times would not have been able to pass their altruistic genes to the future generations, which will be dominated by the selfish genes from birds who take advantage of the situation by using up others’ food supply to reproduce their own offspring. Nevertheless, some scholars such as K. Lorenz and W. Edwards have been strongly opposed to the individual selection. In contrast, they spearhead the campaign of group selection.

The debate whether individuals/gene or group/species are the basic level/unit of selection has occurred since the 1960s. The major idea of group selection is that individuals may sacrifice their own reproductive interests for the benefit of the survival of the group to which they belong. W. Edwards builds this argument mainly on birth related behaviors of birds. He points out that many bird species with small clutches have prolonged periods before reaching reproductive maturity, and have long breeding seasons sometimes in excess of one year. Other group selection supporters also argue that these behaviors must be social and altruistic in that, for example, when food supply is abundant, clutches are bigger than when food supply is more scarce. Birds thus can regulate their population densities below starvation levels through social conventions. All of these characteristics run contrary to the idea that fitness is defined by individual organisms attempting to selfishly reproduce. However, it soon became clear that group selection was losing the battle. In 1966, George Williams published the influential Adaptation and Natural Selection: a critique of some current evolutionary thought. By the end of the 1960s, a Neo-Darwinian interpretation of the modern synthesis had taken hold and it has become almost a gold standard that the unit of evolutionary analysis is at the individual's and the gene's level. Dawkins, Hamilton, and Trivers represent the mainstream view of individual selection.

=== Sociology ===
Some scholars, such as Michael Taylor, Anatol Rapoport, Robert Keohane, Arthur Stein, Helen Milner and Kennth Oye, point out that reciprocal altruism widely spread in international relations and human society, and international reciprocity is the foundation of the international community. States act in the confidence that their cooperative actions will be repaid in the long term instead of seeking for the immediate benefit, so reciprocal altruism can be seen as generally accepted standards in international relations. On a personal scale, some scholars believe that reciprocal altruism derives from the subjective feeling of individuals and compliance with social rules. Smith put forward an alternative based on the idea of sympathy and indicates that altruistic behavior is the product of the measure of gains and losses, emphasizing that people are easy to compare with others when measuring the gains and losses. Due to this, the subjective sense of fairness exerts an effect on people's altruistic behavior. For humans, social norms can be argued to reduce individual level variation and competition, thus shifting selection to the group level, so human behavior should be consistent with social norms. Altruistic behavior is the result of learning and internalizing these social norms by individuals.

=== Economy ===
==== Economic model ====
The economic model of reciprocal altruism includes direct reciprocity and indirect reciprocity. Direct reciprocity is an immediate collaborative exchange that benefits everyone. Direct reciprocity was introduced by Robert Trivers as a mechanism for the evolution of cooperation. The direct reciprocal is typically one-for-one: I incur the cost today to benefit you, you incur the cost at some point later on to benefit me. There is little negotiation and the exchange is simple. The strategy of ″the prisoner's dilemma″ is the common direct reciprocity.

The Prisoner's Dilemma requires that:

temptation to defect (T=+5) > reward for mutual cooperation(R=+3) > being a sucker (S=-2)

and that:

reward for mutual cooperation (R=+3) > (T+S)/2.

There is immediate and obvious benefit from direct reciprocity and relatively little need for trust into the future. Cheating is a critical question and may happen at some time.

In the context of Indirect reciprocity, two players are randomly selected in a population, one is donor while the other is recipient. Each player can play many times, but never with the same partner twice. Thus it is impossible that a cheat is held to account by the victim. Obviously, trigger strategies can ensure a cooperative Nash equilibrium. If all players use these strategies, no player would have deviated. In many situations, cooperation is favored and it even benefits an individual to forgive a defection but cooperative societies are always unstable because mutants which are inclined to defect may lose any balance. In addition, Indirect reciprocity typifies two forms: ″Upstream reciprocity″ and ″Downstream reciprocity″. In the description of "Figure1. Direct and indirect reciprocity", Nowak and Sigmund provided the explicit identifications of ″Upstream reciprocity″ and ″Downstream reciprocity″:

Upstream reciprocity is based on a recent positive experience. A person who has been at the receiving end of a donation may feel motivated to donate in turn. Individual B, who has just received help from A, goes on to help C. ‘Downstream reciprocity’ is built on reputation. Individual A has helped B and therefore receives help from C. Mathematical investigations of indirect reciprocity have shown that natural selection can favor strategies that help others based on their reputation. Upstream reciprocity is harder to understand but is observed in economic experiments. In both cases, the decision to help can be interpreted as a misdirected act of gratitude. In one case recipients are thanked for what another did; in the other case they are thanked by someone who did not profit by what they did".(p. 1292.)

==== Utility function ====
Utility function is an important concept in economy that measures preferences over a set of goods and services using mathematics. In general, a utility function U (X, Y) will represent a consumer's preferences for different goods if the following condition holds:

U(A) > U(B) if and only if A is preferred to B.

Economists, such as Gary S. Becker, use the theory of utility function and establish the hypothesis of altruism model. Becker argues that the donor's utility function includes the utility of potential recipients. That is, the donor would donate a resource if the vicarious enjoyment of watching the pleasure of others exceeds at the margin the donor's satisfaction from consuming the resource himself. He indicates that all human behaviors are the maximization of different utility functions, and attempts to establish all human behaviors on the basis of generalized utility theory with resource constraints. He also puts the human irrational behavior into the framework of this analysis, emphasizing that human altruistic behavior can be defined by the generalized utility function appropriately.

==== Game theory ====
Game theory, especially the prisoner's dilemma, is originally introduced by Trivers to explain the mechanism of reciprocal altruism. Unlike Hamilton's inclusive fitness where the selection of an altruistic allele is ″secured″ by the extent of genetic relatedness between the donor and recipient, reciprocation is no guarantee and, in fact, cheating or not reciprocating is evolutionarily stable because cheaters are doubly rewarded reproductively. That is, they receive a benefit from helpers and, at the same time, helpers bear a cost for the cheaters, although the cost is smaller than the benefit.

The relationship between donor and recipient in reciprocal altruism is exactly analogous to the situation of the prisoner's dilemma. In Triver's narrative, the prisoner's dilemma can be characterized by the following payoff matrix:

| | A_{2} | C_{2} |
| A_{1} | R, R | S, T |
| C_{1} | T, S | P, P |

Where A_{1} and A_{2} are the individuals’ altruistic acts and C_{1}, C_{2} are the cheating acts, and where T represents the temptation to defect, R represents the reward for mutual cooperation and S stands for being a sucker.

And the following inequality must hold for reciprocal altruism:

S < P < R < T.

The Prisoner's dilemma becomes the classical example to understand the reciprocal altruism. Combining the theory of biological evolution with classical game theory, Maynard Smith and George. R. Price explained how selfish individuals can achieve cooperation and develop the basic equilibrium concept in evolutionary - Evolutionarily Stable Strategy (ESS). Evolutionarily Stable Strategy is a strategy and adopted by a population in a given environment. An ESS is an equilibrium refinement of the Nash equilibrium that once it is fixed in a population, natural selection alone is sufficient to prevent alternative strategies from invading successfully. Simultaneously, the collaboration between Axelrod and Hamilton is also significant for applying game theory to evolutionary issues. Their paper and the book Evolution and the theory of games, written by John Maynard, illustrate that the process of natural selection can be mathematically modeled using game theory. In essence, natural selection entails differential replication of genes. That is, different traits and attributes are selected for or against because of the different effects they have on their ″own″ genetic reproduction or replication. The differential replication process, independent of its underlying nature being biological, physiological, or psychological, can be approximated by game theory. Different game-theoretical strategies have imbedded probabilistic functions that result in their winning or losing a game, similar to the selecting - for or selecting - against of genes.

The strategy of game theory discussed in Axelrod and Hamilton's paper is called Tit for Tat. Tit for Tat represents such a strategy that, in a repeated game, the player starts by not telling on the other player or cooperates and subsequently reciprocates the same action undertaken by the other player. That is, the player cooperates if the other player cooperates and defects if the other player defects. As a game theoretical strategy, Tit for Tat essentially entails the same concept as Trivers' reciprocal altruism. Unlike Trivers' original publication which provides conceptual explanations and examples, Axelrod and Hamilton's paper provides more rigorous mathematical proofs of the viability or ESS of reciprocal altruism.

=== Culture ===
D. S. Wilson and E. O. Wilson stated that the speed and function of "gene evolution" in human society is far less than that of "cultural evolution", but these two elements interact, thus they achieve the evolution of human altruism. To further illustrate this mechanism, Dawkins proposed the concept of ″Meme″ in his book The selfish gene. ″Meme″ refers to ″an idea, behavior, or style that spreads from person to person within a culture″. It is seen as the basic unit of culture that can be transmitted from one mind to another. Susan Blackmore is one of the scholars that has made contributions to the theory of ″Meme″. Blackmore insisted that memes are the medium of the spread of altruism. The transmission of altruism has been carried out through memes. Memes are true evolutionary replicators like genetics and undergo evolutionary change.
