= Eileen Kennedy-Moore =

American psychologist, author

Eileen Kennedy-Moore is an American clinical psychologist and the author or co-author of books for parents, children, and mental health professionals. She serves on the advisory board for Parents magazine and blogs about children's feelings and friendships on PsychologyToday.com. She has also blogged for PBS Parents and U.S. News & World Report. She is the creator of Dr. Friendtastic, a cartoon superhero offering friendship advice for kids.

== Education ==
Kennedy-Moore earned her bachelor's degree at Northwestern University and her masters and doctorate at Stony Brook University (State University of New York at Stony Brook). Her academic publications include articles in Review of General Psychology, Motivation and Emotion, and Journal of Personality and Social Psychology.

== Books and videos ==
- Expressing Emotion: Myths, Realities and Therapeutic Strategies, ISBN 978-1-572-30694-3. Kennedy-Moore, E. & Watson, J. C. (1999). Guilford Press (for mental health professionals)
- The Unwritten Rules of Friendship: Simple Strategies to Help Your Children Make Friends, ISBN 978-0-316-91730-8. Elman, N. M. & Kennedy-Moore, E. (2003), Little, Brown (for parents)
- What About Me? 12 Ways to Get Your Parents' Attention (Without Hitting Your Sister), ISBN 978-1-884-73486-1. Kennedy-Moore, E. & Katayama, M. (illus.) (2005), Parenting Press (for children ages 4–6)
- Smart Parenting for Smart Kids: Nurturing Your Child's True Potential, ISBN 978-0-470-64005-0. Kennedy-Moore, E. & Lowenthal, M. (2011). Jossey-Bass/Wiley (for parents)
- Raising Emotionally and Socially Healthy Kids, ISBN 978-1-629-97095-0, ASIN B00NXHABCE. Kennedy-Moore, E. (2014)
- Growing Friendships: A Kid's Guide to Making and Keeping Friends ISBN 978-1-58270-588-0 Kennedy-Moore, E. & McLaughlin, C. (2017), Beyond Words/Aladdin/Simon & Schuster (for elementary school children)
- What's My Child Thinking? Practical Psychology for Modern Parents, For Ages 2-7 ISBN 978-1-46547-937-2 Kennedy-Moore, E. (contributing editor) & Carey, T. (2019), Dorling Kindersley (for parents)
- Kid Confidence: Help Your Child Make Friends, Build Resilience, and Develop Real Self-Esteem ISBN 978-1-68403-049-1 Kennedy-Moore, E. (2019), New Harbinger (for parents). The book received a starred review from Kirkus and was selected as a "favorite" book of 2019 by Berkeley's Greater Good.
- Growing Friendships During the Coronavirus Pandemic: A Kids' Guide to Staying Close to Friends While Being Apart Kennedy-Moore, E. & McLaughlin, C. (2020), Beyond Words (for elementary school children)
