= Juffali =

Juffali is of Arabic origin which is commonly used as a surname in Saudi Arabia. It may refer to

== Companies ==
- E. A. Juffali and Brothers, Saudi Arabian company

== Surname ==
- Ahmed Juffali (1924 – 1994), Saudi Arabian businessman and founder of E. A. Juffali and Brothers
- Khaled Juffali (born 1958), Saudi Arabian businessman and chairman of E. A. Juffali and Brothers
- Reema Juffali (born 1992), Saudi Arabian racing driver and first Saudi Arabian female car racing driver
- Walid Juffali (1955 – 2016), Saudi Arabian businessman and former chairman of E. A. Juffali and Brothers
