= Grade II* listed buildings in Runnymede (district) =

Runnymede shown within Surrey

There are over 20,000 Grade II* listed buildings in England. This page is a list of the twenty Grade II* buildings in the district of Runnymede in Surrey. For links to similar articles in relation to the other 10 districts of Surrey see Grade II* listed buildings in Surrey.

Name	Location	Type	Completed (Note: The date given is the date used by Historic England as significant for the initial building or that of an important part in the structure's description.)	Date designated	Grid ref. (Note: Sometimes known as OSGB36, the grid reference is based on the British national grid reference system used by the Ordnance Survey.) Geo-coordinates	Entry number (Note: The "List Entry Number" is a unique number assigned to each listed building and scheduled monument by Historic England.)	Image
Botleys Park Mansion	Chertsey	Great House	Modern	9 June 1972	TQ0214264884; 51°22′26″N 0°32′02″W	1029181	Botleys Park Mansion More images
Cemex House (formerly RMC House)	Egham	House	1988–1989	10 July 2014	TQ0297668821; 51°24′33″N 0°31′15″W	1420102	Upload Photo
Church of Saint John the Baptist	Egham	Church	1817-1820	11 July 1951	TQ0130871367; 51°25′56″N 0°32′39″W	1189321	Church of Saint John the Baptist More images
Lychgate of the Church of Saint John the Baptist	Egham	Lych Gate	1744	11 July 1951	TQ0127771405; 51°25′57″N 0°32′40″W	1028978	Upload Photo
Church of Saint Simon and Saint Jude	Englefield Green	Church	1859	17 November 1986	SU9928270838; 51°25′40″N 0°34′24″W	1028958	Church of Saint Simon and Saint Jude More images
Pair of Mausolea	Englefield Green	Chest Tomb	Dated 1862	17 August 1989	SU9931170807; 51°25′39″N 0°34′23″W	1242772	Pair of Mausolea More images
Church of St Mary	Thorpe	Church	12th century	17 November 1986	TQ0238468642; 51°24′27″N 0°31′46″W	1189962	Church of St Mary More images
Church of St Peter	Chertsey	Parish Church	13th century	26 September 1951	TQ0420266995; 51°23′33″N 0°30′13″W	1029167	Church of St Peter More images
Curfew House	Chertsey	House	18th century	26 September 1951	TQ0414567018; 51°23′34″N 0°30′16″W	1242226	Upload Photo
Englefield Green House	Englefield Green	House	18th century or earlier	17 November 1986	SU9927371689; 51°26′08″N 0°34′24″W	1378020	Upload Photo
Fort Belvedere	Egham	Country house	c. 1828	17 November 1986	SU9663668184; 51°24′16″N 0°36′44″W	1294245	Fort Belvedere More images
Pyrcroft House	Chertsey	House	Mid 18th century	26 September 1951	TQ0334666818; 51°23′28″N 0°30′58″W	1377926	Pyrcroft House
Royal Air Force Memorial	Runnymede	War Memorial	1953	25 September 1998	SU9983771942; 51°26′16″N 0°33′54″W	1376599	Royal Air Force Memorial More images
St Ann's Court	Chertsey	Villa	1936-37	15 January 1986	TQ0279067333; 51°23′45″N 0°31′26″W	1260122	St Ann's Court More images
Teahouse and Grotto in Grounds of St Ann's Hill House	Chertsey	Grotto	18th century	9 June 1972	TQ0246667117; 51°23′38″N 0°31′43″W	1029160	Upload Photo
The chapel at former Holloway Sanatorium	Virginia Water	Chapel	1882-1884	17 November 1986	TQ0026068257; 51°24′16″N 0°33′36″W	1119659	The chapel at former Holloway Sanatorium More images
The Cottage	Thorpe	House	18th century	11 July 1951	TQ0215468789; 51°24′32″N 0°31′57″W	1378051	The Cottage More images
The Temple of Augustus (Leptis Magna)	Virginia Water	Wall	Roman	17 November 1986	SU9746568622; 51°24′30″N 0°36′00″W	1378028	The Temple of Augustus (Leptis Magna) More images
Thorpe House	Thorpe	House	17th century	11 July 1951	TQ0231168781; 51°24′32″N 0°31′49″W	1190067	Upload Photo
25 Windsor Street	Chertsey	House	Early 18th century	26 September 1951	TQ0411867004; 51°23′33″N 0°30′18″W	1377931	Upload Photo
