= Egham Hythe =

Village and parish in Surrey, England

Coordinates: 51.424°N 0.524°W

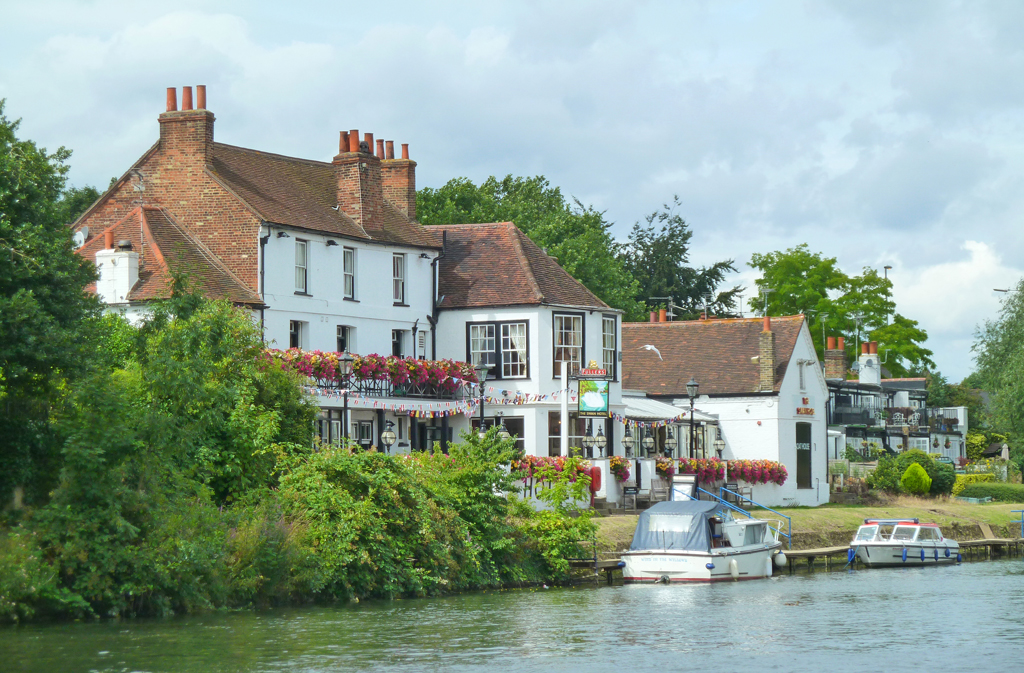
- The Swan Inn

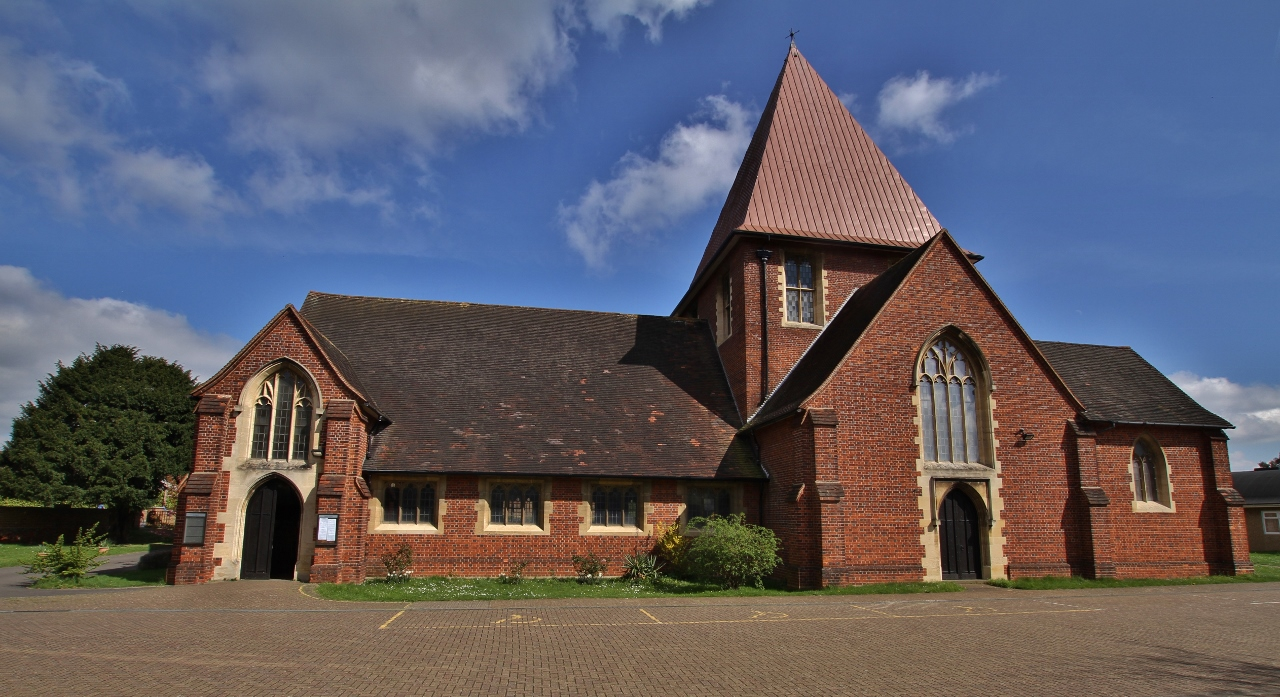
- St Paul's Anglican Church (built 1930)

- Location within Surrey
- Area: 1.91 km^{2} (0.74 sq mi)
- Population: 7,203 (2021. Runnymede Ward)
  - Density: 3,771/km^{2} (9,770/sq mi)
- OS grid reference: TQ025705
  - London: 17.8 mi (28.6 km)
- District: Runnymede
- Shire county: Surrey
- Region: South East
- Country: England
- Sovereign state: United Kingdom
- Post town: STAINES-UPON-THAMES
- Postcode district: TW18
- Dialling code: 01784
- Police: Surrey
- Fire: Surrey
- Ambulance: South East Coast
- UK Parliament: Runnymede and Weybridge

Egham Hythe, Pooley Green and Thorpe Lea are adjacent settlements in the Borough of Runnymede in Surrey, England, approximately 18 miles (29 km) west of central London. They are separated from the town of Egham by the M25 and from Staines upon Thames by the River Thames.

Egham Hythe has been bypassed by the A30 since the 1950s. It is home to Staines Boat Club and four pubs. It has a large riverside inn and hotel facing the inn, in a conservation area known as the Hythe, meaning port in Old and Middle English. One end of Staines Bridge, a 'local road' crossing of the river, connects Egham Hythe to Staines and the Thames Path crosses from one bank to the other.

== History ==
=== The Abbey and the causeway ===
In the centuries around the time of the Norman Conquest the tything of the Hythe, which belonged to Chertsey Abbey, supported only shepherd's tenements and lowly agriculture dwellings due to flooding quite often by the river Thames. The consistent use of the Hythe in ecclesiastical records, Assize Rolls and feet of fines denotes that Anglo-Saxon speakers ran an inland port here, as hythe means port in Old and Middle English. The other three Egham tythings were:

- Town
- Strode (later also known as Stroude)
- Englefield

A water-mill known as Trumpes Mill on the stream marking with border of Thorpe in about 1500 was granted with the manor of Mylton or Middleton occupying most of the tything that was not common land to the college of Corpus Christi; tithes from it to the value of 21s. 4d (equivalent to £812 in 2025 based on rough 1323 annual rent calculations) remained due to the almoner of Chertsey Abbey until the Dissolution in 1537. The last long lessee of the manor, still somewhat intact, was Priscilla Edgell who married Richard Wyatt in 1766, their surnames giving rise to the current names of streets.

Thomas de Oxenford to protect many fields, even Chertsey from common winter deluge and summer flash flooding at his own expense constructed the great Egham Causeway, leading from the town of Egham to the bridge of Staines, in the time of Henry III to be used as a highway and as a dyke (embankment), which prevented the inundation of "all the surrounding country" by the River Thames as caused regularly following prolonged heavy rainfall. In 1350 a royal commission was appointed to find the persons responsible for the repair of the causeway, damaged by flood, but decided that none was so responsible. By 1385 the Sheriff of Surrey was irked by the causeway's condition and ordered by public proclamation:

...that all persons, ecclesiastical as well as secular, shall each, according to the extent of his holding, cause the same to be repaired with all haste.

Before the century was finished, Chertsey Abbey frequently undertook the repair out of charity and the Abbot found himself in his words of 1395, charged with its repair by "the malevolent instigation of adversaries" and he prayed for a better settlement. Using the large passing trade of Staines Bridge various ordinary people in the 15th century were bound to keep up the causeway including Thomas Stanes, John Edmed, William Mulso in return for being given the right to levy tolls (grants of pontage). The character of the partly Tudor street has been protected by the designation of a conservation area and the building in the 19th century of Staines Bridge directly upstream of it rather than being its main street as it was before that reconstruction.

=== 19th century enclosure of the common ===
One of the two significant commons of Egham here known as Hythefield, was stated to be in Stevenson's 1809 survey more highly rent-able than most such common of Surrey were it to be made private, was enclosed on 12 June 1817 – to this day two large publicly administered allotments provide fertile soil in the Pooley Green locality for tomato and vegetable growers who wish to hire these, subject to a waiting list.

=== Industrialisation/commercialisation ===
A gradual increase in housing and population was boosted by the building of the railway in the 1850s with stations at neighbouring Egham and Staines. The lack of forest and elevated views assisted its subdivision, most of Egham was a flat former flood plain below its western hills – in 1911 six large private Egham estates are listed, all in the west of the parish.

Egham Hythe gained its first school in the 1880s and its own parish church, having separated from Egham's in 1930. Much of the campaigning and financial support for the church came from local resident and entrepreneur Edward Budgen.

Though Egham Hythe suffered a particularly severe flood in 1947, the population increased in the period 1951–1961, forming always approximately a third of the homes of the old civil (secular) parish of Egham disbanded in 1965, the population of which rose from 22,241 to 30,571 however the definition of Egham as a local unit at the time included Thorpe, and the whole rose from 7,786 acres (3,151 ha) to 9,350 acres (3,784 ha; 37.84 km^{2}) in the same period.

== Economy ==
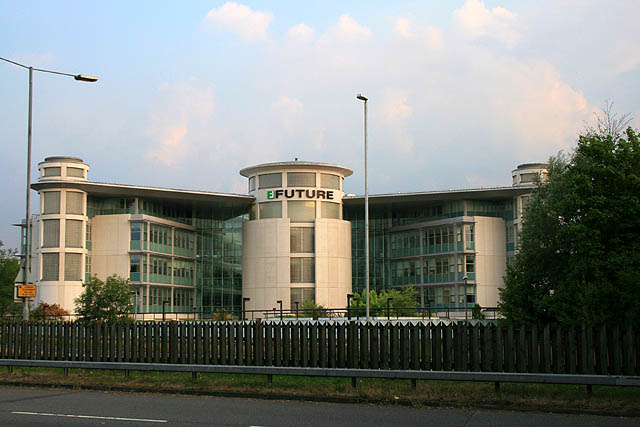
One of the large modern business, storage, industrial and retail premises on The Causeway

Industry has played an important role in the northernmost part of Egham Hythe since the 19th century due to the historic prominence of the Causeway as the route out of London for all passing traffic on the WSW axis, since superseded by alternative routes, the A30 and M3. Nonetheless the motorway connection makes the road very well-connected to these and to the M4. Prior to the Second World War the area was home to Lagonda, the motorcar manufacturers. The Lagonda site was later taken over by Petters Limited and is a Sainsbury's supermarket.

In commerce, research and industry the Causeway has the large headquarters of Centrica and their UK operation British Gas as well as a Veolia Water production centre and office headquarters. Current owners and tenants of business park premises include: Fujitsu Siemens, Dataserv, Gartner, Acton Bright Steel (metals for construction), Halfords, Salesforce.com, Future Electronics, Homebase and Cala Homes.

== Amenities ==
=== Schools ===
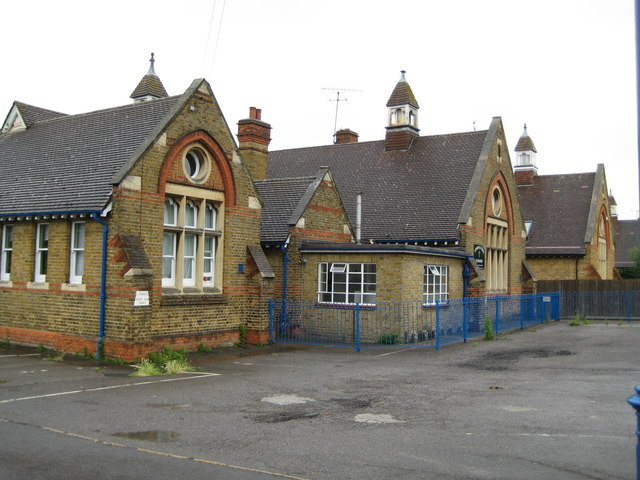
Egham Hythe Primary School

Egham Hythe has two primary schools (Thorpe Lea School and The Hythe School) and the area's academy-status secondary school – The Magna Carta School and a start-of-21st century community centre.

Egham Hythe Primary School was built in Victorian times and was located opposite St Paul's Church to the right of The Community Centre, which was built in the 1960s, at around the same time that the new Secondary School. The old primary school was converted into new housing and apartments in the late 1990s, but the school building's exterior walls and roof were retained.

=== Religion ===
Its churches include High but modern Anglicanism (St Paul's) Methodism (Wendover Road church) and a Pentecostal fellowship. St John of Rochester Roman Catholic church. In Staines a wider range of religions have their own places of community and worship.

=== Thorpe Hay Meadow ===
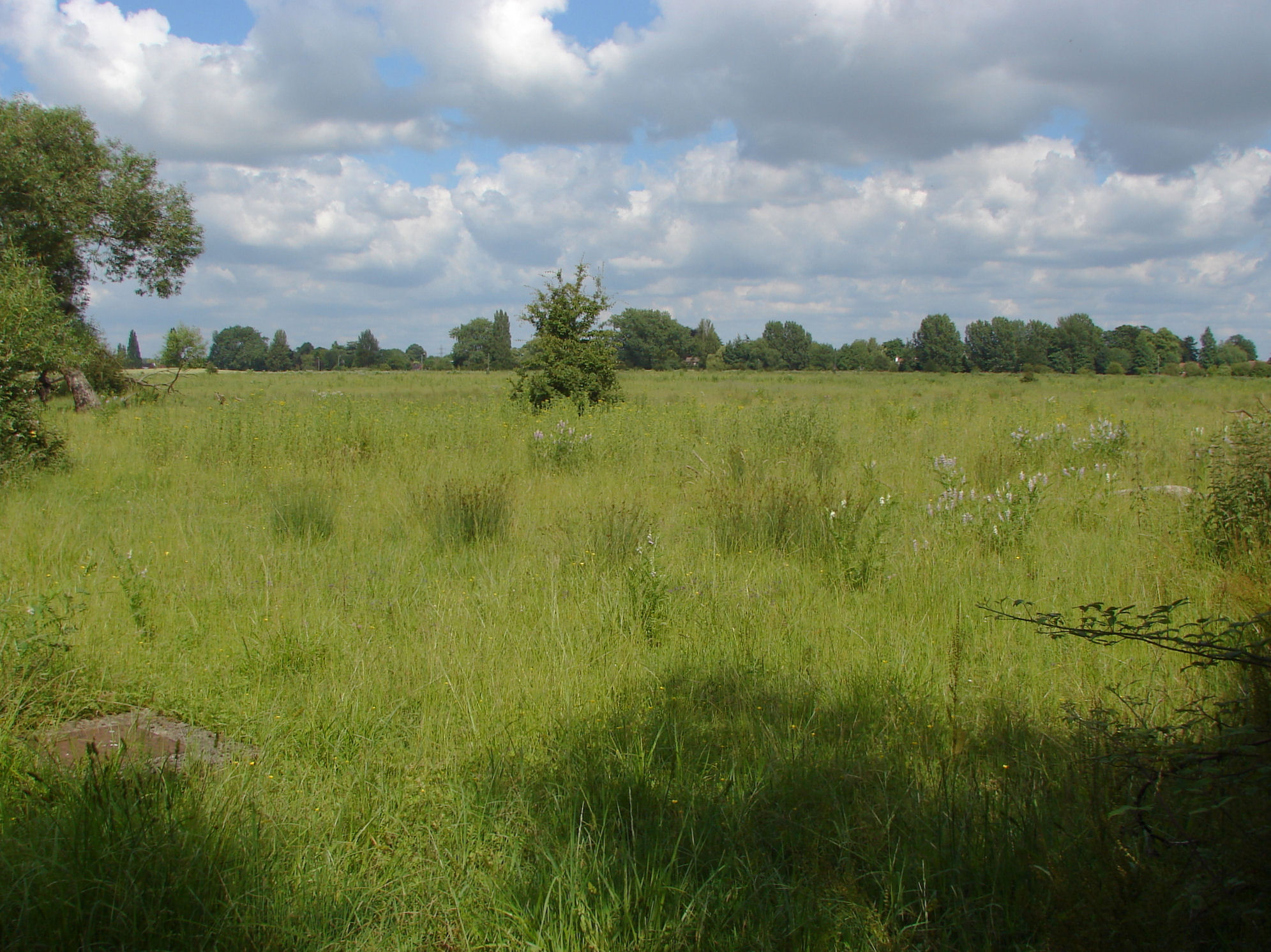
Thorpe Hay Meadow, Egham Hythe and Thorpe

Egham Hythe provides access to Thorpe Hay Meadow, one of the few surviving example of unimproved grassland on Thames Gravel in Surrey. It has been managed by Surrey Wildlife Trust since 1988. This 16-acre (6.5 ha) site contains at least 157 different plant species. It is managed to encourage biodiversity.

== Demography ==
The proportion of households in Egham Hythe who owned their home outright was 11.2% below the regional average. The proportion who owned their home with a loan was 4.1% higher than the regional average; providing overall a greater proportion than average of rented residential property and of social housing, and above to the average in Surrey and Runnymede and slightly higher than the national average; a third, 539 households were rented directly from the local authority in 2011.

2011 Census Key Statistics
Output area	Population	Households	% Owned outright	% Owned with a loan	hectares
Egham Hythe (ward)	6,474	1,640	21.3	39.2	191

== Local government ==
At Surrey County Council, one of the 81 representatives represents the area within the Egham division.

At Runnymede Borough Council all wards of the borough are deemed appropriate to be represented under the current constitution of councillors by three councillors.

Runnymede Borough Councillor
Election	Member	Party	Ward
2024	Ricky Milstead	Labour and Co-operative	Egham Hythe
2019	Robert Ashley King	Labour and Co-operative	Egham Hythe
2022	James Rhys Davies	Labour and Co-operative	Egham Hythe

Surrey County Councillor
Election	Member	Electoral Division
2021	Robert Ashley King	Egham
