= Bishopsgate House, Egham =

Large house in Englefield Green, Egham, Surrey, England

Coordinates: 51.4385°N 0.5933°W

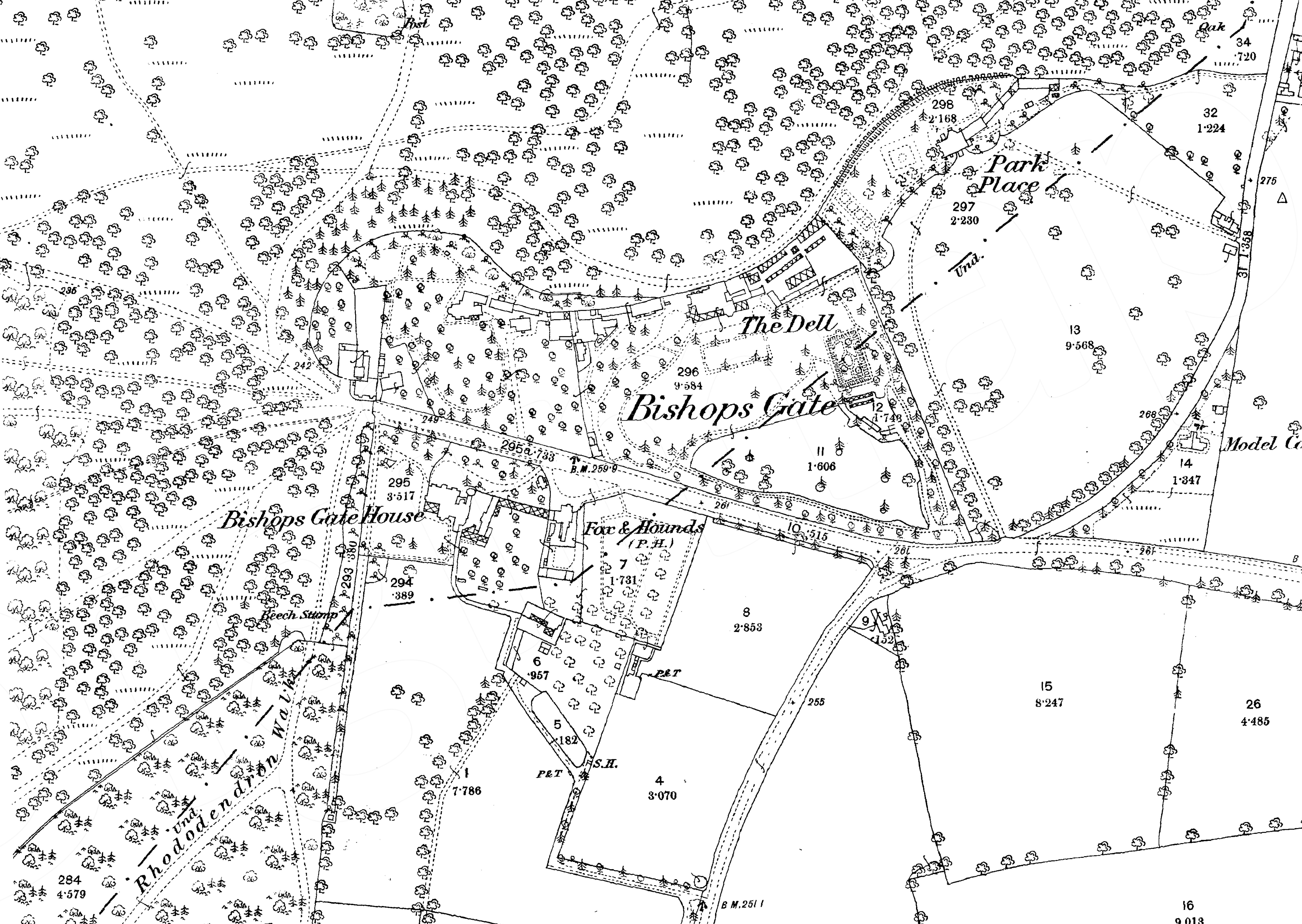
The original Bishops Gate House (centre) on an 1882 Ordnance Survey map.

Bishopsgate House is a large house in Englefield Green, Egham, Surrey, England. Its 42-acre estate lies close to one of the entrances to Windsor Great Park. It was built immediately to the south of the old Bishops Gate House that was demolished in the twentieth century.

== History ==
In 1863, Bishops Gate House was home to Charles Joyce, a member of the Royal Agricultural Society of England, and in 1872, a four-and-a-half-year lease (then renewable yearly) was granted to Richard James Ashton.

During the Second World War, the house was the headquarters of 4 Wireless Group of the Royal Corps of Signals, who occupied a number of large country houses in the Egham area.

Bishopsgate House was built in the later twentieth century and is "one of several British homes" of the Saudi billionaire Walid Juffali and his second wife Christina Estrada, until his death in July 2016, who acquired it from his parents in about 2001. There were "three butlers, six gardeners, five maids, two laundry girls, two drivers, two personal assistants, two nannies and an estate manager on the staff". Juffali's art collection, estimated at £4 million, which includes art installations and sculpture in the garden and fittings from the house, will be auctioned onsite by Bonham's on 26 March 2018.
