= Emmanuel Barthélemy =

French mechanic and revolutionary

- Born: 1823; Sceaux, Hauts-de-Seine, France
- Died: 22 January 1855 (aged 32/33); Outside Newgate Prison, London
- Cause of death: Execution by hanging
- Occupations: mechanic, revolutionary
- Known for: Fighting the last duel in the United Kingdom
- Status: Executed
- Conviction: Murder
- Penalty: Death

Emmanuel Barthélemy (1823–1855) was a French revolutionary and a member of secret Blanquist societies during the reign of Louis-Phillipe, the citizen king of France in the July Monarchy from 1830 until 1848. He fled to London in 1850.

He is remembered for being the winner of the last fatal duel in England, fought in 1852 with another French exile. In 1855, he was hanged in London after killing two Englishmen.

== Revolutionary activity ==
Born in 1823, Barthélemy was from Sceaux, Hauts-de-Seine, on the outskirts of Paris. In 1839, he was imprisoned for shooting a police officer during a coup attempt by the Société des saisons, led by Louis Auguste Blanqui and Armand Barbès. Some sources state the officer was killed, others state he was only wounded.

Barthélemy was released in 1847 during a general amnesty. The following year he participated in the June Days Uprising in Paris, which saw working-class Parisians erecting barricades and battling government troops between 23 and 26 June 1848. Barthélemy commanded the insurrectionists manning a barricade blocking Rue de la Grange-aux-Belles until overcome by forces commanded by General Lamoricière. The barricade (although from a different uprising) is described in detail in volume 5 of Victor Hugo's Les Misérables. In the aftermath of the uprising, he was arrested and convicted. He was held at the Conciergerie prison, but nevertheless managed to escape to London in 1849 or 1850. (Note: Wilhelm Liebknecht later wrote that Barthélemy was due to be exiled to the penal colony at Devil's Island and avoided that fate by escaping from prison, but the prison colony was not opened until 1852, two years after Barthélemy arrived in London.)

== Exile in London ==
In London, Barthélemy became involved in producing a journal, Les Veilles du Peuple, alongside Louis Auguste Blanqui, Eugène Sue, and others. He became prominent amongst those exiles who were followers of Blanqui, although he was mistrusted by some who suspected him of being a spy for the French government.

Barthélemy came into contact with Karl Marx and Wilhelm Liebknecht. They met at an establishment in Rathbone Place, popular with French exiles, where fencing and pistol shooting were taught and practiced and where Barthélemy coached Marx in fencing.

Barthélemy visited Karl and Jenny Marx at their apartment several times although Jenny Marx disliked him intensely. Barthélemy was also an associate of the German radical August Willich. According to Wilhelm Liebknecht, Willich and Barthélemy plotted to kill Marx for being too conservative. In 1850, Willich publicly insulted Marx and challenged him to a duel, which Marx refused to fight. However Willich was challenged in turn by Konrad Schramm, a young follower of Marx. The duel, with pistols, took place in Belgium, with Barthélemy acting as Willich's second. Schramm was wounded, but survived the encounter.

=== The last duel in England ===
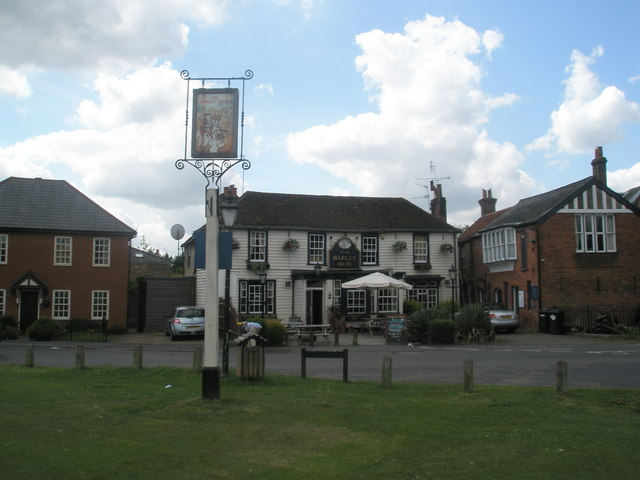
The Barley Mow, Englefield Green, in 2006

In 1852, Barthélemy fought the last fatal duel in England. His opponent was Frédéric Constant Cournet, a former French naval officer. Cournet had also taken part in the July 1848 uprising. He had been elected to the National Assembly in 1850, but in the same year had been imprisoned for helping Eugène Edine Pottier escape from prison. He fled France after leading the unsuccessful resistance in Paris to the Coup d'etat of Napoleon III in 1851. Although both men were on the political left, Cournet was a follower of Alexandre Auguste Ledru-Rollin and so was an opponent of Barthélemy and Louis Blanqui. Barthélemy challenged Cournet after taking offence at remarks Cournet made about a former girlfriend of his.

The duel took place outside London, on 19 October at Priest Hill, near Englefield Green. Cournet and Barthélemy, each accompanied by two men acting as seconds, traveled by train to the meeting place.

Cournet received a bullet wound, but Barthélemy was unhurt. He and his two seconds left the scene to return to London. One of Cournet's seconds fled and was never found but the other remained by his side until both men were found by chance by a local doctor. Cournet was carried to a nearby pub, the Barley Mow, and the police were alerted. By this time, Barthélemy and his two seconds were on the train to London. However, the Surrey police alerted their London colleagues by telegraph and the three were arrested when they arrived at Waterloo station. News of the encounter had been widely circulated amongst the French immigrant community, which was polarized between supporters of Cournet and Ledru-Rollin, and those who supported Barthélemy and Louis Blanqui. On the day of the duel, a crowd had gathered at Waterloo station to hear the result. Reportedly, bets were placed on the outcome.

Cournet died in agony some hours after being wounded and his second was arrested. The four Frenchmen were together tried for murder on 21 March 1853 at Kingston Assizes. The jury found them not guilty of murder, but guilty of manslaughter. By this time they had been in prison for five months while awaiting trial so the judge sentenced them only to a further two months in prison.

Cournet is buried at St. John's Church, Egham.

== Murder conviction and execution ==
In 1854, Barthélemy began working as an engineer for a soda water maker called George Moore. On the evening of 8 December 1854, he visited his employer's house at Warren Street, London, accompanied by a woman. Evidence suggested the meeting was initially cordial, (Note: Police later discovered drinks that Moore had poured for himself and his guests, indicating he was prepared to be hospitable to them.) but it ended in a struggle which resulted in Moore being beaten with a stick, then shot and killed. As Barthélemy left the house, Charles Collard, an ex-policeman who kept a neighbouring greengrocer's shop attempted to stop his escape but was shot and wounded. Barthélemy was apprehended by a bystander after a chase and a violent struggle. His companion escaped in the confusion; her face was concealed by a heavy veil and she was never identified or arrested. There were press claims she was a man in disguise, but this was denied by the police, who later stated their belief she escaped the country.

Collard died the next day from his wound, although not before identifying Barthélemy as the man who shot him, when he was brought to his hospital bedside. Barthélemy was tried for the murder of Charles Collard on 4 January 1855 (he was not charged over the killing of George Moore (Note: Aside from the unknown woman, there were no witnesses to the killing of Moore and so the charge would have been harder to prove. A number of bystanders had witnessed the shooting of Collard.)). He was defended by Robert Collier QC but was found guilty.

Although the jury delivered a strong recommendation for mercy, the judges John Campbell, 1st Baron Campbell and Richard Crowder, condemned him to death. It was only after his conviction, that he gave an account of what happened. He stated he quarreled with Moore over money that Moore owed to the woman. He shot Collard accidentally while struggling with him in his attempt to escape. However it was later suggested that Barthélemy was actually attempting to blackmail Moore and the woman who accompanied him was either Moore's daughter, or a woman posing as Moore's daughter. Wilhelm Liebknecht later wrote in his work Karl Marx: Biographical Memoirs, that before the meeting with Moore, Barthélemy had been planning to travel to France. He had managed to obtain an admission ticket to a ball due to be held at the Tuileries Palace and planned to attempt the assassination of Napoleon III during the event.

Some figures publicly called for a reprieve of Barthélemy's death sentence, claiming that the shooting of Moore was the result of an angry quarrel and not premeditated, and that Collard was shot accidentally. However, there was no reprieve. During his final days before his execution, Barthélemy scandalized his jailors, and the priests given the task of ministering to him, by repeatedly confirming his firm atheism. He said he saw no purpose in praying to God, as God would not break the rope when he was hanged. A request he made to the authorities was for a French translation of Paradise Lost, a copy was found for him with some difficulty and he read it with great attention during his final days.

Barthélemy was publicly hanged at Newgate, on the morning of Monday 22 January 1855. His final request was to hold a piece of paper in his hand while he was hanged - this was later found to be a letter from a Frenchwoman called Sophie. It was speculated she was the woman present at the killing of Moore, but nothing further was ever known about her.

== Legacy ==
After his execution, a wax effigy of Barthélemy was exhibited at Madame Tussauds. Victor Hugo included a brief account of Barthélemy's life in his 1862 novel, Les Misérables. Pictures of his death mask were included in several texts on Phrenology.

Cournet and Barthélémy's duel was fictionalized in a short, 2010 French film, Le Dernier Duel. Barthélémy was played by André Refig. It won an award for the best short film at the 2011 British Independent Film Festival.
