= Ruth Bowyer =

English convict (c. 1761 – 1788)

- Born: c. 1761
- Died: 5 June 1788 (aged 26–27); Sydney Cove, Australia
- Other name: Ruth Baldwin
- Occupation: Kitchen maid
- Conviction: Stealing
- Penalty: Seven years' penal transportation

Ruth Bowyer (c. 1761 – 5 June 1788), also known as Ruth Baldwin, was an English convict sent to Australia aboard a ship of the First Fleet. Convicted in 1786 for the theft of five spoons from a Surrey hotel, she was sentenced to seven years' transportation but died two years later and was buried beside the shore of Sydney Cove.

== Early life ==
Prior to her arrest, Bowyer had been living with her aunt in Egham in Surrey. In May 1786 she started work as a kitchen maid at the Bush Hotel at Staines but was dismissed on 24 June. Later that day the publican, Joseph White, noticed that three monogrammed table spoons and two silver dessert spoons were missing from the hotel.

Bowyer was arrested on 7 October on suspicion of stealing the spoons. She spent three weeks in Newgate Prison and was brought to trial at the Old Bailey on 25 October before a twelve-member jury and Justice William Rose of London.

== Trial ==
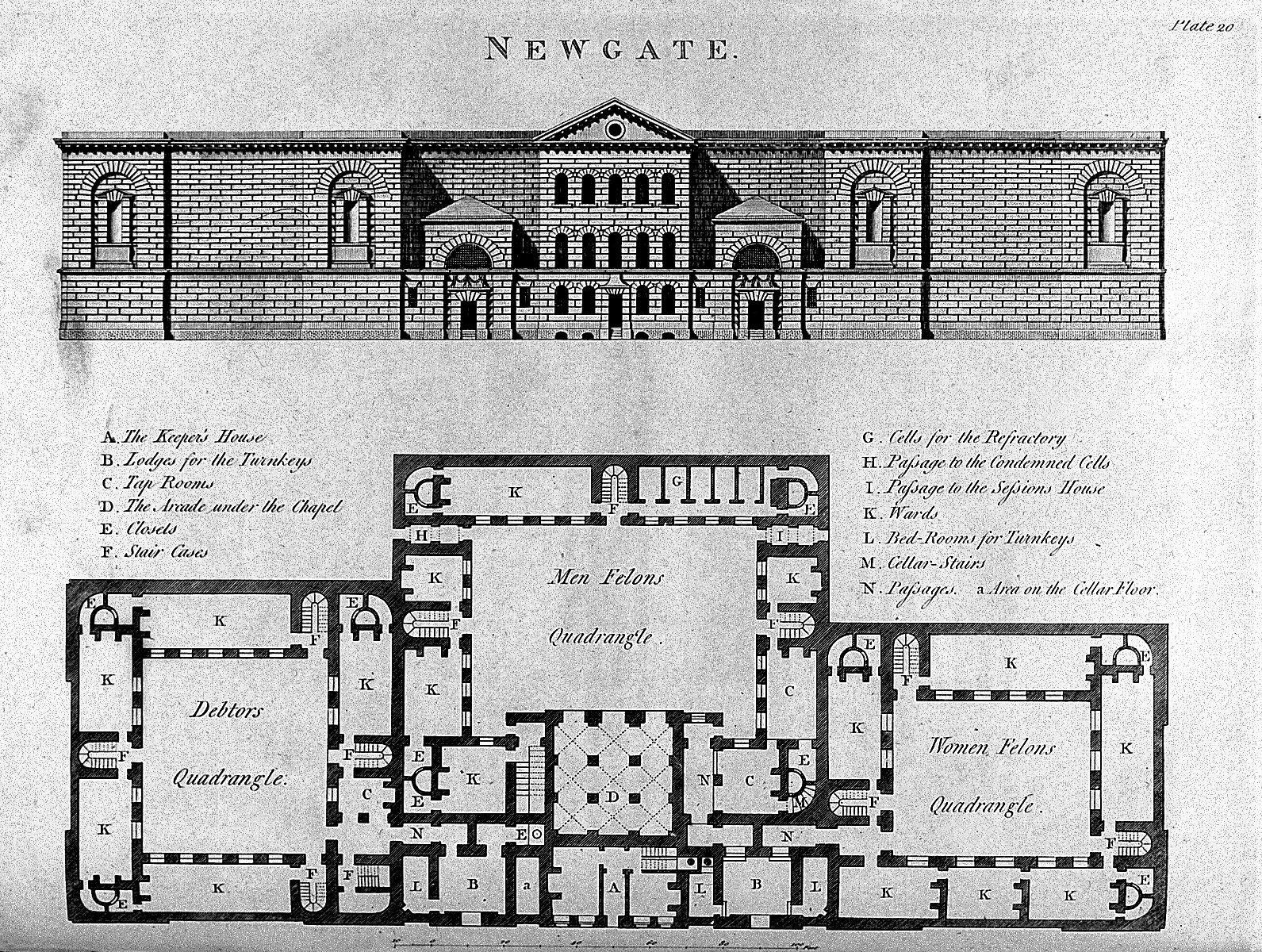
A plan of Newgate Prison, where Bowyer was confined after her arrest. Source: Original in the Crace Collection at the British Library

According to evidence at her trial, Bowyer had on 7 October approached James Coombes, an ironmonger in Windsor, asking to buy a gold ring in exchange for silver spoons. She had told Coombes that her name was Bowyer, and gave her address as the Six Bells Hotel in the town. Coombes doubted the spoons were hers to sell, and returned them to her after examining their monograms. Later he recognised the monograms as those from the Bush Hotel, and wrote to innkeeper White to advise him of the attempted sale.

A colleague of White's, publican Richard Martin, gave evidence that he, White and a local magistrate had then travelled to Egham to confront Bowyer in her home. Bowyer and her aunt were arrested and taken to Martin's hotel, the Castle. Bowyer had denied taking the spoons or attempting to sell them to Coombes, but was contradicted by Coombes himself who arrived to identify her.

Local constable James Fish also gave evidence, indicating he had attended the Castle Hotel at midnight on 7 October, and the following morning he and Bowyer had travelled to Windsor where she pointed out the spoons hidden in a hedge but claimed that another woman had put them there. The spoons were shown to White, who identified them as those stolen from him the preceding June.

Bowyer's only testimony was to tell the court, "I am not guilty of the crime; I have no witnesses." She was found guilty of feloniously stealing five spoons with a combined worth of 30 shillings, and was sentenced to seven years penal transportation.

== Transportation and death ==
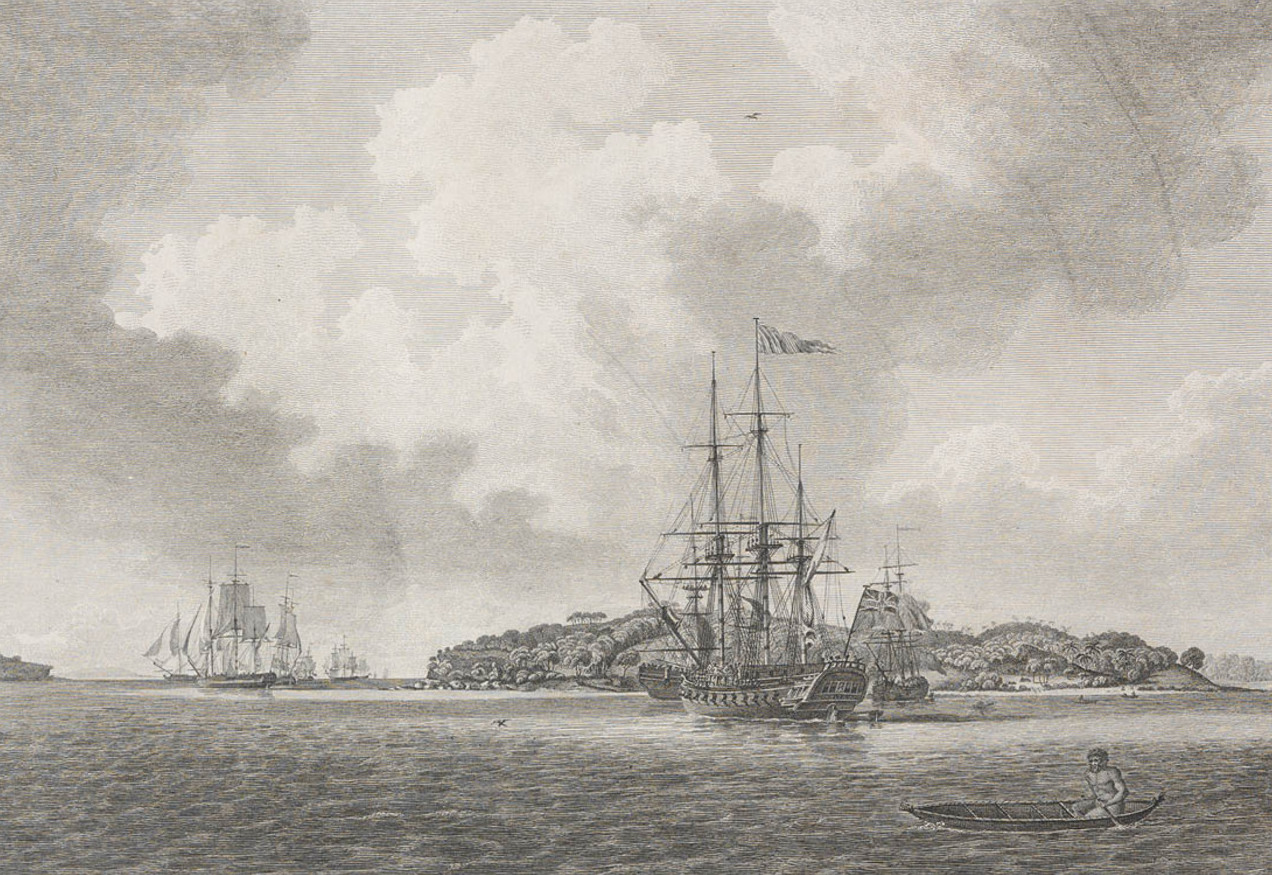
The First Fleet at voyage's end in 1788. Engraving from The Voyage of Governor Phillip to Botany Bay

Bowyer was returned to Newgate Prison where she remained for the next six months. On 30 April 1787 she and 36 other women were brought to Portsmouth and embarked aboard the convict transport Prince of Wales. Ten other female convicts were also brought from prison hulks on the Thames, bringing to 47 the total number of convicts aboard the ship.

Prince of Wales sailed from Portsmouth on 13 May 1787 as part of the First Fleet to Australia. Due to an administrative oversight, no female clothing had been brought aboard and Bowyer and her fellow convicts remained in their increasingly ragged prison apparel until 6 August, when the ship reached Rio de Janeiro and was resupplied. Near Rio, humid conditions and heavy rains generated a "plague of bugs" below decks with more than a hundred insects found in one small sleeping area alone. There were also reports of rats, fleas and lice, and an outbreak of scurvy in late December.

The Fleet reached Botany Bay on 18 January 1788, and relocated to Sydney Cove eight days later. On disembarkation around 200 of the male convicts from the Fleet were set to work clearing the foreshore and constructing huts. Female convicts including Bowyer were left to their own devices, subsisting on a limited ration of salted meat, rancid butter and shellfish. Conditions were harsh and Bowyer was one of 94 convicts who fell seriously ill within the first six months of arrival. She died on 5 June 1788, less than two years into her sentence, and was buried along the shoreline of the Cove.

== Bibliography ==
- Britton, Alex R., ed. (1978). Historical records of New South Wales. Vol. 1, part 2. Phillip, 1783–1792. Lansdown Slattery & Co. p. 56. OCLC 219911274.
- Chapman, Don (1981). 1788: The People of the First Fleet. Cassell Australia. ISBN 0726914177.
- Gillen, Mollie (1989). The Founders of Australia: A Biographical Dictionary of the First Fleet. Library of Australian History. ISBN 0908120699.
- Hill, David (2009). 1788. Random House Australia. ISBN 9781741668001.
