= Royal Holloway Students' Union =

Students' union in the UK

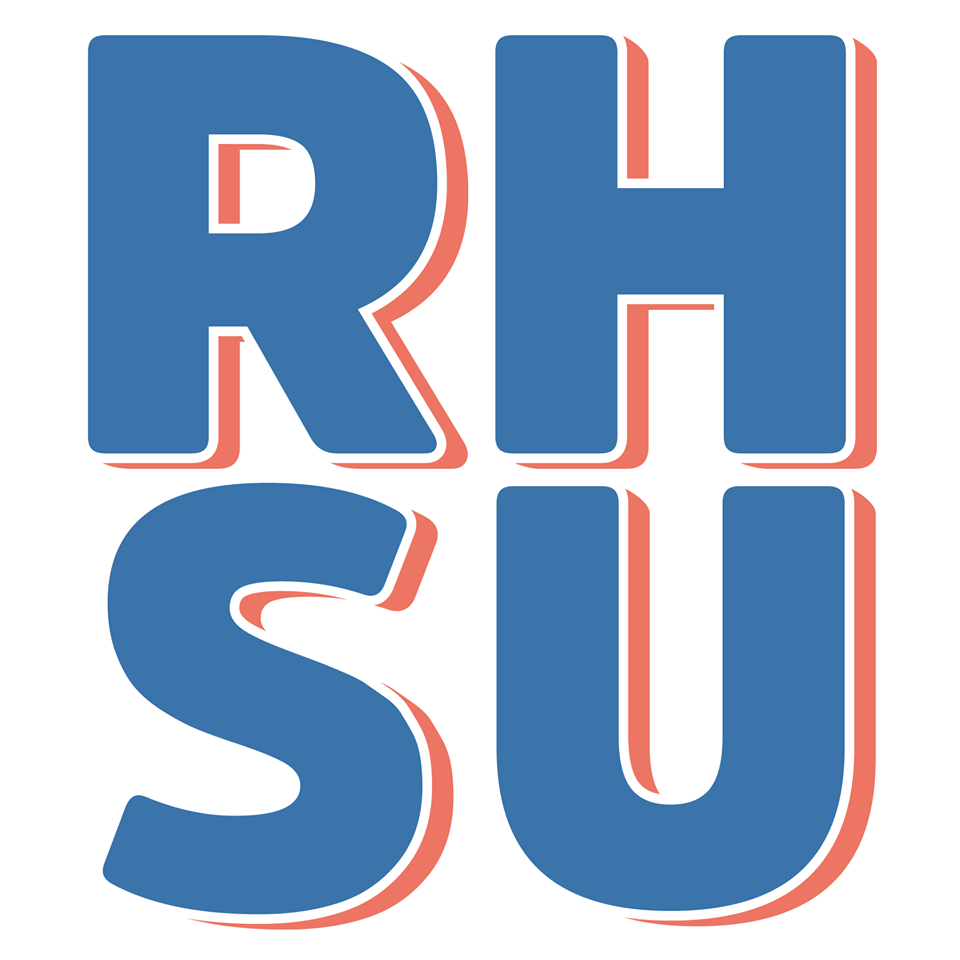
- Institution: Royal Holloway, University of London
- Location: Egham, Surrey, England, United Kingdom
- Established: 1994; 32 years ago
- President: Olivia Davies
- Chief Executive: Tony Logan
- Sabbatical officers: Matthew Paterson, Vaishnavi Vajja, David Gallardo González
- Affiliations: NUS
- Mascot: Colossus (the Bear)
- Website: www.su.rhul.ac.uk

The Royal Holloway Students' Union is a students' union for Royal Holloway, University of London, affiliated to the National Union of Students. In the words of The Independent, it "has a reputation as one of the best unions in the London area", and is responsible for much of the University's on-campus entertainment provision. It helps provides support to all of the University's ratified Sport Clubs and special-interest societies, as well as providing independent support to advisory services to its members.

== Governance ==
The Union is run by members from the student body, headed by a team of elected student officers, including four full-time salaried Sabbatical Officers, each elected for one year and eligible to run for a second term of office. The elected Officers' are held accountable by the legislative power of Councils and General Meetings. The Sabbatical Officers are assisted by a number of Executive Officers, all of whom operate in a voluntary capacity.

== Employees ==
In order to perform the administration and commercial activities of the Union, 30 permanent staff members are employed and more than 250 part-time student staff.

== Finance ==
The Union has a turnover of more than £2.6 million a year, with the University providing a so-called 'block grant' in excess of £815,000 to help the running of the organisation.

== Entertainment ==
The Commercial Services team provides entertainment seven days a week during term time. Their facilities within the Union's main building include a 1,200 person capacity function hall, three bars, and a cafe.This site was previously home to another bar, Stumble Inn, which was closed in 2015 following flooding and converted into storage for the Union's societies. In 2015, the Union took over management of The Union Shop, located within the new Emily Wilding Davison Library.

A number of high-profile acts have performed on Union Nights, including Lethal Bizzle, DJ Fresh, Jonas Blue, MNEK, Lawson, Coolio, The Hoosiers, N Dubz and Labrinth, alongside novelty acts such as The Cheeky Girls. Special guest appearances have been made by Made in Chelsea cast members, Jamie Laing, and Alex Mytton.

An annual Summer Ball is held at the Founder's Building at the year's end, with a breakfast for 'survivors' the following morning at 6 am. Headline acts have included Example, Professor Green, Nero, Rizzle Kicks, Stormzy and Katy B.

There are also weekly market days on Tuesday, where a variety of items are sold including fresh fruit, vegetables, books, and a range of oriental goods.

== The Advice Centre ==
The Advice Centre offers impartial advice to Royal Holloway students, predominantly on academic and housing issues.

== Student Opportunities ==
Over 130 student societies and clubs, run by committees of students, have been ratified by and receive support from the Union.

=== Societies ===
Societies cover a range of diverse interests, from performing arts to politics and ideology.

The oldest society on campus is the Savoy Opera Society which performs two to three comic operettas a year.

=== Sports Clubs ===
The Union is responsible for administering all sports club, including rowing, ultimate frisbee and a competitive cheerleading squad. The highest ranked teams by BUCS points are women's basketball and fencing.

=== Media ===
The main Royal Holloway Students' Union building houses the Insanity Radio station, which was established in 1998. The station has twice won the Silver Award for Best Student Radio Station at BBC Radio 1's Student Radio Awards, and has also won the Best Marketing and Promotions Award three times since 1999.

Released monthly, Orbital is a student magazine published monthly, covering subjects from culture and arts to society and sport. The magazine format was introduce in the early 1990s and was preceded by a newspaper called The Egham Sun. The publication has a readership of 3,000, and a print media budget of around £10,000. Orbital was named runner-up at the 2000 Guardian Student Media Awards in the category of Student Magazine of the Year. The magazine was named the Best Student Magazine at the 2006 National Student Journalism Awards, as well as being nominated in two other categories: Best Student Critic and Best Student Photographer. Judges from the media industry said of the magazine, it is "gritty, witty, relevant and coherent, packaged with good design and strong front covers."

In the 2012–2013 academic year, rhubarbTV became the Union's third ratified media outlet. Originally a web-based news station, it was started in 2010 by Nicholas Stylianou, who had previously served as Editor of the Orbital. The name is an acronym, standing for "Royal Holloway’s Unique Broadcasting and Recording Brand". The outlet now has a team of directors, camera operators and editors who specialise in the production of live-event broadcasts, news updates, game shows and short documentaries, all of which are published on YouTube.

=== Fundraising ===
The Union has a (RAG) unit which raises money for charity and acts as a mechanism for recording fundraising activities by Sports Clubs and Societies. Fundraising events are held throughout the year, which include an annual pantomime, cake sales, music gigs, bar crawls, and rag raids.
