= Insanity Radio 103.2FM =

Insanity Radio
- England
- Broadcast area: North Surrey, England
- Frequency: 103.2 MHz

Programming
- Format: CHR (daytime); Variety (evenings)
- Affiliations: Student Radio Association

Ownership
- Owner: Royal Holloway Students' Union; (Royal Holloway, University of London)

History
- Founded: 1998
- First air date: 1998 (RSL), 2000 (AM), 2012 (FM)
- Former frequencies: 1287 kHz (2000–2014)

Technical information
- ERP: 25 watts
- Transmitter coordinates: 51.426075°N 0.564840°W FM, 51.426736°N 0.560040°W AM

Links
- Webcast: Listen live
- Website: Official website

Insanity Radio 103.2FM is a community radio station broadcasting to north Surrey, England from Royal Holloway, University of London on 103.2FM and online. It targets young people in the 15-25 age bracket, broadcasting a varied schedule of locally produced programming for up to 18 hours per day during term time, and is run by members of the local community.

Live programmes run from early morning to late evenings on weekdays, starting at a later time of 9 am on weekends. Overnight, a selection of music from the station's playlists is played. In late 2013, the station reported having over 140 volunteers producing 92 weekly shows.

The majority of programming during the day takes a CHR format, playing music from the station's weekly playlists. There are also talk-based shows which discuss current affairs. In the evenings, specialist programming covers a wide range of genres including Asian, Blues, Electronic, Hip hop, Rock and classic pop.

== History ==
The station began as Royal Holloway's Radio Society in 1997 after Ed Harry had sent four delegates (Richard Clarke, Ian Joliet, Simon Delany and Karen Williams) to the annual Student Radio Conference in Edinburgh.

Insanity Radio was formed a year later, taking its name loosely from the fact that Royal Holloway's founder Thomas Holloway also opened the Holloway Sanatorium, a hospital for the treatment of the mentally ill, a short distance away.

It began broadcasting under Restricted Service Licences in 1998, allowing it to broadcast for 28 consecutive days, twice a year on different frequencies, commonly 87.7FM. The station initially operated from a studio in a spare room in Royal Holloway's historic Founder's Building, with cabling running to a mast on the roof.

In 1999 the station was forced to move out of the Founder's Building and find a new home. Matt Deegan and Richard Clarke started making lists of rooms in the university that they felt were acceptable to base the radio station. All of these ideas were dismissed, except for a seminar room in the Queen's Annexe. After getting the budget cleared by the Students' Union it was constructed into a broadcasting studio, a meeting room and a production studio, which was retired in 2014.

In September 2000, the station was granted a Long-term Restricted Services Licence to broadcast on low-power AM (LPAM) all year round on 1287 kHz. The AM transmitter on 1287 kHz closed on 1 June 2014 after a 128.7 hour marathon broadcast, timed to the license lapsing.

In 2015, Insanity moved to purpose built Media Suite on the top floor of Royal Holloway's Students' Union building, a self-contained complex consisting of three studios and an office. In 2019, the station was awarded a grant from The National Lottery Community Fund to utilise the previously-unused third studio.

== Community FM ==
In November 2008, Insanity Radio — led by then Station Manager Joe Friel — applied for a Community Radio Licence. The licence was granted by Ofcom in February 2010. In late 2011, Ofcom allocated the frequency 103.2 MHz to the station, allowing it to broadcast on 103.2 MHz at a maximum power of 25W ERP.

The installation and testing of the transmission equipment began in February 2012, and the station officially began broadcasting on FM on 7 March 2012, with the transmitter being switched on by then Station Manager David Lamb and then Students' Union Vice President (Communications and Campaigns) Sarah Honeycombe.

Two new Production Board positions — Head of Community (Schools) and Head of Community (Youth Groups) — were created to reflect the station's new status as a community radio station. These positions were changed to Head of Community (Outreach) and Head of Community (Activities) in 2013.

The station is licensed to broadcast as a community radio station until March 2027. The license was successfully renewed in November 2016 for a further 5 years, and a second time in November 2021.

== Management ==
The station is run by an elected committee of 17 which meets weekly, known as the Production Board.

The Production Board positions are Station Manager, Assistant Station Manager, Head of Operations, Head of Programming, Head of Content & Standards, Head of Training, Head of Station Sound, Head of Audio Engineering, Head of Computing, Head of Online Content, Head of Community (Outreach), Head of Community (Activities), Head of Events, Head of Music, Head of News, Head of Marketing, Head of Publicity and Head of Visual Production. The Students' Union's President also sits on the board.

In addition, the station's operations are overseen by the Advisory Committee which meets quarterly to ensure that the station is meeting its licensing commitments. The Advisory Committee consists of members from the university, the Students' Union, two alumni (currently Julian Farmer and Nick Stylianou), the current Station Manager, and the current Assistant Station Manager.

As set out in the station's constitution, the positions of Station Manager and Assistant Station Manager are elected annually by students at the university in a campus-wide election, while the rest of the board are elected annually at the station's annual general meeting which is open to anybody.

== Technology ==
The station develops many open source software projects aimed at the radio sector, and documents its technical infrastructure online.

== Awards and recognition ==
The station has won a number of awards at the Student Radio Awards:, winning or taking the gold award for the following categories:

- 2024 Best Station Sound
- 2017 Best Technical Achievement: Nerve
- 2011 Best Technical Achievement: IRIS
- 2002 Best Marketing and Promotions
- 2001 Best Female: Natasha Sims
- 2000 Best Marketing and Promotions
- 1999 Best Marketing and Promotions

The station has also attained several silver and bronze Student Radio Awards over the past two decades, as well as taking home I Love Student Radio Awards.
