= The Cottage in Thorpe, Surrey =

Oldest home in Thorpe, Surrey, England

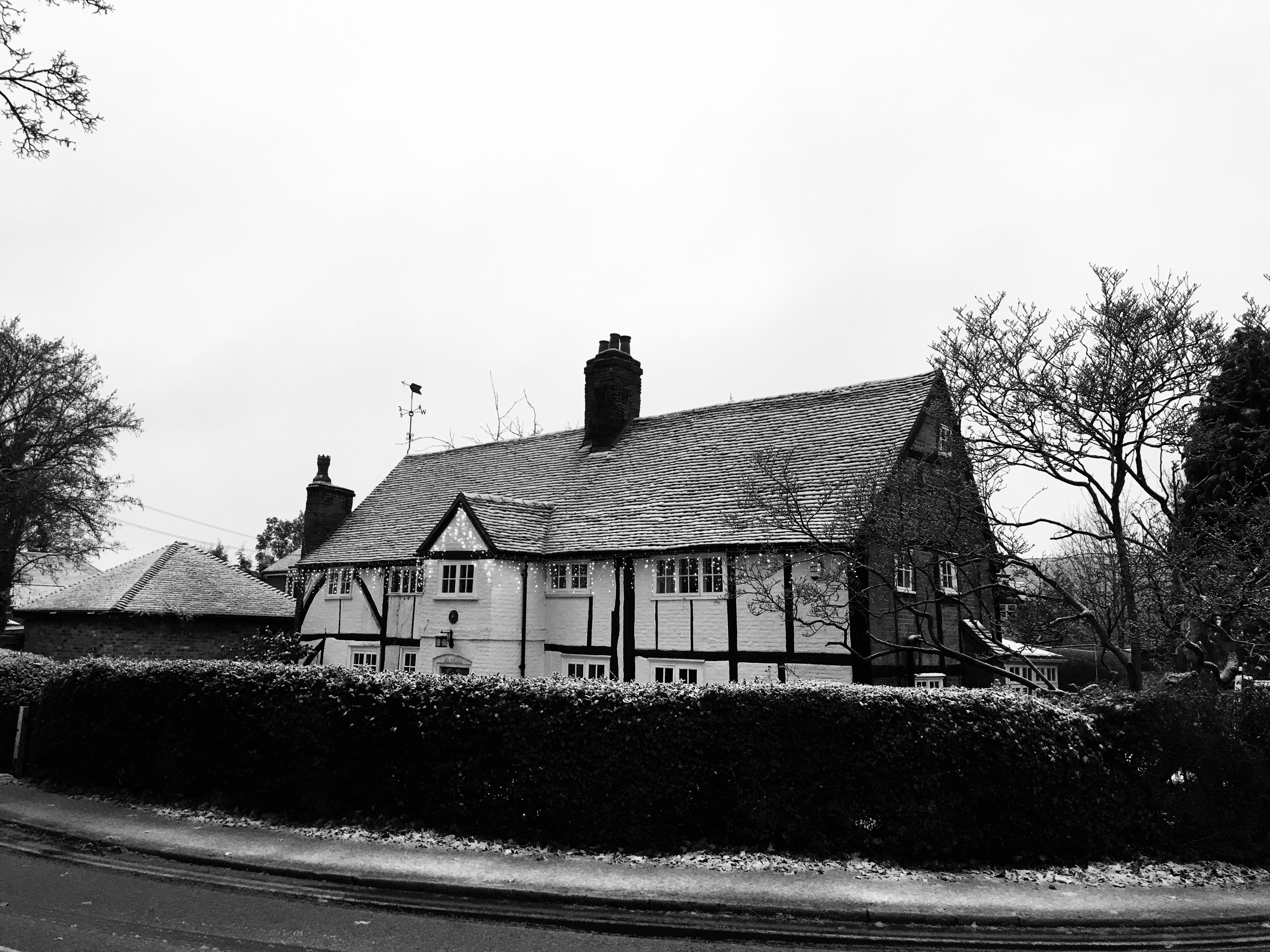
- The Cottage on a winter's day

- Location in Surrey
- 51°24′32″N 0°31′57″W
- Location: Thorpe, Surrey
- OS grid reference: TQ 02154 68789

History
- Built: 1490

Listed Building – Grade II*
- Official name: The Cottage
- Designated: 11 July 1951
- Reference no.: 1378051

The Cottage is the oldest home in Thorpe, Surrey, and dates from 1490 when Henry VII was king of England. Built when there was a plentiful supply of timber, it is a substantial timber-framed house with brick panels and during the last 500 years it has evolved and grown to what is now a quintessential English Chocolate Box Cottage.

Set slightly above the surrounding fields, bordered by rich woodland and close to the river, the Cottage occupies a site ideally suited to a nobleman in 1490. At the heart of the village, it has long been closely connected with local life. Its garden once housed the village forge and blacksmith’s workshop, while The Red Lion Inn stands next door and the former post office lies opposite.

== History ==
=== The original house ===
In 1490 the left hand side of the house was built using timber framing, brick panels and strong diagonal braces. A similar type of construction was used in one of the houses at the Weald and Downland Museum, Sussex. Because bricks were a relatively new way of building they were not yet trusted to take the whole weight of the house; this is why timber was used for the main strength of the house.

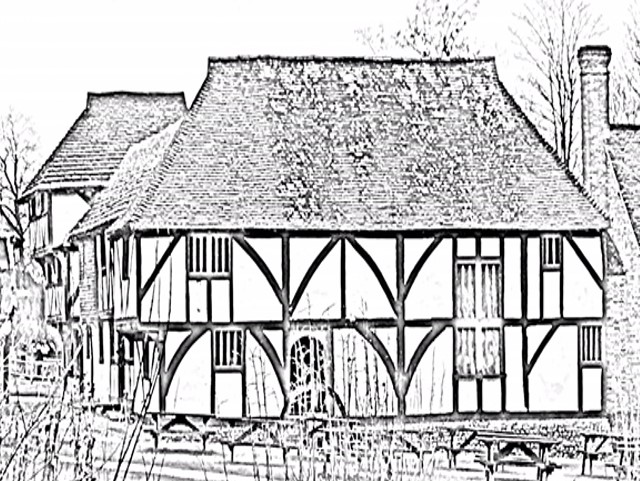
Timber-framed house with bracing, 1500s

The original timbers are thought to come from an earlier house on the site. The same type of carpenters' marks are on the rear timber frame and one of the main cross braces, suggesting that they were crafted by the same carpenter.

The original front door led into a large open room with a fire in the centre for cooking. This was open all the way to the roof. There is evidence of soot covering some of the timbers on the first floor. To the left were two domestic rooms and a room above.

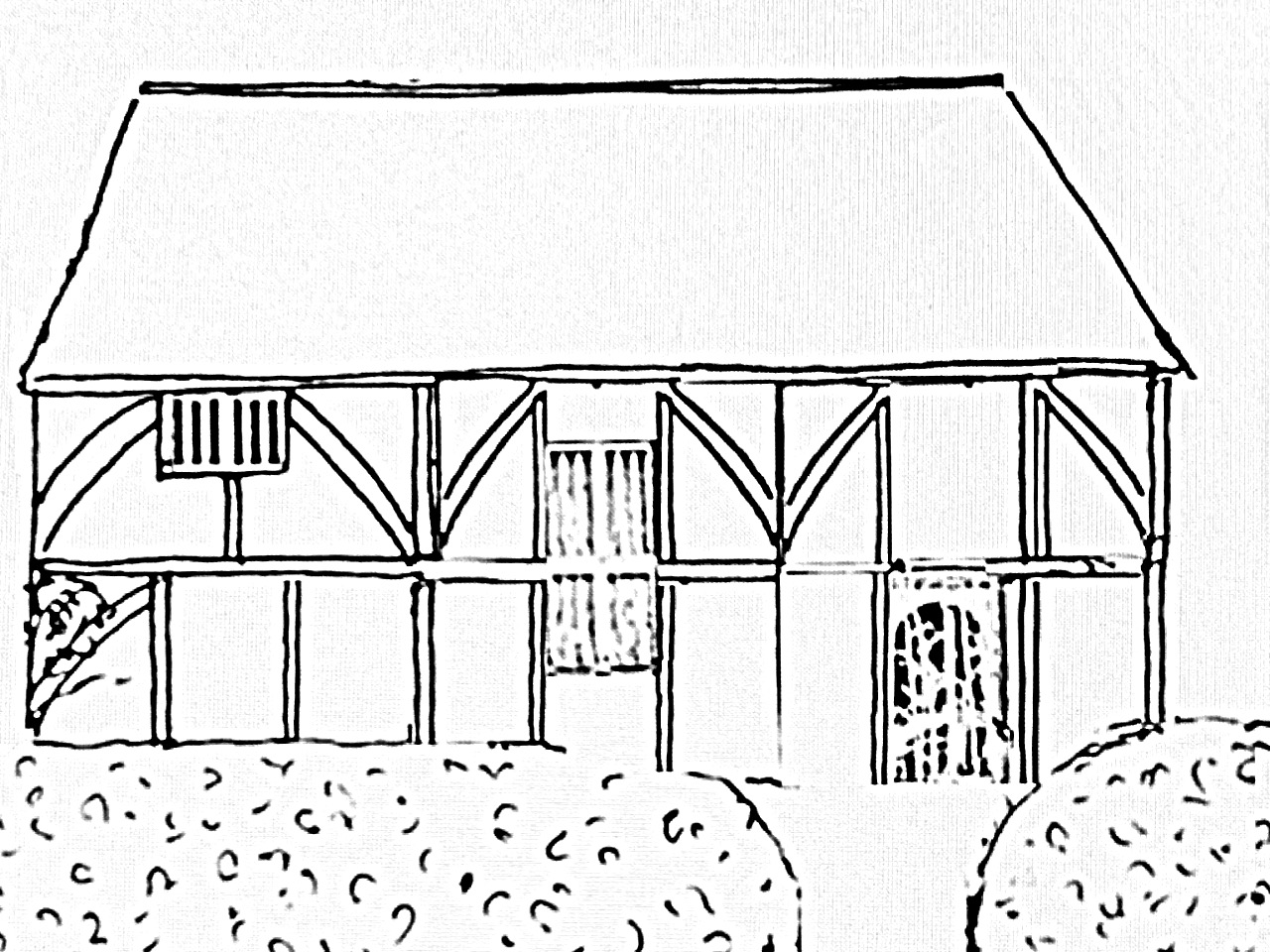
An impression of the Cottage in 1490

=== North extension ===
About 50 to 100 years later came the extension on the right hand side of the house. To the right of the porch is a double timber post - the left part of the post is the original Cottage, and the right part of the post marks where another whole house was added as the extension.

This second building was dismantled from elsewhere and rebuilt onto the Cottage as its extension. It is built in an earlier style - no cross bracing, just simple squares created from timber. This is likely to have been built much earlier before it was brought to the Cottage.

The original layout of this smaller house can be guessed from marks on the timbers - a two bay farmer's cottage with an internal jetty (overhanging first floor). In the corner would have been a ladder to get to the first floor, which had a single bedroom with a crown post roof. Another timber-framed house from the Weald and Downland museum has a similar construction with little or no diagonal bracing.

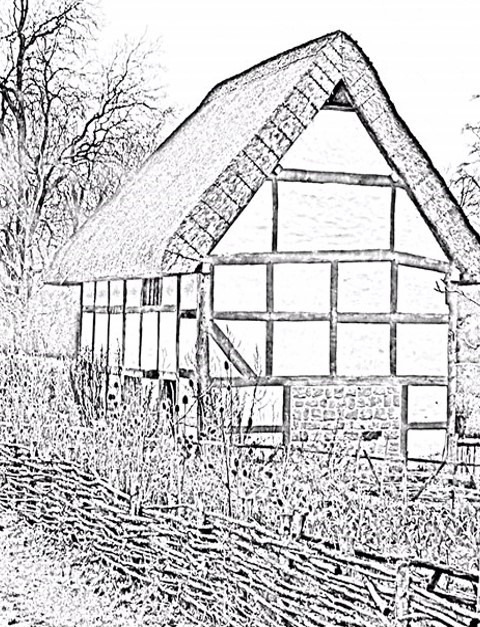
Timber-framed house with similar construction to the right part of the Cottage. Weal and Downland museum.

Looking at the Cottage from the front shows clearly the two different construction methods - bracing on the left, no bracing on the right.

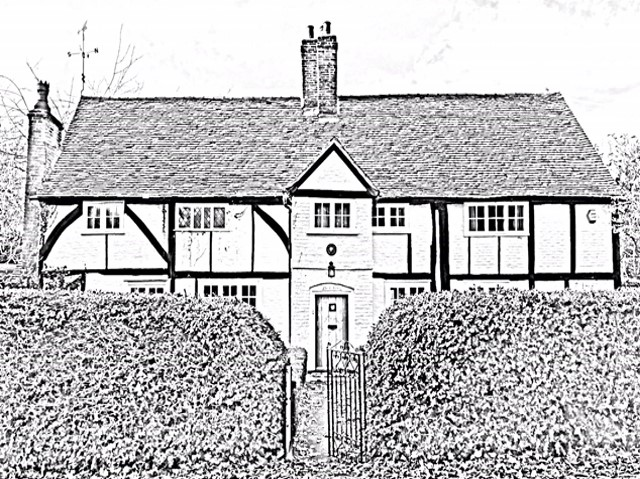
The Cottage showing the two construction methods - left side with bracing, right side with square timber panels

=== Improvements added in the 1500s ===
More improvements were added in the 1500s. Two fireplaces were built around a central chimney, providing one fire for the kitchen and one for a snug. Around this time, a staircase was at the back and floors were built to give more bedrooms upstairs.

=== Improvements added in the 1800s ===
Later the front porch was added. A 19th-century sales brochure mentions that the front porch could easily be converted into an entrance hall. This added symmetry to the building and improved the layout.

=== Improvements added in the 1900s ===
A bathroom was created inside. This may have been earlier but it is shown on early plans with Runnymede Council Planning Portal. A rear extension was made to the ground floor kitchen, with catslide roof. The roof space was converted, and a conservatory was added.

== English Heritage listing ==
In 1951 the Cottage was entered into the English Heritage list as a Grade II* listed building. The entry is:

Cottage. C16 with C18 additions. Timber framed hipped tiled roof. Two chimney stacks. Brick panels white painted. Two storeys. Projecting two storey gabled porch in centre. Double timber post to right. Large panels and braces. Plain boarded door. To left, three-light, 6-pane casement and two-light casement. To right, two 2-light casements. Above - 4-pane casement, to right and left two 3-light casements. Catslide roof at rear.

== Thorpe Village ==
Thorpe is a village in Surrey, England, between Egham and Chertsey and has been settled since the Bronze and Iron Ages. It has 28 listed buildings with three being of particular interest: St Mary's Church, Thorpe House and the Cottage are designated Grade II*.
