= Englefield Green =

Village in Surrey, England

Coordinates: 51.4301°N 0.5699°W

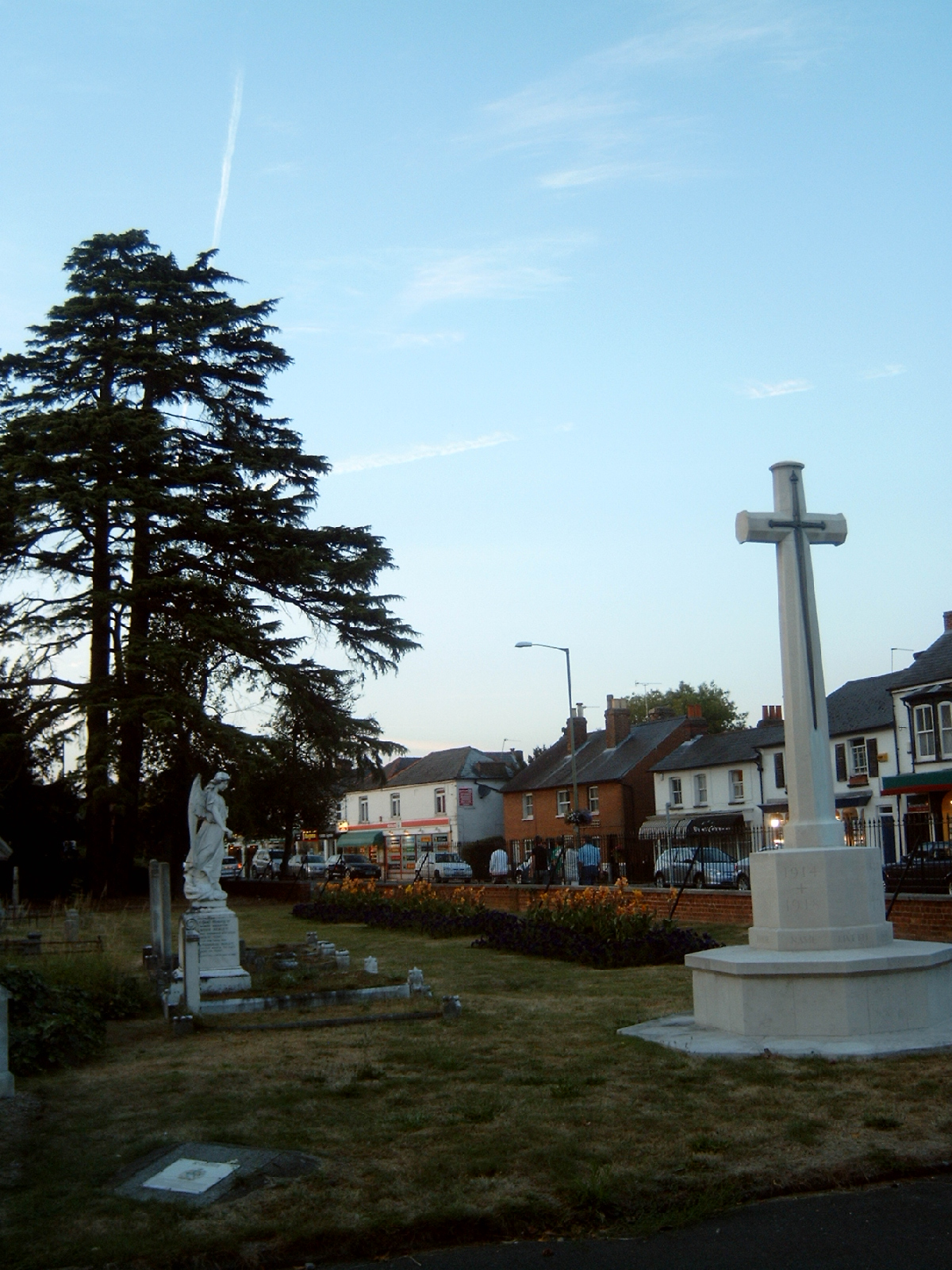
- The War Memorial and St. Judes Road shops in the village centre

- Location within Surrey
- Area: 9.21 km^{2} (3.56 sq mi)
- Population: 11,826 (2021 census)
  - Density: 1,284/km^{2} (3,330/sq mi)
- OS grid reference: SU995710
- District: Runnymede
- Shire county: Surrey
- Region: South East
- Country: England
- Sovereign state: United Kingdom
- Post town: Egham
- Postcode district: TW20
- Dialling code: 01784
- Police: Surrey
- Fire: Surrey
- Ambulance: South East Coast
- UK Parliament: Windsor

Englefield Green is a large village in the Borough of Runnymede, Surrey, England, approximately 20 miles (32 km) west of central London. It is home to Runnymede Meadow, The Commonwealth Air Forces Memorial, The Savill Garden, and Royal Holloway, University of London.

The village grew from a hamlet in the 19th century, when much of Egham (1 mile (1.6 km) to the east) was sold by the Crown Estate.

== History ==
The village grew from a hamlet and medieval farmed swathe of land, known as a tithing, of the same name, combined with was a much wider, that is eastern tranche of its area associated with the former Great South West Road and its neighbouring land known as Egham Hill, both in Egham in the 19th century, when much of its land, principally in the western half, was parted with by sale from the Great Park in the Crown Estate. Parts of it in the west remain Crown Estate, mainly the entire south-east quarter of the Great Park (that non-built-up land seen in the map, shown, which is not in neighbouring Berkshire).

=== The last duel in England ===
The last fatal duel in England took place on Priest Hill in 1852. It was between two French refugees, Lt. Frederic Constant Cournet and Emmanuel Barthélemy. Cournet was supposed to have been the better prepared for a sword duel. Barthelemy, an extremely questionable individual (responsible for at least two murders by 1852), manipulated Cournet into challenging him (supposedly over comments Cournet made about Barthelemy's girlfriend), and chose pistols for the weapon. He killed Cournet, and was subsequently arrested for murder. However, Barthelemy managed to convince the jury that it was not a homicide as in the normal sense of the word, and was acquitted. Barthelemy was widely suspected of being a spy for the new French regime of Emperor Louis Napoleon (Napoleon III). In fact his bullying of other refugees had led to the confrontation with Cournet. However, three years later, he was engaged in a crime in London, possibly involving a blackmail attempt that did not work out. Two men were killed and Barthelemy was arrested. Despite giving an image of bravado in court, this time he was convicted, then hanged. Most criminal historians and writers feel he was repugnant but he had a defender in Victor Hugo, who wrote a small panegyric to him in one of the later sections of Les Misérables, before ultimately also agreeing that "Barthelemy at all times flew one flag only, and it was black."

=== Air Forces Memorial ===
On the road north of the halls of residence is the Air Forces Memorial which commemorates by name over 20,000 airmen and women who were lost in the Second World War during operations from bases in the United Kingdom and North and Western Europe, and who have no known graves. They served in Bomber, Fighter, Coastal, Transport, Flying Training and Maintenance Commands, and came from all parts of the Commonwealth, as well as some from countries in continental Europe which had been overrun but whose airmen continued to fight in the ranks of the Royal Air Force. The names in their thousands are inscribed on panels in a courtyard.

The memorial sits on a hill overlooking the celebrated Thames meadow of Runnymede where Magna Carta, enshrining basic freedoms in English law, was signed in 1215. The memorial was designed by Sir Edward Maufe with sculpture by Vernon Hill. The engraved glass and painted ceilings were designed by John Hutton and the poem engraved on the gallery window was written by Paul H Scott. It overlooks the River Thames on Cooper's Hill at Englefield Green between Windsor and Egham on the A328 (Priest Hill), 4 miles from Windsor and is well signposted as 'Air Force Memorial'.

=== Runnymede Halls of Residence ===
Just north of the village proper are seven halls. These were last in use for education itself as the 'Runnymede campus' of Brunel University and before which by one of its forebears, Shoreditch College of Education. Today the site forms part of a luxury retirement village. The original halls were named after Shoreditch staff: Scrivens, Marshall, Bradley, Reed and Rowan save for President Hall, where the College president lived, and College Hall that were both named in its Royal Indian Engineering College period. Embellished Neo Gothic and similar style stone and brick mixture buildings, they were built by Sir Matthew Digby Wyatt, who had been Isambard Kingdom Brunel's architect for London Paddington station and Addenbrooke's Hospital, Cambridge, now the Judge Institute. Corridors in President and College Halls were named after prominent British and Anglo-Indian figures, such as George Canning, Warren Hastings, Richard Wellesley and Charles Cornwallis.

In 2007, Brunel advertised the buildings for sale. Royal Holloway looked for provision of a quota of student accommodation to complement its adjacent Kingswood Hall. In June 2007 it was acquired by developer Oracle for £46m (equivalent to £77,692,000 in 2025). Englefield Green Village Residents Association members voted to remind Runnymede Borough Council that any expansion of buildings should be in keeping with the village architecture and density as locally interpreted.

Gilbert's Statue of Eros on the Shaftesbury Memorial Fountain, Piccadilly Circus, was kept in the college during World War II.

== Demography ==
2011 Published Statistics: Population, home ownership and extracts from Physical Environment, surveyed in 2005
Output area	Homes owned outright	Owned with a loan	Socially rented	Privately rented	Other	km^{2} green space	km^{2} roads	km^{2} water	km^{2} domestic gardens	km^{2} domestic buildings	Usual residents	km^{2}
East (ward)	394	408	48	344	15	1.410	0.155	0.019	0.653	0.127	5,427	2.51
West (ward) (Note: Includes former halls in north-east.)	454	449	616	545	49	5.142	0.215	0.120	0.704	0.144	5,180	6.70

== Governance ==
Englefield Green is located in the Borough of Runnymede and Weybridge. It was represented in Parliament by former Conservative MP Philip Hammond from 1997 until his resignation in 2019. It is currently represented by Conservative MP Jack Rankin.

The village is divided into two wards for the purpose of Borough Council elections – East (Cllr Andrea Berardi, Cllr Trevor Gates) and West (Cllr Abby King, Cllr Eliza Kettle, Cllr Paul Gahir). The village is represented on Surrey County Council by Cllr Marisa Heath.

=== Borough Councillors ===
Italics indicate a by-election.

Election	Englefield Green West			Englefield Green East		
1976	J. Ellison (Con)	R. Thompson (Con)	R. Wykeham (Con)	P. Barry (Con)	C. Clarke (Con)	D. Head (Con)
1978	J. Ellison (Con)	R. Thompson (Con)	J. Fowles (Con)	P. Barry (Con)	C. Clarke (Con)	D. Head (Con)
1979	J. Ellison (Con)	S. Pert (Con)	J. Fowles (Con)	P. Barry (Con)	C. Clarke (Con)	D. Head (Con)
1980	B. Owen (Con)	S. Pert (Con)	J. Fowles (Con)	A. Willis (Con)	C. Clarke (Con)	D. Head (Con)
1982	B. Owen (Con)	S. Pert (Con)	J. Fowles (Con)	A. Willis (Con)	C. Clarke (Con)	D. Head (Con)
1983	B. Owen (Con)	S. Pert (Con)	J. Fowles (Con)	M. Gibbon (Con)	C. Clarke (Con)	D. Head (Con)
1984	B. Owen (Con)	S. Pert (Con)	Norman Rundell (Con)	M. Gibbon (Con)	C. Clarke (Con)	D. Head (Con)
1986	B. Owen (Con)	S. Pert (Con)	Norman Rundell (Con)	M. Gibbon (Con)	C. Clarke (Con)	Elsie Meany (Con)
1987	B. Owen (Con)	S. Pert (Con)	Norman Rundell (Con)	M. Gibbon (Con)	M. Johnstone (Con)	Elsie Meany (Con)
1988	B. Owen (Con)	S. Pert (Con)	Norman Rundell (Con)	C. Thorpe-Dixon (Con)	M. Johnstone (Con)	Elsie Meany (Con)
1990	B. Owen (Con)	S. Pert (Con)	Norman Rundell (Con)	C. Thorpe-Dixon (Con)	M. Johnstone (Con)	Elsie Meany (Con)
1991	B. Owen (Con)	Alec Collins (Con)	Norman Rundell (Con)	C. Thorpe-Dixon (Con)	M. Gray (Con)	Elsie Meany (Con)
1992	Michael Palmer (Con)	Alec Collins (Con)	Norman Rundell (Con)	E. Collins (Con)	M. Gray (Con)	Elsie Meany (Con)
1994	Michael Palmer (Con)	Alec Collins (Con)	William Holland (Lab)	E. Collins (Con)	M. Gray (Con)	Elsie Meany (Con)
1995	Michael Palmer (Con)	David Evans (Lab)	William Holland (Lab)	E. Collins (Con)	Norman Rundell (Con)	Elsie Meany (Con)
1996	Keith Thompson (Lab)	David Evans (Lab)	William Holland (Lab)	Alec Collins (Con)	Norman Rundell (Con)	Elsie Meany (Con)
1998	Keith Thompson (Lab)	David Evans (Lab)	Alan Clark (Lab)	Alec Collins (Con)	Norman Rundell (Con)	Carole Jones (Con)
1999	Keith Thompson (Lab)	Anthony Richardson (Con)	Alan Clark (Lab)	Alec Collins (Con)	Timothy Stones (Con)	Carole Jones (Con)
2000	Hugh Meares (Con)	Anthony Richardson (Con)	Carole Jones (Con)	Alec Collins (Con)	Timothy Stones (Con)	Kevin Walmsley (Con)
June 2001	Hugh Meares (Con)	Jeffrey Haas (Con)	Carole Jones (Con)	Alec Collins (Con)	Virginia Lenton-Smith (Con)	Kevin Walmsley (Con)
2002	Hugh Meares (Con)	Jeffrey Haas (Con)	Carole Jones (Con)	Alec Collins (Con)	Niall Thewlis (Con)	Kevin Walmsley (Con)
2003	Hugh Meares (Con)	Jeffrey Haas (Con)	Carole Jones (Con)	Alec Collins (Con)	Niall Thewlis (Con)	Kevin Walmsley (Con)
November 2003	Hugh Meares (Con)	Jeffrey Haas (Con)	Carole Jones (Con)	Marisa Heath (Con)	Niall Thewlis (Con)	Kevin Walmsley (Con)
2004	Hugh Meares (Con)	Jeffrey Haas (Con)	Carole Jones (Con)	Marisa Heath (Con)	Niall Thewlis (Con)	Kevin Walmsley (Con)
2006	Hugh Meares (Con)	Jeffrey Haas (Con)	Mike Kusneraitis (Con) (later Ind)	Marisa Heath (Con)	Niall Thewlis (Con)	Patrick Roberts (Con)
2007	Hugh Meares (Con)	Jack Perschke (Con)	Mike Kusneraitis (Con) (later Ind)	Marisa Heath (Con)	Daniel Hamilton (Con)	Patrick Roberts (Con)
2008	Hugh Meares (Con)	Jack Perschke (Con)	Mike Kusneraitis (Con) (later Ind)	Marisa Heath (Con)	Daniel Hamilton (Con)	Patrick Roberts (Con)
June 2009	Hugh Meares (Con)	Peter Taylor (Con)	Mike Kusneraitis (Con) (later Ind)	Marisa Heath (Con)	Daniel Hamilton (Con)	Patrick Roberts (Con)
2010	Hugh Meares (Con)	Peter Taylor (Con)	Mike Kusneraitis (Con) (later Ind)	Marisa Heath (Con)	Daniel Hamilton (Con)	Patrick Roberts (Con)
2011	Hugh Meares (Con)	Nick Prescot (Con)	Mike Kusneraitis (Con) (later Ind)	Marisa Heath (Con)	Peter Taylor (Con)	Patrick Roberts (Con)
2012	Hugh Meares (Con)	Nick Prescot (Con)	Mike Kusneraitis (Con) (later Ind)	Marisa Heath (Con)	Peter Taylor (Con)	Patrick Roberts (Con)
2014	Hugh Meares (Con)	Nick Prescot (Con)	Mike Kusneraitis (Con) (later Ind)	Marisa Heath (Con)	Peter Taylor (Con)	Patrick Roberts (Con)
2015	Hugh Meares (Con)	Nick Prescot (Con)	Mike Kusneraitis (Con) (later Ind)	Marisa Heath (Con)	Jap Sohi (Con)	Patrick Roberts (Con)
2016	Nigel King (Con)	Nick Prescot (Con)	Mike Kusneraitis (Con) (later Ind)	Marisa Heath (Con)	Jap Sohi (Con)	Patrick Roberts (Con)
2018	Nigel King (Con)	Nick Prescot (Con)	Mike Kusneraitis (Con) (later Ind)	Marisa Heath (Con)	Jap Sohi (Con)	Patrick Roberts (Con)
2019	Nigel King (Con)	Nick Prescot (Con)	Mike Kusneraitis (Con) (later Ind)	Marisa Heath (Con)	Jap Sohi (Con)	Seat abolished
Summer 2019	Nigel King (Con)	Nick Prescot (Con)	Mike Kusneraitis (Con) (later Ind)	Marisa Heath (Con)	Jap Sohi (Con)	Seat abolished
2021	Nigel King (Con)	Nick Prescot (Con)	Mike Kusneraitis (Con) (later Ind)	Marisa Heath (Con)	Jap Sohi (Con)	Seat abolished
2022	Nigel King (Con)	Nick Prescot (Con)	Abby King (Lab)	Marisa Heath (Con)	Andrea Berardi (Ind)	Seat abolished
2023	Eliza Kettle (Lab)	Nick Prescot (Con)	Abby King (Lab)	Trevor Gates (Ind)	Andrea Berardi (Ind)	Seat abolished
2024	Eliza Kettle (Lab)	Paul Gahir (Lab)	Abby King (Lab)	Trevor Gates (Ind)	Andrea Berardi (Ind)	Seat abolished

=== County Councillor ===
Election	Member	Party
2005	Carole Jones	Conservative
2006	Marisa Heath	Conservative

== Residents ==
Marilyn Monroe and Arthur Miller, then newlyweds, spent four months (mid-July to November) in 1956, including their honeymoon, in Parkside House, Englefield Green for the duration of Monroe's work on the film The Prince and the Showgirl with Laurence Olivier.

Saudi billionaire Walid Juffali owned Bishopsgate House and its 42-acre estate from about 2001 until his death in 2016. Leslie Charteris, author of the Simon Templar novels, spent the final years of his life at Corfield, Ridgemead Road, near the Barley Mow.

== Gallery ==
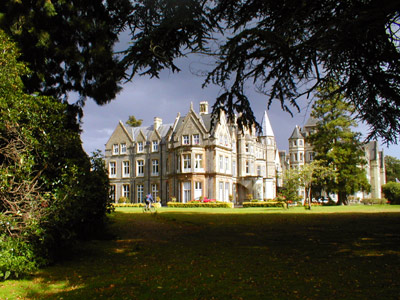
Brunel University's Runnymede Campus. The buildings visible are President & College Halls, designed by Sir Matthew Digby Wyatt

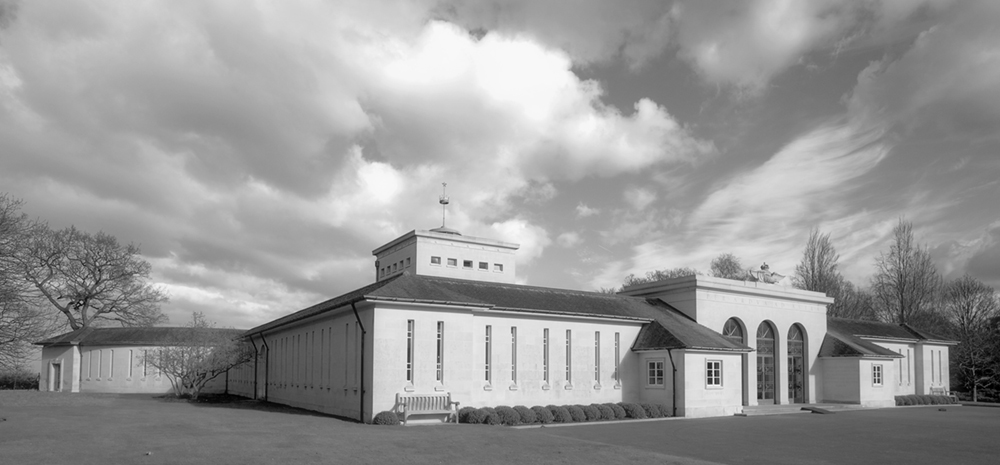
Commonwealth Air Forces Memorial

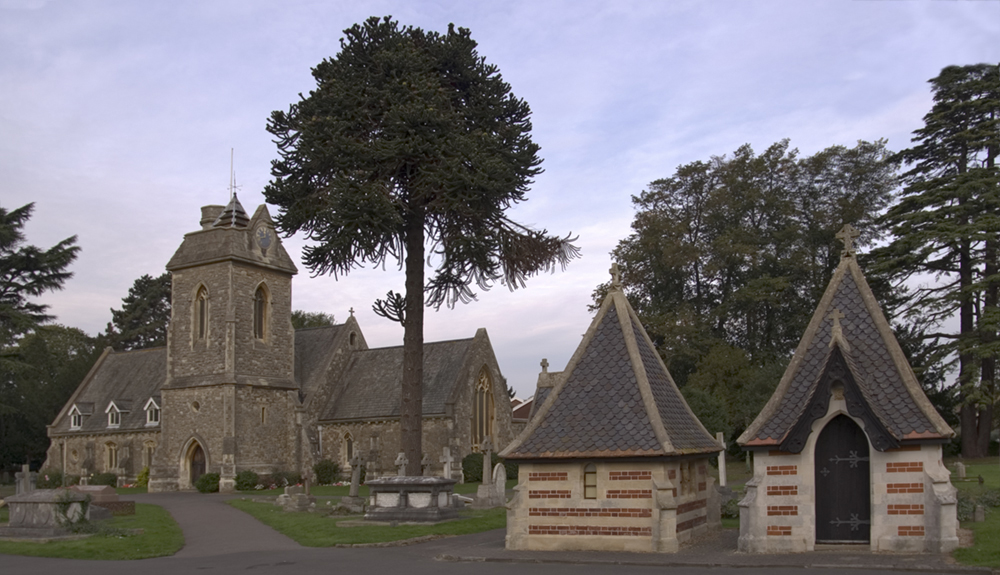
Church & Mausolea

== See also ==
- Church of Our Lady of the Assumption, Englefield Green

== Notes and references ==
References

== Sources ==
- Englefield Green in Pictures, by Graham Dennis (ISBN 0-9524194-0-8) Fernhurst Books (7 Nov 1994)
- Englefield Green Picture Book, by Graham Dennis (ISBN 0-9508234-6-5) Egham-by-Runnymede Historical Society (Nov 1992)
- Hamill interview
