= Ahmed Juffali =

Saudi businessman (1924–1994)

Sheikh Ahmed bin Abdullah Al Juffali
- Born: 1 January 1924; Mecca, Saudi Arabia
- Died: 6 May 1994 (aged 70); The Balearic Sea, Spain
- Spouse: Suad bint Ibrahim Al Husseini
- Parents: Abdullah bin Ibrahim Al Juffali (father); Madawi bint Ibrahim Al Obeid (mother)

Chairman of E. A. Juffali and Brothers
- Successor: Walid bin Ahmed Al Juffali
- Issue: Al-Walid; Khaled; Al-Maha; Tarek
Names
- Ahmed bin Abdullah bin Ibrahim bin Nasser Al Juffali
- House: Bani Khalid

Ahmed bin Abdullah bin Ibrahim Al Juffali (Arabic أحمد بن عبدالله بن إبراهيم الجفالي) (1 January 1924 – 20 July 1994), was a Saudi businessman, and the founder of E. A. Juffali and Brothers, the largest privately owned enterprise in Saudi Arabia.

He was the main founder of the Saudi central bank, the Saudi Arabian Monetary Authority (SAMA), and a member of the international advisory board of Chase Bank, and a board member of companies including Wells Fargo, and the International Business Machines Corporation (IBM).

== Early life and education ==
Ahmed was born in Mecca on 1 January 1924, into a family of vast wealth and secrecy from Unayzah, Al-Qassim. The Al-Juffali are members of Bani Khalid dynasty, rulers of Eastern Arabia during the early 1600s to the late 1800s after military defeats against the Saudis. The Family are most notable for being direct descendants of Khālid ibn al-Walīd.

Ahmed was the third and most favored son of Sheikh Abdullah bin Ibrahim Al Juffali. His mother is Madawi bint Ibrahim Al Obeid which was responsible for the education of her sons. Sheikh Ahmed had two elder brothers, Ibrahim and Ali, who were overseeing their fathers electricity empire, now known as Saudi Electricity Company.

Ahmed attended homeschool in his father’s historic palace in the centre of Mecca, where he was educated by a selection of financial scholars and merchants. Ahmed was particularly interested in the topic of bringing international companies to the local market. Shortly after Ahmed had accumulated the knowledge needed, he had a vision and together with his brothers, embarked on a journey to introduce multinational companies to Saudi Arabia.

Sheikh Ahmed developed great interest in various philanthropic and humanitarian causes. He launched multiple initiatives and programs that continue to serve various sectors of the community and participate in humanitarian development inside and outside the Middle East and neighboring Islamic countries. Ahmed was also fluent in three languages: Arabic, English, German. Sheikh Ahmed taught himself German in his youth as he would always carry a custom made German to Arabic dictionary.

== Business portfolio ==
Sheikh Ahmed founded E. A. Juffali and Brothers, together with his brothers Ibrahim and Ali Ahmed built a brand new gleaming office building in the middle of a desert wasteland in Jeddah, Saudi Arabia. It is occupied by Mercedes-Benz, Bosch, Dow Chemical, Fluor Corporation, Carrier, DuPont, Ericsson, IBM, Liebherr, Michelin, Nissan, Siemens Nabors Industries and many more.

== Humanitarian Projects ==
- The Help Centre:

The Help Centre is a philanthropic non-governmental and non-profit organization dedicated to the welfare of persons with intellectual disabilities, from as early as birth to young adulthood and beyond. We seek means by which we can empower and integrate our children to participate fully and assume a rightful place in society, thereby attaining a fair chance at life. The Help Center began operations in November 1985. It soon became apparent that many children with intellectual disabilities required special services that were not available in either the hospitals or regular school settings. These children needed to be taught by specialists who understood the complexities of their problems and who could devise programs to help them live and integrate as independents within the larger community.

== Personal life ==
Sheikh Ahmed had one wife, three sons and one daughter. He married Suad bint Ibrahim Al Husseini in the early-1970s from the Al-Husayni family. Suad is currently undertaking various philanthropic contributions. They have four children, three sons and one daughter:

- Al-Walid
- Khaled
- Tarek
- Al-Maha

== Death ==
On 20 July 1994, Sheikh Ahmed died on the Balearic Sea in his brand new 48 meter yacht "TATASU", after a sudden heart attack. His fortune is in the hands of his last surviving son, Khaled bin Ahmed Al Juffali.

== Ancestry ==
Ancestors of Ahmed Juffali

16. Breikan bin Jafal Al Juffali
8. Naser bin Breikan Al Juffali
4. Ibrahim bin Nasser Al Juffali
2. Abdullah bin Ibrahim Al Juffali
1. Ahmed bin Abdullah Al Juffali
3. Madawi bint Ibrahim Al Obeid
