= E. A. Juffali and Brothers =

Saudi holding company

E. A. Juffali and Brothers شركة إبراهيم الجفالي وإخوانه
- Company type: Private
- Founded: 1946; 80 years ago
- Headquarters: Jeddah, Saudi Arabia
- Key people: Khalid bin Ahmed Al Juffali, Chairman
- Number of employees: 59000 (2022)
- Website: https://juffali.com

Ebrahim A. Juffali and Brothers is Saudi Arabia's largest private enterprise. Founded in 1946, its expansion coincided with the country's growth, and by the mid 1970s, the Juffali Group had firmly established itself as the largest business house in the Middle East, with 49,218 employees worldwide.

Juffali was responsible for developing the first power generation (electricity), and telecommunication in Saudi Arabia as-well as television concessions. Later on the Al Juffali group introduced many other fields to Saudi Arabia such as power utilities, construction, insurance, telecommunications, and vehicle manufacturing and distribution.

The group's growth was steered in large part by Sheikh Ahmed bin Abdullah Al-Juffali (1924–1994). The company was later run by his sons, Sheikh Khaled Juffali and Sheikh Walid Al Juffali (1955–2016) and supported by professional staff managing a wide range of investments, manufacturing, finance, real estate, distribution, and oil drilling throughout the Middle East, Europe, Asia, and North America.

== Subsidiaries ==
The following companies are subsidiaries of Juffali Group:

- Arabian Metal Industries Co.
- Saudi Refrigerators Manufacturing Co.
- Juffali Air Ducts and Accessories Plant
- Gulf Acrylic Manufacturing Co.
- Juffali Low Tension Factory
- Juffali Tyres Retreading Factory
- National Automobile Industry Co.
- Saudi Tractors Manufacturing Co.
- Saudi Building Systems Manufacturing Co.
- Saudi Air-conditioning Manufacturing Co.
- Arabian Chemical Company (Polystyrene)
- Arabian Chemical Company “Latex”
- Juffali Automotive Company(JACO)
