= Rusham Park =

Industrial site in Egham, Surrey, England

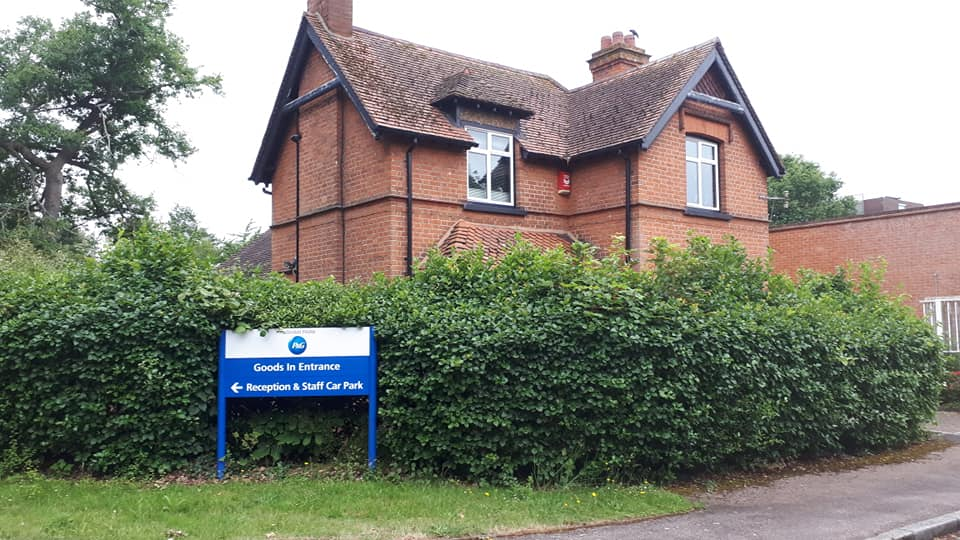
- North Entrance

- Location within Surrey
- 51°24′58″N 0°32′42″W
- Location: Egham, Surrey, England
- OS grid reference: TQ 00564 70069

History
- Built: c. 1900

Rusham Park is an industrial site in Egham, Surrey, England. It was formally owned by Shell, Richardson Vicks, and Procter & Gamble. It is now owned by Royal Holloway University. It was named after Rusham Farm.

The four-acre site consists of ten buildings built, giving it a collegiate look. It also contains gardens, green space and a multi-story carpark.

The university is pursuing an alternative-use redevelopment strategy.

== History ==
From 1956 through to about 1975, Shell Central Laboratories consolidated combustion research to Rusham Park. From 1960, this included a combustion laboratory, built by architects Walker Howard and Cranswick.

Richardson Vicks International moved into the site circa 1980. Norwich Eaton Pharmaceuticals was also based on the site.

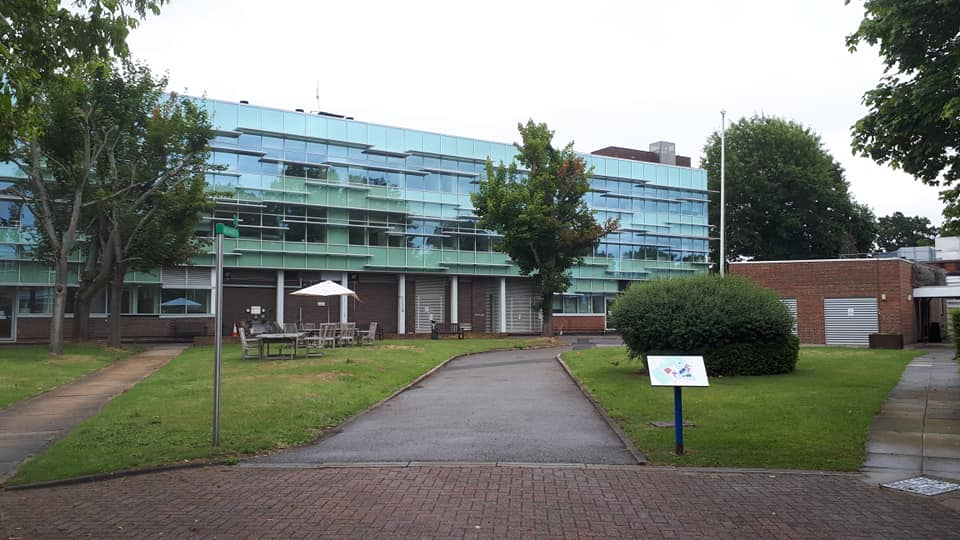
A view of a P&G lab building.

Procter & Gamble acquired RVI in Autumn 1985. During the time P&G owned it, it was called Egham Technical Centre, Rusham Park Technical Centre, London Innovation Centre, and Greater London Innovation Centre. In July 2015, P&G sold 43 of its beauty brands to Coty and Coty became a major tenant of the site.

=== Royal Holloway University ===
Royal Holloway acquired the site in July 2016, but leased it back to P&G and Coty.
