= Khaled Juffali =

Saudi businessman (born 1958)

- Born: Khaled bin Ahmed Al Juffali; 1 January 1958 (age 68)
- Citizenship: Saudi
- Education: Brummana High School; Institut Le Rosey
- Alma mater: University of San Diego
- Occupation: Businessman
- Known for: Vice chairman of E. A. Juffali and Brothers
- Spouse: Olfat Al-Mutlaq Juffali
- Children: 4
- Parent: Ahmed Abdullah Juffali
- Relatives: Walid Juffali (brother)

Khaled Juffali (born 1 January 1958) (Arabic: خالد الجفالي), is a Saudi businessman.

== Early life and education ==
Juffali was born in Jeddah on 1 January 1958. He is the second son of the founder of E. A. Juffali and Brothers, Ahmed Juffali His mother is Suad bint Ibrahim Al Husseini the grand daughter of Kamil of Jerusalem and niece of Amin al-Husseini. Khaled had two full-brothers: Walid Juffali, and Tarek Ahmed Al Juffali.

Juffali was educated in Lebanon and Switzerland, before earning a degree in business administration from the University of San Diego. He was given an honorary doctorate in business administration from Menlo College in 2009.

== Career ==
Juffali is a managing partner and vice chairman at E. A. Juffali and Brothers. He is also the chairman of the Khaled Juffali Company (KJC), a privately held investment company, and of the Saudi German Business Council. He sits on the board of directors of the Saudi Arabian Monetary Authority, and the boards of numerous investment companies.

Juffali is chairman of ReAya Holding, Saudi Tractors Manufacturing, National Automobile Industry, Saudi Ericsson Communications, Fluor Daniel Arabia, and Raychem Saudi Arabia.

== Personal life ==
He is married to fellow Saudi, Olfat Al-Mutlaq Juffali, and they have four children together. In September 2018, he purchased Cypriot citizenship through a Cyprus government citizenship-by-investment programme.
