= Egham =

Town in Surrey, England

Coordinates: 51.429°N 0.548°W

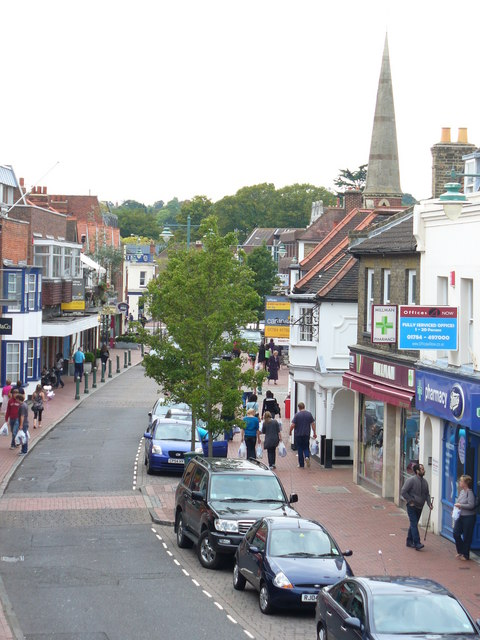
- High Street, Egham

- Location within Surrey
- Area: 2.64 km^{2} (1.02 sq mi)
- Population: 7,310 (2021 Census: Egham Town ward, see also Egham Hythe)
  - Density: 2,769/km^{2} (7,170/sq mi)
- OS grid reference: TQ008712
  - London: 19.3 miles (31.1 km)
- District: Runnymede
- Shire county: Surrey
- Region: South East
- Country: England
- Sovereign state: United Kingdom
- Post town: EGHAM
- Postcode district: TW20
- Post town: STAINES-UPON-THAMES
- Postcode district: TW18
- Dialling code: 01784
- Police: Surrey
- Fire: Surrey
- Ambulance: South East Coast
- UK Parliament: Runnymede and Weybridge

Egham (/ˈɛɡəm/ EG-əm) is a town in the Borough of Runnymede in Surrey, England, approximately 19 miles (31 km) west of central London. First settled in the Bronze Age, the town was under the control of Chertsey Abbey for much of the Middle Ages. In 1215, Magna Carta was sealed by King John at Runnymede, to the north of Egham, having been chosen for its proximity to the King's residence at Windsor. Under the Dissolution of the Monasteries in the early 16th Century, the major, formerly ecclesiastical, manorial freehold interests in the town and various market revenues passed to the Crown.

In the 17th and 18th centuries, Egham became a stop on coaching routes between London and many places to the west. The importance of this shrank from the building of the Western and South Western Railways but was for many decades offset by the stark growth in the population of London and the country at large. Egham station was opened in 1856 on the line from Waterloo to Reading and services are operated today by South Western Railway. The town is west of the M25 motorway, accessible via junction 13.

The campus of Royal Holloway, University of London is 1 mile (2 km) to the west of Egham town centre, close to Englefield Green.

== History ==
Egham predates c.670 AD when Chertsey Abbey was founded; one of the earliest Chertsey charters mentions Egeham. The place-name means "Ecga's farm".

Egham appears in the Domesday Book of 1086 as Egeham. It was held by Chertsey Abbey and kept by that institution after the conquest when its assets were: 15 hides; 12 ploughlands, 120 acres (49 hectares) of meadow, together with woodland, 'herbage and pannage' worth 75 hogs. It rendered one of the largest sums in Surrey to its feudal overlords per year, £30 10s 0d.

The village of Egham was, before 19th-century losses, an ancient parish covering land totalling 7,435 acres (30 km^{2}) in the counties of Berkshire (briefly) and Surrey; incorporating Egham, Egham Hill, Cooper's Hill, Englefield Green, Virginia Water, Shrubs Hill, Runnymede, Egham Hythe, and a considerable portion of Windsor Great Park. In the medieval period it was divided into four roughly equal tythings:

- Hythe (which was on fairly similar boundaries to Egham Hythe)
- Town
- Strode (later also known as Stroude), but which now denotes a much smaller, and inconsistent area
- Englefield, which is partly Englefield Green, partly Virginia Water

The manor of Egham, which includes Runnymede, belonged formerly and in 1215 to Chertsey Abbey, and after the Dissolution of the Monasteries (around 1540) became the property of the Crown, though granted to various tenants (holders) at different times.

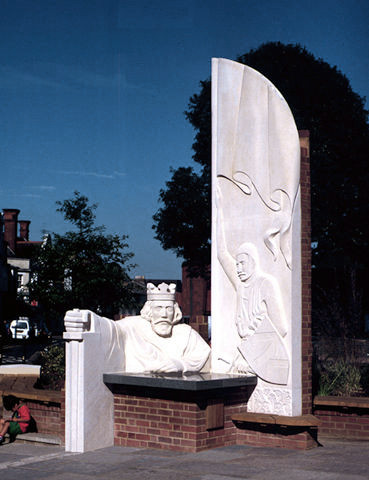
King John sculpture by David Parfitt, also showing Robert Fitzwalter at right

Magna Carta was sealed at nearby Runnymede in 1215, and is commemorated by a memorial, built in 1957 by the American Bar Association, at the foot of Cooper's Hill (a small rise adjacent to the Thames floodplain, immortalised in verse by poets including John Denham ("Cooper's Hill") and Alexander Pope ("Windsor Forest")). A sculpture by artist David Parfitt portraying King John and Robert Fitzwalter in the act of sealing Magna Carta can be found in Church Road in the centre of town.

Another memorial at the top of the hill in nearby Englefield Green, the Air Forces Memorial commemorates Commonwealth air force personnel killed during the Second World War but who have no known grave. It was the first new-built British building to be listed in the post-war era. The memorial is administered by the Commonwealth War Graves Commission and freely open to the public year-round. It has excellent views towards London, Windsor and the Surrey Hills, as well as being a place of quiet contemplation and reflection.

Egham Inclosure Act 1814
- Act of Parliament
- Parliament of the United Kingdom
- Long title: An Act for inclosing Lands in the Parish of Egham, in the County of Surry.
- Citation: 54 Geo. 3. c. cliii

Dates
- Royal assent: 17 June 1814

Text of statute as originally enacted

Egham at one time held horse races which took place at the Runnymede meadow, which interfered with the Egham Inclosure Act 1814 (54 Geo. 3. c. cliii) and the consequent award made in 1817, which divided up the meadow, as the act stipulated that any enclosures which should interfere with the holding of Egham races at the end of August upon its usual course must be removed every year. In 1836 the races were presided over by William IV, who gave a plate to be run for at the meeting, which coincided with festivities at Windsor for his daughter's marriage. The races ceased in 1884.

Other than two forming the hub of today's Virginia Water (including Wentworth), the principal properties were 'Egham Manor and Park', 'Egham Wick', 'Kenwolde Court', 'Markwood', 'Kingswood' and 'Alderhurst' for a time home of Lord Thring.

Parts of Egham have featured in national and international news in the 21st century. On 12 September 2007 a case of foot-and-mouth disease was found in Egham, 12 miles (19 km) from the previous outbreak found in early August 2007. Occasional flooding of Runnymede and parts of Egham Hythe have taken place following exceptional Thames Valley winter rainfall. Units of the army were deployed to assist with defences and dealing with damage from flooding in the 2013-14 winter storms.

== Governance ==
Egham once lay within the Godley hundred, which lay in the early medieval period within Windsor Forest in a part of it which was subject to a long-running dispute as to whether it lay within the historic county boundaries of Surrey or Berkshire.

Egham Rural District was a Local Government District within the administrative county of Surrey. It was created in 1894 and replaced in 1906 with Egham Urban District, which was later abolished in 1974. Since 1974, Egham has been part of the Runnymede borough of Surrey.

Egham is situated within the Runnymede and Weybridge (UK Parliament constituency) which has been consistently a Conservative Party (UK) hold over the last several General elections in the United Kingdom.

== Geography ==
Nearby are Staines-upon-Thames, Bagshot, Sunningdale, Englefield Green and Virginia Water, Windsor Great Park, Old Windsor and Windsor itself. The area between Egham and Staines town centres is known as Egham Hythe.

North of Egham is Wraysbury, home of the British Disabled Waterski Association. South is Thorpe Park, a large theme park of rides and attractions. Also near Egham is Ascot Racecourse.

== Economy ==
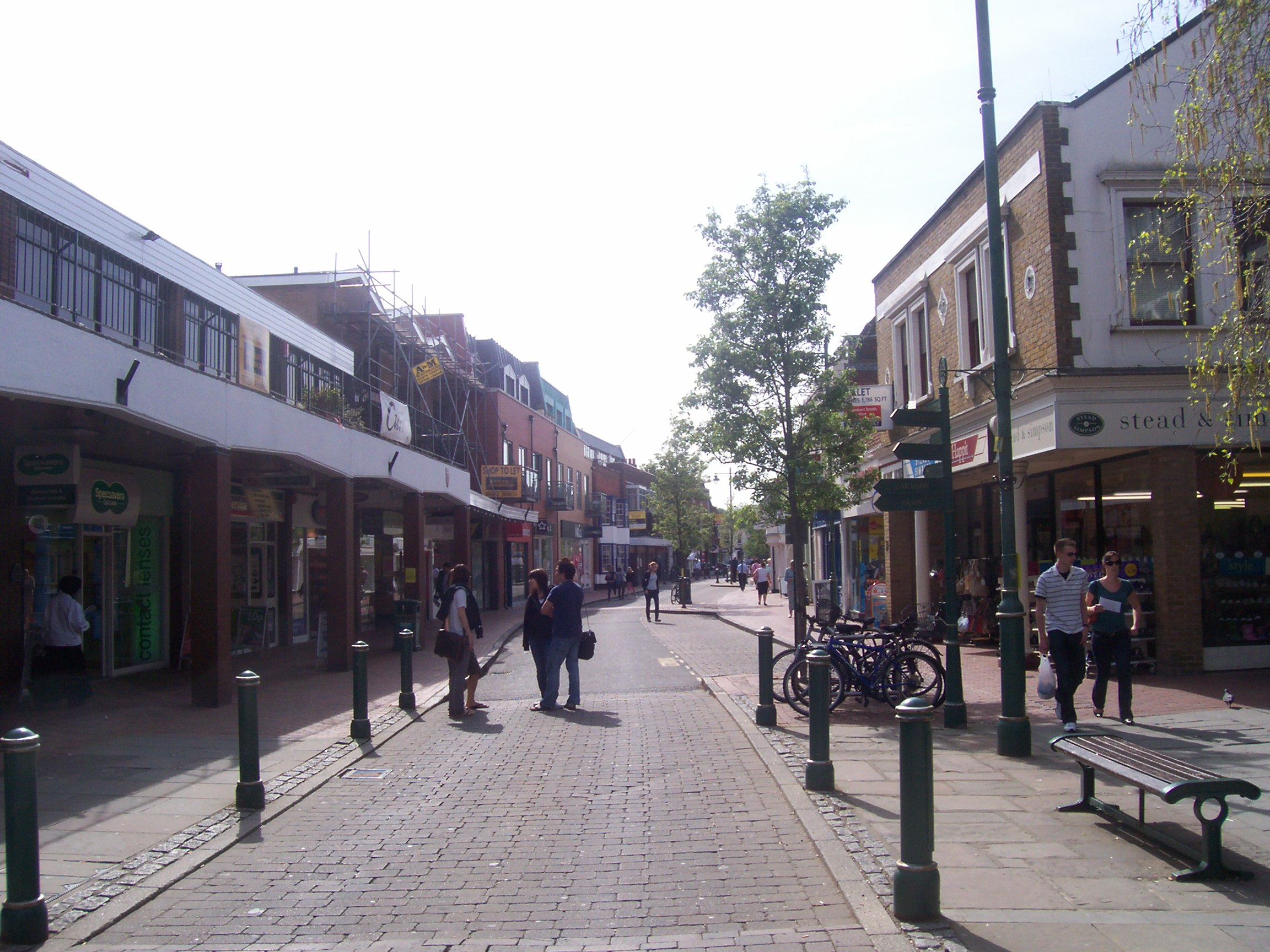
Egham High Street

Egham was home to a large research centre for Procter & Gamble, the London Innovation Centre, on Rusham Park, formally owned by Shell oils. P&G had over 550 employees in Egham, working on Fine Fragrance, Beauty Care and Health Care brands, such as Hugo Boss, Olay, and Vicks although in May 2012 P&G announced plans to shed 125 of these jobs. The site has now been purchased by Royal Holloway. Other notable employers include HCL AXON (an information technology consultancy), Belron (parent company of Autoglass), the EMEA Headquarters of Future Electronics, and the European headquarters of Enterprise Holdings; parent company of the Enterprise Rent-a-Car, Alamo, and National vehicle rental companies. Egham is also home to CAB International Europe UK, which holds one of the world's largest collections of microorganisms and the HQ of Spectris PLC, a supplier of precision instrumentation and controls with 8900 employees worldwide.

Egham and the eastern part of its historic parish, Egham Hythe, share connections with the development and enhancement of prestige sports cars. Egham has been Ferrari's spiritual home in the United Kingdom in the listed Tower Garage. Lagonda was based here. Egham today contains a Ferrari and a Porsche dealership.

== Sport and leisure ==
Egham has a Non-League football club, Egham Town F.C., who were promoted as Champions from the Combined Counties football league in the 2012–13 season and are now established in the Southern League Central division. Egham Town F.C. plays in the 5,500 seat Runnymede Stadium, Wards Place just beyond the Pooley Green playing field on Thorpe Lea Road.

Egham Cricket Club is a club with several sides and an academy grouped into four age groups from age 11. This dates to 1913 and is in Vicarage Road, just south of the railway line and within the Thorpe Lea outlying neighbourhood of Egham.

A rowing club, Staines Boat Club, is on the Egham side of Staines Bridge in the associated neighbourhood (postally), Egham Hythe.

Egham is home to Egham Fencing Club, a club founded in 1976 dedicated to the sport of fencing. The club has members practicing all three weapons (Sabre, Foil and Épée).

The Egham Royal Show takes place every August. 23–24 August 2014 was the 156th show.

Egham Orbit parkrun takes place at the Egham Orbit Leisure Centre at 9am every Saturday morning.

== Museum ==
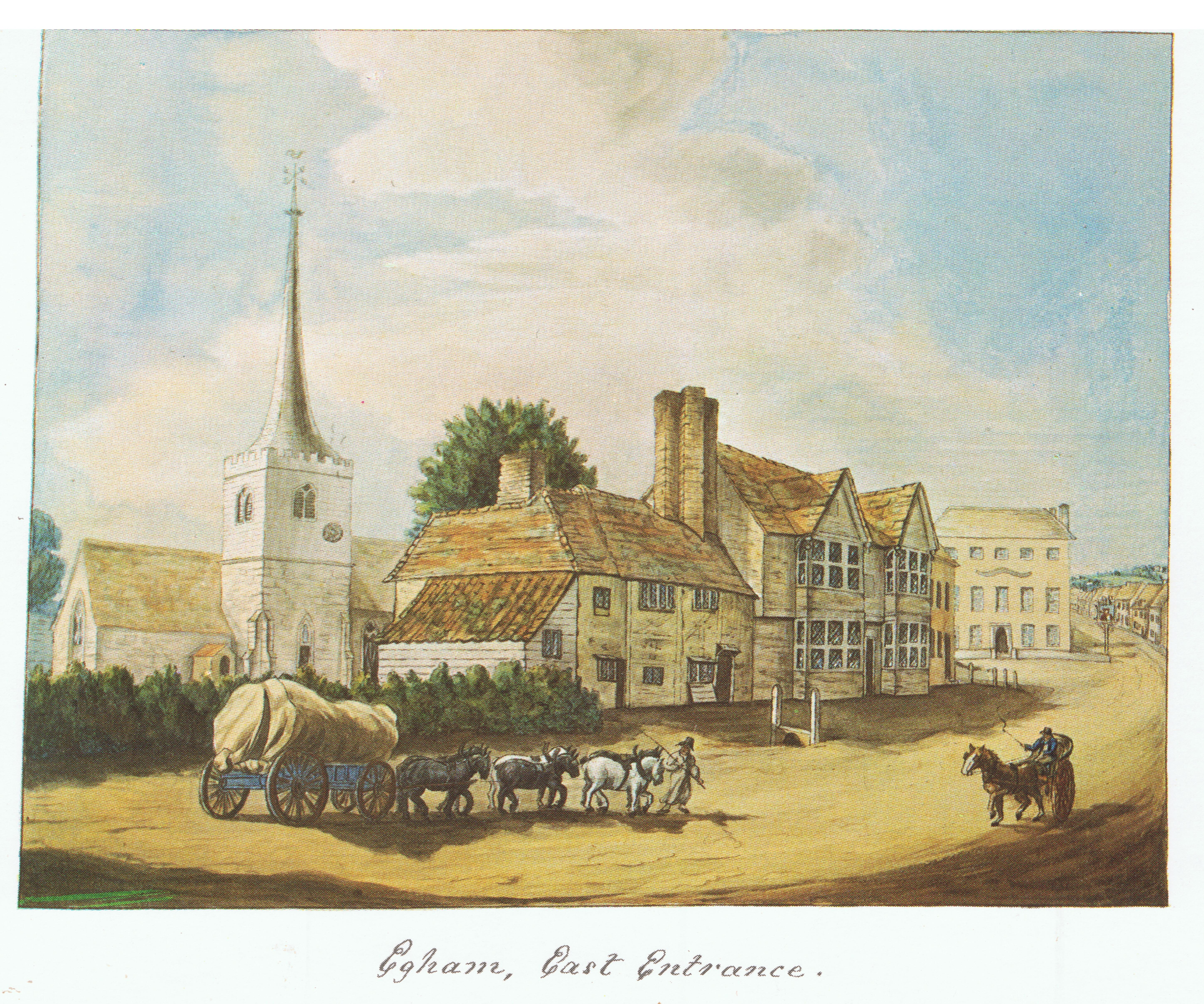
Watercolour of eastern entrance to Egham, pre. 1817.

The Egham Museum is a small museum based in the Literary Institute, telling the story of the region from pre-history to the present day.

The museum was established in 1968 as part of an independent community movement in response to developments and demolitions along the High Street. It covers the wider area of the previous Egham Urban District, including Egham, Egham Hythe, Englefield Green, Thorpe, and Virginia Water. As well as the more well known local stories, such as Magna Carta and Royal Holloway, the Egham Museum also features information about the area's entire past, from prehistoric to the present day.

The museum hosts workshops in schools across the catchment, has an active digital and outreach offer, and contains a large collection of artefacts, thousands of which are not on display.

== Transport ==
Egham railway station is on the railway lines from London Waterloo station to Reading and Weybridge. Passenger services are operated by South Western Railway. Egham has three level crossings. Two bus routes connect the town and Royal Holloway to Staines-upon-Thames, Windsor and London Heathrow Airport.

== Education ==
Strode's College is an institution in Egham dating back to 1706 and was a grammar school before being designated a sixth form college in 1975.

Royal Holloway, University of London is south of Egham along the A30 road at Englefield Green. It provided accommodation for London 2012 competitors who competed at Eton Dorney.

The Magna Carta School, formerly Hythe County Secondary and Egham Hythe Secondary Modern, is a comprehensive school in Egham Hythe. ACS International Schools has a campus in Egham.

== Magna Square Town redevelopment ==
Formally known as "Egham Gateway West", a redevelopment of Egham's town centre is underway with the goal to modernise and rejuvenate the historic town centre.

The development will deliver 34 affordable for rent homes, 67 market rate sale or rent apartments, Student accommodation, retail and restaurant units along with an Everyman Cinema.

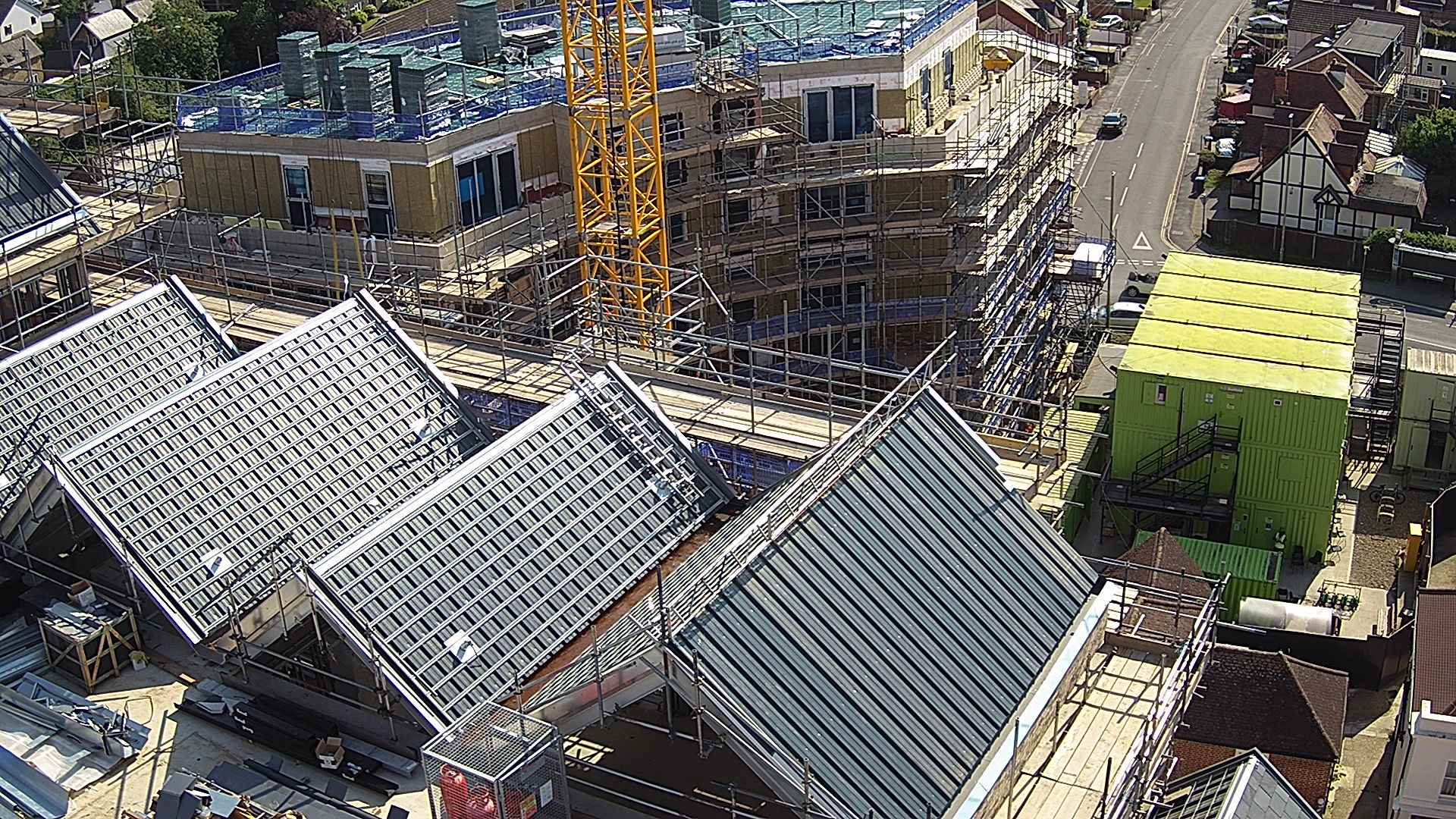
Construction progress as of 20 July 2021 on the Magna Square Development.

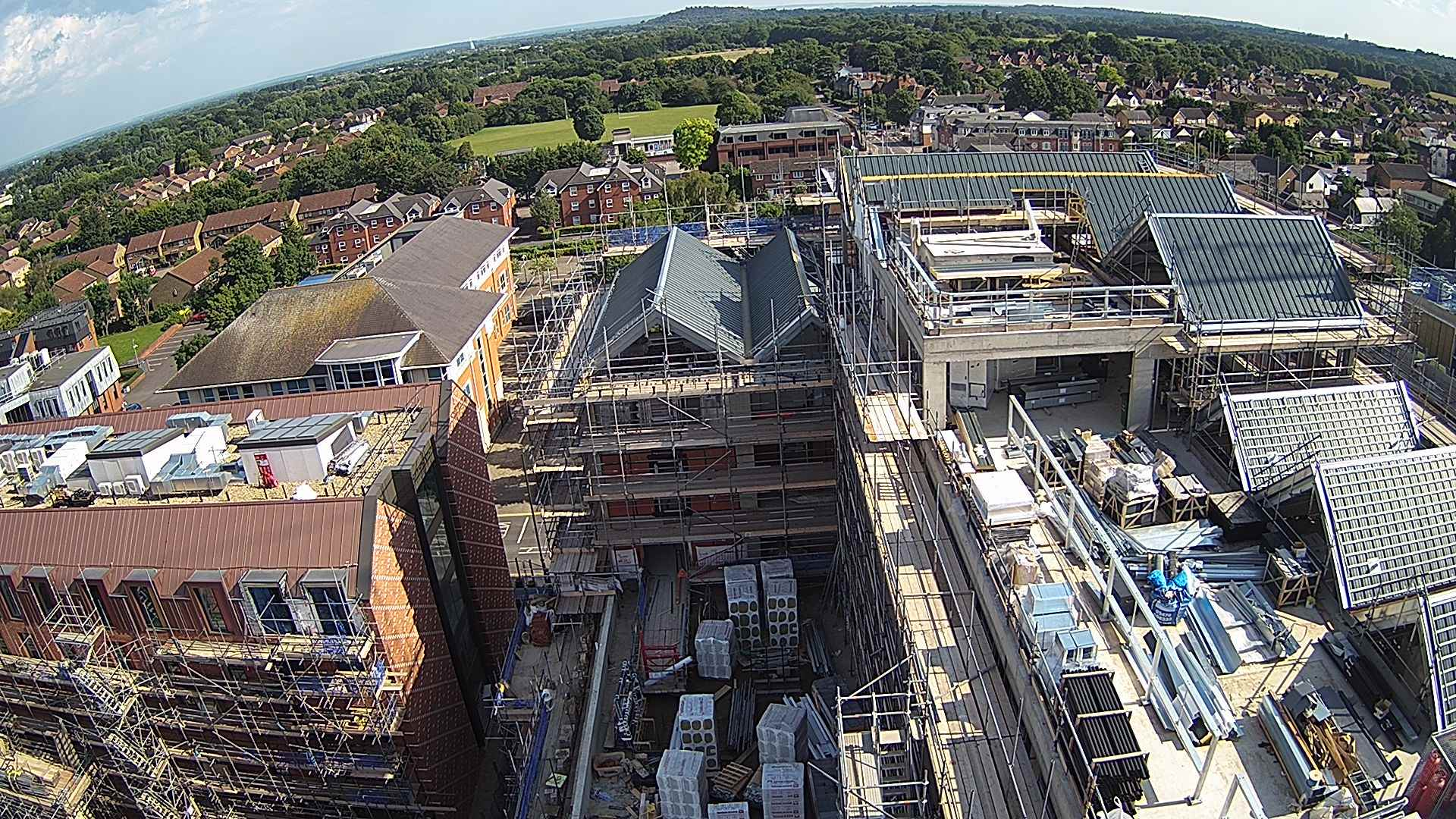
Alternative view showing construction progress as of 20 July 2021 on the Magna Square Development.

Expected to be completed in January 2022, the project is being managed by ‘Places for People’ on behalf of Runnymede Borough Council. While working alongside development partner Graham, which secured a £60 million contract to construct the development. When completed it will offer over 1300sqm of retail space.

== Churches ==
St John's Church Egham is on Church Road, and is an evangelical Anglican church in the Diocese of Guildford.

The Church of Our Lady of the Assumption is a Catholic church on Harvest Road in Englefield Green. It was built from 1930 to 1931 and designed by Joseph Goldie. It serves the Parish of St. Cuthbert which includes the Catholic Chaplaincy to the nearby Royal Holloway of the University of London.

The United Church of Egham is a local union of the Methodist Church and the United Reformed church. It occupies a Victorian building in the centre of Egham High Street.

Runnymede Christian Fellowship is a Pentecostal church meets at Coopers Hall, Strodes College, Egham based at Virginia Lodge, Heritage Court, Egham.

== Community radio ==
Insanity Radio 103.2FM is a local radio station with studios in Egham. It is owned jointly by Royal Holloway, University of London and its associated Students' Union, and run by students of the university as well as local volunteers. It provides entertainment, topical, and educational content aimed primarily at young people in the area, and works to develop relations between student and non-student residents of the town.

== Demography and housing ==
2011 Census Homes
Output area	Detached	Semi-detached	Terraced	Flats and apartments	Caravans/temporary/mobile homes	shared between households
Egham - UK ward	500	932	438	836	1	2

The average level of accommodation in the region composed of detached houses was 28%, the average that was apartments was 22.6%.

2011 Census Key Statistics
Output area	Population	Households	% Owned outright	% Owned with a loan	hectares
Egham - UK ward	6,384	2,709	26.9	29.6	264

The proportion of households in the civil parish who owned their home outright compares to the regional average of 5.1%. The proportion who owned their home with a loan compares to the regional average of 326.5%. The remaining % is made up of rented dwellings (plus a negligible % of households living rent-free).

== Notable people ==
- Ruth Bowyer, convict and member of Australia's First Fleet
- Hilda Braid, actor, lived in Egham
- Edward Budgen, provisions merchant, resided in Egham
- William Chaloner, counterfeiter, ran a coining operation in Egham.
- John Denham, who wrote poetry about Egham in the 17th century, and his father, also John Denham, an eminent judge
- Charles de Worms, chemist and lepidopterist
- Frederick James Furnivall, co-creator of the Oxford English Dictionary
- Hugh Reginald Haweis, cleric and writer
- Frank Muir, comedy writer and broadcast personality lived in Egham towards the end of his life.
