= Walid Juffali =

Saudi businessman (1955–2016)

Sheikh Al-Walid bin Ahmed Al Juffali
- Born: 30 April 1955; Jeddah, Saudi Arabia
- Died: 20 July 2016 (aged 61); Zürich, Switzerland
- Education: Le Rosey
- Alma mater: University of San Diego; Imperial College London
- Known for: Chairman, E. A. Juffali and Brothers
- Spouses: Basma Al-Sulaiman (1980–2000) Christina Estrada (2001–14); Loujain Adada (m. 2012)
- Children: 6
- Parents: Ahmed Abdullah Juffali (father); Suad bint Ibrahim Al Husseiniah (mother)
- Relatives: Khaled bin Ahmed Al Juffali (brother)
- Awards: Order of Merit of the Federal Republic of Germany; The Star of Palestine; Grand Cordon; Order of the Elephant; Order of Saint Sylvester

Walid Ahmed Juffali (30 April 1955 – 20 July 2016) (Arabic: وليد أحمد الجفالي) or Al-Walid bin Ahmed bin Abdullah bin Ibrahim Al Juffali (Arabic الوليد بن أحمد بن عبدالله الجفالي) was the chairman of E. A. Juffali and Brothers, the largest privately owned enterprise in Saudi Arabia, assuming office after the death of his father Ahmed bin Abdullah Al Juffali, Juffali was also the chair of his own personal company "W Investments" a privately held investment company which mainly operated in Zürich.

He was also the chairman of Saudi American Bank, The Saudi Cement Company, and sat on the boards of numerous powerful companies, including Saudi Hollandi Bank and many others.

Juffali also had a large collection of jewels ordered to pay out to his ex-wife Christina Estrada after a $95 million divorce settlement in 2014, lower than her demand for $8 billion, which was the largest settlement in English legal history.

== Early life and education ==
Juffali was born in Jeddah on 30 April 1955, the son of Ahmed Abdullah Juffali (1924–1994), the founder of E. A. Juffali and Brothers, one of Saudi Arabia's largest companies. This wealthy and secretive family was from Unayzah, Al-Qassim. The Al-Juffali are members of the Bani Khalid dynasty, rulers of Eastern Arabia during the early 1600s to the late 1800s after military defeats against the Saudis. The family are most notable for being direct descendants of Khālid ibn al-Walīd.

His mother was Suad bint Ibrahim Al Husseini, the granddaughter of Kamil of Jerusalem and niece of Hajj Amin of Jerusalem. Juffali had two full-brothers: Khalid bin Ahmed Al Juffali, and Tarek bin Ahmed Al Juffali.

After completing his elementary and secondary education between Jeddah and Switzerland, he continued his university education at the University of San Diego where he was awarded a bachelor's degree in International Business and Political Sciences. After his graduation, he was gradually introduced to multiple public assignments in Jeddah, the western province of Saudi Arabia, where he was responsible for the development of Siemens Arabia and Nabors.

He received a bachelor's degree from the University of San Diego, California in 1977. Juffali was also a graduate of Imperial College, where he received a doctorate in neurosciences in 2012. His PhD thesis was entitled, "A Novel Algorithm for Detection and Prediction of Neural Anomalies".

Juffali developed a great interest in brain theory. He launched multiple initiatives and programs that continue to serve and educate various community sectors and focus on developing and understanding the human brain. Juffali launched the brain forum, where his vision was to create a platform that would contribute to the progression of brain research and encourage global collaboration and initiatives with the potential to transform lives. Juffali successfully held a state-of-the-art conference in 2013, followed by a second in 2015, with over 1,000 participants from 27 countries. Following this, the conference became an annual event. In 2016, the brain forum hosted more than 1,400 participants from 31 different countries. Juffali was also fluent in four languages: Arabic, English, French, and German.

== Career ==
Juffali was the chair of Saudi American Bank and wholly owned his own specialist Neuroscience company, NeuroPro.

In 2005, he was appointed chair of Dow Chemical Arabia. In the same year, he chaired the board of directors for Siemens Arabia and became the board member of Nabors (Oil and Gas).

Juffali had a 5% stake in Hitachi after investing $100m in the project through WJCO (Al-Walid Al Juffali Company) in January 2009. W Investments also had an 11% stake in Manchester United after purchasing the stake in May 2012.

He was the chairman of E. A. Juffali and Brothers, a position he had held since at least 2005.

In 2005, Juffali was also chairman of Saudi American Bank as well as the chair of the Jeddah Chamber of Commerce and Industry.

In December 2005, the Middle East Broadcasting Corporation (MBC) announced that Juffali would host its entrepreneurial reality show, The Investor, which would be shown early in 2006. In her book Arab Television Today, Naomi Sakr compared the show to The Apprentice, but noted that each of the 13 pairs of would-be entrepreneurs had to be from the same family, to reflect the "family aspect of business in the Arab world".

Juffali also had a separate company, W Investments, a private wealth management company. The CEO is Jamil El Imad, also managing director and chief scientist of his NeuroPro company.

== Legal immunity ==
On 9 November 2015, The Daily Telegraph reported that Juffali had gained legal immunity in the UK, having been appointed as St Lucia's "Permanent Representative" to the International Maritime Organization (IMO), which is headquartered in London.

Two days later, St Lucia's Office of the Prime Minister issued a statement confirming that Juffali was appointed to the role in April 2014, "that all necessary due diligence was done prior to the appointment", and it declined the request from his ex-wife's lawyers to "lift the diplomatic immunity of Dr. Juffali to compel Dr. Juffali to testify in the civil suit ... this is a civil matter in which it does not desire to get involved."

On 26 December 2015, The Daily Telegraph reported that it understood that the British Foreign Office had intervened to ask St Lucia to waive Juffali's immunity amid concerns that he was using it to protect his wealth from his ex-wife during divorce proceedings.

On 21 January 2016, The Daily Telegraph reported that the High Court had ordered Philip Hammond, the then British Foreign Secretary, to certify whether the UK had formally accepted Juffali as a diplomat representing St Lucia, as his ex-wife's lawyer stated that Juffali had never attended an IMO meeting. The judge lifted restrictions on reporting his ex-wife's claim that Juffali was seriously ill with cancer in a Swiss hospital since, if he were to die before the case was concluded, her claim would become irrelevant, and she and their daughter would receive no further monthly payments.

In February 2016, the High Court dismissed Juffali's claim of diplomatic immunity as 'spurious'. Juffali appealed the judgment to the Court of Appeal, and was supported by an intervention from the Foreign Secretary. The Court of Appeal overturned the High Court's dismissal of Juffali's immunity, but ruled that his immunity was not relevant to the divorce claim, which it allowed to proceed.

The divorce of Juffali and his second wife, Christina Estrada, was concluded in the British courts in July 2016. Estrada was awarded £75 million, the largest such settlement in English legal history.

== Politics ==
Juffali was one of three Saudi Arabians who donated at least $3 million to the Clinton Presidential Center.

== Personal life ==
Juffali's first wife was fellow Saudi, Basma Al-Sulaiman, who received £40 million in a divorce settlement in 2000. They married in Jeddah, Saudi Arabia, in 1980, where they lived in a marble palace. They had three children, one son and two daughters. (Dina, Hala, and Mohammed). Mohammed died in 2012.

In 2001, Juffali married Christina Estrada, an American former Pirelli Calendar model, but they divorced in 2014. Estrada started divorce proceedings in 2012, after Juffali married Loujain Adada (Saudi law allows up to four wives), and has made a claim against Juffali for at least his three UK properties, which include a seven-bedroom home in Knightsbridge, London, in a converted church, valued in total at about £60 million. Juffali and Estrada have a daughter (Sirina).

Juffali also owned Bishopsgate House in Egham, Surrey, which he acquired from his parents in about 2001. There were "three butlers, six gardeners, five maids, two laundry girls, two drivers, two personal assistants, two nannies and an estate manager on the staff". Juffali's art collection, estimated at £4 million, was auctioned onsite at Bishopsgate House by Bonham's on 26 March 2018.

In November 2012, Juffali married then 25-year-old Lebanese model and TV presenter Loujain Adada in Venice. In 2022, Adada, commonly known as "LJ", starred in the Netflix reality show Dubai Bling. Juffali's estate and death are spoken about on the show.

== Death ==
On 20 July 2016, Juffali died in Zürich, Switzerland, after a lengthy period with cancer. His estate is in the hands of his brother Sheikh Khalid bin Ahmed Al Juffali as the inheritor, as well as the legal guardian of his five daughters.

== Ancestry ==
Ancestors of Walid Juffali

16. Nasser bin Breikan Al Juffali
8. Ibrahim bin Nasser Al Juffali
4. Abdullah bin Ibrahim Al Juffali
2. Ahmed bin Abdullah Al Juffali
10. Ibrahim bin Abdulaziz Al Obeid
5. Madawi bint Ibrahim Al Obeid
1. Al-Walid bin Ahmed Al Juffali
12. Kamil bin Mohammed Al Husseini
6. Ibrahim bin Kamil Al Husseini
3. Suad bint Ibrahim Al Husseini
