= St John's Church, Egham =

Church in Egham, Surrey, England

Coordinates: 51.4323°N 0.5441°W

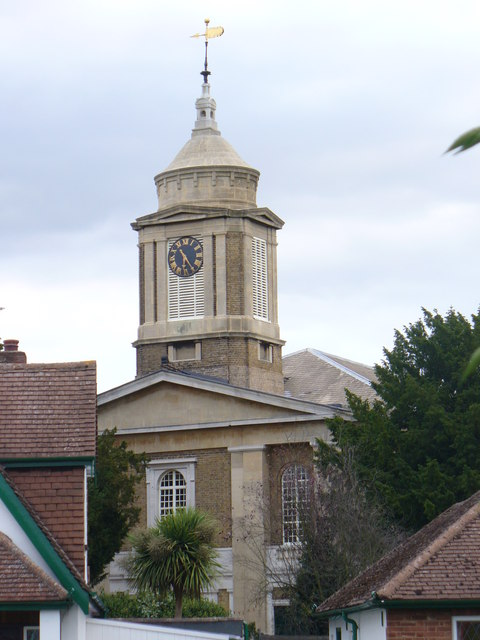
St. John's Church in Egham

St. John's Church, Egham or St. John the Baptist, Egham or St. John's Church is an evangelical Anglican church located in the centre of Egham, Surrey, in the Diocese of Guildford. There are approximately 320 members on the Electoral Roll and a usual Sunday attendance in the region of 300. The church's current vicar is Revd Esther Prior, who was appointed as Vicar in September 2018.

== History ==
The current church, of Georgian architecture, was built between 1817 and 1820 with the first Sunday service in the new church held on March 16, 1820. There has been a church on the site since about 1150 and the lychgate precedes the current building. John Wesley preached in Egham during his English ministry in about 1771. Both the church and the lychgate are Grade II* listed structures.

One of those buried in the churchyard is Frederic Cournet, a former French naval officer and political exile. Cournet fought in the last duel to take place in England, in 1852 at nearby Englefield Green. His opponent was compatriot Emmanuel Barthélemy who fled to England after taking part in the 1848 June Days Uprising. Cournet was wounded and died some hours later. Barthélemy was found guilty of manslaughter and served seven months in prison, however he was hanged in London in 1855 after killing two other men.

The Magna Carta baronial shields have been displayed in the narthex since the 1999 liturgical reordering. Prior to that time, they were displayed on the pillars within the nave.

== Local projects ==
St John's currently runs and supports a number of projects for Egham. They run an English Language Cafe for people for whom English is not their first language, Christians Against Poverty Life Skills course, The Besom which ensures facilitates people to give and receive furniture or household items they need, and many more projects. More information can be found on their website, including information about their global mission partners.

== Recent events ==
On 17 February 2014, Vicar Jeff Wattley and several parishioners were guests on the BBC One programme The One Show, helping those in need from flooding.
