= Albert Houthuesen =

British painter (1903–1979)

- Born: Albertus Antonius Johannes Houthuesen; 3 October 1903; Amsterdam, Netherlands
- Died: 20 October 1979 (aged 76); London, England
- Citizenship: British
- Education: Fleet Road Elementary School; Saint Martin's School of Art; Royal College of Art
- Known for: Painting
- Spouse: Catherine Dean

Albertus Antonius Johannes Houthuesen (Dutch: [ɑlˈbɛrtʏs ˈhʌutˌhysə(n)]; 3 October 1903 – 20 October 1979), known as Albert Houthuesen (English: /ˈhaʊtjuːzən/ HOW-tew-zən), was a Dutch-born British artist.

== Life ==
=== Early life and training ===
Albert Houthuesen was born in the Oude Pijp neighbourhood of Amsterdam, at 263 Albert Cuypstraat, the eldest of the four children of Jean Charles Pierre Houthuesen (1877–1911), a painter and musician, and his wife Elisabeth Petronella Emma, née Wedemeyer (1873–1966). After Jean Charles Pierre's early death, when Albert was 8 years old, the family moved near Elisabeth's mother in London, and Elisabeth opened a boarding house at 20 Constantine Road, near Hampstead Heath.

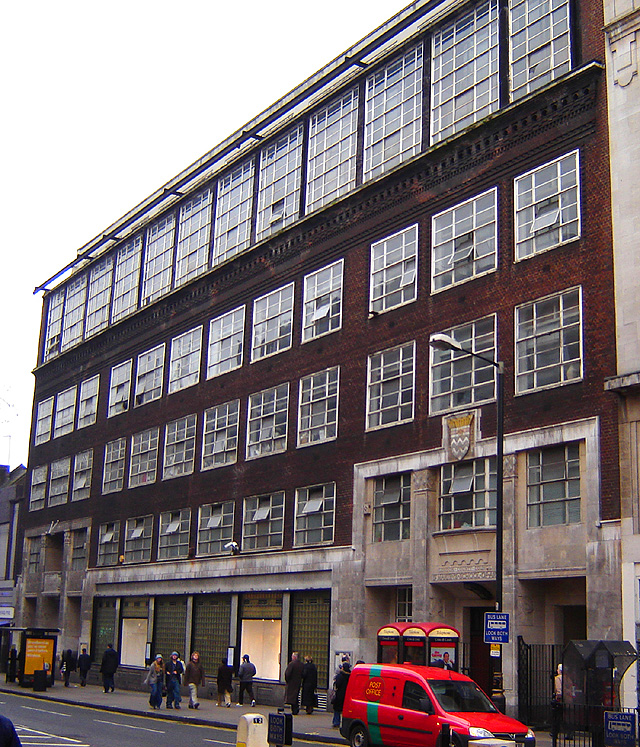
The former Saint Martin's School of Art building, in Charing Cross Road

Houthuesen left school aged 14 and went to work for a grocer, then as a lens fitter, apprentice engraver, tailor's stencil cutter, and furniture restorer. At the same time, he began attending evening classes at Saint Martin's School of Art. He shared a studio with artists Gerald Ososki, Barnett Freedman and Reginald Brill in Howland Street (Fitzrovia). Though he loved watching Charlie Chaplin, he preferred theatre to film, particularly enjoying performances by the comedians George Robey and Little Tich.

In 1921, he made the first of three trips to Holland, spending time with an uncle, the painter and potter Bernard Boeziek. He became a British citizen in 1922. In 1923–1924, he was designing lettering for the architectural sculpture firm Aumonier.

Thanks to William Rothenstein, principal of the Royal College of Art, Houthuesen was eventually able to obtain a scholarship to attend the RCA between 1924 and 1927, with contemporaries Henry Moore, Barbara Hepworth, Edward Burra, Ceri Richards and Cecil Collins. Rothenstein invited Houthuesen to stay when his deeply unhappy home life prevented him from studying effectively. Vivian Pitchforth is reported to have seen particular promise in Houthuesen's student work.

=== Teaching and painting ===
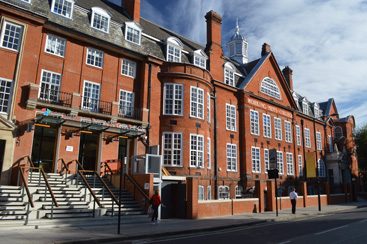
The Working Men's College in Camden

In 1927, at the RCA, Houthuesen also met his future wife Catherine Dean. He stayed on at college as a student demonstrator until the following summer. He then gave evening art classes at the Mary Ward Settlement and the Working Men's College with colleagues Percy Horton and Barnett Freedman, under the directorship of James Laver. He taught at the Working Men's College until 1938. In 1929, he undertook his first commission for Herbrand Russell, 11th Duke of Bedford, making copies of enamel miniature portraits.

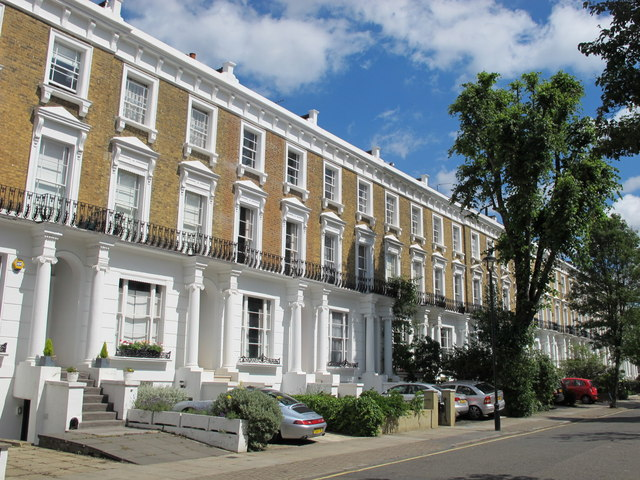
Abbey Gardens, St John's Wood

Albert Houthuesen married Catherine Dean in 1931. They lived in a flat at 20 Abbey Gardens in St John's Wood. Throughout the 1930s they visited Trelogan, near the Point of Ayr colliery in north east Wales, staying in Mersey Cottage, owned by Catherine's aunts. Here Houthuesen painted landscapes and portraits of colliers.

In spring 1936, Houthuesen suffered an internal hemorrhage due to a duodenal ulcer, from which it took him a long time to recover.

When Herbrand Russell's wife, the aviator and ornithologist Mary Russell, Duchess of Bedford, died in a plane crash in March 1937, the duke commissioned a stained-glass memorial window in St Mary's Church, Woburn of Saint Francis of Assisi surrounded by birds.

In 1938, the Houthuesens moved to 37b Greville Road, not far from their previous London home.

=== War work ===
In September 1940 the house of the Houthuesens' immediate neighbour and landlord, sculptor Alfred Frank Hardiman, was bombed in the Blitz. Nobody was hurt, but the house was uninhabitable. The Houthuesens returned to Trelogan.

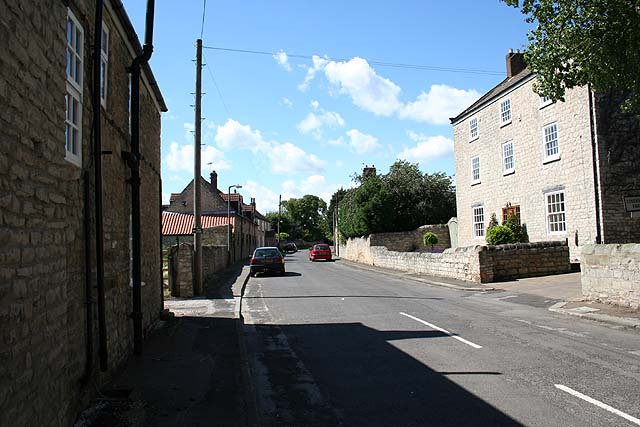
Loversall

From late 1941 until the end of the war, they lived in Yorkshire, just south of Doncaster, where St Gabriel's College, the teacher training college where Catherine worked, was evacuated. They lived first in a cottage in Letwell, then in the Farm House in Loversall, and by summer 1943 at 21 St Mary's Gate in Tickhill. Houthuesen was rejected from the army on health grounds and worked as a draughtsman for the London and North Eastern Railway at the Doncaster Works. He suffered a severe nervous breakdown and was discharged in March 1944.

He made his first clown drawings in 1944, after seeing a family of Russian Jewish clowns, the Hermans, at the Grand Theatre in Doncaster.

=== After the war ===
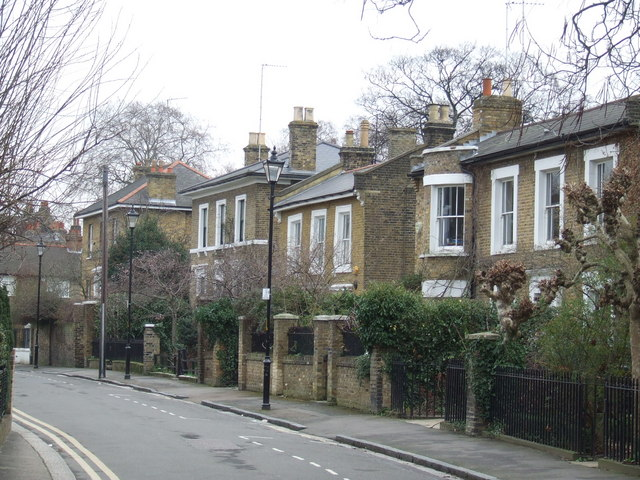
Love Walk, Denmark Hill

The Houthuesens returned to London at the end of the war and lived in Lady Margaret Vicarage in Chatham Street, Southwark, where they acted as wardens for St Gabriel's College students accommodated there. Houthuesen was able to attend ballets at Covent Garden and the Adelphi Theatre, such as Los Caprichos (inspired by the Goya etchings), Petrushka, The Three-Cornered Hat, and Les Sylphides.

In autumn 1950, the Houthuesens moved again, to (then) semi-derelict Stone Hall with overgrown gardens, in Oxted, Surrey, and then again, in July 1952, to their final home at 5 Love Walk, in Denmark Hill, Camberwell.

Houthuesen helped to build up the art collection at St Gabriel's College. His acquisitions included a woodcut of The Ecstasy of Mary Madgalene by Albrecht Dürer, a pencil drawing of Whitehaven on the Cumbrian coast by J. M. W. Turner, a preparatory pencil drawing of three horses' heads for The Frugal Meal by John Frederick Herring Sr., and an aquatint of Christ by Georges Rouault. After the college closed in 1978, the collection was transferred to an educational trust and subsequently loaned to Goldsmiths, University of London.

=== Later life ===
Houthuesen suffered continued ill-health, spending eight weeks in the Gordon Hospital in spring and summer 1961, three weeks in King's College Hospital in early 1965, and suffering a stroke in the 1970s.

In 1976 the BBC broadcast Walk to the Moon: The Story of Albert Houthuesen, a film about Houthuesen's life and work, directed by John Armstrong (1928–2004). The title is a reference to the Dutch expression Loop naar de maan, Houthuesen's mother's response to requests for art supplies.

Albert Houthuesen died on 20 October 1979. A memorial exhibition was held in 1981 at the South London Art Gallery.

== Selected paintings ==
During his career, Houthuesen possibly painted about 2000 works, and although many were acquired by major art galleries and collectors, few have been publicly exhibited. In 2021 Houthuesen's Hedger and Ditcher: Portrait of William Lloyd (1937) was chosen to replace the portrait of slave owner Sir Thomas Picton in the National Museum Cardiff.

- 1927 The Supper at Emmaus (Potteries Museum & Art Gallery, Stoke-on-Trent) View
- 1927 The Traveller (Leeds Art Gallery) View
- 1933 The Collier (William Jones) (Museums Sheffield) View
- 1933 Painted in a Welsh Village, portrait of Harry Jones (Tate) View
- 1933 Grain Barrels (Museums Sheffield) View
- 1934 Jones, White Horse Farm (National Museum Cardiff) View
- 1934 Wheels, Maes Gwyn Farm (Llanasa, near Holywell, Flintshire) (Ulster Museum, Belfast) View
- 1935 Maes Gwyn Stack Yard (Tate) View
- 1935 The Bebington Stable (Leeds Art Gallery) View
- 1935 Jo Parry, Welsh Collier (National Museum Cardiff) View
- 1937 Hedger and Ditcher: Portrait of William Lloyd (National Museum Cardiff) View
- 1939–1940 Crown of Thorns (Tate) View
- 1943 Flying Officer Herbert Houtheusen [sic] (b.1915) (Royal Air Force Museum) View
- c.1944 A Shell and Flowers (Nottingham Castle) View
- 1956–1960 Still Life with Mulberry Leaves (Leeds Art Gallery) View
- 1965 Evening (Yale Center for British Art, New Haven, Connecticut) View
- 1968 Barrier (County Hall, Leicestershire County Council Artworks Collection) View
- 1968 Night Sea, Autumn (Ashmolean Museum) View
- 1970 Ravine (Pallant House Gallery, Chichester) View
- 1972 April Moon, the Gateway (Leeds Art Gallery) View
- 1974 Harlequin (Heritage Doncaster) View
- Undated Implements of the Passion (Campion Hall, Oxford) View
- Undated Still Life of Pears (St Anne's College, Oxford) View

== Reception ==
The art critic Souren Melikian has written: "I suspect that Houthuesen will come to be seen as one of the great figures in post-World War II Western art".

== Published works ==
- Albert Houthuesen and John Rothenstein, Albert Houthuesen: An Appreciation (London, Mercury, 1969), ISBN 0950191906
