= The British Museum Library: A Short History and Survey =

1946 book bu Arundell Esdaile

- First edition
- Author: Arundell Esdaile
- Language: English
- Genre: Non-fiction
- Publisher: George Allen & Unwin
- Publication date: 1946
- Publication place: United Kingdom

The British Museum Library: A Short History and Survey is a book by Arundell Esdaile published by George Allen & Unwin, London, in 1946. It was reprinted in 1979 by Greenwood Press, Westport, Conn. from the 1948 ed. published by G. Allen & Unwin, London, which was issued as no. 9 of the Library Association series of library manuals. Esdaile's book serves as a historical survey of the British Museum Library when the museum and library departments were housed in the same building. The book traces the entire history of the institution, from 1753 to 1945.

== Arundell Esdaile (1880–1956) ==
Esdaile was a graduate of Magdalene College, Cambridge and entered the British Museum in 1903 as an employee of the Department of Printed Books. He served as the Museum's Secretary from 1926 to 1940. While he was not a librarian by education and training, it was at one time the library's policy to hire individuals who had distinguished themselves in the elite universities. Esdaile lectured at University College London from 1919 to 1927.

Esdaile served as editor of: Library Association Record from 1923 to 1935 and Year's Work in Librarianship from 1929 to 1939. He also served as president of the Library Association (UK) from 1939 to 1945.

Publications: Student's Manual of Bibliography (1932), The Sources of English Literature (1928), Bibliography of George Meredith (1907), List of English Tales and Romances Before 1740 (1912), National Libraries of the World (1934), The British Museum Library: A Short History (1946).

== Contents ==
As Esdaile writes,

‘an adequate history and description of the British Museum would require a very large volume. What has been attempted here is something less ambitious. My aim is to provide in a small compass what can only be found scattered through a large number of books and periodicals, a summary account, historical and descriptive, which shall be full enough to be useful for reference and information, and at the same time to bring out the true significance of the collections and the tale of their gathering- in a word, to be readable.’

Esdaile writes only of the Bloomsbury building and not the Kensington Natural History branch. This history is only current up until the publishing date, 1946.

For librarians, this work covers the career of Anthony Panizzi, one of the first librarians to develop a sensible cataloguing system Anthony Panizzi. Esdaile features Panizzi quite prominently in the narrative of the work because of his transformative role in the future of the library. Note: on the publication information page, there is a note which states, ‘Book Publication War Economy Standard: The paper and binding of this book conform to the binding economy standard.’

== Table of contents ==
388 Pages, contains Index and explanatory notes; 8 inches tall. Cover image:‘The design on the cover of this book represents one of the bronze lions, designed for the British Museum by Alfred Stevens, which originally surmounted a low railing in Great Russell Street, and were later placed inside the Museum.’ –Editor's Note on seventh leaf

The contents of Esdaile's book are as follows (chapter name and written chapter focus; all copied verbatim from the text). The purpose of listing here is to provide metadata for future searches, as well as a brief overview for researchers.

Introduction

Sir Frederic G. Kenyon was the director and principal librarian of the British Museum Library in the early 20th century. His introduction explains the accomplishment of writing about the lengthy history of the British Museum Library, something that had not, as of the publication date been done before.

Part I

Chapter 1. The Foundation – the Act of 1753 and the opening – Origins of the Foundation Collections – The Suppression of the Monasteries : Archbishop Parker and the Antiquaries – Robert Cotton, the Harleys and the Old Royal Library – The Royal Society and the Scientists : Arundel – The Movement towards a Public Library The Establishment of the Museum.

Chapter II. Montagu House and the First Fifty Years – Bloomsbury- Montagu House – The Departments and Officers- Publications and Acquisitions- Finances- The Reading Room

Chapter III. New Wine and an Old Bottle: -Changes after 1799 – Increase: Gifts and Purchases – Copyright – Increased Parliamentary Grants – Three great benefactions lost in twelve years – Reorganization – The prints and drawings – Publications – New men, 1824-35 – The Reading Room, 1803-38 – The King's Library and the New buildings, 1815-52.

Chapter IV. Two Public Enquires: Growth and Dissension (1835–50): - The Parliamentary Enquiry, 1835-36 – Changes and Appointments – Watts and the Removal: the Survey and purchase grant acquisitions – The Greenville Library – The Copyright Act of 1842: Collection of copyright books – The manuscripts: acquisitions made, acquisitions missed - The Nitrain Syriac Manuscripts – The printed books: The Catalogue – The Royal Commission, 1847-49 – Action on the Royal Commission Report.

Chapter V. The Reading Room and Iron Library: Panizzi, Principal Librarian (1851–66) – The Reading Room and Iron Library – Panizzi, Principal Librarian.

Chapter VI. Interlude: Winter Jones, Principal Librarian (1866–79): - John Winter Jones, Watts and the Printed Books – The Manuscripts: Bond follows Madden – The Maps and the Oriental Manuscripts.

Chapter VII. Bond, Principal Librarian: Printing the General Catalogue (1879–88) – The General Catalogue – The Subject Index – Buildings: The Sliding Presses: The White Wing – The Manuscripts.

Chapter VIII. Maunde Thompson, Director and Principal Librarian (1888–1911): Staff reorganization – copyright – building – The Oriental Library – The Printed Books and the Reading Rooms : Garnett and others – the Manuscripts: Warner and Others – Maunde Thompson.

Chapter IX. The Last Thirty Years: Sir Frederic Kenyon, Director and Principal Librarian: the Kind Edward VII Building – the Copyright Acts, 1911 and 1915 – The Four-Years’ War – Between two wars

Part II-

The Extent of Part two covers the following collections and their catalogues: The Printed Books The Manuscripts The Oriental Printed Books and Manuscripts (The Near and Middle East : India, with Ceylon, and Burma : Central and Eastern Asia)

Appendices

The Elected Trustees.--The Keepers and Deputy Keepers.--The First Reading Room Regulations.--Alienation, Lending and Removal.--Binding.--Classification of Printed Books.--Photography.--The Natural History Museum Library.--The Staff: a Note.--The Report and Quarterly

== Sources ==
Esdaile, Arundell. The British Museum Library: a Short History and Survey. London: George Allen & Unwin, 1946.

Engelbarts, Rudolf. Librarian Authors: A Bibliography. (Jefferson: McFarland). 1991. pp. 139–140.
