= Trelogan =

Village in Flintshire, Wales

Coordinates: 53.310°N 3.321°W

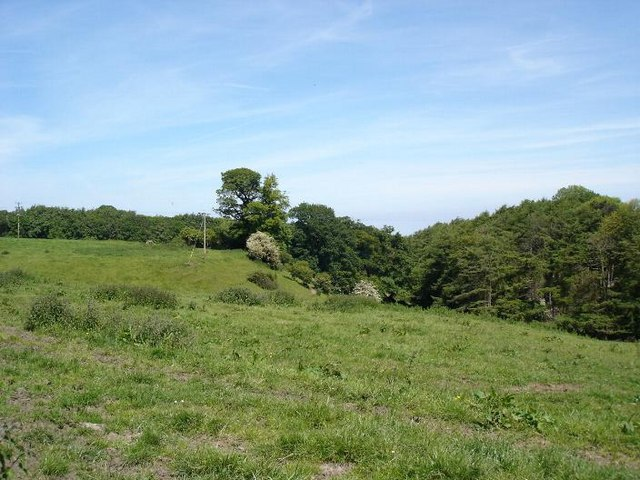
- Trelogan fields

- Location within Flintshire
- Population: 671
- OS grid reference: SJ119801
- Principal area: Flintshire
- Preserved county: Clwyd
- Country: Wales
- Sovereign state: United Kingdom
- Post town: HOLYWELL
- Postcode district: CH8
- Dialling code: 01745
- Police: North Wales
- Fire: North Wales
- Ambulance: Welsh
- UK Parliament: Clwyd East
- Senedd Cymru – Welsh Parliament: Delyn

Trelogan is a village in Flintshire, north east Wales. It is located between Mostyn and Trelawnyd and is almost contiguous with Berthengam. Trelogan had a population of 671 as of the 2011 census.

The village has its own primary school (Ysgol Gynradd Trelogan), community centre, photographers studio, animal rescue centre and, until 2005, its own post office. As of early 2017 North Clwyd Animal Rescue opened their own cafe which is open to the public.

The placename Trelogan derives from the name Logan, the person believed to have founded the village having been named that. The village in history was the locality for several lead-zinc mines, working at least until 1841.

Many people in Japan are familiar with Trelogan, as UK scientists developed a process to plant the semi-toxic, at least to plants, spoil tips from the lead-zinc mines with native UK plant species. Up to this point it had not been possible to grow plants on this type of semi-toxic terrain which was common in Japan due to the many lead-zinc mines in operation.

== Education ==
Trelogan Primary School (Ysgol Gynradd Trelogan) opened in 1908 and educates 52 pupils, aged 5–11, and 8 in nursery classes. The Headteacher is Miss Faye Sullivan.

== Notable people ==
- David Lloyd (singer) was born in Trelogan in 1912.
- The artists Catherine Dean and Albert Houthuesen visited Trelogan throughout the 1930s.
