= Oxford High School, England =

Oxford High School GDST

Location
- Belbroughton Road; Oxford, Oxfordshire, OX2 6XA; England; 51.77333°N 1.25944°W

Information
- Type: Private day school
- Motto: Latin: Ad Lucem (Toward the light)
- Established: 1875
- Local authority: Oxfordshire
- Department for Education URN: 123310 Tables
- Chairman of governors: Katherine Haynes
- Headmistress: Marina Gardiner Legge
- Staff: 120
- Gender: Girls
- Age: 4 to 18
- Enrolment: 952
- Website: oxfordhigh.gdst.net

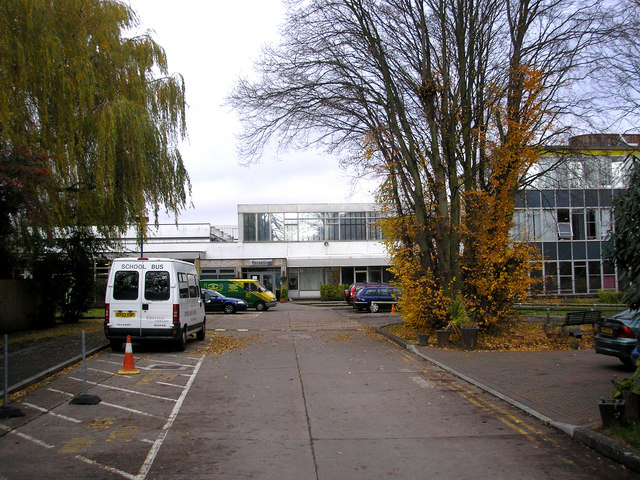
View of the old main entrance at the top of Charlbury Road.

Oxford High School is a private day school for girls in Oxford, England. It was founded by the Girls' Day School Trust (GDST) in 1875, making it the City of Oxford's oldest girls' school.

== History ==
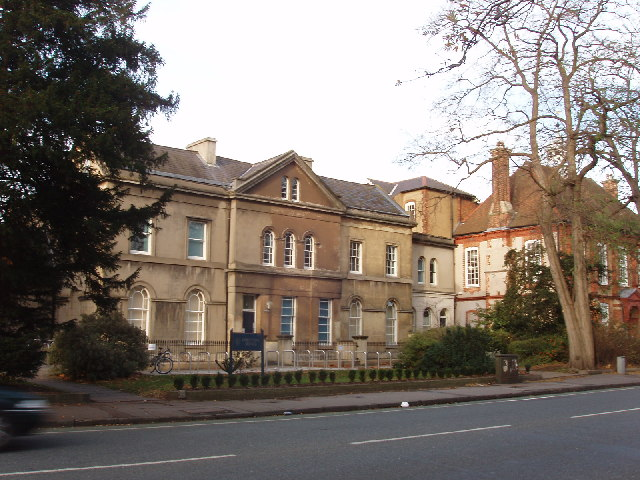
View on Banbury Road with No. 21 on the right, next to the current Oxford University Computing Services.

Oxford High School was opened on 3 November 1875, with twenty-nine girls and three teachers under headmistress Ada Benson, at the Judge's Lodgings (St Giles' House) at 16 St Giles', Oxford. It was the 9th school opened by the Girls' Public Day School Company. Pupils were given a holiday when the Assize Judge visited. The school moved to 38 St Giles' in 1879 and then to 21 Banbury Road at the start of 1881, in a building designed by Thomas Graham Jackson, just south of the location of another Jackson building, the Acland Nursing Home. By this time, the headmistress was Matilda Ellen Bishop.

Rapid expansion led to the ultimate removal of the school to Belbroughton Road in 1957. It became a direct grant grammar school in 1945 under the Education Act 1944 and chose to become independent in 1976 after the scheme was abolished. It absorbed two preparatory schools, Greycotes and The Squirrel, which meant girls could now be educated at Oxford High School from age 3 to Sixth Form.

== Examination results ==
Oxford High School regularly ranks as one of the country's highest achieving independent schools in terms of examination results. The school was ranked first in the South East in a Sunday Times survey based on exam results and "value for money". In the 2011 examinations it was ranked amongst the top 20 independent schools nationwide for GCSE results and the best performing girls' school in the A Levels.

In 2006, the school became the first in Oxfordshire to make Mandarin a compulsory subject. Pupils study it for at least a year, alongside French, and can choose to either continue Mandarin or continue French.

== Facilities and houses ==
As a day school, Oxford High does not have a boarding programme. Pupils in the senior school are divided into four houses, each named after an Ancient Greek deity:

- Zeus (green)
- Ares (blue)
- Athena (yellow)
- Poseidon (red)

== Headteachers ==
As of 2025, the head teacher is Marina Gardiner Legge.

- Marina Gardiner Legge 2019–
- Philip Hills 2017–2019
- Judith Carlisle 2011–2016
- Felicity Lusk 1997–2010
- Joan Townsend 1981–1996
- Elaine Kaye 1972–1981
- Mary Warnock 1966–1972
- M.E. Ann Hancock 1959–1966
- Violet Evelyn Stack 1937–1959
- Rosalind Brown 1902–1932
- Margaret Gale 1932–1936
- Edith Marion Leahy 1898–1902
- Lucy Helen Soulsby 1887–1897
- Matilda Ellen Bishop 1879–1887
- Ada Benson 1875–1879

== Notable alumni ==
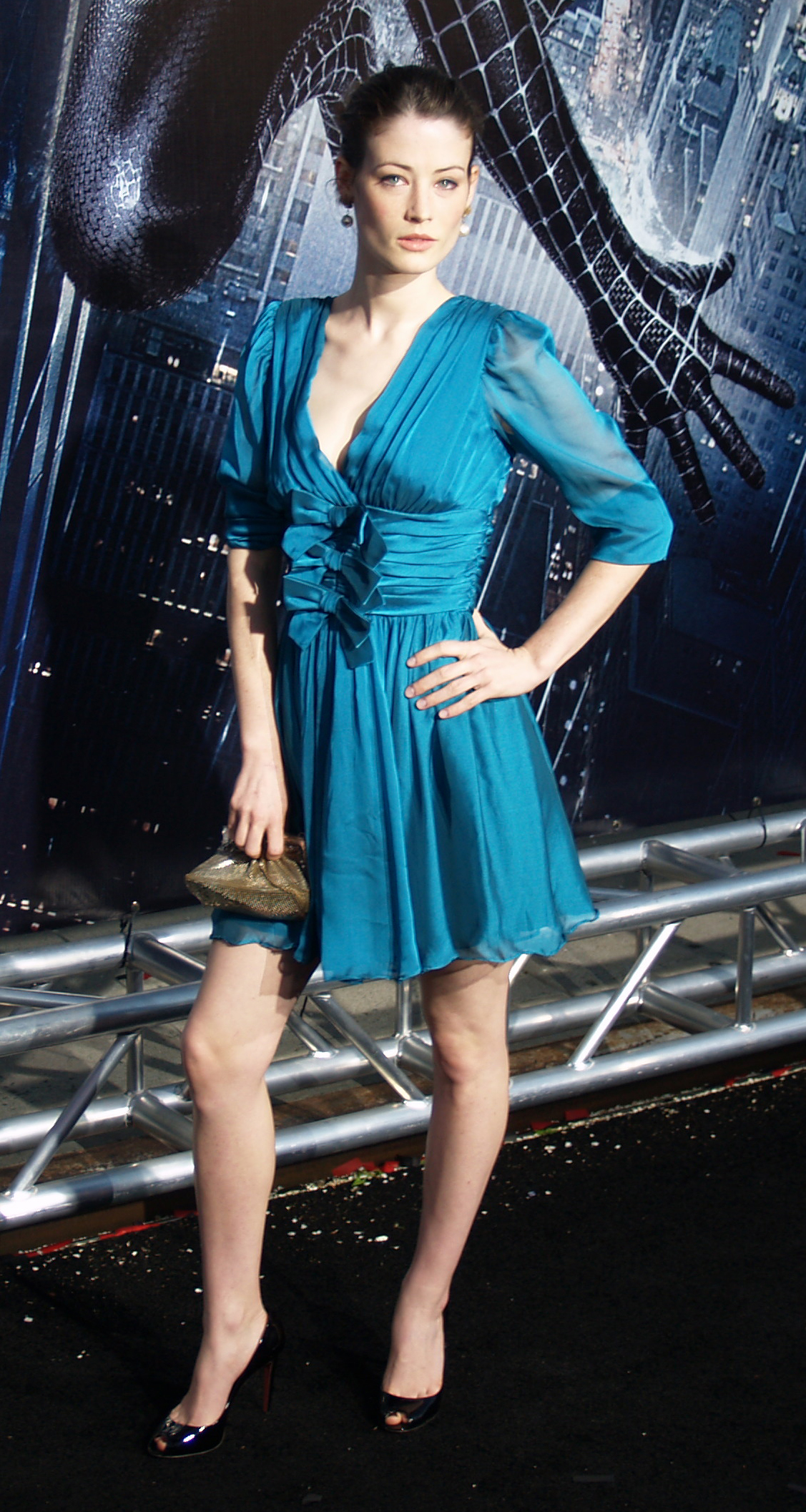
Lucy Gordon

- Josephine Barnes (1912–1999), first woman President British Medical Association
- Ursula Bethell (1874–1945), New Zealand poet and social worker
- Sarah-Jayne Blakemore, Professor of Neuroscience at the University of Cambridge
- Vicky Bowman, née Robinson, former British diplomat
- Emma Bridgewater, potter
- Jacintha Buddicom, poet and childhood friend of George Orwell
- Nancy Cadogan, artist
- Muriel Chapman (1894–1988), chemist
- Catherine Conybeare, academic and philologist
- Charithra Chandran, actress
- Gail Davey, professor of epidemiology
- Cressida Dick (b. 1960), former Commissioner of the Metropolitan Police
- Sian Edwards, conductor
- Sos Eltis, author and academic
- Rebecca Flemming, classicist
- Amelia Fletcher, economist and indie band singer
- Diana Fox Carney, economist, climate policy expert, and wife of Mark Carney
- Martha Lane Fox, entrepreneur lastminute.com
- Mel Giedroyc, actress/comedian
- Lucy Gordon, actress/model
- Emily Gowers, Professor of Latin literature at the University of Cambridge
- Sophie Grigson, cookery TV/writer
- Pippa Harris, film producer
- Ethel Hatch, British painter
- Mary Hockaday, journalist
- Margaret Hodge, Labour MP and minister
- Verena Winifred Holmes, engineer
- Harriet Hunt, chess International Master
- Elizabeth Irving, actress and founder of the Keep Britain Tidy Campaign
- Elizabeth Jennings (1926–2001), poet
- Ludmilla Jordanova, Professor of Modern History at the King's College London
- Frances Kirwan, mathematician
- Susan Lea, Professor at the University of Oxford
- Anna Lapwood, Director of Music at Pembroke College, Cambridge and television/radio presenter
- Rose Macaulay, novelist
- Serena Mackesy, journalist and author
- Miriam Margolyes, (b. 1941), actress
- Ghislaine Maxwell, (junior section, left age 9), socialite and convicted child sex trafficker
- Charlotte Mendelson (b. 1972), novelist
- Kate Ho, (b. 1972), economist
- Anne Mills, health economist
- Kate Montgomery, (b. 1965), artist
- Teresa Morgan, academic
- Eleanor Oldroyd, BBC Radio Sport presenter
- Ann Pasternak Slater, academic
- Eileen Power (1889–1940), economic historian and medievalist
- Rhoda Power (1890–1957), broadcaster and children's writer
- Liz Shore, former deputy chief medical officer
- Ethel Sidgwick (1877–1970), writer and peace activist
- Maggie Smith (1934–2024), double Oscar-winning actress, seven times BAFTA Film Awards winner, Triple Crown of Acting
- Barbara Strachey (1912–1999), broadcaster and writer
- Catherine Tucker, American economist
- Ayesha Vardag, Founder & President of Vardags, divorce lawyer
- Anna Walker, British civil servant
