= David Lloyd (tenor) =

Welsh singer

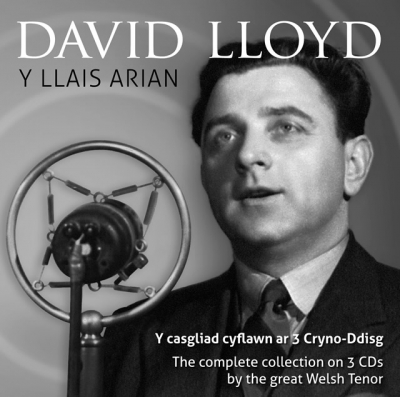

Background information
- Birth name: David George Lloyd
- Born: 6 April 1912; Trelogan, Wales
- Died: 27 March 1969 (aged 56)
- Genres: Opera
- Occupation: Tenor singer

David George Lloyd (6 April 1912 – 27 March 1969) was a Welsh singer. Lloyd, a tenor, was noted for being one of the first Welsh solo singers to seek a broader audience beyond Wales, in the concert halls and recording studios of England, mainland Europe, and North America.

During his lifetime, Lloyd was renowned in opera, oratorio, and in recital, in particular for his performances of Verdi and Mozart. As a Welshman, however, he is remembered most for his renditions of the hymns and folk songs of his native land.

== Early life ==
David Lloyd was born in Trelogan, Flintshire. He was one of seven children, the son of a coal miner. At age 14, he left school to become an apprentice carpenter, but soon began to acquire a reputation as a singer at local eisteddfodau.

== Studies and early successes ==
Lloyd entered the Guildhall School of Music in 1933, having won a scholarship to study singing under Walter Hyde. He won several prestigious prizes at the school, and then in 1938 took on his first notable role, as Macduff in Glyndebourne Festival Opera's production of Verdi's Macbeth. It was the first professional production of the opera in England. He was also the principal tenor at a Mozart festival in Belgium, and a Verdi festival in Denmark in the same year.

== Second World War ==
When the Second World War broke out in 1939, Lloyd's career was put on hold, spending five years serving in the band of the Welsh Guards. He resumed his professional singing in 1946 as the principal tenor at the Verdi and Mozart Festival of the Netherlands, and the Verdi Festival of Britain soon after.

== Injury, and later career ==
In June 1954 he had a serious accident whilst working on a programme for the BBC, which resulted in a fractured spine. Lloyd was not able to perform for the next six years, only making his comeback at the Llangollen International Eisteddfod in July 1960. He died on 27 March 1969.

== Discography ==
- Y Caneuon Cynnar (The Early Recordings), Volume 1: 1940-41 (CD compilation, 1994)
- Y Canwr Mewn Lifrai, Volume 2 (CD compilation, 1995)
- Y Llais Arian, Volume 3 (CD compilation, 2002)
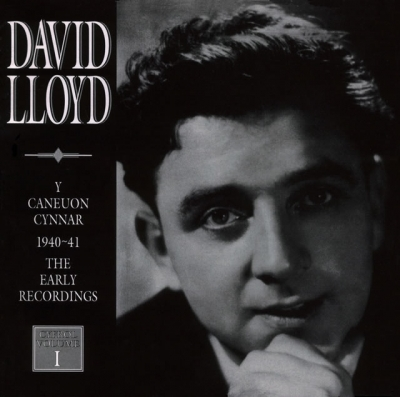

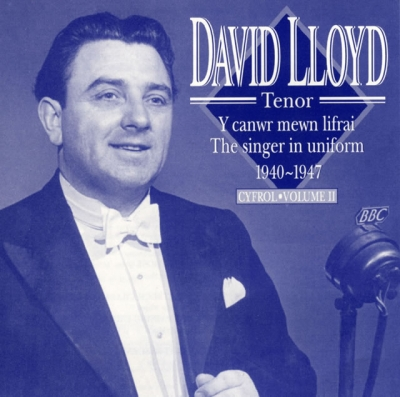

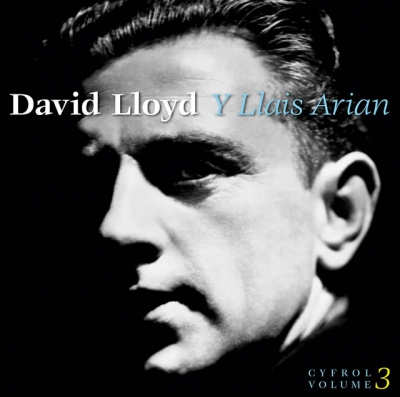
