= David Chapman (chemist) =

English physical chemist

- Born: David Leonard Chapman; 6 December 1869
- Died: 17 January 1958 (aged 88)
- Education: Christ Church, Oxford
- Known for: Chapman–Jouguet condition Gouy-Chapman layer
- Spouse: Muriel Chapman (née Holmes)
- Children: Ruth Chapman
- Awards: Fellow of the Royal Society
- Scientific career
- Fields: Physical chemistry
- Workplaces: Victoria University of Manchester; University of Oxford

David Leonard Chapman FRS (6 December 1869 – 17 January 1958) was an English physical chemist, whose name is associated with the Chapman-Jouguet treatment (on the theory of detonation in gases) and the Gouy-Chapman layer (the surface layer of ions distributed on a charged surface). He was a fellow of Jesus College, Oxford for 37 years, and was in charge there of the last college laboratory at the University of Oxford.

== Education and early life ==
Chapman was born in Wells, Norfolk but moved with his family to Manchester and attended Manchester Grammar School. He then went to Christ Church, Oxford, obtaining degrees in chemistry (1893, 1st class) and physics (1894, 2nd class).

== Personal life ==
Campman was by reputation something of a scientific recluse, difficult to dislodge from his laboratory, although he did play a full part in University and College affairs. Away from his teaching and research, he was reserved and somewhat eccentric, but enjoyed golf, cycling and walking. He married one of his research students, Muriel Holmes (a member of the university's Society of Oxford Home-Students) in 1918 and together they had a daughter, Ruth. He died from cancer at his home in Oxford in 1958.

== Career ==
Chapman was a science master at Giggleswick School for a time before becoming a member of staff at the University of Manchester. In 1907, Jesus College, Oxford appointed him as fellow and tutor in charge of its new teaching and research laboratory. Chapman ran this until his retirement in 1944; the laboratory, the last college-run laboratory in the university, closed in 1947. Chapman was also vice-principal of the college (1926–44).

== Research ==
Although Chapman took a keen interest in his students, research was his main priority. Chapman had a particular interest in the photochemical reaction of hydrogen and chlorine, establishing that minute traces of impurities caused unexpected consequences. He suggested the steady state hypothesis in 1913. He discovered that the interruption of light by a rotating sector caused the rate of the reaction to vary with the frequency of the sector and, in 1926, he was the first to apply this theory to measure the 'mean life' of a reaction intermediate. Other areas of interest were the theory of detonation in gases (the subject of an important paper that Chapman published in 1899, with reliable calculations of detonation speeds; the theory is still known as the Chapman-Jouget treatment) and the distribution of ions at a charged surface (with the name of the Gouy-Chapman layer being given to the surface layer that he envisaged).

== See also ==
- Detonation
- Poisson–Boltzmann equation
