= Church of the Sacred Heart, Camberwell =

Church of the Sacred Heart
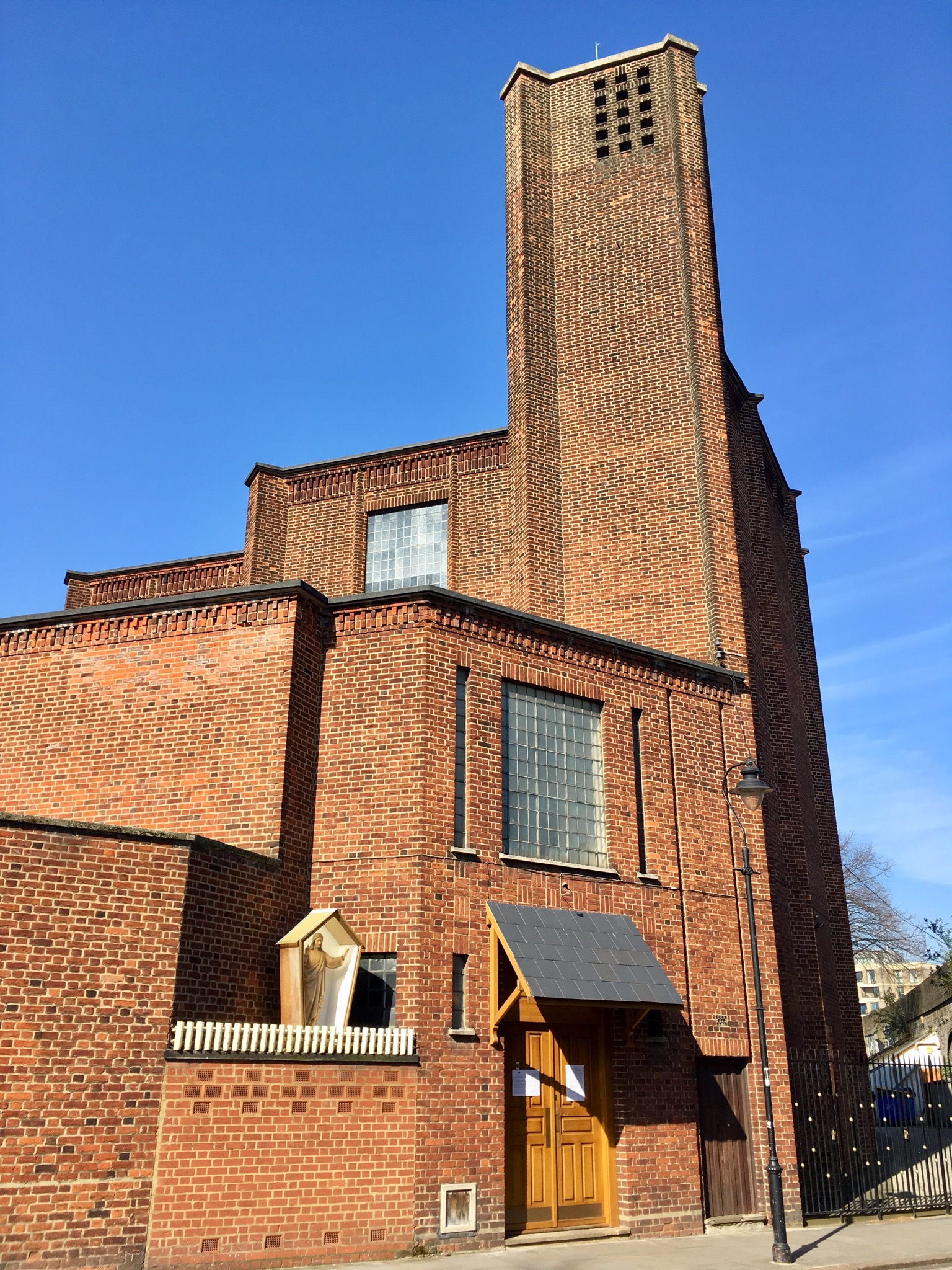
- The church as viewed from Knatchbull Road

- Location within Greater London Location within England
- 51.4748°N 0.0971°W
- OS grid reference: TQ 32253 76809
- Location: Camberwell, London
- Address: Knatchbull Road, SE5
- Country: England
- Denomination: Catholic Church
- Website: www.sacredheartchurchcamberwell.co.uk

History
- Dedication: Sacred Heart

Architecture
- Functional status: Active
- Heritage designation: Grade II
- Designated: 1 April 2015
- Style: Moderne style
- Years built: 1952–1958

Administration
- Province: Ecclesiastical province of Southwark
- Archdiocese: Archdiocese of Southwark
- Deanery: Camberwell
- Parish: Camberwell

Clergy
- Priest: Fr Vincent George CM

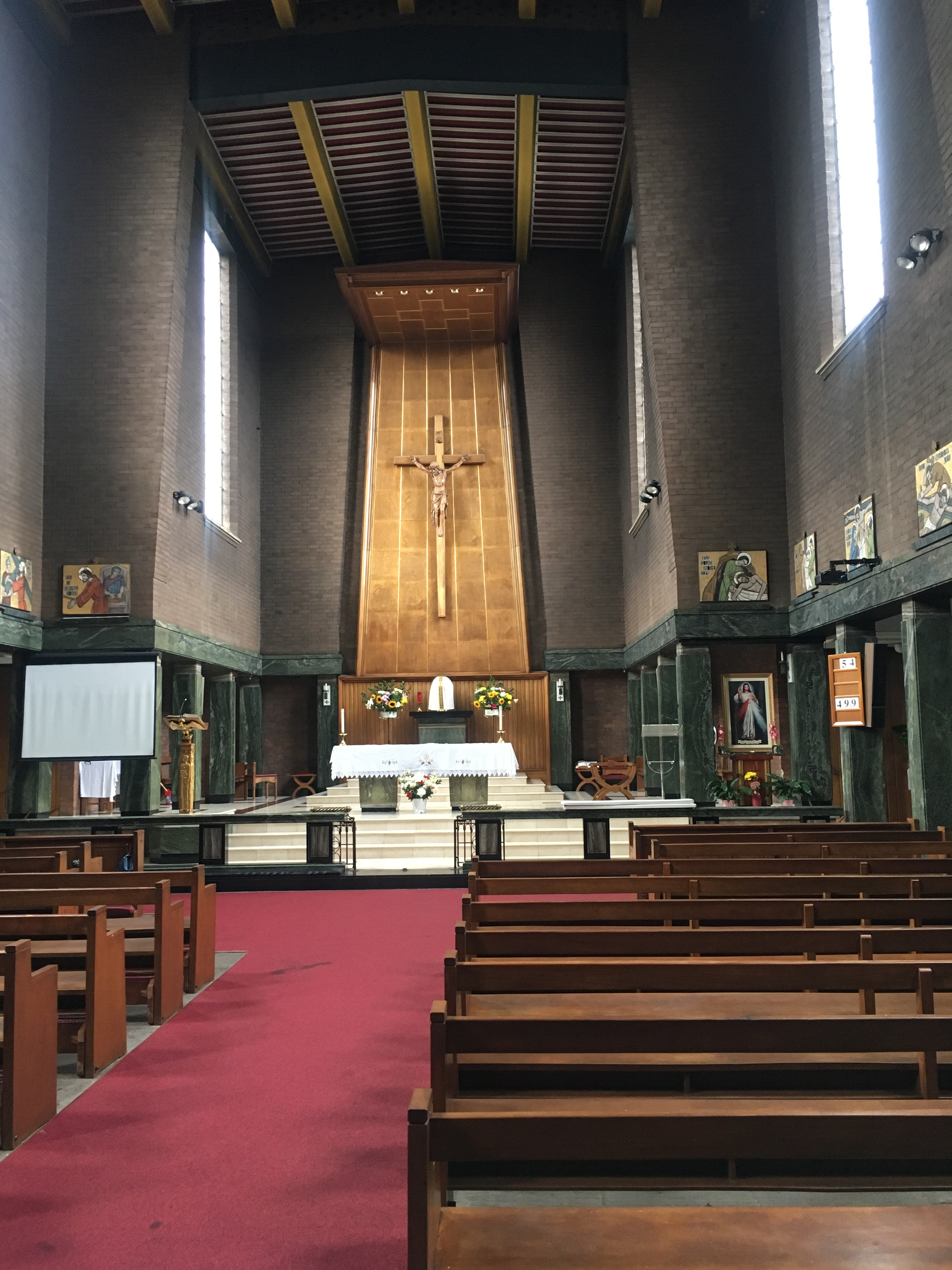
A view toward the altar of the Church of the Sacred Heart in 2017

The Roman Catholic Church of the Sacred Heart is a Roman Catholic church on Knatchbull Road and Camberwell New Road in Camberwell, south-east London, SE5.

The first church on this site was destroyed by enemy action during The Blitz between 8–9 October 1941.

The church was built between 1952 and 1958 in the Moderne style and has been listed Grade II on the National Heritage List for England since 2015. The foundation stone of the present church had been laid by Cyril Cowderoy on 19 April 1952.

The devotional Stations of the Cross sculptures of Sacred Heart were supplied by Burns & Oates, and are placed above the side aisles of the church. The individual Stations of the Cross are made using the opus sectile technique, inlaid on a gold mosaic background.
