= Lucy Soulsby =

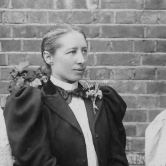
- in 1896
- Born: 18 July 1856; London
- Died: 19 May 1927 (aged 70); Reading
- Employer: Oxford High School for Girls
- Known for: headmistress and anti-suffragist

Lucy Helen Muriel Soulsby (18 July 1856 – 19 May 1927) was a British headmistress of Oxford High School for Girls. She notably opposed women's suffrage.

== Life ==
Soulsby was born in London in 1856. Her parents were Susan Sybilla (born Thompson) and Christopher Percy Soulsby and she spent her early childhood in New Zealand. She and her mother, who ran a school, returned to England in 1867 after her father died. She was very close to her mother who provided her education. When they were living together in Salcombe in Devon their whole day was devoted to household chores, serving tea for visitors and good works in the parish. On Sundays she ran the Sunday School and both of them wrote for magazines. Lucy described her day to a magazine who were intrigued but her mother would not allow it to be published. In 1876 she passed Cambridge University's external examinations (for women).

When her mother died in 1904, Soulsby published an extract of her papers as Home is Best in the same year. Her papers included daily letters sent between them when they were not living together.

In 1885, Dorothea Beale took an interest in Soulsby's career and she began to work at Beale's Cheltenham Ladies College which Soulsby acknowledged was excellent training for her career. She became the headmistress of Oxford High School for Girls in 1887 taking over from Matilda Ellen Bishop In her first year she employed Charles Dodgson as a mathematics tutor. He proved a demanding teacher, but he later donated several first editions of his (Lewis Carroll's) Alice's Adventures in Wonderland. She introduced chemistry as a subject with the warning that it should not overshadow needlework.

Soulsby was a friend of Elizabeth Wordsworth and she was on the council of Wordsworth's Lady Margaret Hall but she came to think that women should not aspire to academic subjects and she was a lone voice in opposing the idea that women in Oxford should be given degrees. Every other Girls' Public Day School Company headmistress was in support of the idea.

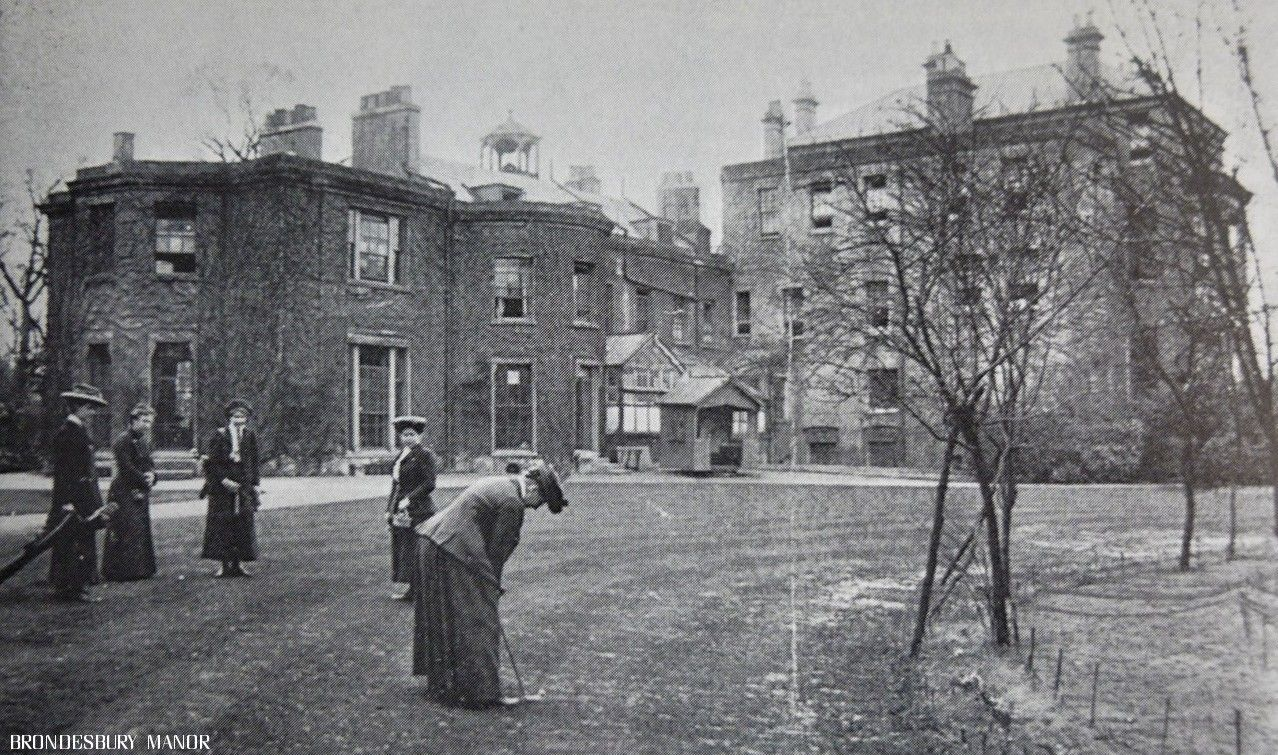
Brondesbury Manor House in 1910 when Soulsby was head

From 1897 to 1915 she led a small school for up to 40 girls at the Manor House, Brondesbury. She supported the Women's National Anti-Suffrage League and believed that women should not have the vote. She valued each pupil and trained each so that they could be as good a wife and mother as her mother had been. By 1915 when she retired these ambitions were no longer inspirational for students. She said that when she needed advice she turned to men. Her 1914 revised version of Principles of Education emphasised bible-reading, prayer and self-discipline.

Soulsby died, unmarried, in Reading in 1927.
