= Nancy Cadogan =

British painter

Nancy Cadogan (born 1979) is a British figurative painter. Her work ranges from still life to landscape and portrait.

She has had solo exhibitions internationally, including at Saatchi Gallery, London in 2019 and Keats-Shelley House, Rome in 2020. Based on footfall (3,329 per day), Nancy Cadogan's solo show Mind Zero at the Saatchi Gallery was one of the top 100 exhibitions in the world in 2019.

In 2022, she was invited as Artist in Residence at the British Ambassador’s Residence in Paris. Her latest project, ‘The Lost Trees’, explores our relationship with trees, time, and the natural world.

In 2024, she was invited by the Torre delle Arti, Bellagio, to showcase a body of work inspired by Lake Como, titled 'Stanza'. Director of the Ingram Collection, Jo Baring has described these works as "a poetic dialogue with the viewer, inviting us into a space of contemplation through the eloquence of her painterly prose.”

== Life and career ==
Cadogan's childhood included stints in Crete and Cyprus with her father. Her family later moved back to UK. Cadogan attended Oxford High School followed by City and Guilds of London Art School before graduating from Canterbury Christ Church University with a degree in Fine Art Painting in 2002. She moved to New York shortly after, sharing a studio in the Starrett-Lehigh Building with artist Franco Ciarlo.

She had sell-out solo shows at Frost & Reed, New York in 2005 and 2006, the former featuring “a series of dramatic paintings depicting the vast Utah landscapes.” In 2008 Cadogan returned to the UK and followed her early success with another solo show at Sladmore Contemporary, London. With breaks for motherhood, she continues to paint from her studio in Northamptonshire and most recently featured in shows with Art Bastion. Miami, in Miami and Southampton, US and The Blue Edition in London. She was named one of 'Top 20 New British Art Talents' by Tatler magazine in 2008, describing her as "the new Paula Rego".

In 2017, she was one of 93 women artists chosen to exhibit their work in The Ned, London, in its permanent Vault 100 exhibition highlighting the disparity between women and men CEOs.

== Artistic style ==
Much of her earlier work focused on portrait and landscapes, and "demonstrate[s] a skillful and purposeful use of colour, balanced with planes and spaces that draw your eye out into large vistas."

In more recent work, which can be seen on Artsy and Art Sales Index, Nancy turns to the concepts of stillness and place, both in the sense of a still life and the various emotional connotations held semantically. Her works are deceptively simple but require deep reading. She has stated, "I am interested in stillness, not only in the sense of a still life and how that tradition explores the passing of time, but actual physical stillness." Critics have also noted her strong use of colour, particularly blues.

Cadogan's subject matter has included Morocco, Utah and Lake Como. In recent work Cadogan has focused on still lives, the imagination of lone women, and trees in 'The Lost Trees'. In one sense, the works are typical of the still life genre and record a sense of time passing. In another, they reflect on the concept of stillness more widely, as a rare condition within our hyper-networked contemporary reality, and instead celebrate quiet reflection. As Cadogan has stated, ‘The book – the actual physical paper bound object full of words – is a treasure in this modern era. A book contains an entire universe you can only bring to life in your imagination, if you agree to give it time. It is a tribute to privacy, an honouring of the interior life.'

In recent works, Cadogan has chosen to focus on large-scale pieces reflecting the beauty of the everyday and the inner life of the mind. Saatchi Gallery Director Philippa Adams stated, “Nancy’s works delightfully capture the sensation of being lost in one’s own thoughts. Their joyful exuberance brings a moment of reflection and calm in today’s uncertain world.”

== Selected exhibitions ==
- 2002 Graduation Show, Mall Galleries, London
- 2003 Gallery 47, London
- 2005 Recent Paintings: Utah Landscapes. Frost and Reed Gallery, NYC
- 2004 Recent Paintings: Morocco. Frost and Reed Gallery, NYC
- 2005 Solo Show, Sextant Inc., NYC
- 2006 Grand Beginnings. GrandyArt, Arndean Gallery, London
- 2007 Group Show, GrandyArt, Smithfield Gallery, London
- 2008 Recent Paintings. Sladmore Contemporary, London
- 2011 Art for Charity Auction, Christie’s, Milan
- 2011 21st Chelsea Antiquarian Book Fair, London
- 2016 A Sense of Place. Art Bastion, Miami
- 2016 Art Southampton 2016, Miami
- 2016 The Blue Edition, 68 Kinnerton Street, London
- 2017 Still Reading, Shapero Modern/Sladmore Contemporary, London
- 2019 Mind Zero, Saatchi Gallery, London
- 2020 Wall of Small, Lyndsey Ingram Gallery, London
- 2020 Art from the Heart - NHS, Zuleika Gallery, London
- 2020 What we See, Gillian Jason Gallery, London
- 2020-2021 Gusto, Keats-Shelley House, Rome
- 2021 All The Good Things, The Cadogan, A Belmond Hotel, London
- 2022 Eye of the Collector, London
- 2022 The Still Point, Gillian Jason Gallery, London
- 2023 LAPADA, Gillian Jason Gallery, London
- 2023 The Beaumont London Commission, Atelier Zuleika, London
- 2023 British Art: Then and Now, Dorfold Zuleika Gallery, London
- 2023 Royal Academy Summer Exhibition, Royal Academy, London
- 2024 LOVE /lʌv/, Loughran Gallery, London
- 2024 Stanza, Torre delle Arti, Bellagio
- 2025 'The Lost Trees' at the Garden Museum, London

== Family ==
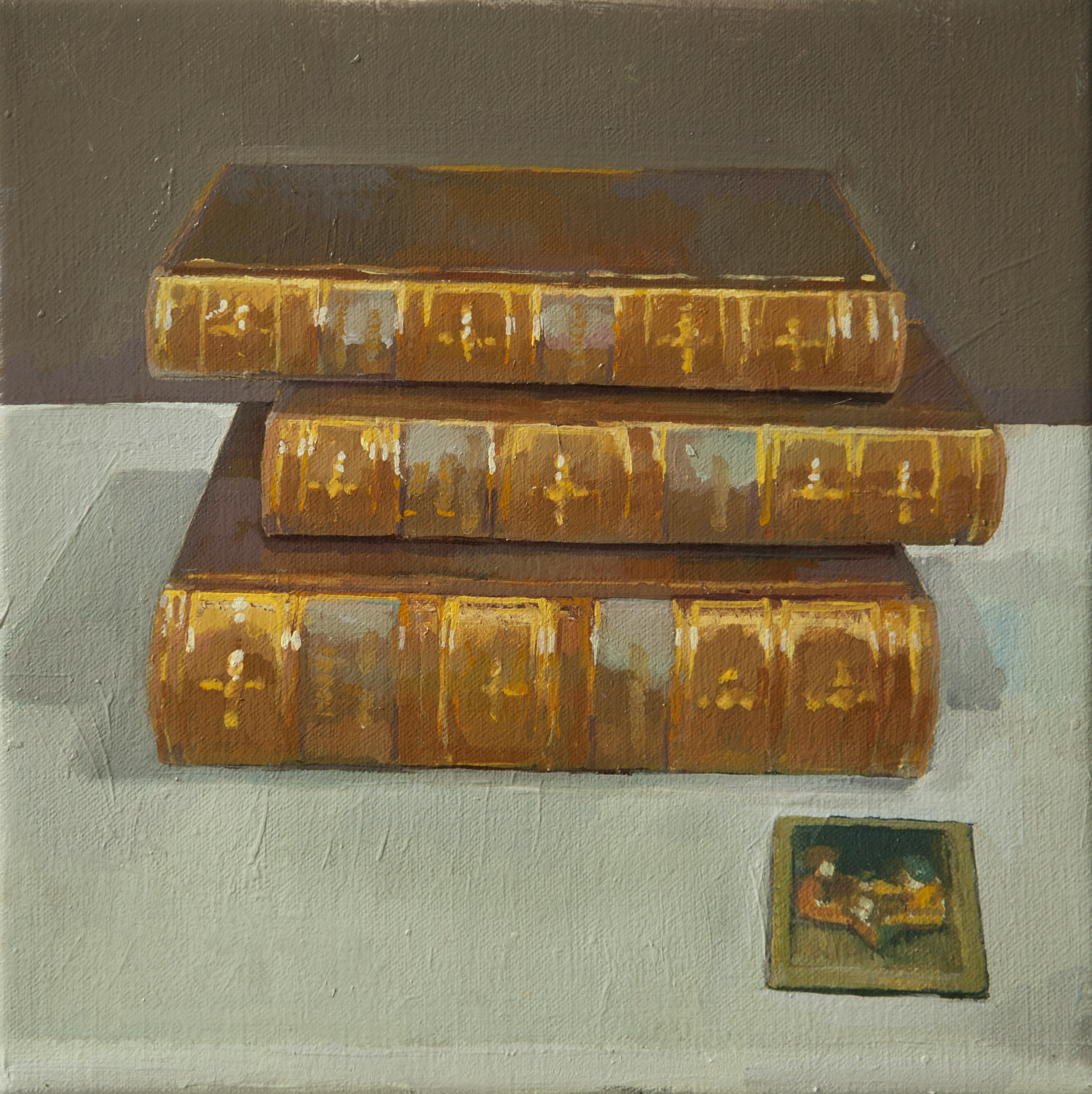
Dickens And The Card Players, 2008, Nancy Cadogan

Cadogan is the daughter of the archaeologist Gerald Cadogan, known for his work on the Myrtos Pyrgos Minoan site on Crete and the Maroni Vournes site on Cyprus.

Cadogan married Edward Benjamin Newton Guinness of the Guinness family in Como in 2006 and has legally taken his surname. They have three children and live in Northamptonshire.
