= Katharine Esdaile =

British art historian (1881–1950)

- Born: Katharine Ada McDowall; 23 April 1881; London, England
- Died: 31 August 1950 (aged 69); Queen Victoria Hospital, East Grinstead
- Education: Notting Hill High School; Lady Margaret Hall, Oxford
- Occupation: art historian
- Spouse: Arundell James Kennedy Esdaile
- Children: 3
- Parent(s): Andrew McDowall; Ada Benson
- Relatives: Edward White Benson (uncle)

Katharine Ada Esdaile (née McDowall, 23 April 1881 – 31 August 1950) was a British art historian, particularly of English post-medieval sculpture, "the subject she made peculiarly her own".

== Early life ==
She was born Katharine Ada McDowall on 23 April 1881, in London, the daughter of Andrew McDowall, secretary to the Girls' Public Day School Trust, and his wife, Ada Benson, sister to Edward White Benson, the Archbishop of Canterbury, and the first headmistress of each of Norwich, Oxford, and Bedford High Schools.

She was educated at Notting Hill High School, followed by a scholarship to Lady Margaret Hall, Oxford, where she earned a degree in Classics in 1903.

== Career ==
Esdaile was early on interested in the sculpture of ancient times, and from 1904 onwards her articles regularly appeared in periodicals including the Journal of Hellenic Studies and the Numismatic Chronicle on the subjects of Greek and Roman coins and on classical portrait sculpture.

In the First World War, she worked for the publishers Batsford, on their British architecture books, and after the war, her interest shifted to English post-medieval sculpture, "the subject she made peculiarly her own". She was often interested in funerary monuments in English churches, and photographed and wrote about them, such as in her 1946 book English Church Monuments 1510-1840.

Esdaile rehabilitated the reputation of the sculptor Roubiliac with two books, Roubiliac's Work at Trinity College, Cambridge in 1924, and her 1928 monograph The Life and Works of Louis François Roubiliac.

== Personal life ==
In 1907, she married Arundell James Kennedy Esdaile (died 1956), secretary of the British Museum from 1926 to 1940, and they had a daughter followed by two sons.

== Legacy ==
The Katharine Esdaile Papers are held at the Huntington Library, in San Marino, California, US.
