= Camberwell =

Area of South East London

Coordinates: 51.4736°N 0.0912°W

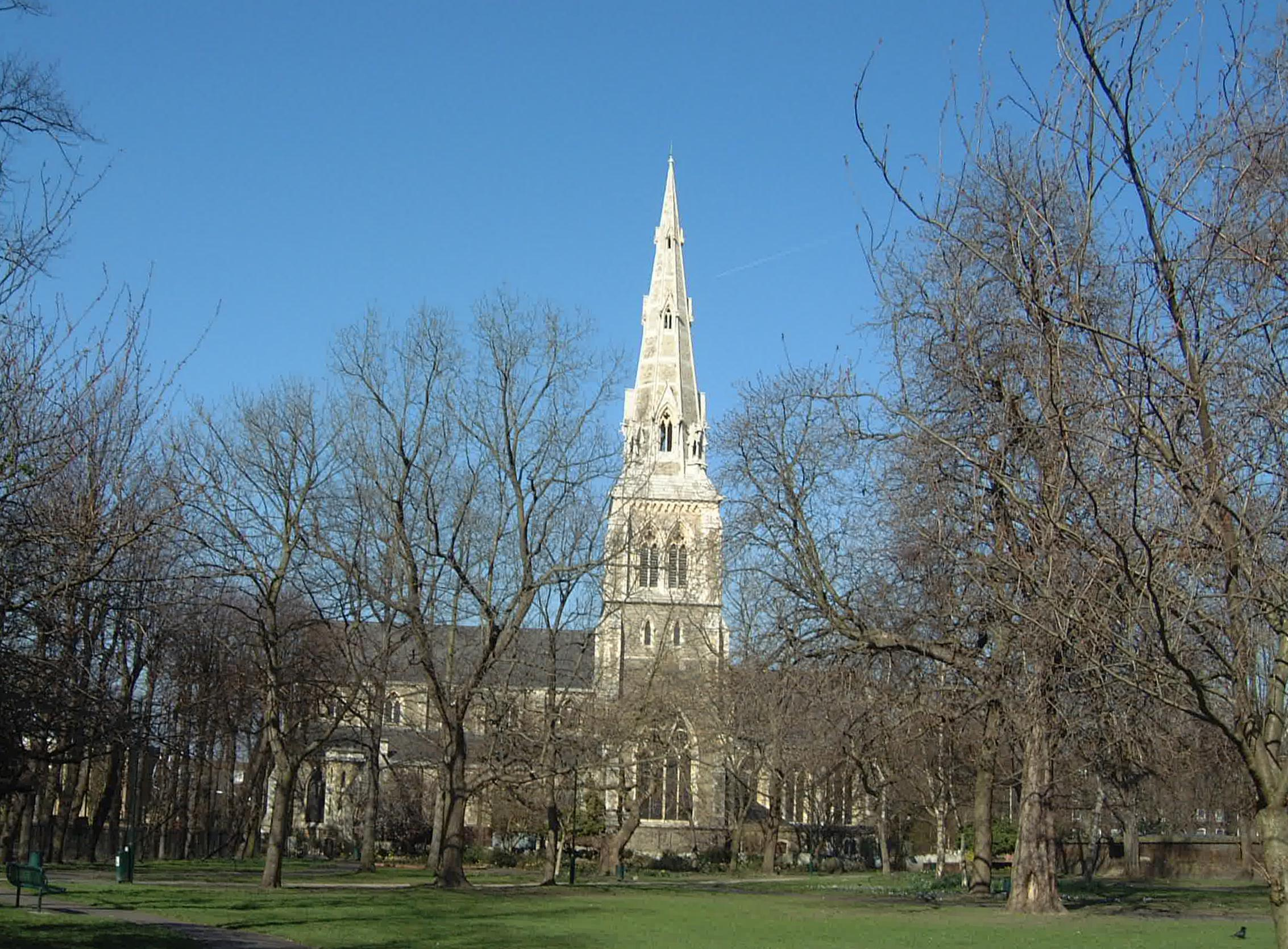
- St Giles' Church, Camberwell

- Location within Greater London
- OS grid reference: TQ325767
  - Charing Cross: 2.7 mi (4.3 km) NW
- London borough: Southwark
- Ceremonial county: Greater London
- Region: London
- Country: England
- Sovereign state: United Kingdom
- Post town: LONDON
- Postcode district: SE5
- Dialling code: 020
- Police: Metropolitan
- Fire: London
- Ambulance: London
- UK Parliament: Peckham; Dulwich and West Norwood; Vauxhall and Camberwell Green
- London Assembly: Lambeth and Southwark

Camberwell (/ˈkæmbərwɛl/ KAM-bər-wel) is an area of South London, England, in the London Borough of Southwark, 2.75 miles (4.5 kilometres) southeast of Charing Cross.

Camberwell was first a village associated with the church of St Giles and a common of which Goose Green is a remnant. This early parish included the neighbouring hamlets of Peckham, Dulwich, Nunhead, and part of Herne Hill (the rest of Herne Hill was in the parish of Lambeth). Until 1889, it was part of the county of Surrey. In 1900 the original parish became the Metropolitan Borough of Camberwell.

In 1965, most of the Borough of Camberwell was merged into the London Borough of Southwark. To the west, part of both West Dulwich and Herne Hill come under the London Borough of Lambeth.

The place now known as Camberwell covers a much smaller area than the ancient parish, and it is bound on the north by Walworth; on the south by East Dulwich and Herne Hill; to the west by Kennington; and on the east by Peckham.

== History ==
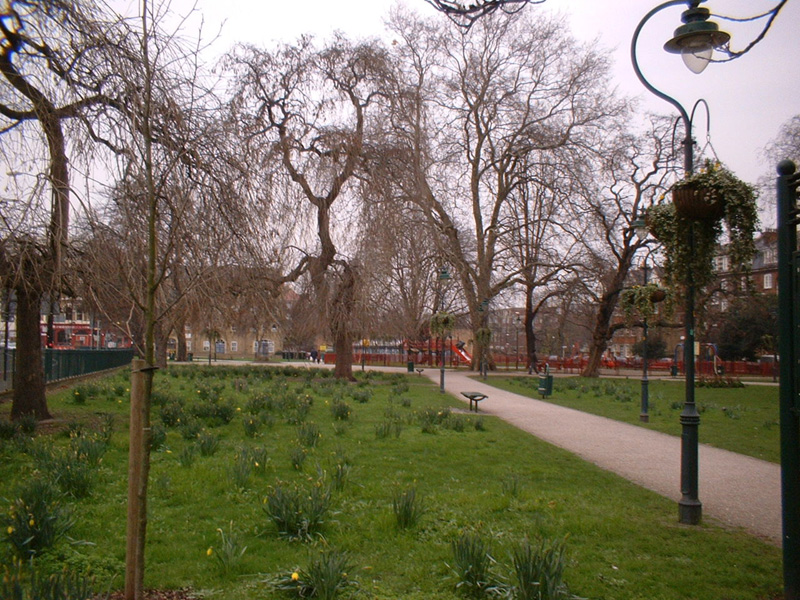
Camberwell Green

Camberwell was a settlement with a parish church when mentioned in the Domesday Book. It was held by Haimo the Sheriff (of Kent). Its Domesday assets were: six hides and one virgate. Up to the mid-19th century, Camberwell was visited by Londoners for its rural tranquillity and the reputed healing properties of its mineral springs. Camberwell was changed by the arrival of the railways in the 1860s. Camberwell Green is now a small area of common land but was once a traditional village green on which was held an annual fair.

There is evidence of a black community residing in Camberwell, made up mostly of African and North American slaves, during the 18th and 19th centuries.

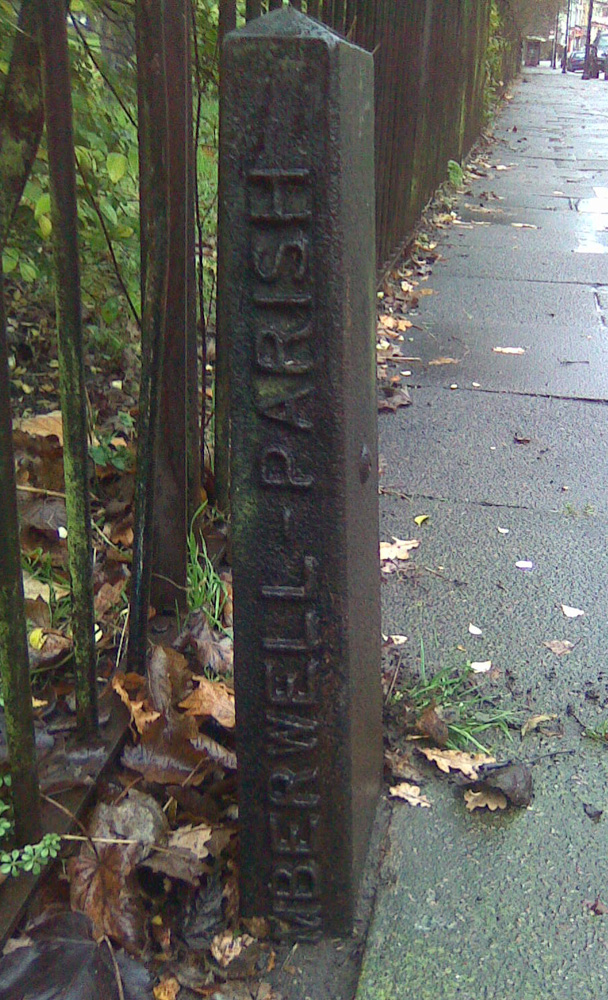
Boundary marker for Camberwell Parish on the route of the Effra at Gipsy Hill. This is not the boundary of what is now known as Camberwell

=== Local government ===
==== The parish of Camberwell ====
Camberwell St Giles is the name given to an ancient, and later civil, parish in the Brixton hundred of Surrey. The parish covered 4,570 acres (1,850 hectares) in 1831 and was divided into the liberty of Peckham to the east and the hamlet of Dulwich to the southwest, as well as Camberwell proper. The parish tapered in the south to form a point in what is now known as the Crystal Palace area. In 1801, the population was 7,059 and by 1851 this had risen to 54,667. In 1829, it was included in the Metropolitan Police District and in 1855 it was included in the area of responsibility of the Metropolitan Board of Works, with Camberwell Vestry nominating one member to the board. In 1889 the board was replaced by the London County Council and Camberwell was removed administratively from Surrey to form part of the County of London.

A map showing the wards of Metropolitan Borough of Camberwell as they appeared in 1916, This includes Dulwich, Peckham, etc.

==== The Metropolitan Borough of Camberwell ====
In 1900, the area of the Camberwell parish became the Metropolitan Borough of Camberwell. In 1965, the metropolitan borough was abolished and its former area became the southern part of the London Borough of Southwark in Greater London. The western part of the area is situated in the adjacent London Borough of Lambeth.

=== Industrial history ===
The area has historically been home to many factories, including R. White's Lemonade, which originated in Camberwell, as well as Dualit toasters. Neither of these companies is now based in the area.

=== Former schools ===
Wilson's School was founded in 1615 in Camberwell by royal charter by Edward Wilson, vicar of the Parish of Camberwell. The charter was granted by James I. The school moved to its current site in Croydon in 1975. A school for girls, Mary Datchelor Girls' School, was established in Camberwell in 1877. It was built on two houses at 15 and 17 Grove Lane, the location of a former manor house. All except one of its 30 pupils came from the parish of St Andrew Undershaft in the City of London. The funding for the school came from a bequest from Mary Datchelor, who died childless. Proceeds of a property in Threadneedle Street used as a coffee-house were used to pay for apprenticeships for the poor boys of the parish, but as demographics in the City changed, it was decided to set up a school. By the 1970s, the school was receiving funding from the Clothworkers' Company and the Inner London Education Authority funded teaching posts. The school came under pressure from ILEA to become co-educational and comprehensive. Faced with this choice or becoming fully private, the school's governors instead decided to close in 1981. The school buildings were later used as offices for the charity Save the Children but have now been converted to flats.

Camberwell Collegiate School was an independent school located on the eastern side of Camberwell Grove, directly opposite the Grove Chapel. The Collegiate College had some success for a while, and led to the closure for some decades of the Denmark Hill Grammar School. However it had difficulty competing with other nearby schools including Dulwich College, and was closed in 1867.The land was sold for building.

== Important buildings ==
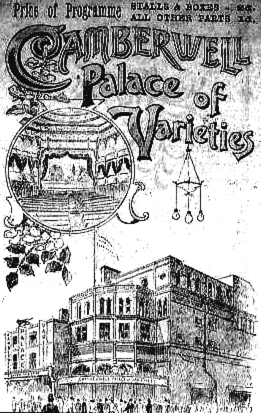
A c. 1900 poster for the Camberwell Palace

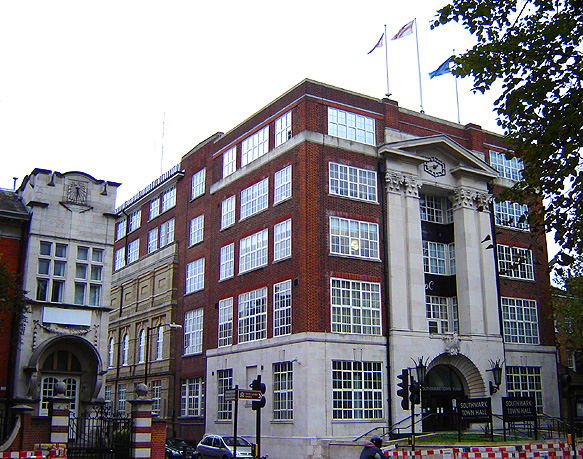
Camberwell Town Hall

Camberwell contains a mixture of Georgian and 20th-century housing, including several tower blocks. Areas such as Camberwell Grove, Grove Lane and Addington Square Feature well-preserved examples of Georgian residential architecture.

The Salvation Army's William Booth Memorial Training College, designed by Giles Gilbert Scott, was completed in 1932: it towers over South London from Denmark Hill. It has a similar monumental impressiveness to Gilbert Scott's other local buildings, Battersea Power Station and the Tate Modern, although its simplicity is partly the result of repeated budget cuts during its construction: much more detail, including carved Gothic stonework surrounding the windows, was originally planned. Camberwell is home to one of London's largest teaching hospitals, King's College Hospital with associated medical school the Guy's King's and St Thomas' (GKT) School of Medicine. The Maudsley Hospital, an internationally significant psychiatric hospital, is located in Camberwell along with the Institute of Psychiatry.

Early music halls in Camberwell were in the back hall of public houses. One, the "Father Redcap" (1853) still stands by Camberwell Green, but internally, much altered. In 1896, the Dan Leno company opened the "Oriental Palace of Varieties", on Denmark Hill. This successful venture was soon replaced with a new theatre, designed by Ernest A.E. Woodrow and with a capacity of 1,553, in 1899, named the "Camberwell Palace". This was further expanded by architect Lewen Sharp in 1908. By 1912, the theatre was showing films as a part of the variety programme and became an ABC cinema in September 1932 – known simply as "The Palace Cinema". It reopened as a variety theatre in 1943, but closed on 28 April 1956 and was demolished.

Nearby, marked by Orpheus Street, was the "Metropole Theatre and Opera House", presenting transfers of West End shows. This was demolished to build an Odeon cinema in 1939. The cinema seated 2,470, and has since been demolished. A second ABC cinema, known originally as the Regal Cinema and later as the ABC Camberwell, opened in 1940. With only one screen but 2,470 seats, the cinema was one of the largest suburban cinemas in London and continued to operate until 1973, after which it was used as a bingo hall until February 2010. The building retains its Art Deco style and is Grade II listed.

The Church of the Sacred Heart, Camberwell has been listed Grade II on the National Heritage List for England since 2015. Camberwell Town Hall, designed by Culpin and Bowers, was completed in 1934.

The former St Gabriel's College and the neighbouring Charles Edward Brooke School in Cormont Road, constructed at the end of the 19th century, are both Grade II listed buildings. The Charles Edward Brooke School building was included on the Victorian Society's Top Ten Endangered Buildings list in May 2024.

On 3 July 2009 a major fire swept through Lakanal House, a twelve-storey tower block. Six people were killed and at least 20 people were injured.

== Camberwell beauty ==
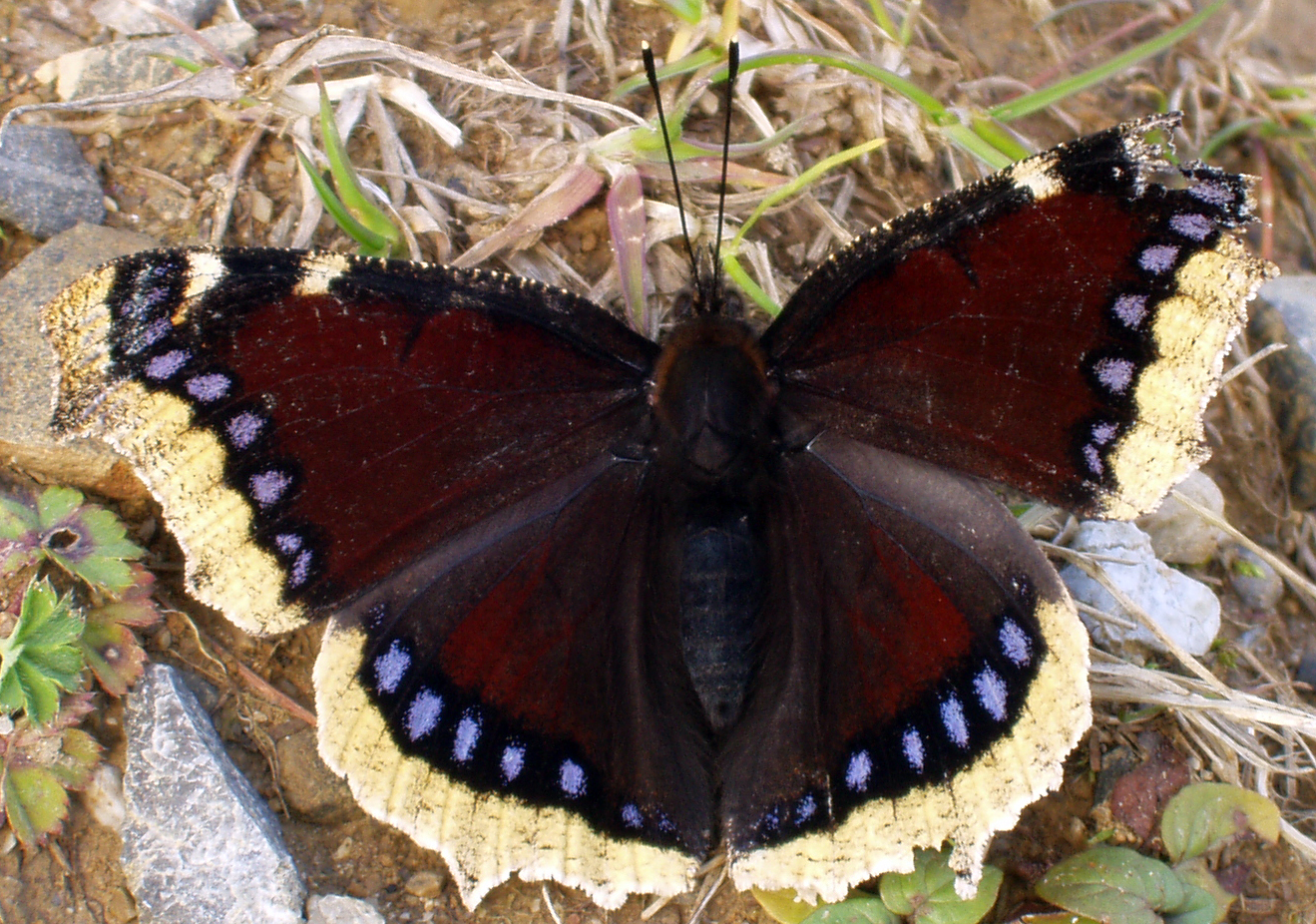
Camberwell beauty butterfly

The Camberwell beauty (also Camberwell Beauty) is a butterfly (Nymphalis antiopa) which is rarely found in the UK – it is so named because two examples were first identified on Coldharbour Lane, Camberwell in 1748. A large mosaic of the Camberwell beauty used to adorn the Samuel Jones paper factory on Southampton Way. The paper factory has since been demolished but the mosaic was removed and re-installed on the side of Lynn Boxing Club on Wells Way.

== Culture ==
=== Art ===
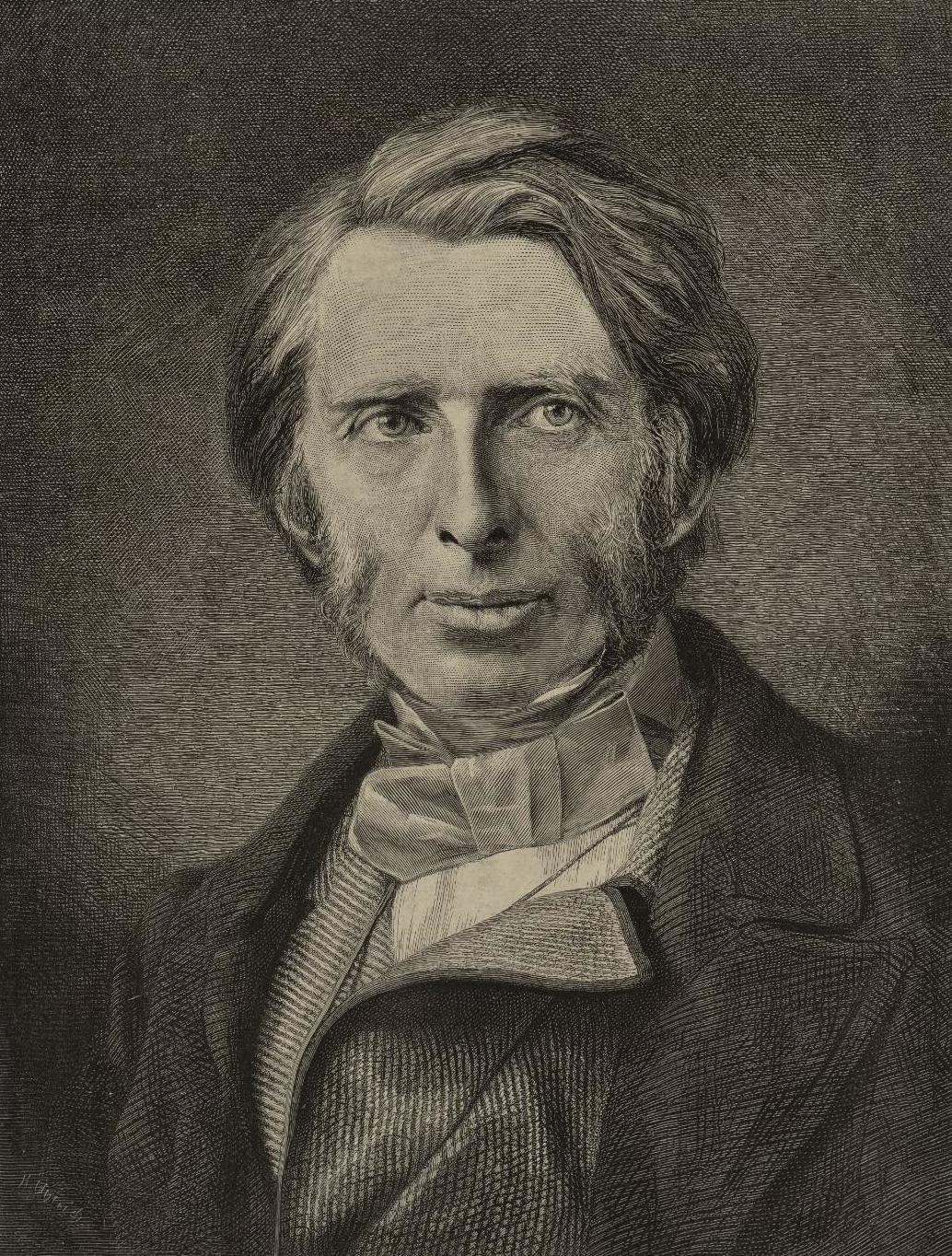
Wood-engraving of the Victorian art critic and watercolourist John Ruskin by Henry Sigismund Uhlrich. Ruskin lived in Camberwell for many years

Camberwell has several art galleries including Camberwell College of Arts, the South London Gallery and numerous smaller commercial art spaces. There is an annual Camberwell Arts Festival in the summer. The Blue Elephant Theatre on Bethwin Road is the only theatre venue in Camberwell.

A group now known as the YBAs (the Young British Artists) began in Camberwell – in the Millard Building of Goldsmiths' College on Cormont Road. Housed in the former building of St Gabriel's College, a former training college for women teachers, the Millard was the home of Goldsmiths Fine Art and Textiles department until 1988. It was converted to flats in 1996 and is now known as St Gabriel's Manor.

The core of the later-to-be YBAs, graduated from the Goldsmiths BA Fine Art degree course in the classes of 1987–90. Liam Gillick, Fiona Rae, Steve Park and Sarah Lucas, were graduates in the class of 1987. Ian Davenport, Michael Landy, Gary Hume, Anya Gallaccio, Henry Bond and Angela Bulloch, were graduates in the class of 1988; Damien Hirst, Angus Fairhurst, Mat Collishaw, Simon Patterson, and Abigail Lane, were graduates from the class of 1989; whilst Gillian Wearing, and Sam Taylor-Wood, were graduates from the class of 1990. During the years 1987–90, the teaching staff on the Goldsmiths BA Fine Art included Jon Thompson, Richard Wentworth, Michael Craig-Martin, Ian Jeffrey, Helen Chadwick, Mark Wallinger, Judith Cowan and Glen Baxter. Collishaw has a studio in a pub in Camberwell. as does the sculptor Anish Kapoor.

In his memoir Lucky Kunst, artist Gregor Muir, writes:

Not yet housed in the university building at New Cross to which it eventually moved in the late 1980s, Goldsmiths was a stone's throw away in Myatts Field on the other side of Camberwell Green. In contrast to Camberwell's Friday night bacchanal, Goldsmith's held its disco on a Tuesday evening with dinner ladies serving drinks, including tea, from a service hatch. This indicated to me that Goldsmiths was deeply uncool.

The building was also the hospital where Vera Brittain served as a nurse and described in her memoir Testament of Youth.

=== Literature ===
Thomas Hood, humorist and author of "The Song of the Shirt", lived in Camberwell from 1840 for two years; initially at 8, South Place, (now 181, Camberwell New Road). He later moved to 2, Union Row (now 266, High Street). He wrote to friends praising the clean air. In late 1841, he moved to St John's Wood. The Victorian art critic and watercolourist John Ruskin lived at 163 Denmark Hill from 1847, but moved out in 1872 as the railways spoiled his view. Ruskin designed part of a stained-glass window in St Giles' Church, Camberwell. Ruskin Park is named after him, and there is also a John Ruskin Street.

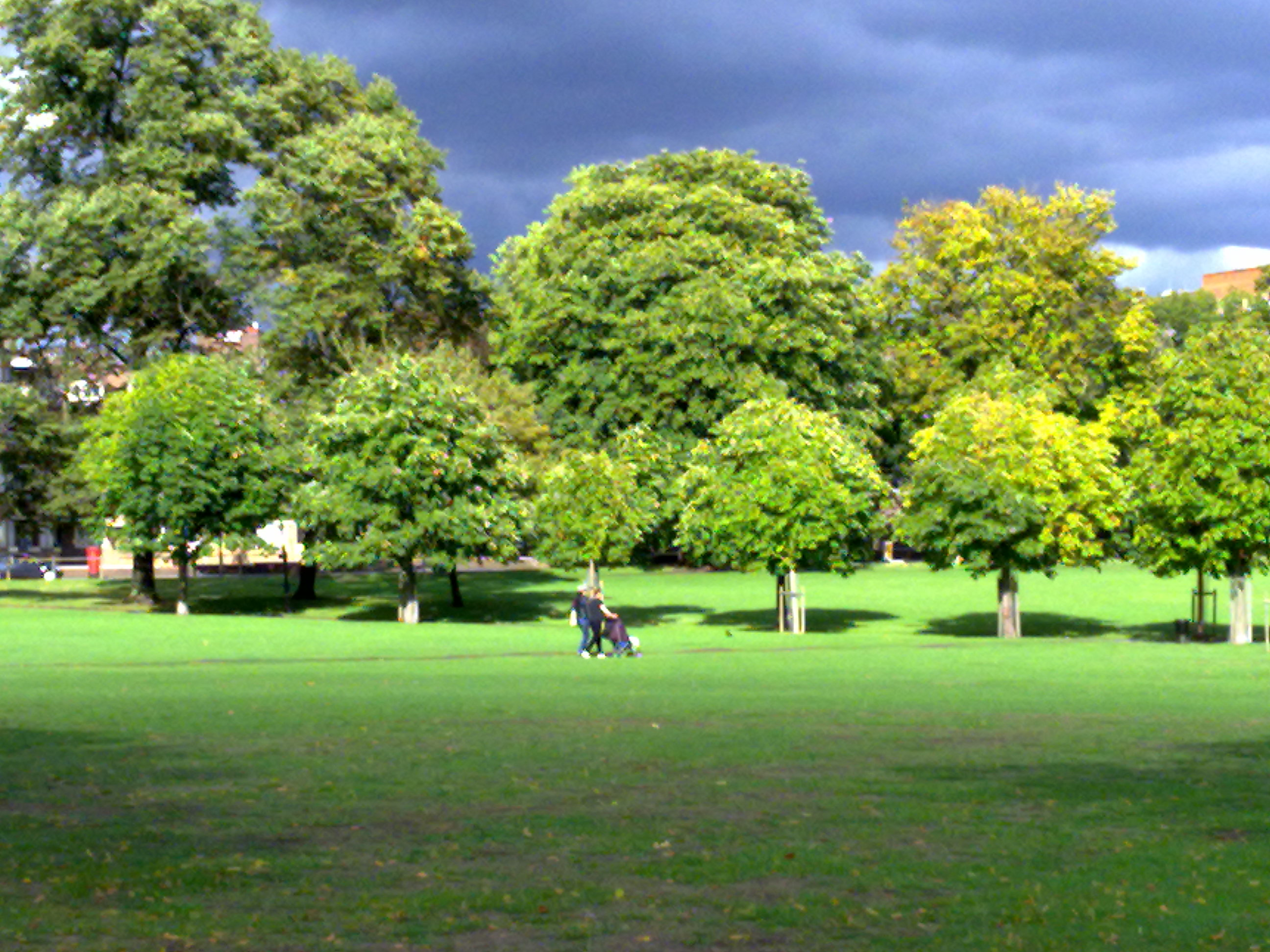
Peckham Rye Common

Another famous writer who lived in the area was the poet Robert Browning, who was born in nearby Walworth, and lived there until he was 28. Novelist George Gissing, in the summer of 1893, took lodgings at 76 Burton Road, Brixton. From Burton Road he went for long walks through nearby Camberwell, soaking up impressions of the way of life he saw emerging there." This led him to writing In the Year of Jubilee, the story of "the romantic and sexual initiation of a suburban heroine, Nancy Lord." Gissing originally called his novel Miss Lord of Camberwell.

Muriel Spark, the author of The Prime of Miss Jean Brodie and The Ballad of Peckham Rye lived, between 1955 and 1965, in a bedsit at 13 Baldwin Crescent, Camberwell. The novelist Mary Jane Staples, who grew up in Walworth, wrote a book called The King of Camberwell, the third instalment of her Adams family saga about Cockney life. Comedian Jenny Eclair is a long-term resident of Camberwell, and the area features in her 2001 novel Camberwell Beauty, named after a species of butterfly. Playwright Martin McDonagh and his brother, writer/director John Michael McDonagh, live in Camberwell. The 2014 novel The Paying Guests by Sarah Waters is set in 1920s Camberwell. In Daniel Defoe's novel Roxana (1724) the eponymous protagonist imagines her daughter, Susan, "drown'd in the Great Pond at Camberwell".

Nearby Peckham Rye was an important in the imaginative and creative development of poet William Blake, who, when he was eight, claimed to have seen the Prophet Ezekiel there under a bush, and he was probably ten years old when he had a vision of angels in a tree.

=== Music ===
The avant-garde band Camberwell Now named themselves after the area.

Basement Jaxx recorded three songs about Camberwell: "Camberwell Skies", "Camberskank" and "I live in Camberwell" which are on The Singles: Special Edition album (2005).

Florence Welch from British indie-rock band Florence and the Machine wrote and recorded a song entitled "South London Forever" on her 2018 album High as Hope based on her experience growing up in Camberwell, naming places such as the Joiners Arms and the Horniman Museum.

=== Festivals ===
Camberwell has played host to many festivals over the years, with the long-running Camberwell Arts Festival celebrating 20 years in 2014, and Camberwell Fair taking place on Camberwell Green in 2015, 2017 and 2018, resurrecting an ancient Fair that took place on the same green from 1279 to 1855. Since 2013, there is also an annual 10-day film festival – Camberwell Free Film Festival (CFFF) which is usually held in March/April in addition to special one-off screenings at other times of the year.

== Transport ==
=== History ===
Until the First World War, Camberwell was served by three railway stations – Denmark Hill, Camberwell Gate (near Walworth), and Camberwell New Road in the west. Camberwell Gate and Camberwell New Road were closed in 1916 'temporarily' because of war shortages, but were never reopened.

London Underground has planned a Bakerloo line extension to Camberwell on at least three occasions since the 1930s.

=== Rail ===
Denmark Hill and Loughborough Junction railway stations serve Camberwell, whilst Peckham Rye and East Dulwich are both approximately one mile (1.5 kilometres) from Camberwell Green. These stations are all in London fare zone 2. London Overground's Windrush line, Southeastern, and Thameslink trains serve Denmark Hill. There are regular rail services to various destinations across Central London. There are also direct rail links to destinations elsewhere in London and the South East from Denmark Hill.

London Overground's Windrush line connects the area directly to Clapham and Battersea in the west, and Canada Water and Dalston east London. Thameslink trains carry passengers to Kentish Town in the north, whilst some peak-time services continue to destinations in Hertfordshire and Bedfordshire, such as Luton Airport. Eastbound Thameslink services travel towards Orpington or Sevenoaks, via Peckham, Catford, and Bromley, amongst other destinations. Southeastern trains eastbound serve destinations in South East London and Kent, including Peckham, Lewisham, Gravesend, and Dover.

Loughborough Junction is on the Thameslink route between St Albans City and Sutton. This provides Camberwell with a direct link southbound to Herne Hill, Streatham, Tooting, Wimbledon, Mitcham, and Sutton, amongst other destinations in South London. Northbound services run through the City of London and St Pancras. Destinations north of St Pancras include Kentish Town and West Hampstead. A limited Southeastern service between Blackfriars and Kent runs through Loughborough Junction.

=== Bus ===
Camberwell is served by numerous London Bus routes. Routes through Camberwell typically run east–west between Vauxhall and Peckham, or north–south between Elephant & Castle and Brixton or Dulwich.

== Notable residents ==
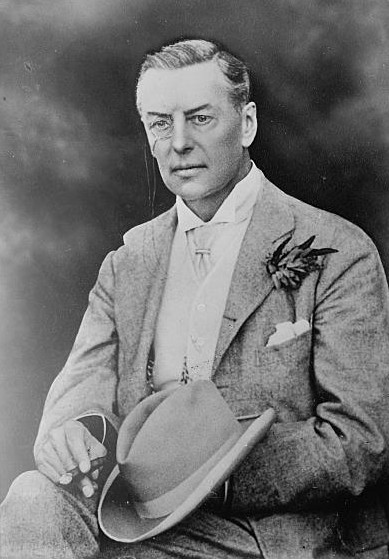
Statesman Joseph Chamberlain, born Camberwell, 1836 and father of Neville Chamberlain.

Residents of the area have included children's author Enid Mary Blyton, who was born at 354 Lordship Lane, East Dulwich, on 11 August 1897 (though shortly afterwards the family moved to Beckenham), and the former leader of the TGWU, Jack Jones, who lived on the Ruskin House Park estate. Karl Marx initially settled with his family in Camberwell when they moved to London in 1849.

Others include the former editor of The Guardian Peter Preston. The Guardian columnist Zoe Williams is another resident, whilst Florence Welch of the rock band Florence + the Machine also lives in the area, as do actresses Lorraine Chase and Jenny Agutter. Syd Barrett, one of the founders of Pink Floyd, studied at Camberwell College of Arts from 1964.

Elizabeth Patterson Bonaparte gave birth to her son, Jérôme Napoléon Bonaparte, the nephew of the Emperor Napoleon I, in Camberwell in 1805.

=== Other notable residents ===
- Tammy Abraham, professional footballer
- Henry Bessemer, inventor, had an estate in Denmark Hill
- John Bostock, professional footballer
- Stephen Bourne, British writer, film and social historian
- Jeremy Bowen, BBC war correspondent
- Thomas Brodie-Sangster, actor and musician
- Joseph Chamberlain, politician, born in Camberwell
- Florence Collingbourne (1880–1946), British actress and singer
- Catherine Dean, artist
- Alfred Domett (1811–1887), New Zealand politician and premier from 1862–63
- Leslie Grantham (1947–2018), actor
- Thomas Green (1659–1730)
- Giant Haystacks (1946–1998), British-Irish professional wrestler
- Albert Houthuesen, artist
- Marianne Jean-Baptiste, British actress, director and singer-songwriter
- Ida Lupino, Hollywood film actress and director, born in Herne Hill
- Martin McDonagh, British-born Irish playwright and filmmaker
- David McSavage, Irish stand-up
- William Henry Margetson, painter
- Erin O'Connor, fashion model
- Carolyn Quinn, BBC Radio 4 journalist
- James Ring (1856–1939), photographer, born in Camberwell
- William Rust, British communist activist, war correspondent, and first editor of the Morning Star, born in Camberwell
- Jadon Sancho, professional footballer, lived in Peckham
- Edward Burnett Tylor, anthropologist
- Ben Watson, professional footballer
- Jack Whicher, detective
- Florence Welch (b. 1986), musician and front woman of Florence and the Machine

== See also ==
- List of people from Southwark
- List of schools in Southwark
- Camberwell Public Baths
