= Frederic Bayco =

English organist and composer

Frederic Bayco, sometimes spelt Fredric Bayco (1913 – 1970) was an English organist and composer of light music, best known for his Tudor pastiche Elizabethan Masque. Born in London (as Frederick James Baycock) he attended Brighton School of Music, took lessions from organist R H Timberley and composer Eric Thiman, and attained his ARCO. He was later made a fellow of the Royal College of Organists (FRCO).

Before the war Bayco was a cinema organist (at the Gaumont, Union Street in Plymouth and on the Gaumont theatre circuit) and began to perform frequent theatre organ recitals, often broadcast by the BBC, at the Dominion Theatre in Tottenham Court Road, London and elsewhere. After war service in the Royal Air Force he became organist and director of music at Holy Trinity Church, Paddington, and also taught organ and musical appreciation at St Gabriel's College, London from 1948. He was Chairman of the Light Music Society in the 1960s.

Elizabethan Masque, a piece looking back on the ceremony and etiquette of the first Elizabethan era in the early years of the second, was composed in 1957. The 'pastorale' In Olden Times for piano (1958) takes similar inspiration. Other pieces that became well known include Lady Beautiful (1954), and his marches Royal Windsor and Marche Militaire. A Scherzo for organ was published by Edwin Ashdown in 1951.

Like many composers of the light music genre, he contributed a number of pieces to music libraries, such as KPM. (These were sometimes written under pseudonyms, including Frederick Boyce, Guy Desslyn, Peter Keane and William Field). As a result, his pieces Inferno and Finger of Fear have ended up being frequently used in programmes such as Count Duckula, The Ren & Stimpy Show and SpongeBob SquarePants. Many of his KPM library compositions have a historical or martial feel, for example the mock-heroic Joust. Other pieces appear to have unusual titles, for example Bear in a Buggy.

Bayco was married to the contralto Rosina Verne. In the 1950s they were living at 85 Woodlands, London NW10.
