= Arundell Esdaile =

British librarian (1880–1956)

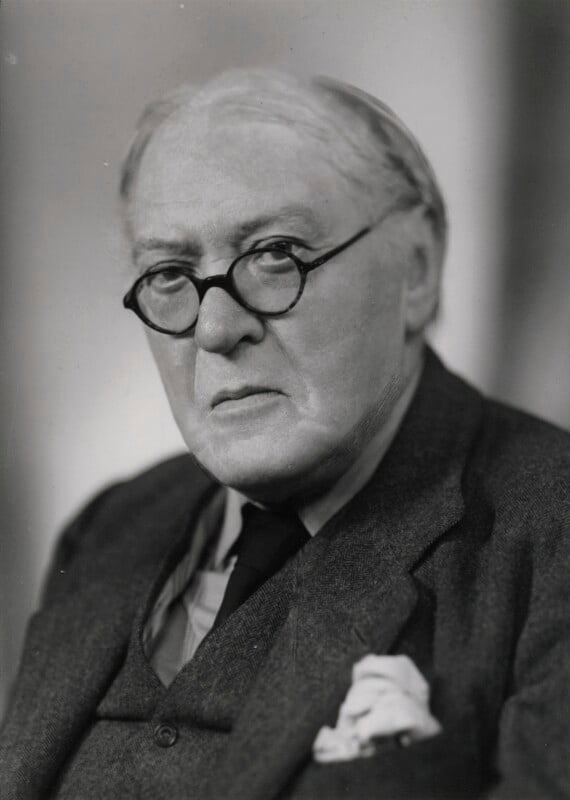
- Esdaile in 1950
- Born: Arundell James Kennedy Esdaile; 1880
- Died: 22 June 1956 (aged 75–76)
- Occupation: Librarian
- Known for: Secretary to the British Museum, 1926-40
- Spouse: Katharine Ada McDowall
- Children: 3
- Relatives: Ada Benson (mother-in-law)

Arundell James Kennedy Esdaile CBE FLA (1880 – 22 June 1956) was a British librarian, and Secretary to the British Museum from 1926 to 1940.

== Career ==
Secretary to the British Museum from 1926 to 1940, Esdaile was also president of the Library Association, and editor of its journal, the Library Association Record. In addition, he edited The Year’s Work in Librarianship and Sussex Notes and Queries.

In 1926, he delivered Cambridge University’s Sandars Lectures in Bibliography—one of the major British bibliographical lecture series—on the topic of "Elements of the bibliography of English literature, materials and methods". The lectures were published in 1928 under the title The Sources of English Literature: A Bibliographical Guide for Students.

Esdaile was appointed a CBE (Commander of the Order of the British Empire) in 1952; over a decade earlier, in 1939, the University of Liverpool had conferred on him an honorary doctorate.

== Personal life ==
In 1907, he married the art historian Katharine Ada McDowall, and they had a daughter followed by two sons.

He had a relationship with the writer and historian Amy Audrey Locke, and wrote of one of their meetings:

That evening we had found a meeting-place.
We sat together by the fire a space,
She knitted, and I smoked, who could not knit,
Mere useless man! But held her skein of wool
Up to be wound. So between silences
We talked ... Sure am I that none
Who had been there to see us, hear us speak
Indifferently almost, - had seen in us
The two poor secret lovers that we were
Met for an hour of stolen and hazardous
Gladness.

== Later life ==
Esdaile died on 22 June 1956.

== Selected publications ==
Academic works

- Catalogue of the Fifty Manuscripts & Printed Books Bequeathed to the British Museum by Alfred H. Huth. London: British Museum, 1912.
- A List of English Tales and Prose Romances Printed before 1740. London: Bibliographical Society, 1912.
- A Dictionary of the Printers and Booksellers Who Were at Work in England, Scotland and Ireland from 1668 to 1725. Oxford: Oxford University Press for the Bibliographical Society, 1922.
- The Sources of English Literature: A Bibliographical Guide for Students. Sandars Lectures 1926. Cambridge: Cambridge University Press, 1928.
- The British Museum Library: A Short History and Survey. Library Association Series of Library Manuals, 9. London: G. Allen and Unwin, 1948. Open Library
- National Libraries of the World; Their History, Administration and Public Services. 2nd rev. edn. London: Library Association, 1957.

Poetry

- Poems and Translations. London: Elkin Mathews, 1906.
- The Inviolable Shade. Boyle, Son and Watchurst, 1912.
- Wise Men From the West and Other Poems. Andrew Dakers, 1949.
