= Muriel Chapman =

English chemist

Muriel Catherine Canning Chapman
- Born: 16 September 1894; Rampisham, Dorset, England
- Died: 23 March 1988 (aged 93); Oxford, England
- Other name: Holmes
- Education: Oxford High School; Royal Holloway College; University of Oxford
- Spouse: D. L. Chapman
- Scientific career
- Fields: Chemistry
- Academic advisors: D. L. Chapman

Muriel Catherine Canning Chapman (née Holmes) (16 September 1894 – 23 March 1988) was an English chemist. She was one of the first female chemists at the University of Oxford, having matriculated there in 1920, the first year that women were permitted to do so. She was awarded a B.Sc. in 1923. She had already been awarded a B.Sc. from Royal Holloway College in 1916. Her research was in chemical kinetics, and was carried out in conjunction with her husband, David Chapman.

Chapman was the daughter of Samuel Holmes, a sometime theology lecturer at Jesus College, Oxford. She was educated at the Oxford High School for Girls before going to Royal Holloway. She then returned to Oxford and worked at the Leoline Jenkins Laboratory at Jesus College. In 1917, she became a member of the Society of Oxford Home-Students, which later became St. Anne's College.

After about 1927, she became active in the League for the Prohibition of Cruel Sports and was secretary of the Oxford branch throughout its existence.
