= Susan Lea (scientist) =

British structural biologist

Susan Lea FRS FMedSci
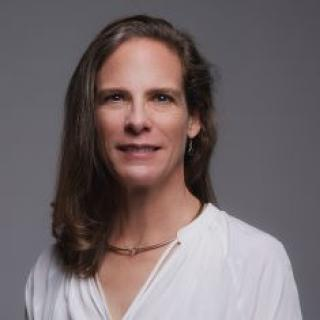
- Born: Susan Mary Lea; 1969 (age 56–57)
- Education: Oxford High School, England
- Alma mater: University of Oxford (MA, DPhil)
- Awards: EMBO Member (2015) Fellow of the Royal Society, F.R.S. (2022) Fellow of the Academy of Medical Sciences, F.Med.Sci (2017)
- Scientific career
- Fields: Structural biology
- Institutions: National Cancer Institute; National Institutes of Health; University of Oxford
- Thesis: Structural studies on foot-and-mouth disease virus (1993)
- Doctoral advisors: David Stuart
- Website: ccr.cancer.gov/staff-directory/susan-m-lea

Susan Mary Lea FRS FMedSci (born 1969) is a British biologist who serves as chief of the center for structural biology at the National Cancer Institute. Her research investigates host-pathogen interactions and biomolecular pathways. She was elected a Fellow of the Royal Society in 2022.

== Early life and education ==
Lea was educated at Oxford High School and New College, Oxford where she received a Bachelor of Arts degree in Physiological Sciences in 1990. Lea was a graduate researcher in the laboratory of molecular biophysics at the University of Oxford, where she worked under the supervision of David Stuart. During her doctoral research she made use of X-ray crystallography to better understand foot-and-mouth disease.

== Research and career ==
After her DPhil, she was awarded a Dorothy Hodgkin fellowship and started her independent research group in the department of biochemistry. Her research looked to understand the structure-property relationships of human enteroviruses and their receptors. Lea moved to the Sir William Dunn School of Pathology at Oxford, where she was appointed lecturer in 1999, with a tutorial fellowship at Brasenose College, Oxford, and chair of microbiology in 2016, with a professorial fellowship at Wadham College, Oxford. In 2021, Lea moved to the National Institutes of Health, and was appointed Chief of the Center for Structural Biology at the National Cancer Institute.

Lea makes use of structural information from cryogenic electron microscopy and x-ray crystallography to understand biomolecules and medical pathways. She is particularly interested in molecular complexes that can cross the cellular membrane. She studies the serum resident protein cascades that are involved in immune responses. Lea has studied the interactions that define bacterial meningitis and dysentery. She determined the molecular architecture of the flagellum.

=== Awards and honours ===
- Elected member of the European Molecular Biology Organization (EMBO)
- Elected Fellow of the Academy of Medical Sciences
- Elected Fellow of the American Society for Microbiology
- Elected Fellow of the Royal Society

=== Selected publications ===
Her publications include:

- Refinement of severely incomplete structures with maximum likelihood in BUSTER-TNT
- Structure of a major immunogenic site on foot-and-mouth disease virus
- The structure and function of a foot-and-mouth disease virus-oligosaccharide receptor complex
