= Kate Montgomery =

British artist (born 1965)

Kate Montgomery (born November 1965) is a British painter and art and design teacher known for her small-scale, detailed figurative works in casein paint. Her works draw on medieval and Islamic art, Symbolism and often feature interior spaces

== Early life and education ==
Kate Montgomery grew up in Horspath, a village near Oxford, attending its primary school. Her mother was the daughter of renowned army psychiatrist Lt-Colonel Harold Palmer. Her father was a historian, and a Quaker attender. His frugality accounted for the walls of their 1920s house being papered in a mixture of patterned wallpaper offcuts. Raised without a television, throughout her childhood Montgomery was involved in craft and making. She also practiced ballet and considered training as a choreographer.

Montgomery studied at Oxford High School before attending Ruskin School of Art and St John’s College, Oxford from 1985 to 1988. She went on to study for an MA in Visual Islamic & Traditional Arts within Fine Art at The Royal College of Art, in London from 1990 to 1992 under Keith Critchlow, Professor of Architecture.

== Early career ==
Following her graduation, Montgomery began exhibiting her work, with early solo shows at Cadogan Contemporary gallery in London (1994, 1996, 1998, 2000, 2009) and Gallery B in Föhr, Germany (1993).

== Painting ==
Montgomery's practice involves preliminary sketchbook drawing and finished works in pen and ink or casein paint (a traditional milk-based paint similar to egg tempera) on birch wood. She is influenced by French and Flemish Books of Hours, cloisonné work, European Symbolism and Art Nouveau. Family life, storytelling and domestic narratives are central themes, inspired by interiors and gardens of Georgian and Victorian houses and museums in Brighton and Hove, and the Sussex area, as well as the Arts and Crafts Movement and the geometrical designs of Islamic Art.

Her work is exhibited internationally, and regularly included in The Discerning Eye group show at The Mall Galleries, London and in the Royal Academy Summer Exhibition. It is in the collections of Vivien Duffield, Elizabeth Esteve-Coll, HRH King Charles III, the Cromwell Hospital in London, St John's College Oxford. Two pieces are in the Women’s Art Collection in Murray Edwards College, Cambridge.

Montgomery is represented by Long & Ryle Gallery, London, Sarah O'Kane Contemporary Art, Lewes, and Le Salon Vert, Geneva.

Recent group shows featuring paintings by Montgomery include:

- A Spirit Inside: Work by female and non-binary artists, The Women's Art Collection, Murray Edwards College Cambridge, and The Ingram Collection at Compton Verney (2024)
- Lines and Marks, Natasha O'Kane Sussex Art, Lewes, 2025
- Story Painters, Picture Writers, St John's College, Oxford, 2026 (also curated by Montgomery)
- Declarative Language, Amici Projects, Hastings, Sussex 2026

Solo shows include Dreamed House (2018), Pattern Book (2023) and Nuits Blanches, (2025), all at Long & Ryle gallery, London, and On Summery Afternoons, The Campden Gallery, Chipping Campden (2023).

== Teaching ==
Montgomery has taught art and design part-time since the 1990s. She has been a lecturer at Central St Martins where she ran Foundation Painting and Fine Art, and later at Northbrook College where she taught Cultural Studies on Fashion & Textiles degree programmes. She teaches drawing at The Royal Drawing School London on the public and post graduate programmes.

Montgomery has also been a visiting lecturer at Chelsea College of Arts, Camberwell College of Arts, Ravensbourne, The Prince of Wales’ Institute of Architecture and Brighton Museum and Art Gallery.

== Recognition ==
Kate Montgomery was awarded the Egerton Coghill Landscape Painting Prize by Oxford University in 1988. In 1992 Montgomery was artist in residence at the Prince of Wales' Institute of Architecture where she won the 1992 Prize.

In 1998, Montgomery was elected member of the London Group, one of the oldest artist-led organisations in the world, established in 1913.

Montgomery was an artist in residence at Glyndebourne Opera House in 2008 where she was asked to respond to the1893 Märchenoper (fairy-tale opera) Hansel & Gretel by Humperdinck.

A painting by Montgomery was used on the front cover of the 2019 album 'Til the Morning' by the Catenary Wires, whose singer Amelia Fletcher was at Oxford High School with Montgomery. Another painting was used for the cover image of the 2022 poetry collection Little Silver by Jane Griffiths. Montgomery also illustrated the 1997 children's book Razia: Warrior Queen of India (Heroes from the East) by Salman Asif.

== Personal life ==
Montgomery lives in Brighton. She has three daughters who often feature in her work. The oldest two are mental health clinicians for the National Health Service.
