= David Stuart (structural biologist) =

X-ray crystallographer

Sir David Stuart FRS FMedSci
- Born: David Ian Stuart; 8 December 1953 (age 72)
- Education: University of London (BSc); University of Oxford (MA); University of Bristol (PhD)
- Awards: Descartes Prize; Gregori Aminoff Prize; Knight Bachelor
- Scientific career
- Fields: Structural Biology; Virology; Crystallography; Synchrotron radiation
- Workplaces: Wellcome Trust Centre for Human Genetics; University of Oxford; Diamond Light Source
- Thesis: X-ray studies on pyruvate kinase (1979)
- Doctoral advisor: Hilary Muirhead
- Doctoral students: Susan Lea
- Website: www.strubi.ox.ac.uk/team/david-stuart

Sir David Ian Stuart (born 8 December 1953) is a Medical Research Council Professor of Structural Biology at the Wellcome Trust Centre for Human Genetics at the University of Oxford where he is also a Fellow of Hertford College, Oxford. He is best known for his contributions to the X-ray crystallography of viruses, in particular for determining the structures of foot-and-mouth disease virus, bluetongue virus and the membrane-containing phages PRD1 (the first structure of an enveloped virus) and PM2. He is also director of Instruct and Life Sciences Director at Diamond Light Source.

== Education ==
Stuart was born in 1953 in Lancashire. He was educated initially in Helmshore, Lancashire, and then in North Devon, at Barnstaple Grammar School. He studied Biophysics at King's College London, where he graduated with a BSc degree in 1974. He subsequently attended the University of Bristol and completed a PhD degree in the Biochemistry Department in 1979, working on the structure of the enzyme pyruvate kinase in the laboratory of Hilary Muirhead.

== Career and research ==
Stuart moved to Oxford in 1979 and worked with Louise Johnson on the structure of the enzyme glycogen phosphorylase before moving in 1981 to work at the Institute of Biophysics in Beijing, China, with Liang Dong-Cai on insulin. Returning to Oxford in 1983 to work with Johnson he then in 1985 set up his own research group in the Laboratory of Molecular Biophysics, focused mainly on virus–receptor interactions and virus assembly. In 1999 Stuart led the establishment of the Division of Structural Biology, in the Nuffield Department of Medicine.

Stuart has solved the atomic structures of complex biological molecules and viruses, including foot-and-mouth disease virus, bluetongue virus and the membrane-containing phages PRD1 (the first structure of an enveloped virus) and PM2. His structure of foot-and-mouth virus has assisted in the development of improved vaccines via structural vaccinology. He has also investigated the structure of the HIV reverse transcriptase protein, facilitating targeted drug design. Stuart also develops methods in structural biology and researches protein structure and evolution.

Since 2008 Stuart has, as life science director, helped the development of the Diamond Light Source, the UK's synchrotron light source. His former doctoral students include Susan Lea.

=== Honours and awards ===
Stuart has received a number of awards and honours for his work on viral structure, including:

- Federation of European Biochemical Societies (FEBS) Anniversary Prize (1990)
- Fellow of the Royal Society (FRS, 1996)
- Descartes Prize (2002)
- Fellow of the Academy of Medical Sciences (FMedSci, 2006)
- Gregori Aminoff Prize with Stephen C. Harrison by the Royal Swedish Academy of Sciences (2006)
- European Crystallographic Association Max Perutz Prize (2007)
- Honorary fil.Dr.h.c. degree, University of Helsinki, Finland (2010)
- Honorary DSc degree, University of Leeds (2011)
- Honorary DSc degree, University of Bristol (2015)
- Premio Città di Firenze for Molecular Sciences – Award from CERM (2016)
- Knighted in the 2021 New Year Honours for services to medical research and the scientific community
