= James Ring =

New Zealand photographer

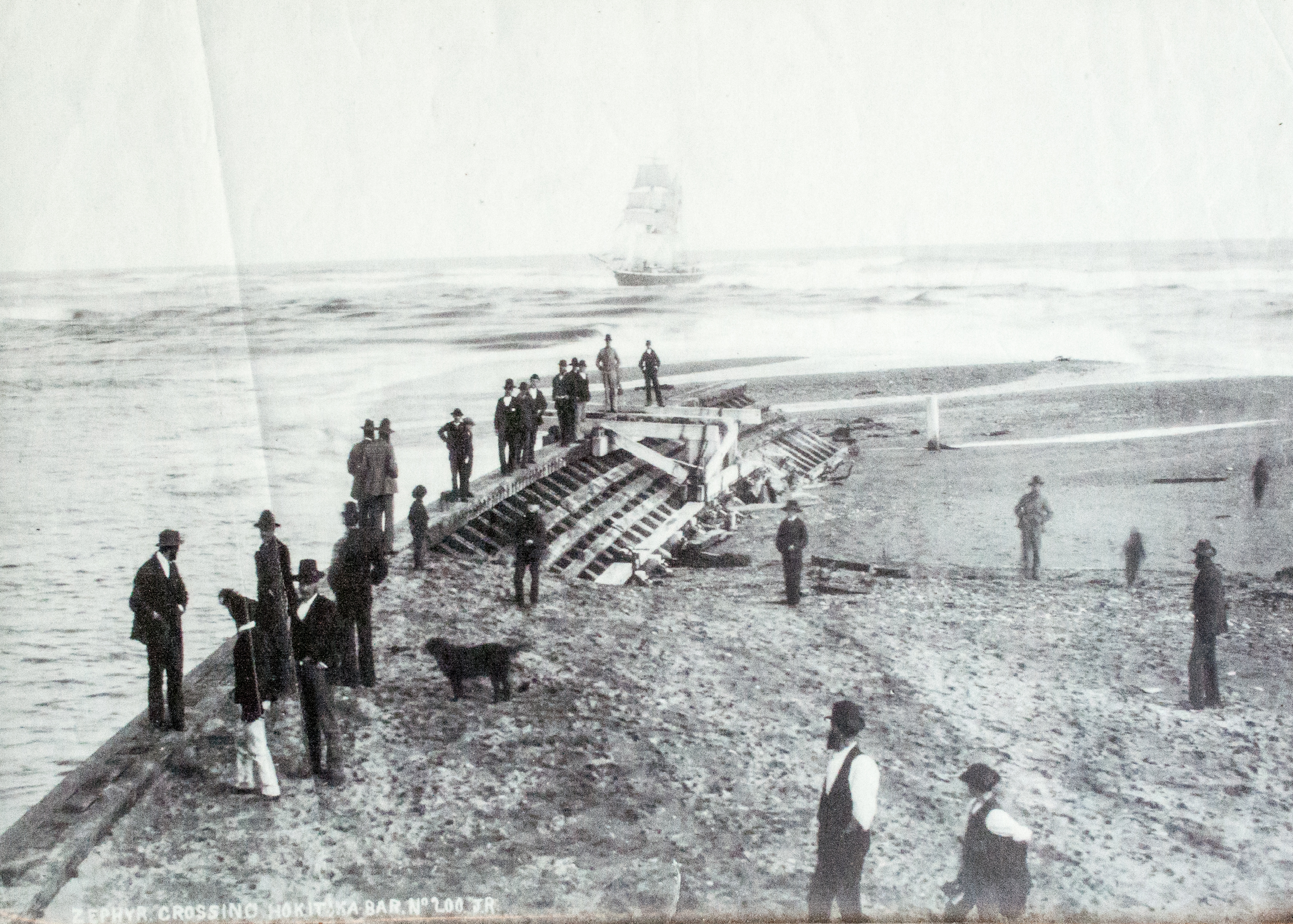
Zephyr crossing the bar at Hokitika, New Zealand, c. 1880

James Ring (1856–1939) was a New Zealand photographer. He was born in Camberwell, Surrey, England in 1856.
