= Matilda Ellen Bishop =

British academic principal

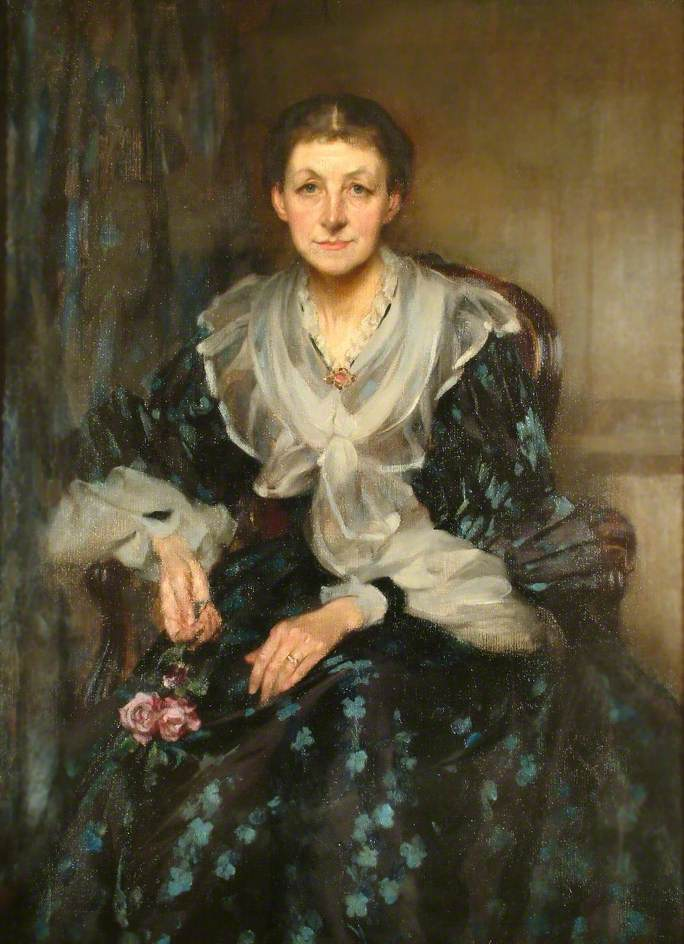
Miss Matilda Ellen Bishop by James Jebusa Shannon

Matilda Ellen Bishop (12 April 1842 in Tichborne, Hampshire – 1 July 1913 in Camberwell, London) was the first Principal of Royal Holloway College, University of London and was responsible for establishing many of the early traditions at the institution. Her father was a scholarly Church of England clergyman.

== Early life ==
Bishop was educated at a seminary for young ladies in Brighton, where she had to learn passages of the Bible by heart. She taught at Sunday School from the age of eleven. At sixteen (c.1858) she was sent to Queens College, Harley Street, London, and was deeply influenced by Revd F. D. Maurice.

== Career ==
She then followed a teaching career becoming the first deputy and the second headmistress of Oxford High School from 1879 to 1887. She was replaced by Lucy Soulsby.

Bishop was appointed as the first Principal of Royal Holloway College on its opening in 1887. The founder, Thomas Holloway had stipulated that the principal was to be an unmarried female, or a widow without children, under the age of 40, though the age restriction was lifted when there were no suitable applicants.

She was responsible for proposing the college provide scholarships to capable students, leading to the establishment of Royal Holloway's Founder's scholarships. She also interviewed the first teaching staff and her recommendations to the Governors of the college were approved. She is also credited with establishing many of the early traditions at the college, including 'College hours'. She initially encouraged the students to take Oxford degrees though Oxford did not admit women to its degrees until 1920. However, students were also entered for London University degrees where successful candidates had been awarded degrees since 1878. She later expressed the opinion that the college should become a constituent school of London University. This was established by her successor, Dame Emily Penrose in 1900 with Penrose becoming a member of London University Senate.

In 1897, she resigned when the governors wanted to introduce nonconformist services in the college chapel on alternate Sundays. The college founder, Thomas Holloway had stipulated that the college should be non-denominational.

In 1899, she became Principal of the newly founded St Gabriel's Church of England Training College for Women Teachers in Camberwell, and died in office in 1913. She never married though she had been engaged for a time before her appointment to Royal Holloway.

Academic offices
Preceded by New Creation	Principal; Royal Holloway College; University of London; 1887-1897	Succeeded by Dame Emily Penrose
