= Charles Edward Brooke School =

Former secondary school in London

- The school in 2009

- Shown in London
- 51°28′33″N 0°06′08″W
- Location: Camberwell, London

History
- Built: 1897–1898

Site notes
- Architect: T. J. Bailey
- Architectural style: Renaissance style

Listed Building – Grade II
- Official name: Kennington Boys' School
- Designated: 27 March 1981
- Reference no.: 1184669

Charles Edward Brooke School, originally constructed as Cormont Secondary School, was a Church of England secondary school in Cormont Road in Camberwell, London, England. The school, which is currently vacant and in need of significant repair, is a Grade II listed building.

== History ==
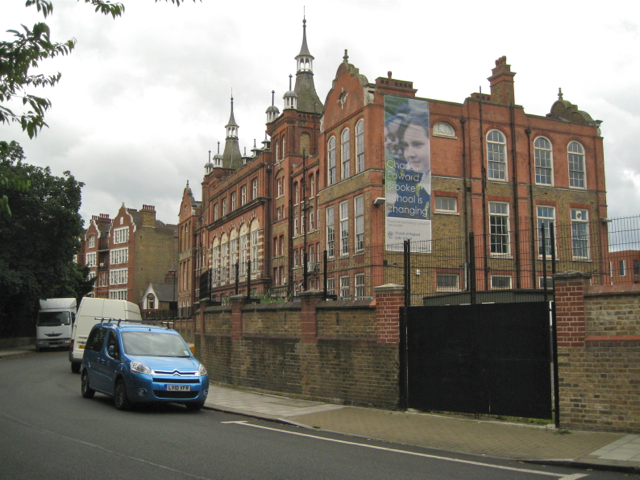
The former school building in 2013

The school was founded by the London School Board as Cormont Secondary School. Built by contractors Holliday and Greenwood of Brixton and designed by architect T. J. Bailey, it opened on 10 January 1898. The building involves a symmetrical main frontage in seven sections facing onto Cormont Road. These sections include a three-storey central block of five bays, flanked by six-storey towers surmounted by spires and, beyond that, three-bay wings surmounted by shaped gables.

During the First World War, the building was used together with the neighbouring St Gabriel's College as the 1st London General Hospital, a facility for the Royal Army Medical Corps to treat military casualties. The hospital closed in 1919. The poet and pacifist Vera Brittain worked as a nurse at the hospital during the war.

After the Second World War, the building became Kennington Boys' School and later the Charles Edward Brooke Girls' School, named after the "well-known Anglo-Catholic figure" and Vicar of St John the Divine, Kennington. From 2006 to 2008 it hosted the Charles Edward Brooke Refugee Centre.

After becoming vacant in 2012, the building was transferred to the ownership of Lambeth Council in 2021, but a survey commissioned by the council suggested repairs costing £1.5 million were needed.

The building was included on the Victorian Society's Top Ten Endangered Buildings list in May 2024.
