= Ada Benson =

British headmistress and educationist

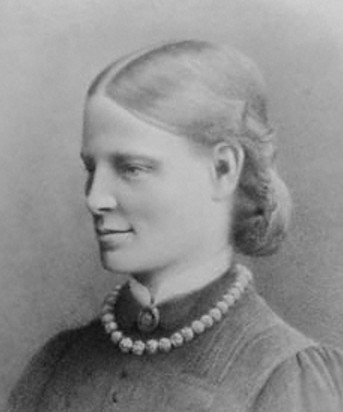
- by an unknown artist
- Born: 27 November 1840; Winson Green, Birmingham, England
- Died: 11 October 1882 (aged 41); Bedford, England
- Other names: Ada McDowall
- Occupations: Headmistress and educationist
- Children: Katharine Esdaile

Ada Benson or Ada McDowall (27 November 1840 – 11 October 1882) was a British headmistress and educationist. She is known for her leadership at Oxford High School, Norwich High School for Girls and Bedford High School for Girls.

== Life ==
Benson was born in Winson Green in 1840. In 1852 she and her siblings became orphans and the children were divided into different homes. Benson and her sister lived with Mary Sidgwick and her husband who was a Reverend in Rugby. Benson's education was overseen by her elder brother Edward White Benson who lived locally and who was in time to be the Archbishop of Canterbury. When she was nineteen her brother agreed that she could continue to study and work as a governess in Germany. Her German was good enough for her to be able to publish her translation of John Ruskin's King of the Golden River in 1861. Some kind of mental illness meant that she had to return to England. She did however start a school with her sister but although successful it was wound up on her sister Eleanor's marriage in 1872 to Thomas Hare.

Benson founded Oxford High School and it was opened on 3 November 1875, with twenty-nine girls and three teachers with Benson as head. The school was at the Judge's Lodgings at 16 St Giles', central Oxford. It was the 9th school opened by the Girls' Public Day School Company. As the school was also the Judges' Lodgings, all the pupils were given a holiday when the Assize Judge visited. The school moved to 38 St Giles' in 1879 but by then the head was Matilda Ellen Bishop as Benson was obliged to resign again due to illness.

She is also known for her leadership at Norwich School and Bedford School.

Benson died in Bedford.
