= Gordon Hospital =

The Gordon Hospital
- Central and North West London NHS Foundation Trust
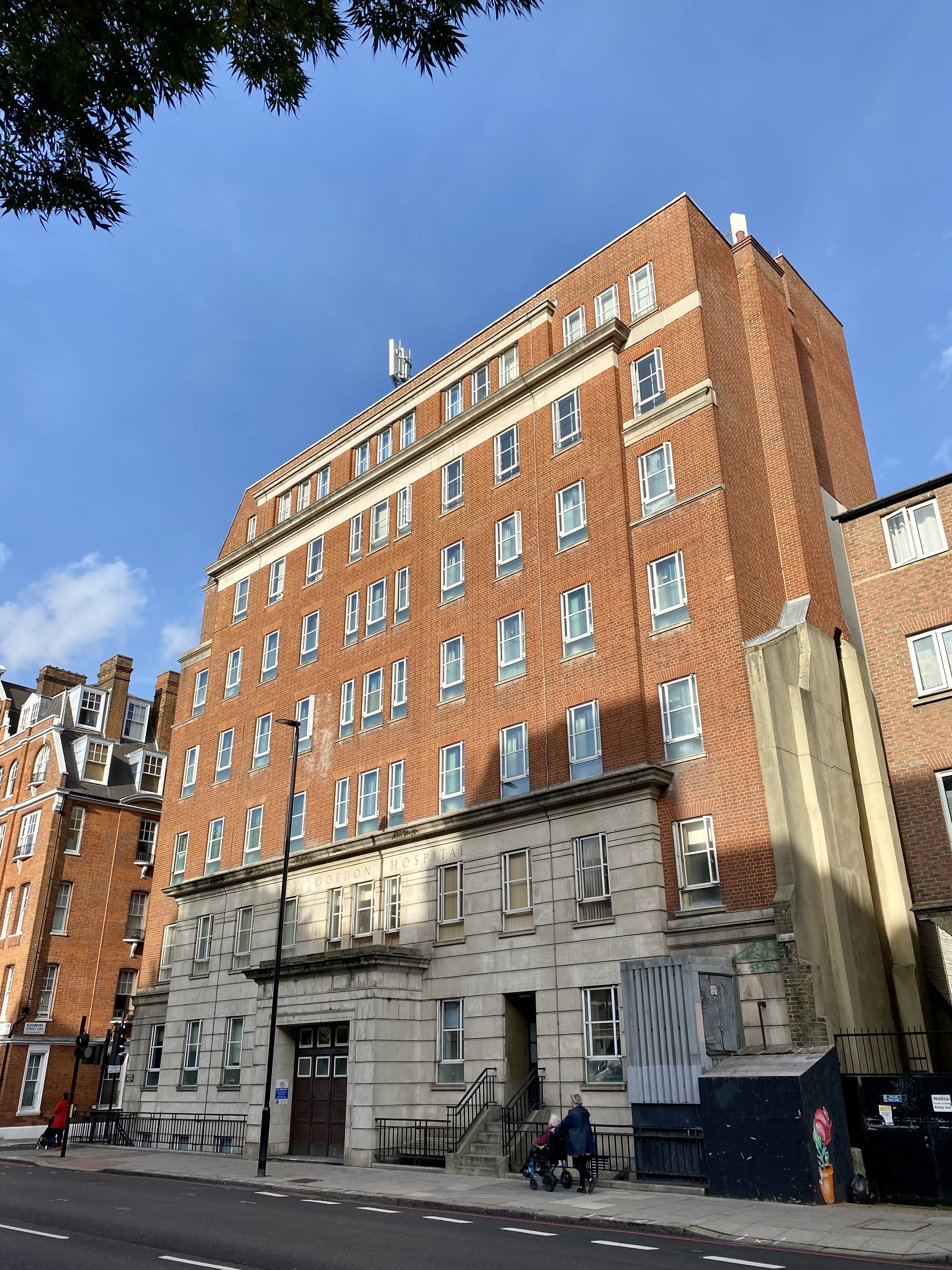
- The Gordon Hospital from Vauxhall Bridge Road

- Shown in Westminster

Geography
- Location: Westminster, England
- Coordinates: 51.4922°N 0.1360°W

Organisation
- Care system: NHS

Services
- Emergency department: No

History
- Founded: 1884

Links
- Lists: Hospitals in England

The Gordon Hospital is a 55-bed acute adult mental health hospital located in Westminster, London. It is managed by the Central and North West London NHS Foundation Trust.

== History ==
The hospital was founded at 278 Vauxhall Bridge Road as the Western Hospital for Fistula, Piles and other Diseases of the Rectum in 1884. In 1886 it changed its name in honour of Major-General Charles Gordon, also known as Gordon of Khartoum. During the 1930s the hospital gained an international reputation for the treatment of colon cancer. Later in that decade the building underwent extensive reconstruction and extension much of it funded by the racehorse owner, John Arthur Dewar, nephew of Lord Dewar. It closed during the Second World War but reopened in 1947 as a mental health hospital under its current name. When it joined the National Health Service, it merged with the erstwhile Westminster Hospital. Today the main entrance is on Bloomburg Street.

== Facilities ==
There are three inpatient wards, Gerrard Ward, Ebury Ward and Vincent Ward, which provide care for adults undergoing assessment or treatment for mental health conditions. The hospital also has a designated "health-based place of safety" suite and an outpatients department. There was a psychiatric intensive care unit (Belgrave Ward) until 2013 when this was closed as part of service reconfigurations.

== 2020 Covid 19 emergency ==
Early in the pandemic the Central and North West London NHS Trust announced the sudden closure on 24 March 2020 of the three wards at the Gordon Hospital on the grounds of safeguarding the safety of staff and patients. It is unclear whether this is an opportune permanent closure. The claim by service managers is that Westminster patients will receive a "more local service" at St Charles' Hospital in the north of the neighbouring borough of Kensington and Chelsea, several miles away. The trust have also stated that they aim for patients to be treated closer to home where possible, in line with the NHS's long-term plan for provision of care in the community rather than using inpatient beds.
