= Catherine Dean (artist) =

- Born: 16 October 1905; Liverpool, England, United Kingdom
- Died: 24 January 1983 (aged 77)
- Education: Liverpool School of Art; Royal College of Art (1926)
- Known for: Landscape painting Still life
- Spouse: Albert Houthuesen (1931-1979)

Catherine Dean (also known as Catherine Houthuesen) (16 October 1905 – 24 January 1983) was a British landscape and still-life artist, and at St Gabriel's Training College at the University of London, she was an instructor and head of the Art Department.

== Early life and education ==
Catherine Dean was born in Liverpool on 16 October 1905. Due to poor health, she attended a small private school from 1912 to 1920.

Dean obtained a scholarship to Liverpool School of Art in 1921. She was awarded a traveling scholarship and a scholarship to attend the Royal College of Art (RCA) in 1926. She met Albert Houthuesen, a fellow art student, in 1927. The following year she received a diploma in ARCA. In 1929 she took one year postgraduate training at RCA in painting.

== Career ==
She taught art in Manchester at Withington School for Girls beginning in 1929. She was a part-time lecturer at LCC training college and taught classes for teachers at Blackheath and Camberwell Schools of Art between 1931 and 1937.

In 1931, she married Albert Houthuesen. Sheep's Skull and Ferns (1935) is in Tate's collection.

She taught art at University of London's St Gabriel's Training College and became a lecturer in 1939, Senior Lecturer in 1945, and was made Principal Lecturer in 1956. She was known for her sensitivity and ability to bring out student's best qualities. During World War II, the college evacuated to Coventry and later near Doncaster. In 1945, she returned to London, but had no home. She became warden of the Elephant and Castle student's hostel. She lived with friends near Oxted in 1950 and purchased a house in Camberwell in 1952.

A third-year course with Catherine Houthuesen was offered to students to advance beyond the standard two-year art program. Her husband found works of art which became the 61-item St Gabriel's College Collection that spanned four centuries. In 1967, Catherine Houthuesen retired.

== Later years ==
Houthuesen took care of her seriously-ill husband from her retirement until his death in 1979. She then coordinated the Memorial Exhibition of Paintings and Drawings by Albert Houthuesen (1903–79) held in 1981 at the South London Art Gallery. In 1982, a solo exhibition of her work was held in London at the Mercury Gallery.

She died on 24 January 1983 and a memorial exhibition was held the following year at the Mercury Gallery.
