= St Gabriel's College (teacher training college) =

Former teacher training college in London

- The former college building in 2017

- Shown in London
- 51°28′29″N 0°06′19″W
- Location: Camberwell, London

History
- Built: 1900

Site notes
- Architect: Philip A. Robson
- Architectural style: Art Nouveau

Listed Building – Grade II
- Official name: St Gabriel's College
- Designated: 27 March 1981
- Reference no.: 1080484

St Gabriel's College was a Church of England training college for female schoolteachers in Cormont Road in Camberwell, London, England. The college was founded in 1899, and was integrated into Goldsmiths' College, University of London in 1977.

From 1978 to 1988, the college's former building was known as the Millard Building, and was used by Goldsmiths for its Fine Art, Embroidery/Textiles, and Art History teaching. The building was subsequently converted for residential use.

== History ==
The college was founded in 1899 by Charles Edward Brooke, the vicar of St John the Divine, Kennington, in consultation with Matilda Ellen Bishop, the former Principal of Royal Holloway, who became the college's first Principal until her death in 1913.

The former chapel in 2013

The college was housed in a purpose-built Art Nouveau building, designed by Philip A. Robson and built in red brick by J. Garrett and Son. The foundation stone was laid by Lady Cicely Gore, Viscountess Cranborne, on 14 July 1899, and the building was completed in 1900. The central gabled porch features a statue of St Gabriel. The chapel, a personal gift by Brooke, was dedicated in 1903. The building is Grade II listed. In its first year, the college operated from houses in Denmark Hill and Vassall Road, moving into its building in September 1900.

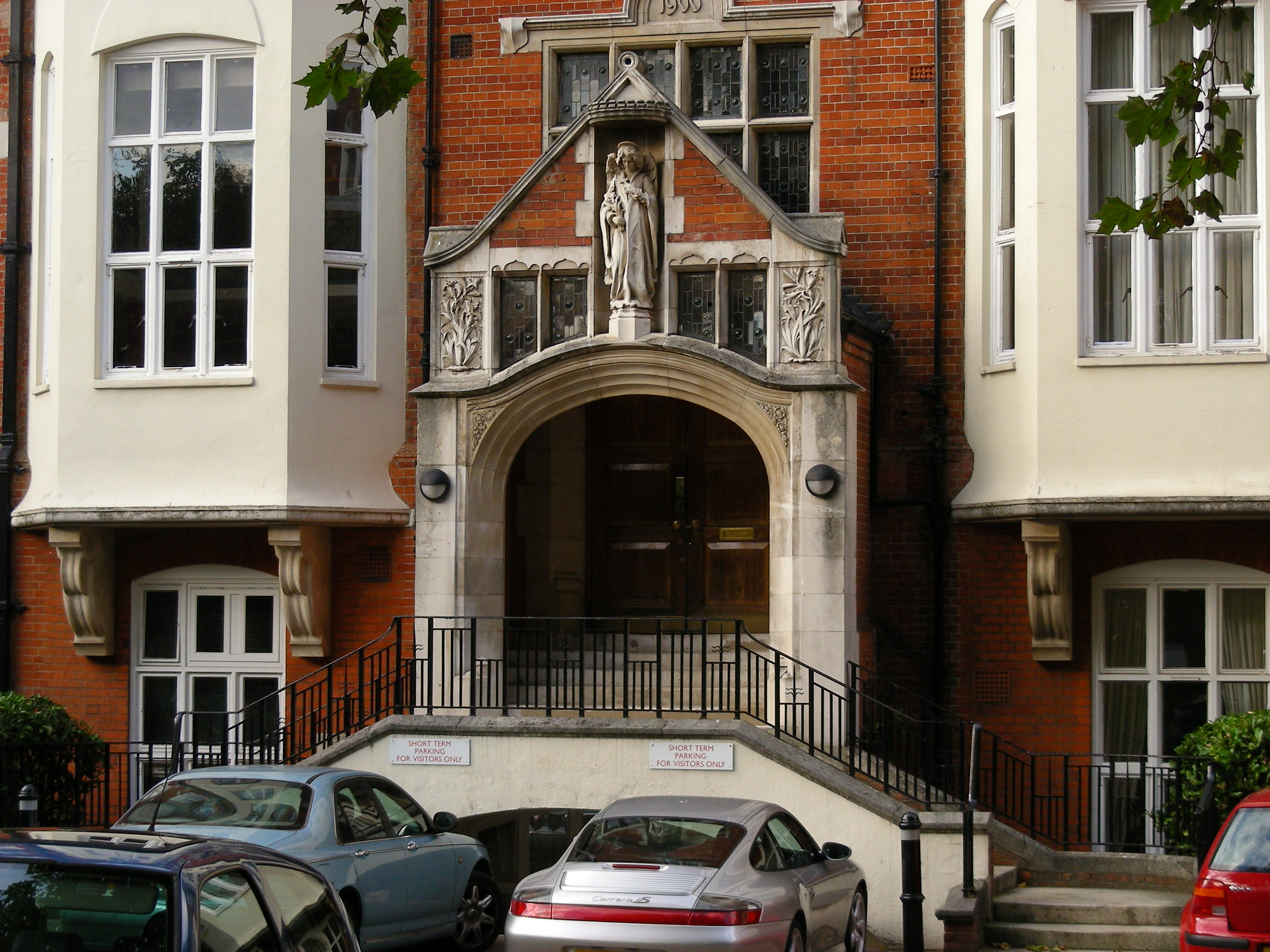
The entrance in 2011

During the First World War, the building was used together with the neighbouring Cormont Secondary School as the 1st London General Hospital, a facility for the Royal Army Medical Corps to treat military casualties. The hospital closed in 1919. The poet and pacifist Vera Brittain worked as a nurse at the hospital during the war. During this period, the college was evacuated to Culham College, which was empty of its male students on account of the war.

The college was evacuated to Doncaster during the Second World War, during which the college's buildings were severely damaged by bombing in 1941.

The college was extended and developed in the 1960s and early 1970s. However, a national reorganisation of teacher training colleges led to the merger of the college into Goldsmiths' College, University of London in 1977, with the final cohort of students completing their course in 1978. The building was sold to Goldsmiths, and the St Gabriel's Trust was founded from part of the proceeds of the sale.

From 1978, the former college building was used by Goldsmiths, which moved its Fine Art, Embroidery/Textiles and Art History to the building, and renamed it the Millard Building after Patrick Ferguson Millard, Principal of the School of Art from 1958 to 1967. These activities moved to the main Goldsmiths site in New Cross in 1988, and the building was sold. At this point, the restrictive covenant on the chapel was lifted: the organ was removed in 1990 to St Stephen's Church, Lewisham; the memorial to Brooke was transferred to the Charles Edward Brooke School; and the reredos was transferred to the lady chapel at St John the Divine, Kennington, becoming a permanent memorial to the college. The building was subsequently converted to residential use.

The St Gabriel's Trust continued to operate until 2012, when it merged with the Culham Trust to create a new trust, Culham St Gabriel's.

The college's archives are now held at Lambeth Palace Library.

== Principals ==
The principals of the college were as follows:

- 1899–1913: Miss M. E. Bishop
- 1913–1930: Miss K. T. Stephenson
- 1930–1943: Miss F. M. Johnson
- 1943–1956: Dr. P. V. McKie
- 1956–1964: Miss M. Atkinson
- 1965–1978: Miss J. Blackburn

== People associated with the college ==
Notable people associated with the college include:

- Frederic Bayco (1913–1970), music instructor
- Matilda Ellen Bishop (1842–1913), first Principal of the college
- Catherine Dean (1905–1983), art instructor
- Marjorie Reeves (1905–2003), lecturer in history
- Martha Annie Whiteley (1866–1956), science lecturer
