= Founder's Building =

University building in Surrey, England

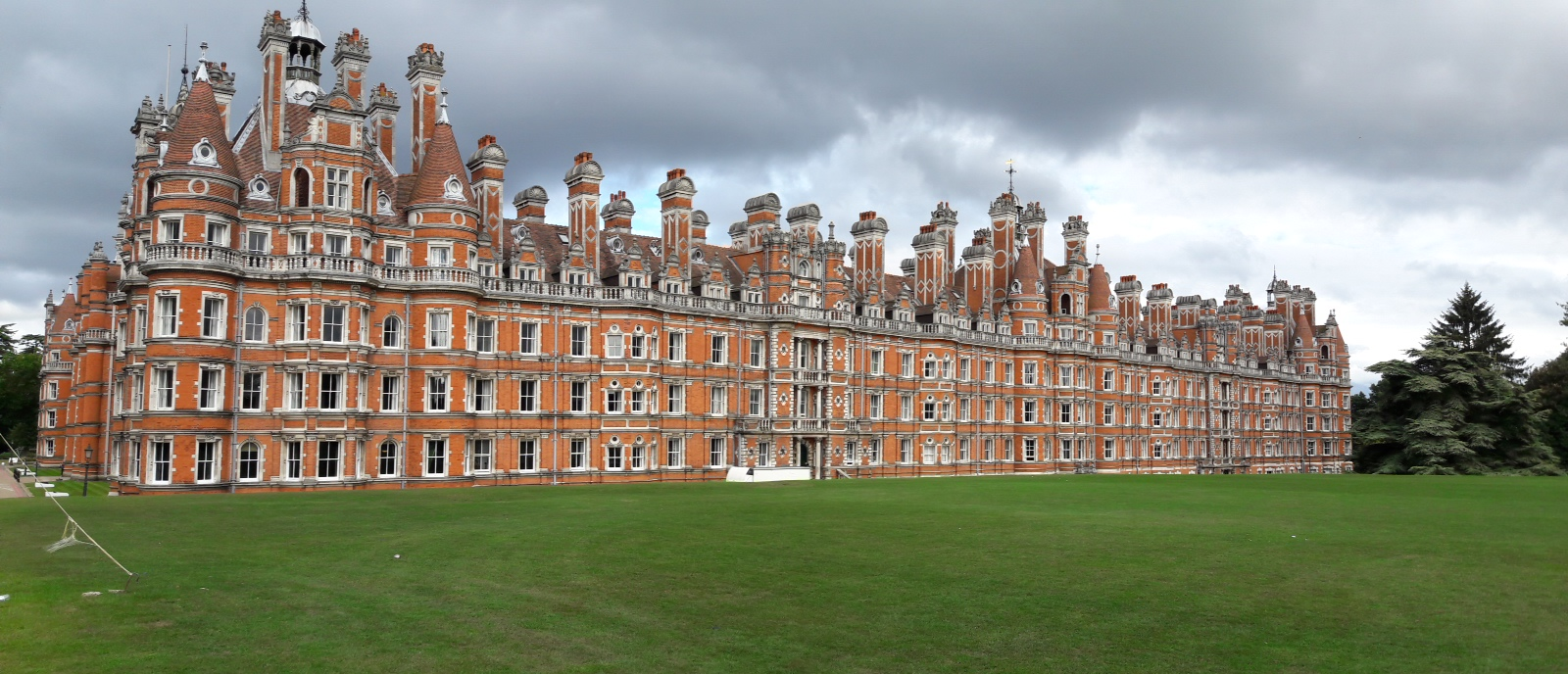
- Founder's Building of Royal Holloway, University of London

- Location within Surrey

General information
- Architectural style: French Renaissance
- Location: Egham, Surrey, England
- Coordinates: 51°25′29″N 00°34′00″W
- Construction started: 1874
- Completed: 1881
- Inaugurated: 1886
- Cost: £600,000
- Client: Thomas Holloway

Design and construction
- Architect: William Henry Crossland

Listed Building – Grade I
- Official name: Royal Holloway College
- Designated: 17 November 1986
- Reference no.: 1028946

The Founder's Building is the original building of Royal Holloway, University of London, in Egham, Surrey, England. It is an example of French-Renaissance-style architecture in the United Kingdom, having been modelled on French chateaux such as Château de Chambord. Today it is the dominant building on the campus.

== History ==
The construction of the building began in 1874, and was completed in 1881. The building and the college were a £600,000 "gift to the nation" by the entrepreneur and philanthropist Thomas Holloway. It was designed by the architect William Henry Crossland, and inspired by the Château de Chambord in the Loire Valley, France.

The building was officially opened in 1886 by Queen Victoria, who allowed the use of "Royal" in the college's name by Royal mandate. A statue of Queen Victoria sits in the centre of the north quadrangle. The centre of the south quadrangle contains a statue of Thomas Holloway and his wife Jane. The marble statues were sculpted by Prince Victor of Hohenlohe-Langenburg (Count Gleichen).

The Founder's Building houses the Picture Gallery, containing a collection of over 70 pieces of Victorian era art given to the college at the time of its founding by Thomas Holloway. Founder's is home to one of the university's lecture theatres, the non-denominational chapel, and the reading room, which is open to students 24/7. The north tower is known as the Clock Tower, the south as the Dragon Tower (due to its dragon like gargoyles), and the centre tower as the Lantern Tower, housing a lantern which is very occasionally lit.

Many of the college's main administrative offices remain within the Founder's Building. It is also a hall of residence for the campus, with rooms for over 550 students. A bar within the building is named "Crosslands" in honour of its architect.

The original building plans as well as photographs at the time of completion are available for viewing in the Royal Holloway archives.

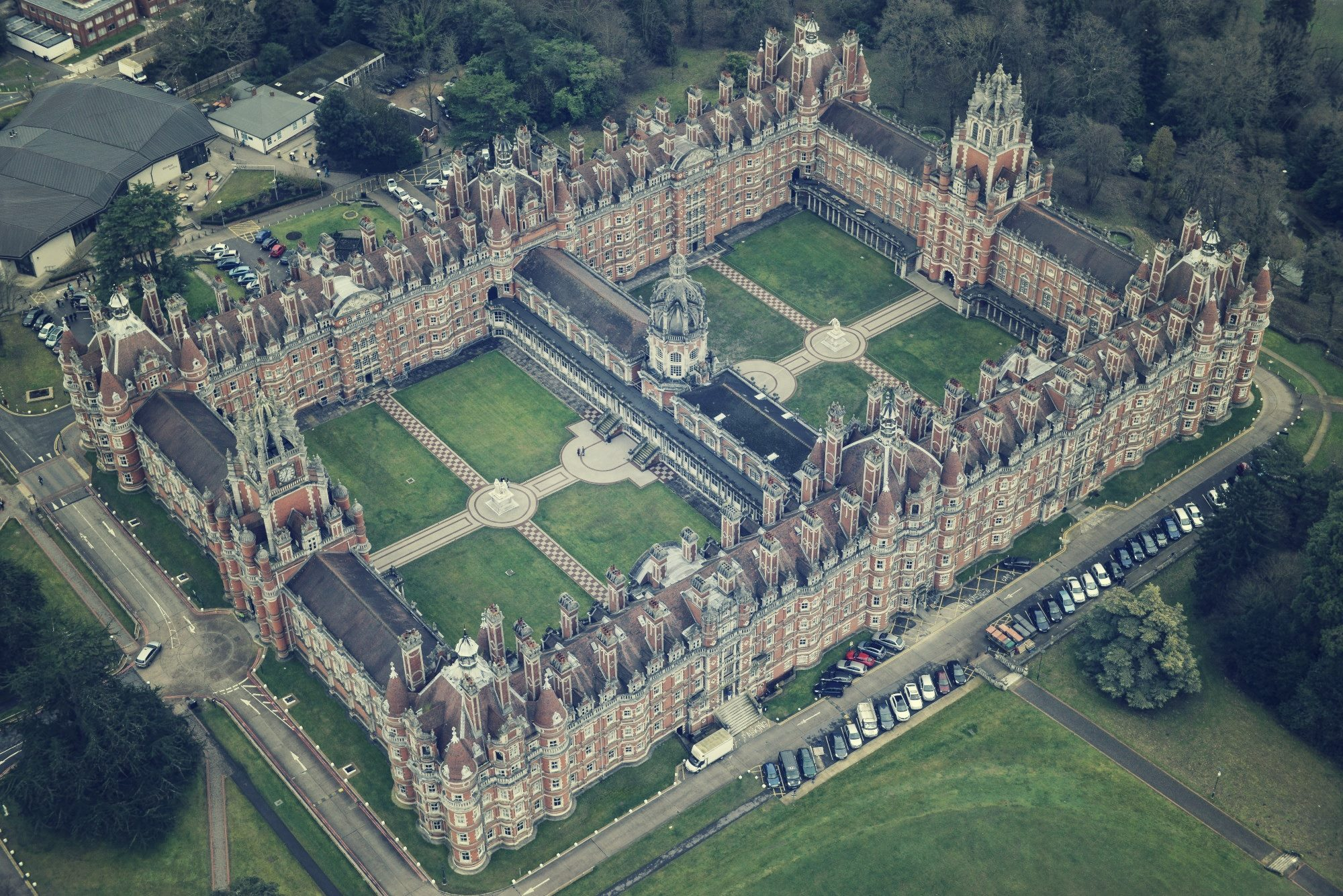
Aerial view

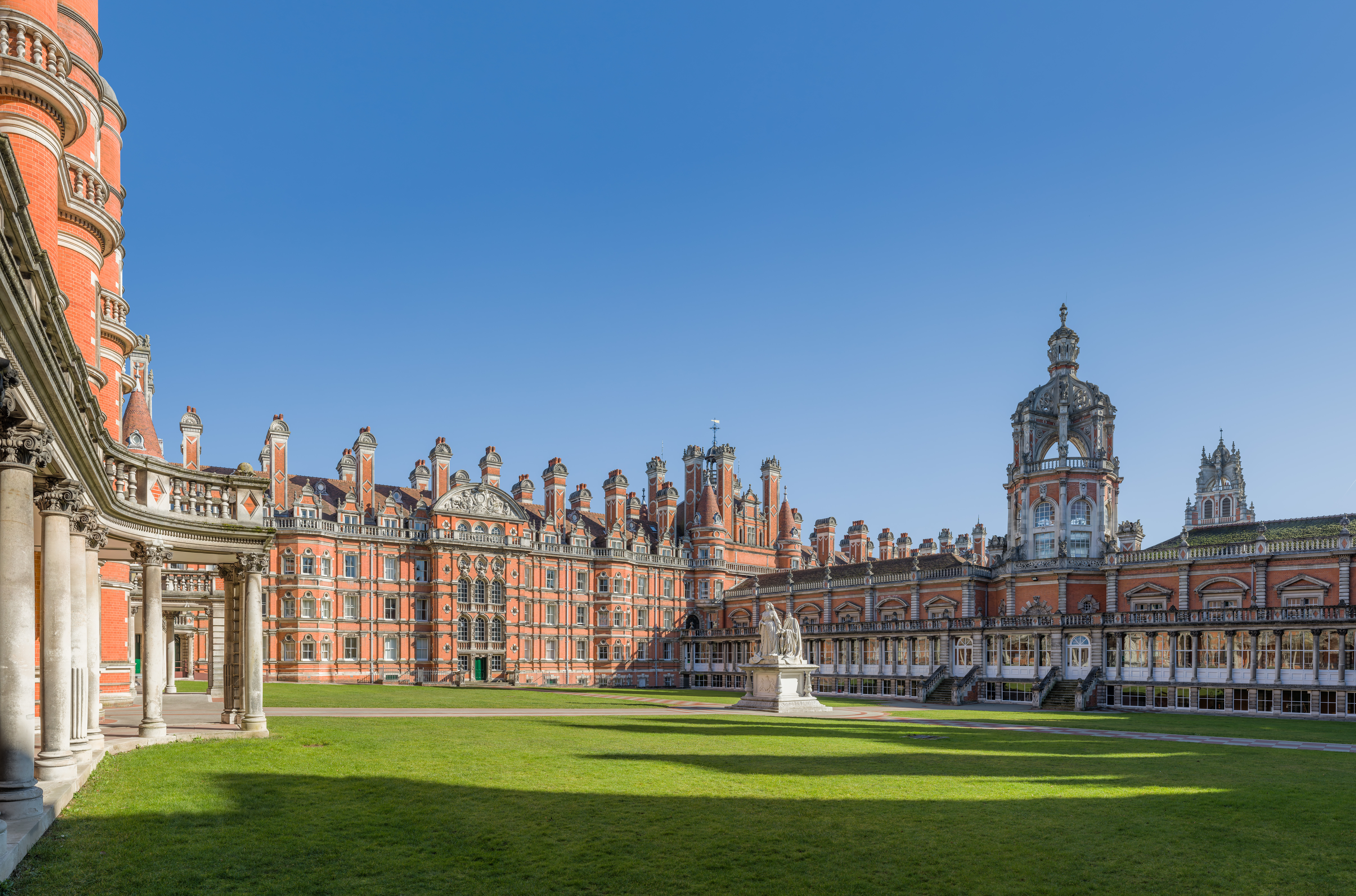
North quad

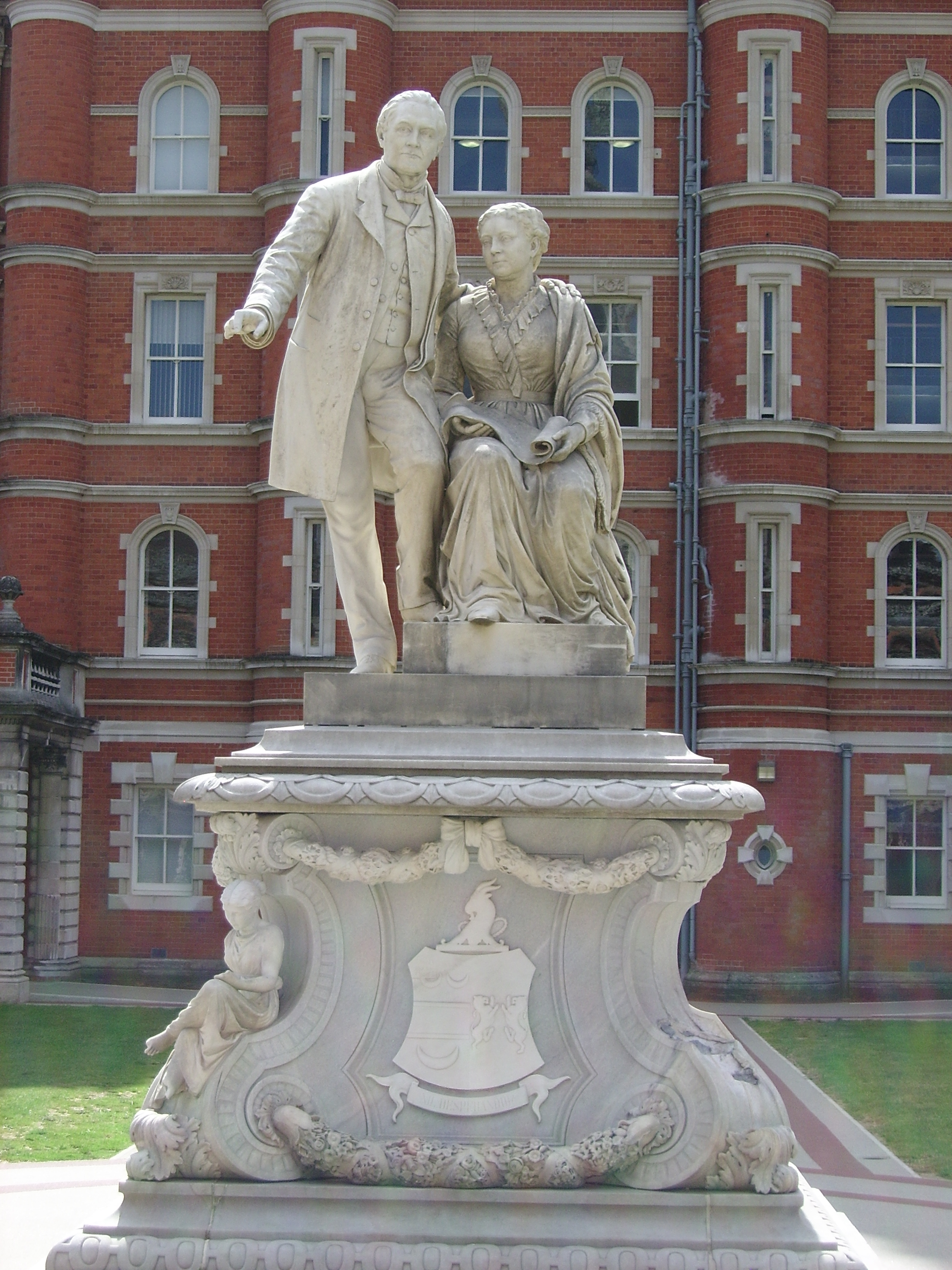
Statue of Thomas and Jane Holloway

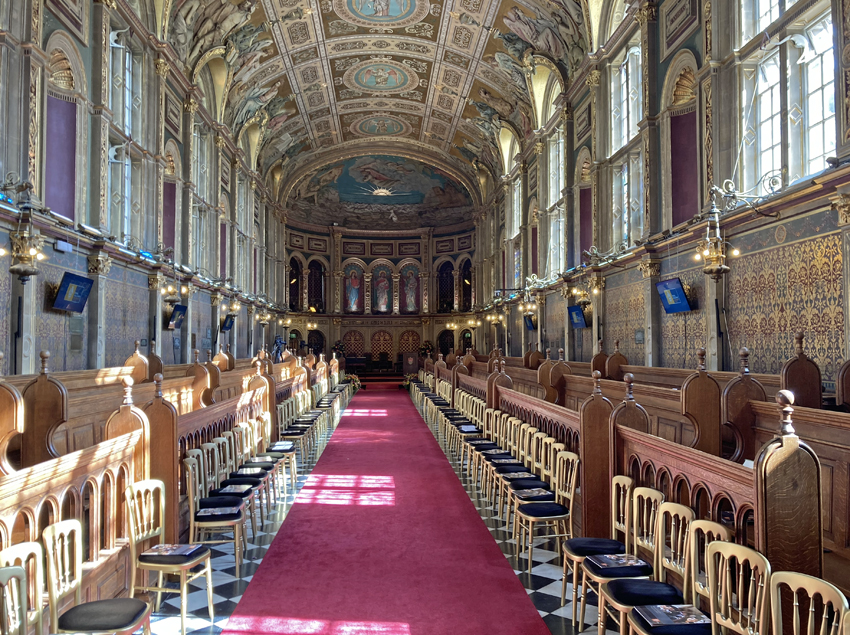
Interior of the chapel

== Filming location ==
The building has been featured in several films and television programmes including:

- 1968 – Salt and Pepper
- 1992 – Howards End
- 2001 – Antiques Roadshow
- 2002 – Midsomer Murders – Murder on St. Malley's Day
- 2006 – Basic Instinct 2
- 2009 – Trinity
- 2012 – Celebrity MasterChef
- 2013 – Downton Abbey
- 2015 – Avengers: Age of Ultron
- 2017 – Delirium
- 2018 – The Split
- 2019 – Jack Ryan
- 2021 – Call the Midwife
- 2023 – You
- 2024 – Silent Witness – Grievance Culture
