= Holloway Sanatorium =

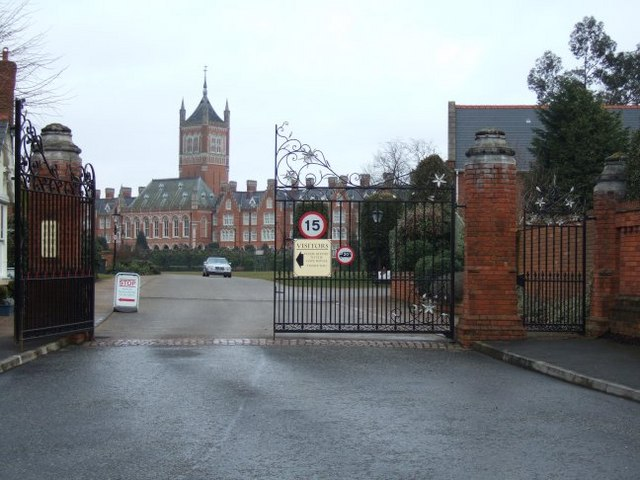
- Holloway Sanatorium, now Virginia Park, in 2006

- Location within Surrey

Geography
- Location: Virginia Water, Surrey, England
- Coordinates: 51°24′16″N 0°33′36″W

Organisation
- Care system: NHS
- Type: Mental health

History
- Founded: 1873
- Closed: 1980

Links
- Lists: Hospitals in England

Holloway Sanatorium was an institution for the treatment of those suffering temporary mental illness, situated on 22 acres (9 ha) of aesthetically landscaped grounds near Virginia Water in Surrey, England, about 22 miles (35 km) south-west of Charing Cross. Its largest buildings, including one listed at Grade I, have been restored and supplemented as Virginia Park, a gated residential community featuring a spa complex, gymnasium, multi-purpose sports hall and an all-weather tennis court.

Construction was conceived by the wealthy philanthropist Thomas Holloway, which entailed an elaborate Franco-Gothic style by W. H. Crossland, and took place between 1873 and 1885. The imposing exteriors and interiors have a sister building, the Royal Holloway College about a mile north; Sir Nikolaus Pevsner regarded the two as the "summit of High Victorian design". In 1948 the site was transferred to the National Health Service. In the year 2000, after more than a decade of neglect, the buildings were restored and some of the grounds converted to houses which led to the site's renaming. Many of the original features have been preserved involving direction by English Heritage.

== History ==
=== The founder ===
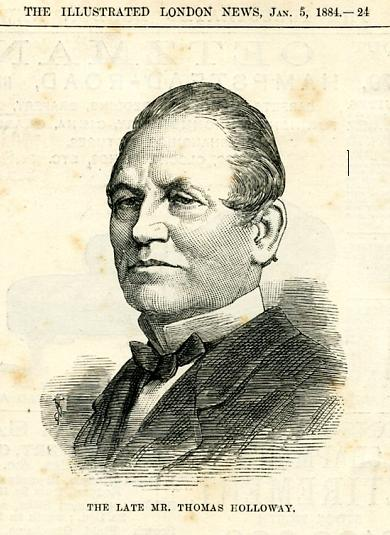
Contemporary wood-engraving from a photograph by Elliott & Fry

Thomas Holloway was a Victorian entrepreneur who made a fortune from the sale of his patent medicines, pills and ointments, designed to cure all ills.

Looking for ways in which to spend his fortune, Holloway turned to philanthropy, and became a champion of progressive mental health care. George III's madness had excited public opinion about the correct and humane treatment for the insane. Therefore, on 19 April 1861 Holloway attended a public meeting at the London Freemasons’ Hall in which Lord Shaftesbury, sincerely concerned with mental health, made a magnificent speech, calling for funds for the foundation of an asylum for the middle-class insane. Lord Shaftesbury appealed for £5,000 and received immediately contributions totaling £760, though none from Holloway. Holloway was impressed, and Shaftesbury received a letter from Holloway's solicitor three years later announcing "a gentleman who is possessed of nearly a quarter of a million" and wished to see him with a view to disposing of that sum "for charitable uses".

The meeting took place on 25 May 1864 at which Holloway resolved to spend some of his fortune on the establishment of a sanatorium for the mentally sick of the middle classes "the professional breadwinner whose income ceases when he is unable to work". Pauper asylums gave refuge for the insane of the poorer classes, and care at private establishments could be bought by the rich. Charity for the poor demeaned its recipients: as far as possible people should be assisted to help themselves. The proposed asylum was not intended for the permanently insane, but as a refuge in which the temporarily deranged should be assisted to resume their working lives. At that meeting Holloway told Shaftesbury that he intended to spend his fortune on a single building and in a single benefaction.

=== Outline design ===
In 1872 that Holloway met with the Commissioners in Lunacy, who entered warmly into his plans and promised every assistance to produce a model building. He expressed some quite fixed feelings about architecture but was no expert and was assisted by Professor T. L. Donaldson and T. H. Wyatt (who were architects for the Commissioners in Lunacy). Donaldson (1795–1885) was a foremost architect, the first Professor of Architecture at University College London, co-founder of the Royal Institute of British Architects (RIBA), and its president in 1863–4. Thomas Henry Wyatt (1807–1880) similarly, who had been President of RIBA in 1870. Both Donaldson and Wyatt received some recompense for their services, the former 100 guineas and the latter 25 guineas. Holloway had a third adviser, George Godwin, editor of The Builder. Holloway's initial idea was that the design of the building should be purely Italian, modelled on the river frontage of Somerset House. However, by October 1871 he had had a change of heart and wrote to Donaldson: “You will see that I have gone into the grand old Flemish style. I know that your taste is classical and which I greatly admire, but perhaps all things considered the Gothic would be most appropriate, as we can get red brick in the neighbourhood and a large building in the Italian style ought, I believe, to have stone facings”.

=== Design competition ===
The commissioners suggested that the best results would be obtained by submitting the plans to a competition of a limited number of architects. In September 1871 Holloway held the competition with the result that ten architects submitted eleven plans for the asylum. The architects who responded to the invitation to submit designs for the asylum were Crossland, Salomons & Jones; Alfred Smith; T. Roger Smith; Richard Phené Spiers; J. P. Seddon; J. S. Quilter; T. H. Watson; E. W. Godwin (two designs); F. & H. Francis and Thomas C. Hine. The winning entry, with a first premium award of £200, was by Crossland, Salomons and Jones. Alfred Smith was awarded the second premium of £100 and all the others received £50 for their trouble, except Hine, a Nottingham architect, who received only £25: possibly he had not actually been invited to submit a plan. The moneys were paid out in July 1872. In August 1872 the plans were placed on exhibition in the Regent Street gallery of E. Freeman.

=== Detailed design ===
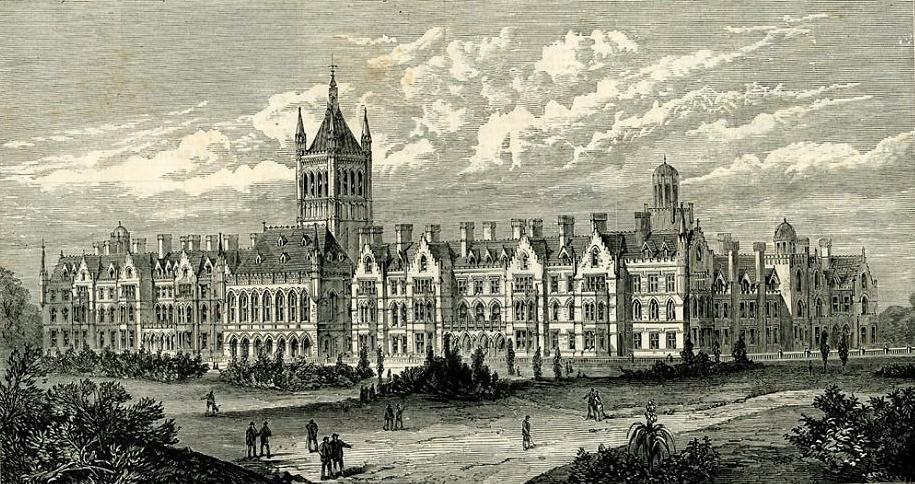
Wood-engraving from the Illustrated London News, 5 January 1884

William Henry Crossland later recalled that he had not wished to go into the competition on his own and had sought the assistance of distinguished Irish architect John Philpot Jones. Edward Salomons practised in Manchester where he and Jones had designed the Reform Club in 1870. It is possible that the two had met in Rochdale in 1866 when Crossland was engaged on the Town Hall and Salomons on the town's theatre. Crossland planned it to look like the Cloth Hall at Ypres (having tried this design the previous year in the building of Rochdale Town Hall) and the Great Hall was designed in the style of the gothic La Sainte-Chapelle in Paris. Jones, who had most of the work on the asylum design, died soon after the foundation stone was laid and Crossland records that most of the work then fell to him, Salomons being in Manchester. Crossland received commission of £7,620 – without travelling expenses for himself or his staff.

=== The site ===
In Victorian times many hospitals were built on spacious grounds in urban as well as rural locations, not only because more land was available, but also because space had therapeutic and practical value:

"An asylum should be placed on elevated ground and should command cheerful prospects, should be surrounded with land sufficient to afford outdoor employment for males, and exercise for all patients, and to protect them from being overlooked or disturbed by strangers."

This ideal of the Commissioners in Lunacy was quoted by an architecture researcher from York University, Robert Mayo, in a report for the Royal Institute of Chartered Surveyors.

A site was chosen, north of the nascent Virginia Water village, directly west of a drop to the Thames plain below on St. Ann's Heath, part of Holloway's land. Holloway ensured upper parts of the building were visible from a railway and a local road, the main route from Virginia Water railway station (in cutting) and Stroude Road behind high quality brick walls. Work on the building began in the Spring of 1873, when a clerk of works was appointed. Holloway's wife, Jane Holloway, laid the first brick. Crossland received an instalment of £300 on 2 March 1874. Once started, Holloway was determined that building should go forward apace. When his plan for the use of Portland stone in place of ornamental brickwork was not allowed to stand, Crossland had to set aside all his carefully planned working and detail drawings and hurriedly draw up alternatives for masons and master bricklayers.

=== Construction ===
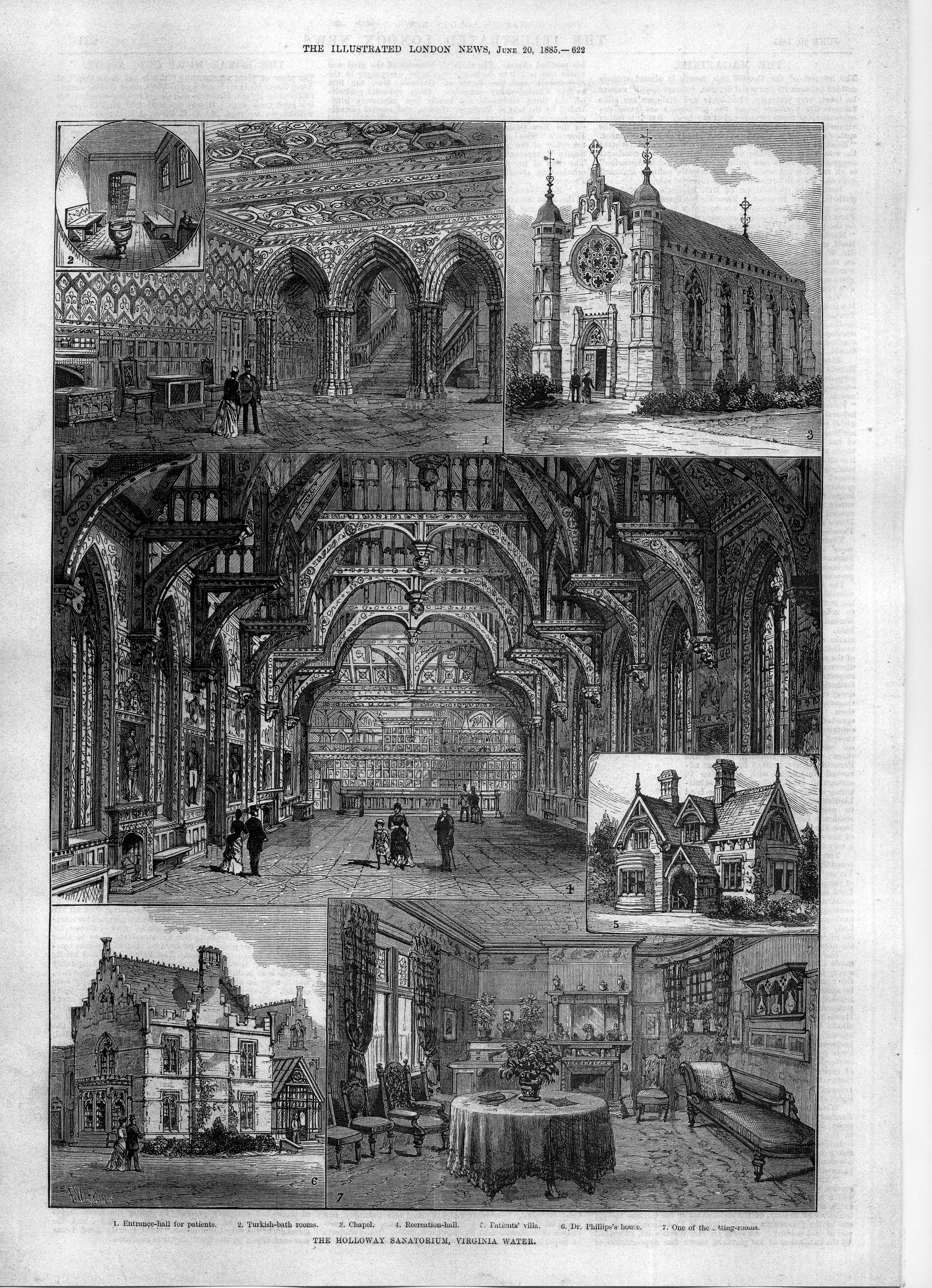
THE HOLLOWAY SANATORIUM, VIRGINIA WATER ... ... ... engravings from The Illustrated London News, June 20, 1885, 1. Entrance-hall for patients. 2. Turkish-bath rooms. 3. Chapel. 4. Recreation-hall. 5. Patients' villa. 6. Dr. Phillips' house. 7. One of the sitting-rooms.

The first clerk of works was J. P. Featherstone who had been a tenant farmer under Holloway: he was appointed in April 1873 and resigned on 24 December 1876. Among the contractors were: Sharpington & Cole, London (masons); W. H. Lascelles, Finsbury (joiner); George Burfoot, Windsor (paving); Pontifex & Wood, London (lead); Wilson W. Phipson (heating); J. Gibson, Battersea (landscaping); J. D. Richards, London (furnishings). Ancillary works included the gas works at a cost of £1,950, six cottages and a workshop, and the sewage works which were constructed by John Thompson of Peterborough at a cost of £1,500.

A large workforce was employed during the twelve years. The building accounts include costs of advertising for masons, not only locally in Surrey and Berkshire, but from as far as Birmingham and Manchester. Holloway worked supervising the project closely until prevented by illness: unfortunately he died on Boxing Day 1883, eighteen months before the sanatorium was opened.

By the time the institution was ready to admit patients, new regulations had come into force, and Crossland had to revise the internal arrangements to comply with the new safety regulations. Interior decoration was lavish: the great recreation hall with a grand beamed roof was decorated by the Scottish architect and designer John Moyr Smith at a cost of £400.

The sanatorium was officially opened by the Prince and Princess of Wales (later King Edward VII and Queen Alexandra) on 12 June 1885. Mr. Martin-Holloway, who delivered the opening address, was Thomas Holloway's brother-in-law George Martin (1833–1895), who had married Sarah Anne Driver the sister of Jane Holloway. George and his brother Henry assisted Thomas Holloway in the foundation of the Sanatorium and Royal Holloway College. After Thomas Holloway died George assumed the additional name of Holloway, and was knighted in 1887.

=== Early operation of the hospital ===
The first medical superintendent was Dr. Sutherland Rees Phillips. In the early years of the sanatorium, nurses and domestic staff lived on the premises. There were 73 certified patients admitted in 1885, the first year. The 1891 census shows that Dr. Phillips was superintendent, listing 314 patients (including boarders) and 147 resident staff (medical, attendants and domestic). In 1901 the superintendent was Dr. William David Meares, and there were 384 patients and 210 resident staff. In 1911 the numbers were 368 inmates and 227 resident staff, with chief medical officer Dr. Thomas E. Harper and steward Jacob Jarvis Robertson.

Holloway was known for its "innovative therapies" such as massage and gym exercise. Dr Elizabeth Casson an early proponent of occupational therapy was Medical Officer at the Holloway Sanatorium from 1921 to 1929. However, controversial restraint methods were also employed such as the “dry-pack”, with one patient, Thomas Weir, who died while confined at the end of the nineteenth century.

=== Post war history ===
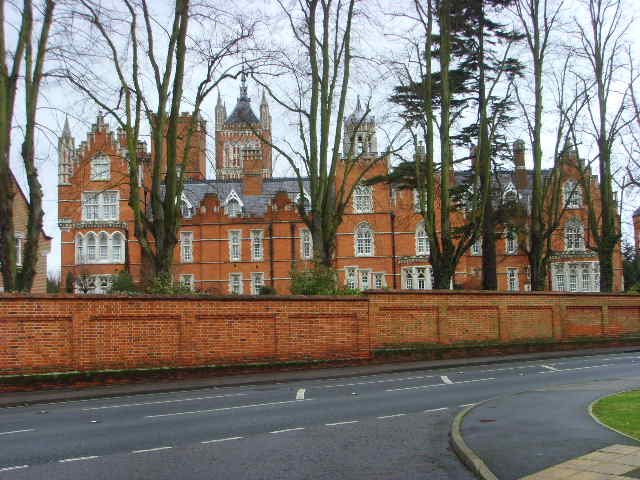
Holloway Sanatorium in 2008

Lyne Place, an imposing Regency house with gardens two miles (3 km) south at Wentworth Park which had been the home of Russian philosopher P. D. Ouspensky between 1930 and his death in 1947, was acquired by the Sanatorium to accommodate staff and patients in 1950.

The management of the sanatorium passed to the NHS on 5 July 1948 which continued its hospital use with a catchment area including Weybridge, Walton, Chertsey, Egham and Virginia Water. Until 1974 private patients continued to be admitted into a limited number of "amenity beds", paying for the relatively aesthetic surroundings, but receiving standard NHS treatment. In 1968 it became administratively part of St Peter's Hospital in Chertsey.

The travel writer Bill Bryson recorded that the sanatorium had a charm about it because "it was full of wandering lunatics". Bryson worked at the sanatorium in 1973 as a nurse on Tuke Ward. His Notes From A Small Island mentions the ward as home to "long-stay male patients in a state of arrested insanity". According to Bryson, the place was one of the most extraordinary communities in England. Many patients were allowed to wander freely down to the shops and back, mingling on equal terms with the locals, who affectionately referred to the institution as "the sanny".

On 8 February 1978 a disastrous fire broke out on the stage of the cinema which spread rapidly, fanned by a strong easterly wind. The patients were calmly escorted from the building and there was only one minor injury. The cinema and three wards, 'Clouston', 'Jane Holloway' and 'Thomas Holloway', were gutted and the electro-convulsive therapy and sewing rooms were badly damaged.

The sanatorium was closed in December 1980 and the remaining patients transferred to Ashford Hospital, which maintained a psycho-geriatric unit (Holloway Unit). On 21 July 1981 contents of "Holloway Sanatorium: antique and period furniture" were sold at Wentworth Auction Galleries.

In 1994, under the guidance of English Heritage, a plan by Octagon to salvage the Grade I building (at the highest category in architecture) was accepted. Octagon spent six years in a punctilious art restoration and conversion project. Craftspeople in various disciplines returned the buildings to very near to the original. The Grand Hall was restored and the main building converted into 23 three- and four-storey town houses. The site became Virginia Park, a gated and walled community of 190 houses and apartments. The former chapel building is separately listed as a Grade II* building.

== In popular culture ==
The facility featured in music videos in the early 1980s, such as Bucks Fizz, Adam Ant, The Cure, "Total Eclipse of the Heart" by Bonnie Tyler, "Pearly-Dewdrops' Drops" by Cocteau Twins, and "Forever Young" by Alphaville. The buildings were used to film the 1982 prison film, Scrubbers, starring Miriam Margolyes and Kathy Burke. The main building was used in some early episodes of Inspector Morse, including the very first episode, The Dead of Jericho. Inspector Morse is seen on the main staircase, and the Dining Hall is used in the opening scenes. The 1986 slasher film Slaughter High used the site for many scenes. The Main Hall (Recreation Hall) was used in the Michael Caine TV film /mini Series Jack the Ripper when Chief Inspector Frederick Abberline questions the beggars.

== Sources ==
- Hodder, Edwin (1887). The Life and Work of the Seventh Earl of Shaftesbury, K.G. Cassell & company.
- Shapely, Peter (2007). Medicine, Charity and Mutual Aid: The Consumption of Health and Welfare in Britain, c.1550–1950. Routledge. ISBN 978-0754651482.
