= Jane Holloway =

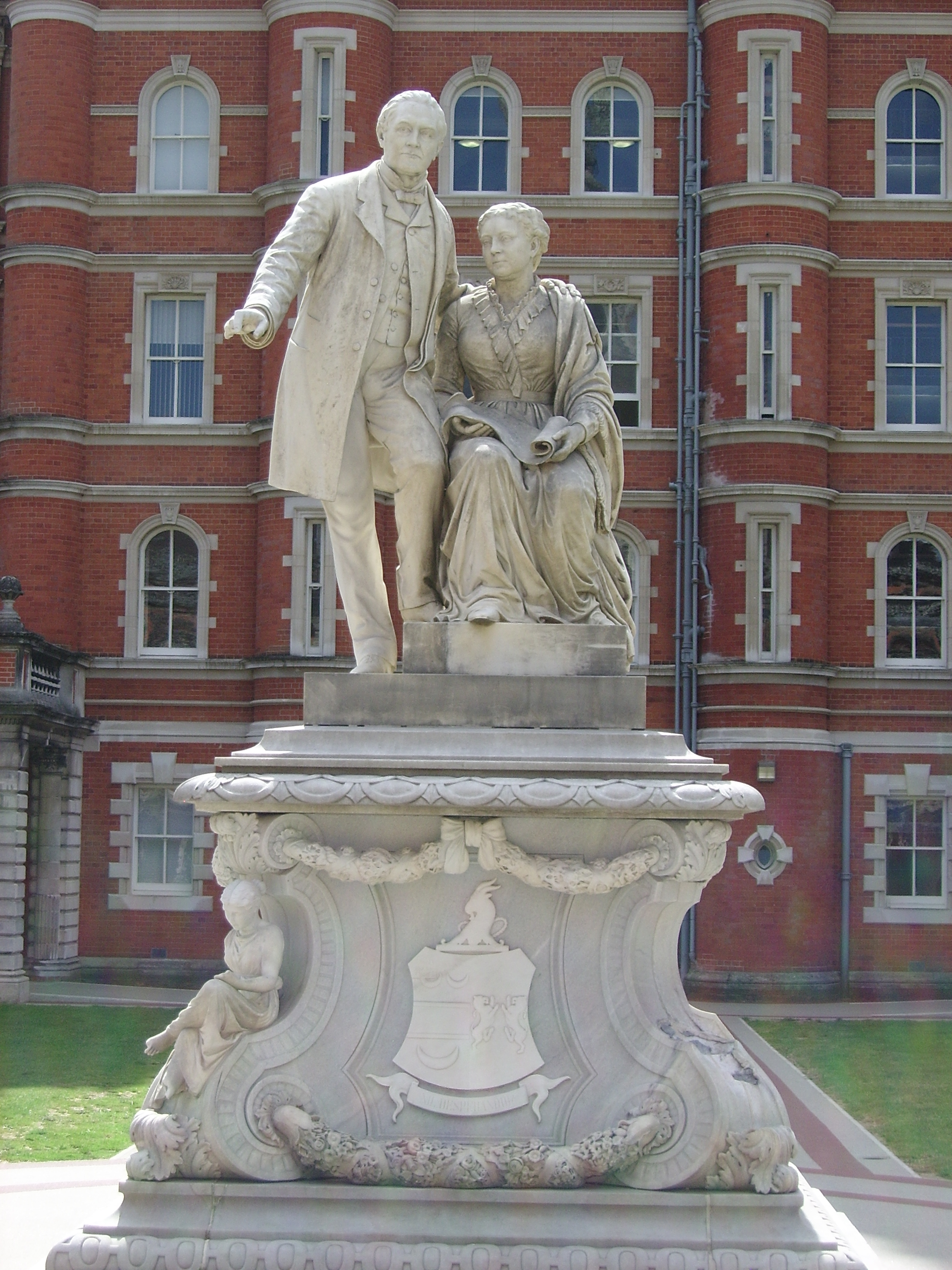
Figure 1: Statue of Thomas and Jane Holloway in South Quad at Royal Holloway

Jane Holloway née Driver (1 November 1814 – 26 September 1875) was the inspiration for founding a women's college at Royal Holloway. Following her death, both Holloway Sanatorium and Royal Holloway were founded in her memory by her husband, Thomas Holloway.

== Life and business ==
Jane Pearce Driver was born in 1814. Her father was a shipwright from Rotherhithe.

In 1840, Jane married Thomas Holloway, after a period of courting where he nicknamed her "Grace Darling" after the famous Victorian heroine. Jane took an active role in Holloway's business and is reported to have worked on the production line at The Strand during the early years. Other members of her family soon also became involved in the promotion of Holloway's products, likely through Jane's influence. Thomas Holloway's business was mainly occupied in the manufacturer of pills and ointments. For many years, they lived above their business premises at 244, The Strand. When the building was demolished in 1867, they moved to 533, New Oxford Street (subsequently renumbered as 78). They eventually left London and settled at Tittenhurst Park, Sunninghill. In later years, Jane accompanied Thomas on business trips abroad to promote the products.

== Death ==
Jane died in 1875 at the age of 61, eight years before Thomas. She is buried alongside her husband in a family grave at Sunninghill churchyard.

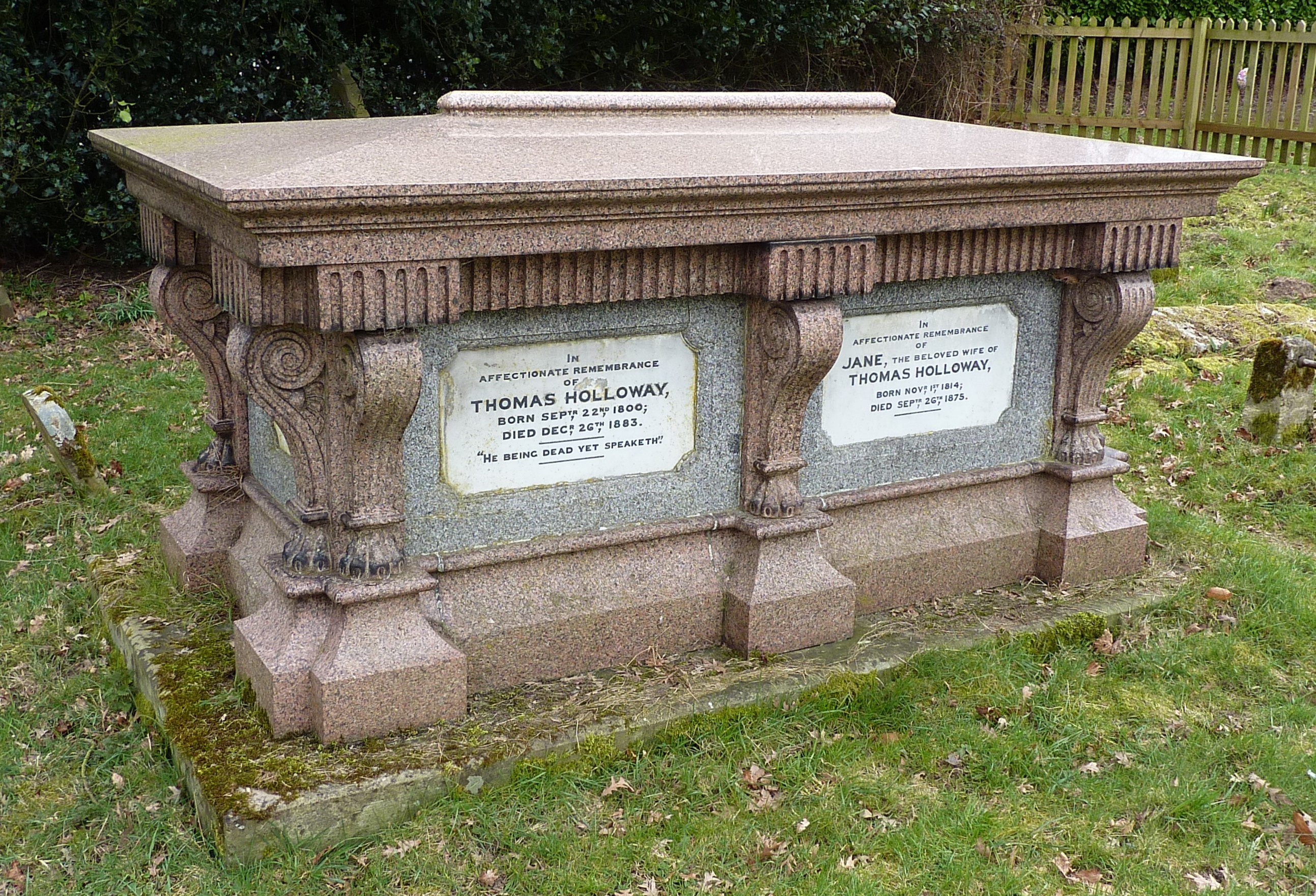
Figure 2: Grave of Jane and Thomas Holloway at St. Michael and All Angels Church, Sunninghill

== Philanthropic legacy ==
Jane placed the first brick at Holloway Sanatorium, followed by her husband Thomas. He went on to complete the Sanatorium after death. Jane was, according to Thomas, the inspiration behind the foundation of Royal Holloway. Jane encouraged Holloway to do something for women 'because they are the greatest sufferers'. The Foundation Deed of Holloway College states that "the college is founded by the advice and counsel of the Founder's dear wife... to afford the best education for women of the Upper and Upper Middle Classes." After her death, the college was founded by Thomas Holloway in her memory in 1879. Following the death of Thomas, the college was eventually opened in 1886 by Queen Victoria in the presence of Jane's brother-in-law, George Martin.

=== Commemoration ===
Jane Holloway's married initials (JH) feature in the ceiling design of Holloway Sanatorium alongside those of her husband. Jane Holloway is commemorated on the Royal Holloway campus with a statue. She is represented reviewing the plans set forth by her husband
