= Thomas Holloway =

19th-century British philanthropist

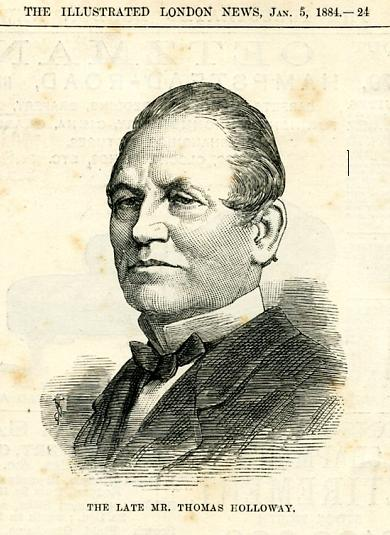
Contemporary wood-engraving from a photograph by Elliott & Fry

Thomas Holloway (22 September 1800 – 26 December 1883) was an English businessman and philanthropist.

== Early life ==
Holloway was born in Devonport, Plymouth, Devon, the eldest son of Thomas and Mary Holloway (née Chellew), who at the time of their son's birth had a bakery business. They later moved to Penzance, Cornwall, where they ran The Turk's Head Inn. In the late 1820s, Holloway went to live in Roubaix, France, for a few years. He returned to England in 1831 and worked in London as a secretary and interpreter for a firm of importers and exporters. In 1836, he set himself up as a foreign and commercial agent in London.

== Business career ==
Holloway had business connections with an Italian, Felix Albinolo, who manufactured and sold a general purpose ointment. This gave Holloway the idea to set up a similar business himself in 1837. He began by using his mother's pots and pans to manufacture his ointment in the family kitchen. Seeing the potential in patent medicines, Holloway soon added pills to his range of products. Holloway's business was extremely successful. A key factor in his enormous success in business was advertising, in which Holloway had great faith. Holloway's first newspaper announcements appeared in 1837, and by 1842 his yearly expenses for publicity had reached over £5,000 (GBP). By the time of his death, he was spending over £50,000 a year on advertising his products. The sales of his products made Holloway a multi-millionaire, and one of the richest men in Britain at the time. Holloway's products were said to be able to cure a whole host of ailments, though scientific evaluation of them after his death showed that few of them contained any ingredients which would be considered to be of significant medicinal value. Holloway's medicine business slowly declined and was bought by rival Beecham's Pills in 1930.

== Philanthropy ==
Holloway is remembered for the two large institutions which he built in England: Holloway Sanatorium in Virginia Water, Surrey, and Royal Holloway College, a college of the University of London in Englefield Green, Surrey. Both were designed by the architect William Henry Crossland, and were inspired by the Cloth Hall in Ypres, Belgium, and the Château de Chambord in the Loire Valley, France. They were founded by Holloway as "Gifts to the nation".

Holloway claimed that it was his wife, Jane Holloway, who inspired him to found the college, which was a women-only college and did not accept male undergraduates until 1965, although postgraduates were accepted in 1945. Holloway also paid over £80,000 to acquire 77 Victorian era paintings which he donated to the college at the time of its founding. Most of these pieces of art still belong to the college, and remain on display today in the college's Picture Gallery. Three of the paintings, by Turner, Constable and Gainsborough were sold in the 1990s.

== Tittenhurst Park ==
Holloway had become extremely wealthy by the late 1860s and bought a Georgian House at Sunninghill, near Ascot, Berkshire called Tittenhurst Park. Holloway lived there with his wife, Jane. Her sister, Sarah Anne Driver, also lived there with her husband George Martin, as did Holloway's sister Matilda, an invalid who died soon after. Jane died in 1875, aged 61; Holloway died there on 26 December 1883, aged 83.

A century later, from 1969 to 1971, the building became the home of John Lennon with his then new wife Yoko Ono, having been married on 20 March 1969 in Gibraltar. Another member of the Beatles, Ringo Starr, lived there after Lennon until the late-1980s. In 1988, the property was sold to Sheikh Zayed bin Sultan Al Nahyan, President of the United Arab Emirates and ruler of Abu Dhabi. Since then major renovation of the manor has been carried out, and the interior no longer resembles the house lived in by Lennon and Starr.

== Death ==
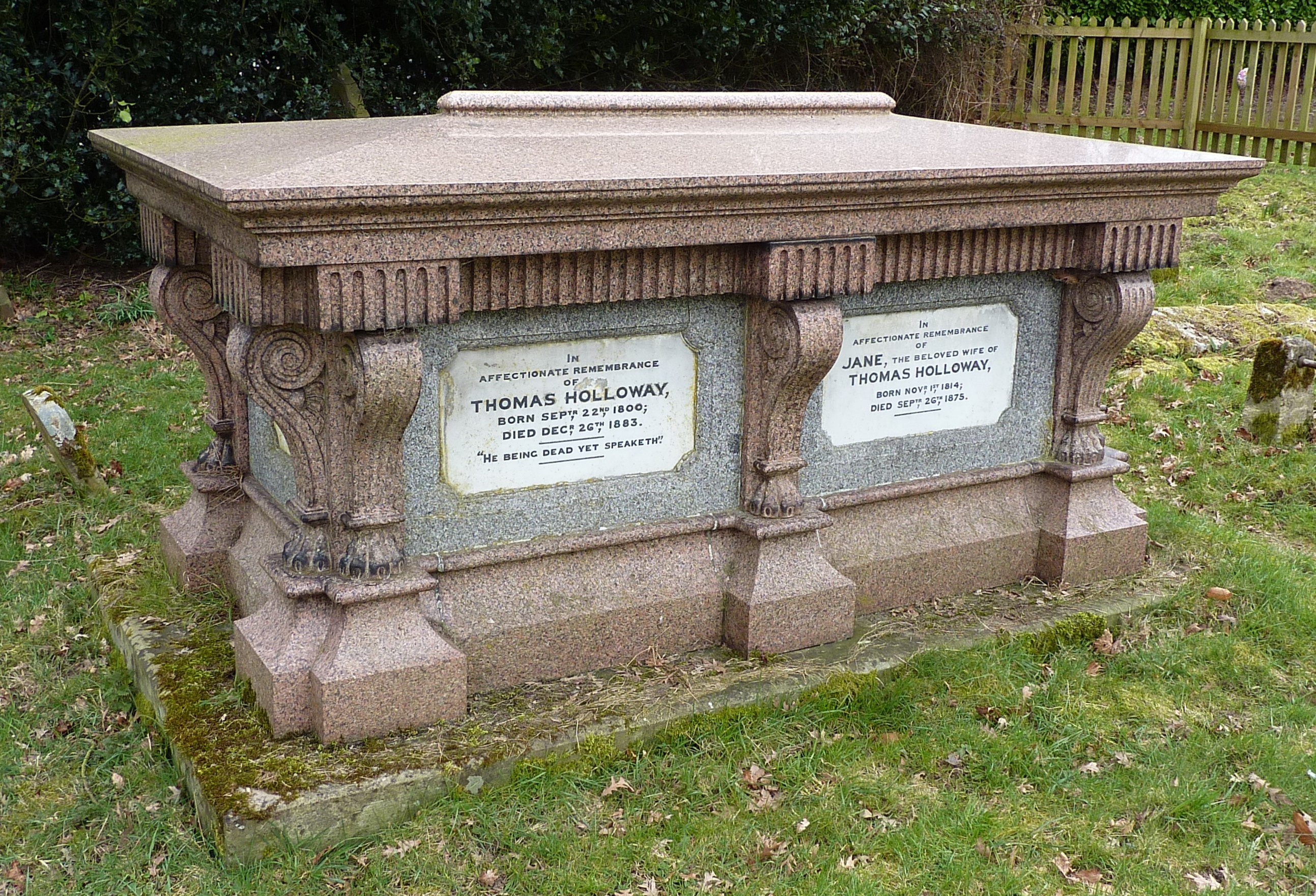
Thomas Holloway's grave at St. Michael and All Angels Church, Sunninghill, Berkshire.

A philanthropic and somewhat eccentric donor (he had an unconcealed prejudice against doctors, lawyers and parsons), Holloway died of congestion of the lungs at Sunninghill in 1883, eighteen months before the opening of the Holloway Sanatorium. He is buried with his wife Jane in a family grave at Sunninghill churchyard. A display about his life was unveiled at the church in October 2014 by Royal Holloway's Principal, Professor Paul Layzell.

== Bibliography ==
- Bradley, Ian Campbell. Enlightened Entrepreneurs. Weidenfeld & Nicolson, 1987. ISBN 0-297-79054-4
- Harrison-Barbet, Anthony. Thomas Holloway: Victorian Philanthropist. Royal Holloway University of London, 1994 (2nd ed.) ISBN 0-900-14589-7

== Sources ==
- Anderson, Stuart, "From pills to philanthropy: the Thomas Holloway story", Pharmaceutical Historian. 35(2): 32-6, June 2005
