= List of principals of Royal Holloway, University of London =

The following is a list of principals of Royal Holloway, University of London, including its predecessor institutions, Royal Holloway College and Bedford College, London.

== List of principals ==
=== Principals of Royal Holloway College ===
- Matilda Ellen Bishop (1887–1897)
- Emily Penrose (1898–1907)
- Ellen Charlotte Higgins (1907–1935)
- Janet Ruth Bacon (1935–1944)
- Fanny Street, acting principal (1944–1945)
- Edith Clara Batho (1945–1962)
- Marjorie Williamson (1962–1973)
- Lionel Harry Butler (1973–1981)
- Roy Miller (1982–1985)

=== Principals of Bedford College ===
- Emily Penrose (1893–1898)
- Ethel Hurlbatt (1898–1906)
- Margaret Tuke (1907–1929)
- Geraldine Emma May Jebb (1930–1951)
- Norah Lillian Penston (1951–1964)
- Elizabeth Millicent Chilver (1964–1971)
- John Nicholson Black (1971–1981)
- Dorothy Wedderburn (1981–1985)

=== Principals of Royal Holloway and Bedford New College ===
- Dorothy Wedderburn (1985–1990)
- Norman Gowar (1990–2000)
- Drummond Bone (2000–2002)
- Stephen Hill (2002–2009)
- Paul Layzell (2010–2022)
- Julie Sanders (2022–present)

== See also ==
- List of Royal Holloway, University of London people
