= List of people associated with Royal Holloway, University of London =

The following is a list of Royal Holloway, University of London people, including alumni, members of faculty and fellows.

== Notable alumni ==
Royal Holloway College, Bedford College and RHUL have over 80,000 alumni.

=== Entertainment, media, theatre ===
- Chris Aldridge, British radio newsreader (BBC Radio 4)
- David Benson (born 1962), English comedian, writer and actor
- Peter Bramley, British actor, director and theatre director
- Mark Carwardine, Zoologist, Writer, wildlife photographer, TV and radio presenter
- Candace Chong Mui Ngam (born 1976), Hong Kong playwright
- Richard Clarke (born 1978), English radio presenter
- James Dagwell (born 1974), British journalist
- Isabel Fay (born 1979), English comedy writer and character comedian
- Agnes Mary Field (1896–1968), film producer
- Emma Freud (born 1962), English broadcaster and cultural commentator
- Pippa Guard (born 1952), English actress
- Janice Hadlow, controller of BBC Two
- Lenny Henry (born 1958), comedian and presenter
- Alex Hyndman (born 1978), British newsreader
- Robin Ince (born 1969), English comedian
- Anthony Jabre, film producer and financier
- Karena Johnson, English theatre director
- Roxanne McKee (born 1980), British actress and model
- John Moloney, comedian and comedy writer
- Mary Nightingale (born 1964), British newsreader
- Jeremy Northam (born 1961), actor
- Simon Nye (born 1958), English comic television writer
- Lucy Owen (born 1970), Welsh newsreader
- Ben Richardson (b.198?), British cinematographer
- Bobby Seagull (born 1984), mathematics teacher and broadcaster
- Mark Strong (born 1963), English actor
- Daniel Lawrence Taylor (born 198?), British actor and comedy writer
- Francis Wheen (born 1957), British journalist, writer and broadcaster
- Sir Roger Wright (born 1956) Controller of BBC Radio 3 and former director of the BBC Proms

=== Literature ===
- Tahmima Anam (born 1975), Bangladeshi-born writer and novelist
- Margaret Busby (born 1944), writer and broadcaster
- Ivy Compton-Burnett (1884–1969), English novelist
- Richmal Crompton (1890–1969), English writer of Just William
- George Eliot (1819–1880), British novelist
- Jane Gardam (born 1928), novelist
- Rosemary Manning (1911–1988), British author
- Gerda Mayer (1927–2021), English poet
- Jojo Moyes (born 1969), British novelist
- Redell Olsen (born 1971), poet, performer and academic
- Sophie Robinson, (born 1985) contemporary English poet
- Ann Saddlemyer (born 1932), Canadian academic and author
- Miranda Seymour (born 1948), Biographer, novelist
- Jacqueline Simpson (born 1930), British author and folklorist
- Dame Freya Stark (1893–1993), explorer and travel writer
- Charles Tomlinson (1927–2015), poet and academic
- Carol Townend (born 1953) English author

=== Music ===
- Richard Baker (born 1972), British composer and conductor
- Susan Bullock (born 1958), English soprano
- Jonathan Cole (born 1970), British composer
- Tansy Davies (born 1973), British composer
- Example (born 1982), British singer, rapper and songwriter
- Sarah Fox (born 1973) English operatic soprano
- Geoff Hannan (born 1972), British composer
- Dame Felicity Lott (born 1947), English soprano
- Ivan Moody (born 1964), British composer
- Karen Mok (born 1970), Hong Kong singer
- Paul Newland (born 1966), British composer
- Ewan Pearson (born 1972), British music producer
- Andrew Poppy (born 1954), British composer, pianist and music producer
- China Soul (born 1988) American-British singer/songwriter
- Joby Talbot (born 1971) British composer
- KT Tunstall (born 1975) Scottish singer and songwriter
- John Scott Whiteley (born 1950) York Minster organist and composer

=== Politics ===
- Abbas Ahmad Akhoundi (born 1957), Iranian politician
- Catherine Ashton (born 1956), British Labour politician; High Representative of the EU for Foreign Affairs and Security Policy; vice president, European Commission
- Norman Baker (born 1957) Liberal Democrat MP for Lewes 1997–2015
- Greg Barker (born 1966), British politician
- Helen Bentwich (1892–1972), philanthropist and politician
- Emily Davison (1872–1913), English suffragette activist
- Evelyn Denington, Baroness Denington (1907–1998), politician
- Dame Janet Fookes (born 1936) English politician, Conservative member House of Lords
- Norvela Forster (1931–1993) British businesswoman, exporter and politician (MEP)
- John Gardiner, Baron Gardiner of Kimble, (born 1956), politician
- Sir Robbie Gibb (born 1964), political advisor and journalist
- Anna Healy, Baroness Healy of Primrose Hill (born 1955), politician
- Jean Henderson (1899–1997), British barrister and Liberal Party politician
- Ruth Henig, Baroness Henig (born 1943), politician and historian
- Moussa Ibrahim (born 1974), Gaddafi spokesman during the 2011 Libyan civil war
- Stewart Jackson (born 1965), British politician
- Tess Kingham (born 1963), British politician
- Jessica Lee (born 1976), British politician
- Jean McFarlane, Baroness McFarlane of Llandaff (1926–2012), nurse and member of the House of Lords
- Delyth Morgan, Baroness Morgan of Drefelin (born 1961), politician
- Sir Andrew Parmley (born 1956), former Lord Mayor of London
- Al Pinkerton, Liberal Democrat politician
- Victoria Prentis (born 1971), Conservative MP and former Attorney General for England and Wales
- Jenny Randerson (born 1948), Welsh Liberal Democrat politician
- Andrew Stephenson (born 1981), British politician
- Frances Stevenson (1888–1972), personal secretary and second wife of David Lloyd George
- Mary Stewart, Baroness Stewart of Alvechurch (1903–1984), politician
- Valerie Vaz (born 1954), British politician
- Katharine Wallas (1864–1944), politician
- Diana Warwick, Baroness Warwick of Undercliffe (born 1945) Labour member House of Lords

=== Science ===
- Melanie Bartley, sociologist
- David Bellamy (1933–2019) Botanist, environmentalist, author and broadcaster
- Martin Buck (born 1956) microbiologist
- Ida Busbridge (1908–1988) first woman to be appointed to an Oxford fellowship in mathematics
- Dame Harriette Chick (1875–1977), microbiologist
- John B. Cosgrave (born 1946), Irish mathematician
- Stuart Cull-Candy (born 1946), neuroscientist
- Jean Hanson (1919–1973), biophysicist
- Jackie Hunter (born 1956), former chief executive of BBSRC
- Dame Kathleen Lonsdale (1903–1971), crystallographer
- Dame Sally Macintyre (born 1949), medical sociologist
- Rachel, Lady MacRobert (1884–1954), geologist
- K. C. Nicolaou (born 1946), chemist
- Mary Pickford (1902–2002), British neuroendocrinologist
- Rosalind Pitt-Rivers (1907–1990) biochemist
- Helen Porter (1899–1987) botanist, first female professor of Imperial College London
- Dame Miriam Rothschild (1908–2005), natural scientist
- Eva Germaine Rimington Taylor (1871–1966), English geographer, historian of science
- Jennifer Anne Thomas, experimental particle physicist
- Derek Yalden (1940–2013) English zoologist, reader at the University of Manchester
- Grace Waterhouse (1906–1996), British mycologist
- Dame Olive Wheeler (1886–1963), educationist and psychologist
- Alex Wilkie (born 1948), mathematician
- Fiona Williams (born 1947), social scientist
- Andy Young (born 1950), psychologist

=== Sport ===
- Theo Brophy-Clews (born 1997) English rugby player
- Sophie Christiansen (born 1987), gold medal winner, Paralympics equestrian events
- Jessica Eddie (born 1984), British rower, Olympic silver medalist
- Helene Raynsford (born 1979), British paralympic rower and gold medallist
- Zeina Shaban (born 1988), Jordanian table tennis player and a member of the Jordanian royal family
- Andy Sheridan, (born 1979) Rugby Union, Sale Sharks and England
- Joe Saward (born 1961), British Formula One journalist
- Alex Lewington (born 1991) English rugby player

=== Other ===
- Kitty Anderson (1903–79) BA PhD, former Headmistress of North London Collegiate School
- Muhammad Abdul Bari (b.1953), Former Secretary General Muslim Council of Britain
- Daphne Blundell (1916–2004), former Director of Women's Royal Naval Service
- John Broome (born 1947), philosopher
- Sophie Bryant (1850–1922) Anglo-Irish mathematician, educator, feminist and activist
- Helen Cam (1885–1968), English historian
- Lucy Caslon, founder and director of charity Msizi Africa
- Ilse Crawford (born 1962), British designer
- Dame Karen Dunnell (born 1946), medical sociologist
- Edith Durham (1863–1944), British traveller, artist, writer and anthropologist
- Dame Ann Ebsworth (1937–2002), high court judge
- Tania El Khoury (born 1976), Lebanese artist
- Dame Janet Finch (born 1946) former Vice-chancellor, Professor of Social Relations at Keele University 1995–2010, honorary fellow RHC 1999
- Jayne-Anne Gadhia (born 1961), Chief Executive Officer of Virgin Money UK
- Robert Garside (born 1967), English record-breaking adventurer
- Jonathan Goodall, (born 1961), bishop
- Laura Gowing, historian
- Nick Hallard (born 1975), British artist
- Giles Hart (1949–2005), British engineer and trade union activist
- Alison Jaggar (born 1941), philosopher
- Admiral Sir Ben Key (born 1965), First Sea Lord
- Declan Lang (born 1950), bishop
- Duncan McCargo, professor and director of the Nordic Institute of Asian Studies
- Louisa Martindale (1872–1966), British physician and surgeon
- Angela Mason (born 1944), civil servant and activist
- Marilynne Morgan, barrister and civil servant
- Victor Olisa, former senior Metropolitan Police officer
- Jennie Page (b. 1944), former chief executive of the London Millennium Dome project
- Thea Porter (1927–2000), fashion designer (expelled)
- Sarah Parker Remond (1815-c.1894) African-American lecturer, abolitionist and doctor
- Dame Mildred Riddelsdell (1913–2006), civil servant
- Christian Saunders, United Nations official
- Alison Shrubsole (1925–2002), former Principal of Homerton College, Cambridge
- Dame Mary Smieton (1902–2005), civil servant, second woman to reach rank of permanent secretary
- Simon Thurley (born 1963), British architectural historian
- Sarah Tyacke (born 1945), historian and archivist
- Amanda Vickery professor of early modern history at Queen Mary, University of London
- Ronald Alan Waldron (born 1927), English medievalist
- Mary Wilkinson (1909–2001), scholar of German literature and culture
- Ahmed Yerima, Nigerian professor, administrator

== Notable staff ==
The following is a list of notable office-holders, academics and other teachers or researchers:

- H. B. Acton, taught political philosophy
- Philip Allen, Baron Allen of Abbeydale, Member college council at the merger with Bedford
- Khizar Humayun Ansari, director of the Centre for Ethnic Minority Studies
- Sarah Ansari, professor of history
- Geoffrey Alderman, professor of politics and contemporary history
- Giovanni Aquilecchia, professor of Italian and Italian Renaissance scholar
- Gillian Bailey, fellow in theatre studies
- George Barger, professor of chemistry
- Dame Gillian Beer, former President of Clare Hall, Cambridge
- Sir William Benham, zoologist
- Margaret Jane Benson, Professor of Botany
- John Bercow, Professor of Politics, former Speaker of the House of Commons
- Francis Berry, professor of English literature
- Luiza Bialasiewicz, senior lecturer in human geography
- James Booth, mathematician
- Mark Bowden, professor of composition
- Andrew Bowie, professor of philosophy and German
- Mary Boyce, taught Anglo-Saxon literature and archaeology
- David Bradby, professor of drama and theatre studies
- Daniel Joseph Bradley, physicist
- Peter Bramley professor of biochemistry
- Kai Brodersen, visiting professor in ancient history and classics
- Jonathan Burrows, visiting professor of drama and theatre
- Hugh Longbourne Callendar, Fellow of the Royal Society
- Chris Carey, professor of classics
- William Benjamin Carpenter, Fellow of the Royal Society
- Lorna Casselton, fungal geneticist
- Philip Cashian, composer, taught in the music department
- David Cesarani, Research Professor in History
- William Gilbert Chaloner, Fellow of the Royal Society
- Justin Champion, professor of the history of early modern ideas
- Alexey Chervonenkis, professor of computer science
- Christopher Cocksworth, college chaplain, now Bishop of Coventry
- Paul Cohn, Fellow of the Royal Society
- Grenville Cole, Fellow of the Royal Society
- Peter Conrad, visiting professor in sociology
- Nicholas Cook, professorial research fellow in music
- Glen Cowan, professor of physics
- Denis Cosgrove, professor of geography and dean of the graduate school
- Joseph Mordaunt Crook, historian
- Tim Cresswell, professor of human geography
- Hilda Ellis Davidson, lecturer in archaeology and anthropology
- Veronica Della Dora, professor of human geography
- Antonella De Santo, lecturer in experimental physics, coordinator for the ATLAS experiment-UK supersymmetry group
- Whitfield Diffie, visiting professor at the Information Security Group
- Richard Dixon, Fellow of the Royal Society, biologist
- Roland Dobbs, emeritus professor of physics
- Klaus Dodds, professor of geopolitics
- Felix Driver, professor of human geography
- Michael Eysenck, (now emeritus) professor of psychology
- Lilian Faithfull, university administrator
- Giles Foden, fellow in creative and performing arts
- Sir Gregory Foster, former vice-chancellor of the University of London
- Mary Fowler, professor of geology, now Master of Darwin College, Cambridge
- Harold Munro Fox, Fellow of the Royal Society
- Dame Jane Francis, director of the British Antarctic Survey
- Dame Helen Gardner, assistant lecturer in English literature
- Reginald Gates, Fellow of the Royal Society
- A. C. Grayling, Master of New College of the Humanities
- Dame Helen Gwynne-Vaughan (1879–1967), botanist and mycologist
- Edith Hall, professor of classics and drama
- Robert Gavin Hampson, professor of modern literature
- Glyn Harman, professor of mathematics
- Nick Hardwick, former HM Chief Inspector of Prisons
- J. P. E. Harper-Scott, professor of music history and theory
- Leonard Hawkes, Fellow of the Royal Society
- Harriet Hawkins, professor of geography
- Margaret Hayes-Robinson, Head of History
- John F Healy, professor of classics and archaeology
- Sir Frank Heath, educationist and civil servant
- Olaus Henrici, Fellow of the Royal Society
- Frank Horton, professor of physics and vice-chancellor of London University 1939–45
- Dame Olwen Hufton, professorial research fellow in the history department
- Jonathan Holmes, senior lecturer in drama
- Joan M. Hussey, professor of history
- Julian Johnson, Regius Professor of Music
- Brian Juden, professor of French 1970–1985
- Sharman Kadish, scholar of Jewish British history
- Peter Knight, Jubilee research fellow in quantum optics
- Robert Latham, historian, dean of men, joint author 1970–83 The Diary of Samuel Pepys
- Robert Lethbridge chair French, head of dept, dean of the graduate school, vice-principal
- Roger Lockyer, reader in history, specialist in Tudor and Stuart Britain
- Sir Oliver Lodge, Fellow of the Royal Society
- S L Loney, professor of mathematics
- Peter Longerich, director of the research centre for the Holocaust and 20th century history
- John Duncan Mackie, historian
- Louis MacNeice, poet and playwright
- J. D. Mackie, professor of modern history
- Ursula Martin, taught in the computer science department
- Sir William McCrea, professor of mathematics 1944–66
- Oliver McGregor, Baron McGregor of Durris, sociologist
- Katie Mitchell, professor of Theatre Directing. Former associate director of the National Theatre, Royal Court Theatre and Royal Shakespeare Company.
- Sir Andrew Motion, Poet Laureate, professor of creative writing
- Sean Murphy, professor of cryptology
- David Naccache, visiting professor at the information security group
- Anthony J. Naldrett, visiting professor of geology
- Meredith Oakes, taught play-writing
- Ben O'Loughlin, prof. of international relations, co-director, New Political Communication Unit
- Sir Roger Penrose, recipient of the 2020 Nobel prize in physics
- Dame Lillian Penson, professor of modern history; first woman vice-chancellor of London University
- Fred Piper, professor and founder of the Information Security Group
- Kevin Porée record producer, songwriter, composer, arranger, lecturer theatre studies
- H. F. M. Prescott, Jubilee research fellow on Thomas Wolsey
- Boris Rankov, professor of Roman history
- Dan Rebellato, professor of contemporary theatre
- Jonathan Riley-Smith, taught in the history department
- Adam Roberts, teacher of literature and creative writing
- Eric Robertson, professor of modern French literary and visual culture
- Francis Robinson, professor of the history of South Asia
- Matt Robshaw, lecturer in cryptology
- Francis Rose, botanist
- Conrad Russell, 5th Earl Russell (1937–2004), reader in history
- William James Russell, Fellow of the Royal Society
- Nigel Saul, professor of medieval history
- Andrew Cunningham Scott, emeritus professor of geology, director science communications (1996–2007)
- Andrew Sentance, visiting professor, economist
- Jo Shapcott, poet and lecturer in creative writing
- Pankaj Sharma, Professor of Clinical Neurology
- Dame Barbara Shenfield, social scientist and politician
- David Skinner, taught in the music department
- Ray Solomonoff, visiting professor at the Computer Research Learning Centre
- Oskar Spate, lecturer in geography
- Sonya Stephens, former President of Mount Holyoke College
- Anthony Stockwell, professor of modern history
- Alex Stokes, lecturer in physics
- Francis Thompson, historian
- Adam Tickell, Vice-Chancellor of the University of Sussex
- Kathleen Tillotson, academic and literary critic
- Samuel Tolansky, professor of physics
- Vladimir Vapnik, professor of computer science and statistics
- Andrew Wathey, Vice-Chancellor of the University of Northumbria
- Michael Walker, mathematician
- Martin West, classical scholar
- Nathan Widder, professor of political theory
- William Wilson, Fellow of the Royal Society
- Sir Bernard Williams, philosopher
- Michael John Williams, reader in international relations
- John Woolrich, composer, taught in the music department
- Barbara Wootton, Baroness Wootton of Abinger, sociologist

== See also ==
- List of Principals of Royal Holloway, University of London
