= Burnside Library =

Coordinates: 34°56′18″S 138°38′36″E

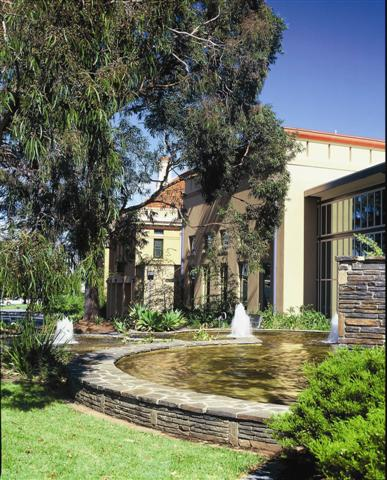
Burnside Library

The Burnside Library is a public library in the City of Burnside, Adelaide. Located on the corner of Greenhill and Portrush Roads, it is part of the Burnside Civic Centre. The library was one of the first public libraries in South Australia, opening to the public on 8 April 1961. In 2000, the library and the civic centre underwent a major renovation. As of 2010, it has 26 computers, free wireless access, and over 6,000 DVDs available to the public. It has more than 1,000 visitors a day and approximately 65% of all residents are registered borrowers. The library collection contains more 135,000 across 2,200 square metres of floor space. In 2015, there were 910,000 item loans. The library provides language classes, genealogy classes, computer classes, author talks, library tours, youth activities, story-time, baby-chat, and other programs.

== Burnside libraries history ==
=== Glen Osmond Institute ===
The first library for the public in the Burnside area was the Glen Osmond Mechanics' Institute, established in 1854 – 2 years before the formation of the District Council of Burnside. A resident of Birksgate near Glen Osmond, solicitor Arthur Hardy, built a room on his property (opposite the Toll House on Mount Barker Road) for the purposes of establishing a Mechanics' Institute. Mechanics' Institutes were an English idea, formed with the philanthropic and rather paternalistic aim of the 'mental improvement of the working man'. The first in South Australia – the Adelaide Mechanics' Institute – was established in 1838 and initially funded solely by members' subscriptions – 24s a year. A library was just one aspect of the institute, which provided not just a reading room and library but also literacy classes, lectures on a wide variety of subjects and musical soirees (often held when there was a full moon, so as to make traveling easier and safer). After 1856 with the passing of the Institutes Act Institute libraries were funded partly by government subsidy and partly by subscription and admission fees and donations and ceased to be known as Mechanics' Institutes. They were however never free public libraries in the modern sense. Arthur Hardy's plan was to provide a building for the use of his employees and those living on his property (he operated a quarry and vineyard), and also neighbors and others who wished to use the facility. According to 'The history and topography of Glen Osmond' 'he only required one restriction, which he thought requisite, ... - that no person should have right to join or remain as a member... without his consent. Mr. Hardy stated at the same time his wish to make the Institute as generally useful as possible, and expressed his belief that he would not have occasion to exercise the power he retained.' Interest in the Institute waned between December 1855 and June 1859 but was revived in June 1859 with a lecture on the Crimean war and the gift of 100 volumes from the English political philosopher John Stuart Mill (he also happened to be Arthur Hardy's brother in law). By the 1860s there were more than 300 books in the library.

A new Institute building was erected on Glen Osmond road in 1877 (with a government subsidy). At the opening the Hon W Morgan MLC made a speech where he said there was no need to enumerate the advantages of such a building – and then proceeded to do just that: people who had children could send them to it for valuable information; ladies whose husbands did not spend all their evenings at home would have the satisfaction of thinking that they were studying in the institute, and bachelors would have a place to profitably pass their leisure hours. (From The history and topography of Glen Osmond). By this time the bookstock had increased to over a thousand volumes.

The Glen Osmond Institute moved again in 1965 to its present site near the top of Portrush Road. The Institutes Association was dissolved in the 1980s but nonetheless at the time of writing (2000) a subscription library still operates there in the Institute building, one of the last in South Australia. (NB the library has since closed and the building has been demolished).

=== Magill Institute ===
The second library for the public in Burnside was established in 1857 and housed in the Magill school on Magill Road. The Magill Institute was never a Mechanics' Institute and while its aims were more modest its activities were similar. When opened, it had 200 books, supplemented, after September 1859, by the temporary loans from the Adelaide Institute. The Magill Institute Library survived well into the 20th century, moving to specially built premises on the Campbelltown side of Magill Road in 1900. This building now houses a picture theatre.

These were the only institute libraries in Burnside; after the Magill Institute moved to the other side of Magill Road, the Glen Osmond Institute was the only public library in Burnside until 1961. Adjoining councils also had institute libraries: on the Norwood Parade there was the Norwood Institute, which now houses the Norwood branch of the Norwood, Payneham and St Peters library service); and in Unley, by 1929, there were 5 institute libraries.

=== Lending libraries ===
Despite the introduction by the State Library of a free Country Lending Service in 1938, an Adult Lending service in 1946 and a Youth Lending Service in 1957, by the 1950s the disadvantages of the centralized services for people in the suburbs together with the deficiencies of the Institute system were well recognized and moves for free municipal libraries gained momentum. After several years of campaigning by the Free library movement, Herbert Skipper of the Libraries Board, politicians (including Don Dunstan) and others in the community the Playford government passed the Libraries (Subsidies) Act in 1955 which provided subsidies to Local Councils for the building, establishment and administration of free public libraries. The first free Municipal library in South Australia was the Elizabeth Library, opened in December 1957. Burnside was not to follow until 1961.

=== Burnside public library ===
Initial proposals for a free library in Burnside came in 1955, but did not bear fruit. S.H. Skipper addressed the Council and at the suggestion of Cr Holmes a report was prepared but nothing much happened until 1957 when the mayor, Philip Claridge, revived the idea. A committee was formed and another report resulted – but no action. Then in February 1958 a more concrete proposal with costing was formulated. The eastern portion of the Town Hall site was suggested as a possible site – but again the matter was deferred, pending a more detailed cost analysis, including the cost of a mobile as well as a static library. In February 1959 Mayor Claridge tried again, telling the Council: "Burnside Council has made a magnificent contribution at considerable cost for the provision of physical recreational facilities for young and old alike. But I think you will agree that other than subsidizing the Burnside Symphony Orchestra and the Burnside Woman’s Choir, it has done very little in promoting the cultural activities for its citizens". Finally, Mayor Claridge's advocacy was successful and a resolution that an approach be made to the Libraries Board setting out a scheme for a library and seeking approval for a subsidy was carried 8 votes to 6. The library opened on 8 April 1961 with a book-stock of 7,800 and a staff of 3. In accordance with Mayor Claridge's vision a children's library was part of the library from the beginning. The cost of the building, furniture and fittings was £10,000, and the annual running costs £4,050 half of which was paid by the State Government. The Council did not need to borrow to establish the library and there was no ratepayer poll or any formal community consultation.

Despite the misgivings of some councilors and others in the community (too costly, not needed because of proximity to the city, the concern a static library would not be accessible to all Burnside residents) the library was an immediate success. By the end of 1961/62 6,576 borrowers were registered and 110,000 books were issued from a stock of 10,000. In 1976 the then Chief Librarian, Ron Butler, reported that staff had issued 3,000,000 books since opening.

In 1975 a home library service was established and the following year the library was extended in size to just under 9,000 square feet (840 m^{2}). Book-stock was increased, a sound lounge was added, and the reference area was expanded. The original fountain on the Greenhill Road frontage caught fire and was replaced with a new one donated by Mr. Roy Carter, the donor of the first fountain. 1981 saw the computerization of the library's circulation system and in 1982 further extensions added a Local History room and increased the size of the administration area and reference and children's libraries.

In 1981 the Burnside Library began providing a mobile library service to the District Council of East Torrens (now part of the Adelaide Hills Council). In 1983 an agreement was reached with the former City of Kensington and Norwood for the Home Service to be extended to that Council in return for a financial contribution, and in 1985 a static library was established in the Institute building on The Norwood Parade – the first free public library in that Council. Burnside ran this library for Kensington and Norwood until 1998. These two joint ventures formed the nucleus for a regional library service, which never progressed any further. Nonetheless, the Burnside Library still provides a Mobile Library service for parts of the Adelaide Hills Council and a Home Service for the former Kensington and Norwood Council.

=== Burnside Millennium project ===
By the early 90s it was clear the library building was too small and looking worn out. In a report to council in December 1992, the manager of the library, Margaret Moxon, outlined a possible future for the library service and discussed the 'information explosion', the broad impact of new technology and the need for extra space for collections and activities. There was Council support but no funds to begin the planning. In 1994 funds were allocated in the next budget to engage a consultant to review the service and a Community Consultative Committee established to oversee the process. The Consultant's report was tabled in December 1994. It recommended the library be expanded to at least twice its present size to maintain existing service levels and to implement an information technology strategy. The report concluded: "The library is full. Either it should be extended to a minimum of 2000sq m, or a new library building should be constructed elsewhere on the Council site".

By 1995 the library redevelopment had become one of the key strategies of the 'Burnside 2006' strategic plan, which proposed a vision for the future of Burnside. Under this plan the Town Hall site - the civic heart of Burnside – was to be extensively redeveloped, and the library was to be the cultural focal point of this plan.

Three options were proposed and on 19 May 1998 the Council passed a resolution which said in part: "As a result of the recent community consultation on the three alternate options proposed for the redevelopment of the Burnside Library, Council adopts in principle, subject to further Community Consultation, Option 3 as a major project for the new millennium…”

A Project Manager (Jim Allen) and Danvers architects were appointed and the project was named the 'Burnside Millennium Project'.

Further community consultation followed over the next 12 months. Then on 20 April 1999 the Council passed a resolution. It said (in part) "That having regard to the extensive consultation process over a twelve-month period Council resolve to proceed with Stage 2 ... with the following modifications:

- Addition of a village green and modified carpark layout/access cab/disabled drop-off point
- Substitution of the café with a reduced floor space for a coffee shop as part of a modified layout for the enhanced community centre
- Addition of a multi-purpose atrium

The resolution was passed 9 votes to 4.

Demolition of the old library commenced in January 2000, with a target completion date for the whole development of April 2001. Cost: $9,000,000 with funding based on a loan repayable over 10 years serviced by an increase in rates over 3 years of 6%.

The library moved into the Community Centre in December 1999, while the Community Centre activities were moved to several different places in Burnside, including the Masonic Hall opposite the Town Hall site.

It took less than 12 months to build the new library. The building is more than seven times the size of the original library.

== See also ==
- Burnside Symphony Orchestra
