= List of libraries in South Australia =

This is a list of libraries in South Australia; the foremost of which is the State Library of South Australia.

Other libraries include:

== Academic libraries ==
- Adelaide Central School of Art Library
- Barr Smith Library (Adelaide University)
- Campus Library (CQUniversity Australia); Greenhill Road, Wayville
- Flinders University Central Library (Flinders University)
- Learning Resources Centre / Library (Torrens University Australia); Wakefield Street
- Tabor Library (Tabor College); Goodwood Road, Millswood

== Public libraries ==
Public libraries in South Australia are run by local councils and Libraries South Australia. Public libraries in SA are all part of the One Card Network, a library consortium which allows a member of any SA public library and return and borrow books from another public library in the state. Many libraries in smaller towns also function as school libraries, called School Community Libraries, and exist in places where there are not enough resources for multiple libraries.

=== Greater Adelaide ===
These are metropolitan public libraries in Adelaide and Greater Adelaide, the capital city of South Australia.

- Adelaide City Libraries (City of Adelaide)
- Adelaide Hills Council Libraries (Adelaide Hills)
- Burnside Library (City of Burnside)
- Campbelltown Public Library (City of Campbelltown)
- Charles Sturt Libraries (City of Charles Sturt; unrelated to Charles Sturt University Library in NSW, with which they share a namesake)
  - Includes Ngutungka West Lakes and Ngutungka Henley.
- Gawler Libraries (Gawler)
- Holdfast Bay Library Service (Holdfast Bay)
- Marion Library Service (City of Marion)
- Mitcham Libraries (Mitcham)
- Mount Barker Community Library (Mount Barker)
- Norwood Payneham & St Peters Library Service (City of Norwood Payneham & St Peters)
- Onkaparinga Library Service (City of Onkaparinga)
- Playford City Library Service (City of Playford)
- Port Adelaide Enfield Library Service (Port Adelaide Enfield)
- Prospect Public Library (Prospect)
- Salisbury Library Service (Salisbury)
- Tea Tree Gully Library (Tea Tree Gully)
- Unley Library Service (Unley)
- Walkerville Library (Town of Walkerville)
- West Torrens Library (West Torrens)

=== Regional Libraries ===
- Adelaide Plains Library Service (Adelaide Plains)
- Alexandrina Library Service (Alexandrina)
- Barossa Council Libraries (Barossa Valley)
- Berri Library and Information Centre (Berri Barmera Council)
- Bordertown Public Library (Tatiara District Council)
- Clare and Gilbert Valleys Council Library Service (Clare Valley and Gilbert River)
- Copper Coast Libraries (Copper Coast Council)
- Streaky Bay School Community Library (District Council of Streaky Bay)
- Flinders Ranges Council Libraries (Flinders Ranges)
- Kangaroo Island Council Libraries (Kangaroo Island)
- Kapunda Visitor Information Centre (Light Regional Council)
- Loxton Library & Visitor Information Centre (Loxton Waikerie)
- Mount Gambier Library (Mount Gambier)
- Murray Bridge Library (Murray Bridge)
- Naracoorte Library and Town Hall (Naracoorte Lucindale Council)
- Port Augusta Library (Port Augusta)
- Port Lincoln Library (City of Port Lincoln)
- Port Pirie Regional Library Service (Port Pirie)
- Renmark Paringa Public Library (Renmark Paringa)
- Robe Public Library and Visitor Information Centre (Robe District)
- Roxby Community Library (Roxby Council)
- Victor Harbor Public Library (City of Victor Habor)
- Wattle Range Libraries (Wattle Range)
- Yorke Peninsula Council Libraries (Yorke Peninsula)

=== Joint school and public libraries ===
- Burra School Community Library (Goyder)
- Cambrai School Community Library (Cambrai)
- Ceduna School Community Library (Ceduna)
- Cleve School Community Library (Cleve)
- Coober Pedy School Community Library (Coober Pedy)
- Coorong Libraries (Coorong Council)
- Cowell School Community Library (Franklin Harbour)
- Cummins School Community Library (Lower Eyre Peninsula)
- Jamestown Community Library (Northern Areas Council)
- Karcultaby School Community Library (Wudinna District Council)
- Karoonda School Community Library (Karoonda East Murray)
- Kimba Library (Kimba)
- Kingston Community School Library (Kingston District Council)
- Leigh Creek School Community Library (Leigh Creek)
- Lock School Community Library (Elliston)
- Lucindale School Community Library (Naracoorte Lucindale Council)
- Mary Lattin Memorial (District Council of Grant)
- Orroroo Community Library (Orroroo Carrieton)
- Peterborough School and Community Library (Peterborough)
- Port Broughton School Community Library (Barunga West Council)
- Swan Reach Community Library (Mid-Murray Council)
- Tumby Bay School Community Library (Tumby Bay)
- Pinnaroo and Lameroo Libraries (Southern Mallee District Council)
- Wakefield Community Libraries (Wakefield Regional Council)
- Whyalla Public Library (Whyalla)
- Yankalilla Cultural Centre and Library (Yankalilla)

== Special libraries ==
- Women's Studies Resource Centre (closed)
- York Gate Library (Royal Geographical Society of Australasia)

=== GLAM libraries ===
- AGSA's Research Library (Art Gallery of South Australia Research)
- South Australian Museum Library

=== Legal libraries ===
- South Australian Parliamentary Research Library

=== Theological libraries ===
- Australian Lutheran College (ALC) Library; Pulteney Street, Adelaide city centre

== See also ==
- Mechanics' institutes of Australia
