= Stephen Hill (academic) =

British academic (1946–2023)

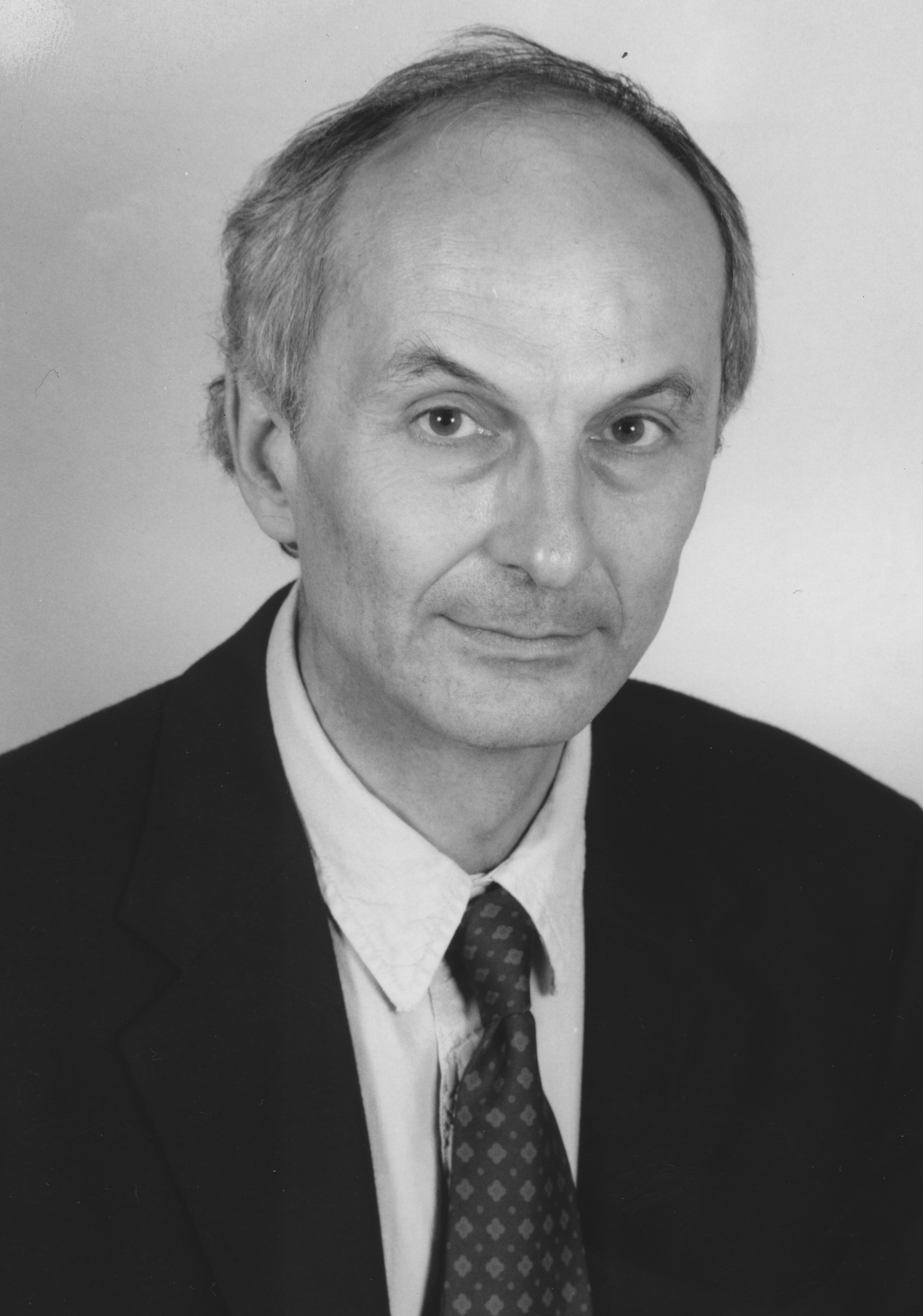
Stephen Hill, c. 1990s

Stephen Roderick Hill (15 March 1946 – 18 April 2023) was a British academic. He was Professor of Management at the University of London from 2001 to 2011. He was also Principal of Royal Holloway College, University of London (RHC) from 2001 to 2009.

== Early life and education ==
Stephen Roderick Hill was born on 15 March 1946. He was educated at University College School. He then obtained a BA in Modern History at Balliol College, Oxford. He was later awarded an MSc in Sociology at the London School of Economics (LSE) followed in 1973 by a PhD.

== Career ==
Hill held various position in Sociology and Industrial Relations at Bedford College, University of London (1968–70) and the LSE from 1971 where he was Professor of Sociology from 1991 to 2001 and Professor of Management (2001–02). Hill was chief editor of the British Journal of Sociology for seven years, until 2003.

== Personal life and death ==
In 1970, he married Jane Severn and they had one son and one daughter. The marriage was dissolved in 1993. In 1996, he married Siobhan Rosser. Hill died on 18 April 2023, at the age of 77.

Academic offices
Preceded by Sir Drummond Bone	Principal of Royal Holloway College; University of London; 2001-2009	Succeeded by Paul Layzell (2010– )
