= Richmond and Hillcroft Adult Community College =

Community college in Greater London, England

Location
- Parkshot; Richmond, Greater London, TW9 2RE; England; 51°27′52″N 0°18′10″W

Information
- Type: Further education college
- Established: 1895 onwards – founding institutions 2017 – Richmond and Hillcroft Adult Community College
- Department for Education URN: 131095 Tables
- Ofsted: Reports
- Principal: Gabrielle Flint
- Gender: Mixed
- Age: 16+
- Enrolment: 6,700+ (Richmond Adult Community College, 2015)
- Website: https://www.racc.ac.uk/

Richmond and Hillcroft Adult Community College is a further education college located in Richmond in Greater London. It was established in 2017 by a merger between Richmond Adult Community College and the specialist Hillcroft College.

== History ==
The college's Richmond campus traces its roots to the 19th century as a technical institute. In the latter part of the 19th century, there was no reasonable secondary education in or near Barnes and Richmond with only an elementary education available, except for those who could afford private tuition or send their children many miles to school. Richmond County was to be one of a series of new technical buildings built by the county council in Surrey's seven principal towns. The site was opened on 2 July 1895 in Kew Road, Richmond and was fee paying. This building housed both the Technical Institute and secondary school. When the school merged with Sheen Grammar School in 1939 the school moved out of the Kew Road premises leaving the Technical Institute as sole occupants of the Kew Road site.

The technical institute continued up to the Second World War when it was used as an ARP (Air Raid Precautions) and ambulance depot. It was revived as the Technical Institute and School of Art for Richmond and Barnes in 1947 and in 1954 renamed as the Richmond Institute of Further Education. In 1970 it became the Richmond Adult College and in 1978 transferred to the Parkshot site, vacant with the closure of Richmond County School for Girls and as the Richmond Adult & Community College remains at that site. The college also previously occupied The Clifden Centre in Twickenham, the campus of the former Twickenham County Grammar School for Girls (which became the comprehensive Twickenham Girls' School). The college relocated from the Clifden Centre to the main college campus in September 2014, making way for St Richard Reynolds Catholic College.

The college's site in Surbiton was previously Hillcroft College, a residential adult education college for women. Originally called The National Residential College for Women, the college was established in 1920, as a residential college solely for the education of adult women. The college was intended to be a female equivalent to Ruskin College in Oxford. In this regard, Hillcroft College was unique in the British further education sector. The college was owned and operated by the Hillcroft Charitable Trust. The college's joint founder, and first principal (1929–1933) was Fanny Street. Street was acting principal of Royal Holloway College (RHC), University of London, from 1944 to 1945 when Edith Clara Batho took over.

In September 2017, Richmond Adult Community College and Hillcroft College merged to form Richmond and Hillcroft Adult Community College. In December 2024, the Hillcroft site closed, with all teaching moving to the Richmond site.

== Location ==
The college's campus is situated on Twickenham Road (A316) Richmond, just west of the Richmond Circus roundabout with the A307. It is opposite the Old Deer Park, and just north of Richmond tube station. The former Hillcroft campus was at South Bank, Surbiton.

== Courses ==
The college offers a range of courses including GCSEs, NVQs and Access courses. In addition, the college offers some higher education courses in conjunction with the University of Westminster.

== Notable alumni ==
- Mavis Cheek (1948–2023), English novelist and feminist
- Joyce Robertson (1919–2013), British psychiatric social worker
