= Walthamstow School for Girls =

Location
- Church Hill; Walthamstow, London, E17 3ND; England; 51.585294°N 0.013966°W

Information
- Type: Community school
- Motto: "Neglect Not The Gift That Is In Thee." The motto is depicted in the main hall's stage and across the school.
- Established: 1880
- Local authority: Waltham Forest
- Department for Education URN: 103103 Tables
- Ofsted: Reports
- Headteacher: Helen Marriott
- Staff: 300
- Gender: Girls
- Age: 11 to 16
- Enrolment: 891
- Colour: Bottle Green
- Website: www.wsfg.waltham.sch.uk

Walthamstow School for Girls is a single sex girls' secondary school situated in Walthamstow, London. It currently educates 900 girls between the ages of 11–16.

Locally, the school is known as 'Green School'. It is close to Walthamstow Central and the Prime Meridian.

== History ==
It opened in 1890 as a private school on West Avenue, then moved to Church Hill. The school was refurbished in 2009. It occupies three main buildings, which have areas dedicated to subjects taught in the school. The school saw a new head teacher take over in September 2012.

== Notable pupils/staff ==
- Miranda Grell, Labour Councillor and first person to be found guilty of making false statements under the Representation of the People Act 1983
- Frances Horovitz, poet and broadcaster
- Ada Maddocks, trade unionist
- Patricia Scotland, Baroness Scotland of Asthal, Attorney General for England and Wales from 2007 to 2010
- Dorothy Wedderburn Principal of Bedford College and later Royal Holloway College
- Naomi Ackie, actress
- Eloise poulton , song and play writer
