= Gwendoline Butler =

British writer

Gwendoline Williams Butler
- Born: Gwendoline Williams; 19 August 1922; South London, England, United Kingdom
- Died: 5 January 2013 (aged 90)
- Occupation: Novelist
- Spouse: Lionel Harry Butler (1949–1981)
- Children: 1
- Writing career
- Pen name: Gwendoline Butler, Jennie Melville
- Language: English
- Period: 1956–2002
- Genres: mystery, romance

Gwendoline Williams Butler (née Williams; 19 August 1922 – 5 January 2013) was a British writer of mystery fiction and romance novels. She also wrote under the pseudonym Jennie Melville. Credited with inventing the "woman's police procedural," Butler is known for the Inspector John Coffin series and the Charmian Daniels series (published under the pseudonym Jennie Melville). Her works include modern detective stories, Victorian mysteries, Gothic tales, and romantic novels.

== Biography ==
Gwendoline Williams was born on 19 August 1922 in South London, England, the daughter of Alice (Lee) and Alfred Edward Williams. She attended Lady Margaret Hall, Oxford, where she studied History and later became a lecturer.

On 16 October 1949, she married Lionel Harry Butler (1923–1981), a professor of medieval history at the University of St Andrews, and a historian who held fellowships at All Souls and was principal of Royal Holloway College. They had one daughter.

In 1956, she began publishing her John Coffin series of novels under her married name, Gwendoline Butler. Later, in 1962, she adopted her grandmother's name, Jennie Melville, as a pseudonym for her Charmian Daniels novels. Besides her mystery series, she also authored romantic novels. In 1981, her book "The Red Staircase" earned her the Romantic Novel of the Year Award from the Romantic Novelists' Association. In 1973, the Crime Writers' Association (CWA) awarded her the Silver Dagger for her novel "A Coffin for Pandora."

Butler was a former member of the Committee of the CWA and a member of the Detection Club.

She died on 5 January 2013.

== Bibliography ==
=== As Gwendoline Butler ===
==== John Coffin Series ====
Inspector Winter was the primary detective in the first three stories. He also appeared in the fourth story, "The Dull Dead" (1958). In subsequent works, the young John Coffin, described as "mercurial," made his debut and became the main protagonist in subsequent works. The book "Coffin in the Black Museum" (1989) relocated him from South London to an imaginary district in East London based on Docklands.

==== Books in the series ====
1. Receipt for Murder (1956)
2. Dead in a Row (1957)
3. The Murdering Kind (1958)
4. The Dull Dead (1958)
5. The Interloper (1959)
6. Death Lives Next Door (1960) also known as "Dine and Be Dead"
7. Make Me a Murderer (1961)
8. Coffin in Oxford (1962)
9. A Coffin for Baby (1963)
10. Coffin Waiting (1964)
11. Coffin in Malta (1964)
12. A Nameless Coffin (1966)
13. Coffin Following (1968)
14. Coffin's Dark Number (1969)
15. A Coffin from the Past (1970)
16. A Coffin for Pandora (1973)
17. A Coffin for the Canary (1974)
18. Coffin On the Water (1986)
19. Coffin in Fashion (1987)
20. Coffin Underground (1988)
21. Coffin in the Museum of Crime (1989) also known as "Coffin in the Black Museum"
22. Coffin and the Paper Man (1990)
23. Coffin on Murder Street (1991)
24. Cracking Open a Coffin (1992)
25. A Coffin For Charley (1993)
26. The Coffin Tree (1994)
27. A Dark Coffin (1995)
28. A Double Coffin (1996)
29. Coffin's Game (1997)
30. A Grave Coffin (1998)
31. Coffin's Ghost (1999)
32. A Cold Coffin (2000)
33. A Coffin for Christmas (2000)
34. Coffin Knows the Answer (2002)

==== Major Mearns and Sergeant Denny Series ====
1. The King Cried Murder (1999)
2. Dread Murder (2006)

==== Single novels ====
- Sarsen Place (1974)
- Olivia (1975)
- The Vesey Inheritance (1975)
- The Brides of Friedberg (1977) also known as "Meadowsweet"
- The Red Staircase (1979)
- Albion Walk (1982)
- Butterfly (1996)
- Let There Be Love (1997)

=== As Jennie Melville ===
==== Charmian Daniels Series ====
1. Come Home and Be Killed (1962)
2. Burning Is a Substitute for Loving (1963)
3. Murderers' Houses (1964)
4. There Lies Your Love (1965)
5. Nell Alone (1966)
6. A Different Kind of Summer (1967)
7. A New Kind of Killer, an Old Kind of Death (1970) also known as "A New Kind of Killer" (US title)
8. Murder Has a Pretty Face (1981)
9. Death in the Garden (1987) also known as "Murder in the Garden" (US title)
10. Windsor Red (1988)
11. A Cure for Dying (1989) also known as "Making Good Blood" (US title)
12. Witching Murder (1990)
13. Footsteps in the Blood (1990)
14. Dead Set (1992)
15. Whoever Has the Heart (1993)
16. Baby Drop (1994) also known as "A Death in the Family" (US title)
17. The Morbid Kitchen (1995)
18. The Woman Who Was Not There (1996)
19. Revengeful Death (1998)
20. Stone Dead (1998)
21. Dead Again (2000)
22. Loving Murder (2001)

==== Single novels ====
- Hunter in the Shadows (1969)
- The Summer Assassin (1971)
- Ironwood (1972)
- Nun's Castle (1973)
- Raven's Forge (1975)
- Dragon's Eye (1976)
- Axwater (1978) a.k.a. Tarot's Tower (US title)
- Painted Castle (1982)
- Hand of Glass (1983)
- Listen to the Children (1986)
- Complicity (2000)
