= Bill Wedderburn, Baron Wedderburn of Charlton =

British politician

The Right Honourable The Lord Wedderburn of Charlton QC FBA
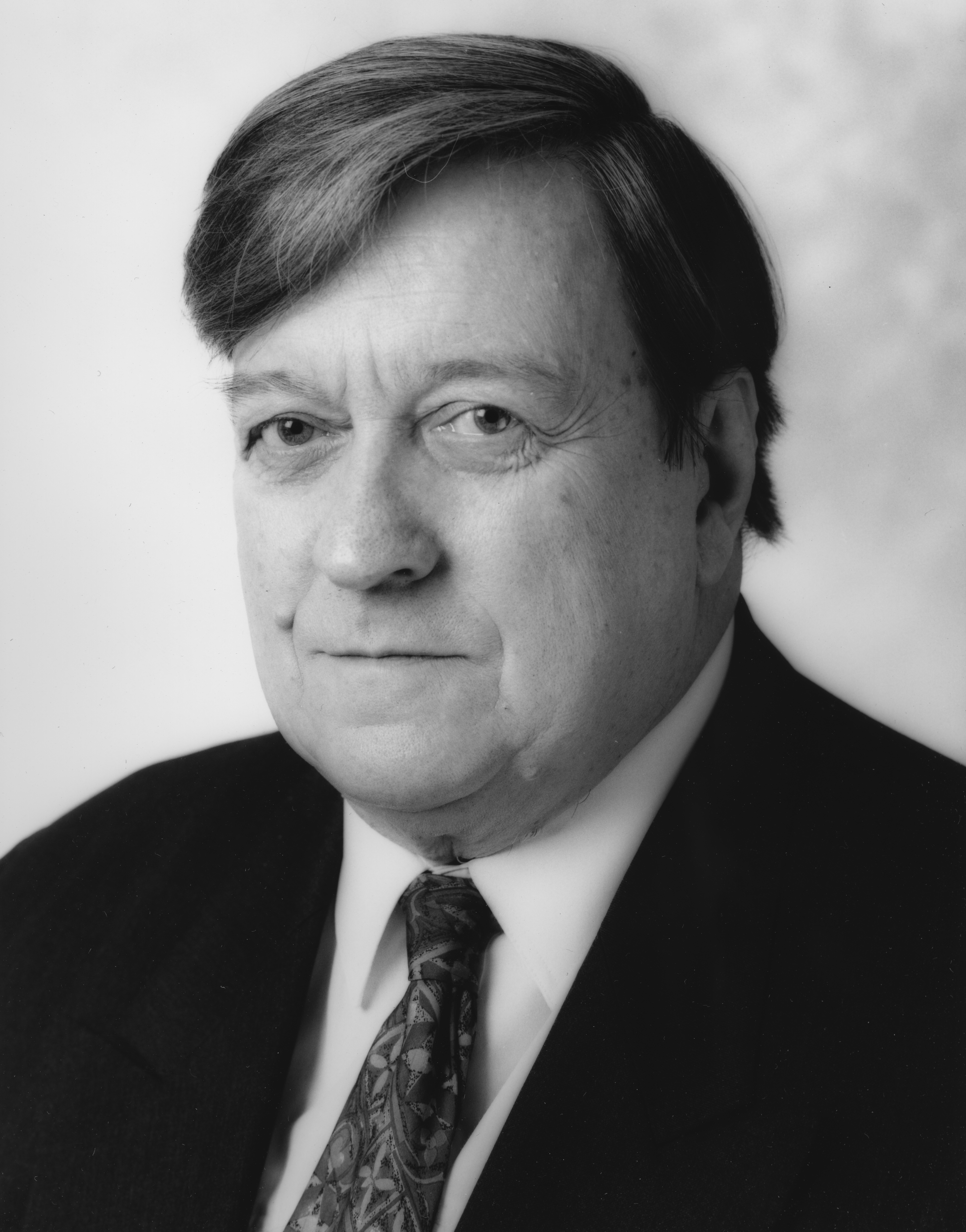

Member of the House of Lords
- Lord Temporal
- Life peerage 20 July 1977 – 9 March 2012

Personal details
- Born: 13 April 1927 London, United Kingdom
- Died: 9 March 2012 (aged 84) London, United Kingdom
- Party: Labour
- Spouse(s): Nina Salaman (m. 1951; div. 1962) Dorothy Cole (m. 1962; div. 1969) Frances Knight (m. 1969)
- Children: Sarah; David; Lucy; Jonathan
- Education: Queens' College, Cambridge, London School of Economics

Kenneth William Wedderburn, Baron Wedderburn of Charlton, QC, FBA (13 April 1927 – 9 March 2012) was a British politician and member of the House of Lords, affiliated with the Labour Party. He briefly became a crossbench member, citing his dislike of Blairism and 'the smell' of cash for questions. He re-took the Labour Party whip in 2007. He worked at the University of Cambridge and the London School of Economics, where he was the Cassel Professor of Commercial Law from 1964 until his retirement in 1992.

== Education and career ==
After taking a BA in law from Queens' College, Cambridge, Wedderburn served in the RAF for two years. He had a long career in labour law, and on 20 July 1977 was created a life peer with the title Baron Wedderburn of Charlton, of Highgate in Greater London (Wedderburn chose this title as a tribute to his favourite football team Charlton Athletic F.C.).

He was an Honorary Associate of the National Secular Society and a Distinguished Supporter of the British Humanist Association. Wedderburn also served as a key member of the 1977 Bullock Committee.

== Personal life ==
In 1951 he married Nina Salaman, a medical researcher from a family of scientists and named after a grandmother. They had three children, Sarah, David and Lucy. The marriage ended in divorce.

His second marriage in 1962 was to Dorothy Cole, a social scientist and university administrator. It also ended in divorce. His third marriage in 1969 was to Frances Knight with whom he had a son, Jonathan. He was a direct descendant of Jamaican-born radical leader and anti-slavery advocate Robert Wedderburn and thus also of the Jacobite rebel Sir John Wedderburn, 5th Baronet of Blackness.

== Bibliography ==
Articles

- 'Shareholders' rights and the rule in Foss v Harbottle' [1957] 16 CLJ 194
- 'Freedom of Association and Philosophies of Labour Law' [1989] 18 Industrial Law Journal
- 'Consultation and Collective Bargaining in Europe: Success or Ideology' [1997] Industrial Law Journal
- 'Employees, Partnership and Company Law' [2002] Industrial Law Journal

Books

- The Worker and the Law, Penguin Books Ltd; 3rd Revised edition (25 September 1986), ISBN 0140226591

== See also ==
- UK labour law
- UK company law
- Bullock Report
