= Arthur Munro =

John Arthur Ruskin Munro (1864–1944) was the Rector of Lincoln College, Oxford.

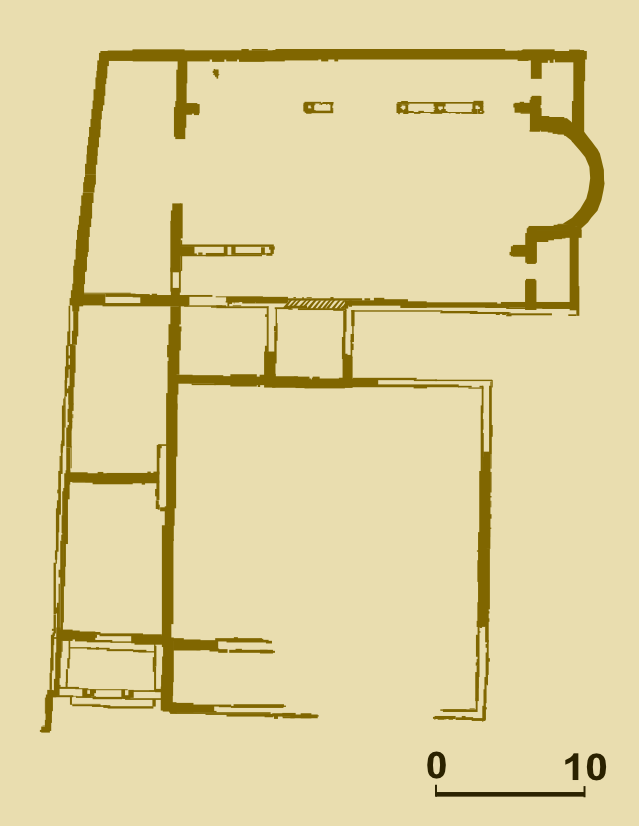
"Basilica A" in Doclea (Prevalis) from the sixth century

J. A. R. Munro was the son of the Pre-Raphaelite sculptor Alexander Munro. He was educated at Charterhouse School in southern England, as was his younger brother Henry Acland Munro.

Munro was an archaeologist, a historian and a teacher. There is a collection of his lectures, on ancient Greece and on the history of Athens, in Bodleian Archives & Manuscripts, the Bodleian Library, Oxford (MSS. Eng. misc. d. 642–643).

Munro left artworks to the Ashmolean Museum in Oxford.

== Books ==
- William Cliffe Foley Anderson, Francis John Haverfield, Joseph Grafton Milne, and John Arthur Ruskin Munro, On the Roman town of Doclea in Montenegro.

Academic offices
Preceded by William Walter Merry	Rector of Lincoln College, Oxford; 1919–1944	Succeeded by Keith Anderson Hope Murray
