= Inez Holden =

British writer (1903–1974)

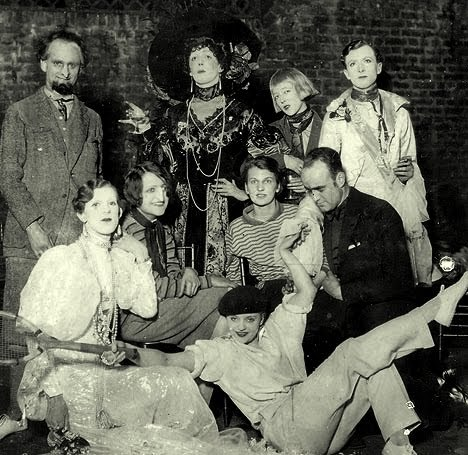
The Impersonation Party, 1927. Back row: Elizabeth Ponsonby, in wig as Iris Tree, Cecil Beaton on her right. Seated: Stephan Tennant, as Queen Marie of Rumania, Georgia Sitwell, with false nose, Inez Holden, Harold Acton.Foreground: Tallulah Bankhead, as Jean Borotra.

Beatrice Inez Lisette (Paget) Holden (21 November 1903 – 30 May 1974) was a British writer and Bohemian social figure and journalist, also known for her association with George Orwell. Born at Wellesbourne, Warwickshire to Wilfred Millington Holden (of the family listed in Burke's Landed Gentry 1952 edition as 'Holden of Bromson', a branch of the family of 'Holden of Hawton and Sibdon'; he served as a Lieutenant in the Bihar Light Horse and 15th Hussars) and Beatrice Mary Byng Paget (the daughter of Herbert Byng Paget, of Darley House, Darley Dale, Derbyshire, of the family listed in Burke's Landed Gentry as 'Paget of Loughborough'), with an elder brother, Wilfred Herbert, born in 1902, she was a cousin of the twins Celia Mary and Mamaine, who became Arthur Koestler's second wife. Her first memory was her father shooting at – and missing – her mother; their relationship was contentious, as was Holden's own relationship with her mother, who was considered to be the second best horsewoman in England. She kept fifteen chargers, but although her extravagant nature allowed her to visit the Ritz when in London, her daughter did not benefit from it. According to Bluemel (in 'George Orwell and the Radical Eccentrics', which devotes considerable attention to Holden), Holden's status as 'a dropout from the gentry class who worked as both factory hand and intellectual' is a contributing factor in the value of her work both generally speaking and for feminist scholars.

An allowance from her maternal uncle Jack Paget was necessarily supplemented by work for the Daily Express (with Evelyn Waugh), as well as short stories she wrote for the Evening Standard, Manchester Guardian and various magazines. The publication of her first novel, Sweet Charlatan, was substantially aided by the extent to which her personal charm impacted upon Thomas Balston, a director of Duckworth's. She was one of a handful of women writers of the period to be published in Horizon, Cyril Connolly's leading literary magazine. She was at the time working in an aircraft factory. Holden was sent to report on the Nuremberg Trials; her journalism and writing film scripts for J. Arthur Rank would come to take precedence over her literary endeavours. In the 1950s, in a poor financial state, friends including Sally Chilver (Robert Graves's niece), who worked at the Institute of Commonwealth Studies, arranged for her to be paid for research into the archives of the Baptist Mission to West Africa.

Considered 'very pretty...the fashionable type of beauty' with '"consumptive charm"' (Anthony Powell, 'To Keep the Ball Rolling'), she was the model for two Augustus John drawings, but after suffering a glandular disorder and botched operation in 1933 her looks were somewhat adversely affected by weight gain. She at one point lived in a mews flat over a garage in the garden of H. G. Wells' house in Regent's Park (she liked the fact that it overlooked trees, as this gave the illusion of living in the country). Holden was present when Orwell and Wells notoriously quarrelled in August 1941, in a meeting she had arranged at Orwell's flat in St John's Wood, unaware that Orwell had recently criticised Wells in an article in Horizon; as a result, she was evicted by Wells. She was a friend of the poet and novelist Stevie Smith; Holden was the model for Lopez in Smith's 1949 novel 'The Holiday'. Smith considered Holden to be 'vigorous' and 'buccaneering', with 'admirable courage and admirable high heart'; these characteristics she included in Lopez. Unfortunately insecurity on Holden's part based on Smith's greater successes led to the deterioration of the friendship – in 1959, Smith commented that Holden would 'hardly address a word' to her. Nonetheless, Holden did visit Smith during her final illness, and wrote an obituary on Smith's death in 1971.

Holden never married, but had a tumultuous romantic relationship with the author and painter Humphrey Slater during the 1940s. She was a close friend, and briefly lover, of George Orwell; as such she is mentioned in many biographical works on the author. Anthony Powell's memoir 'To Keep the Ball Rolling' recounts his first meeting with Orwell in 1941, in which Holden played a part. He refers to her as 'a torrential talker, an accomplished mimic... excellent company'. Powell based the character of Roberta Payne, an aspiring writer who captivates more than one male character, in his novel What's Become of Waring, on Holden, she being "pretty, witty, and at home in a variety of London circles, some quite exalted... without any visible means of support except her writing".

Following her death, 'Inez Holden: A Memoir', featuring contributions from her cousin Celia and her friend, the novelist Anthony Powell, appeared in the London Magazine October/ November 1974 issue. Lord Shackleton, who had been the permanent tenant of the lower floor of Holden's flat in Lower Belgrave Street and a close friend, also wrote a short eulogy which appeared in The Times. According to Powell, after the Second World War Holden had lived near Baker Street before moving to Lower Belgrave Street, in her latter years been "a compulsive newspaper reader and TV viewer, she would become obsessed by subjects the papers were running – say, sex-change or computer dating – and talk of these without cease throughout a whole luncheon or dinner", and would sometimes be seen dressed in "stray adjuncts of military uniform".

In 2019, Handheld Press reissued Holden's Nightshift and It Was Different at the Time in a single volume titled Blitz Writing; There's No Story There was published in 2021. A selection of her late work, including her articles for Punch under Powell’s editorship, was published in 2023.

== Works ==
- Sweet Charlatan (1929)
- Born Old, Died Young (1932)
- Death in High Society and Other Stories (1933) in Basic English
- Friend of the Family (1933)
- Night Shift (1941)
- It Was Different at the Time (1943)
- There's No Story There (1944)
- To the Boating and Other Stories (1945)
- The Owner (1952), London : The Bodley Head, 1952
- The Adults (1956)
- Blitz writing : night shift & it was different at the time, edited by Kristin Bluemel, Bath : Handheld Press, 2019, ISBN 978-1-912766-06-2
- There's no story there : wartime writing, 1944-1945, Kate Macdonald (Ed.), Bath : Handheld Press, 2021, ISBN 978-1-912766-36-9
- Late stories : Punch and Powell, edited by Jeff Manley, Robin Bynoe ; with additional material by Anthony Powell, Celia Goodman, Jeff Manley, Robin Bynoe, Stratford Upon Avon : Anthony Powell Society, 2023, ISBN 978-0-9956267-7-5

== Notes ==
- http://www.findmypast.co.uk/home.jsp – Birth, Marriage and Death records and Census indexes
- Barber, Michael, Anthony Powell: A Life (Duckworth Overlook, 2004)
- Bluemel, Kristin, George Orwell and the Radical Eccentrics (Palgrave Macmillan, 2004)
- Powell, Anthony, To Keep the Ball Rolling (Penguin Books, 1983)
- Spaulding, Frances, Stevie Smith A Critical Biography (Faber & Faber, 1988)
