= Dorothy Wedderburn =

English sociologist and college head (1925–2012)

Dorothy Enid Wedderburn
- Born: 18 September 1925; Walthamstow, England
- Died: 20 September 2012 (aged 87)
- Education: Walthamstow County High School for Girls
- Alma mater: Girton College, Cambridge
- Spouse(s): A N "Max" Cole Bill Wedderburn (m. 1962; div. 1968)
- Relatives: George Barnard (brother)
- Scientific career
- Fields: Social and Economic Studies
- Workplaces: Bedford College; Cambridge University; Imperial College; University of London

Dorothy Enid Wedderburn (née Barnard, formerly Cole; 18 September 1925 – 20 September 2012) was Principal of Bedford College, part of the University of London, and after the merger with Royal Holloway College, another college of the university, was the first principal of the combined institution.

== Education ==
Wedderburn was born in Walthamstow and educated at Walthamstow County High School for Girls in north-east London and Girton College, Cambridge, where she read economics. She joined the Communist Party in the 1940s, but ended her membership of the party in the late 1950s, while remaining on the left of the labour movement.

== Career ==
=== Cambridge and Imperial ===
She was a research officer at the Board of Trade from 1946 to 1966, did research in applied economics at Cambridge and then worked as a lecturer, and subsequently reader and professor, in industrial sociology at the Imperial College of Science and Technology in London, then part of the University of London, from 1965 to 1981. In 1974 she was part of the government's committee that published the 1975 Halsbury Report into pay and conditions for nurses and midwives. At Imperial she was head of the Department of Social and Economic Studies from 1978 to 1981.

=== Bedford and Royal Holloway merger ===
In 1981 she became Principal of Bedford College. The 1982 partnership agreement between Bedford and Royal Holloway was signed as a result of severe cuts in government spending on higher education. Discussions had taken place between Wedderburn and Holloway's then principal, Dr Lionel Butler. Before anything was finalised, Butler died suddenly on 26 November 1981. Following this, final discussions took place between Wedderburn and Dr Roy Miller, Holloway's new principal. These included Bedford leaving its site in Regent's Park, London and moving to the Holloway site. The merger finally took place in 1985 and the newly merged Royal Holloway and Bedford New College was inaugurated in 1986 by Her Majesty The Queen at a ceremony at Royal Holloway's chapel. Wedderburn was appointed as first principal of the merged college and served from 1985 to 1990, and was also the last principal of Bedford.

The official title (Royal Holloway and Bedford New College) is still retained, but for everyday use the college is now referred to as Royal Holloway, University of London or simply Royal Holloway, London. On leaving Royal Holloway she declined the damehood normally offered to former female principals. There is no explanation given in any of the published obituaries.

=== Sale of Royal Holloway's paintings ===
The late 1980s were difficult times financially for universities including the new college. She closed the Chemistry Department, for which the extensive Bourne building had been constructed in the late 1960s, as chemistry had become too expensive a subject. She reduced staff across all departments and, more controversially, agreed to the sale of the three most valuable paintings in RHC's collection.

Between 1993 and 1995, a J. M. W. Turner (Van Tromp going about to please his Masters, Ships at Sea, getting a good wetting c. 1844), John Constable (A Sketch for View on the Stour, nr Dedham c.1821/2) and Thomas Gainsborough (Peasants going to Market: Early Morning c. 1770) were sold for a total of £21m. Holloway's remaining paintings were worth about £17m, but probably now substantially more.

=== Other posts ===
Wedderburn was a Pro-Vice-Chancellor of the University of London from 1986 to 1988. From 1981 to 2003 she was also a senior research fellow at Imperial College. She was Honorary President of the Fawcett Society from 1986 to 2002. From 1998 to 2000, she was chair of the Committee of Enquiry into Women in Prison.

== Personal life ==
She was married twice: to the economic historian A N "Max" Cole from whom she was divorced in 1960. From 1962 to 1968, she was married to Bill Wedderburn, Baron Wedderburn of Charlton, a union that also ended in divorce. Both marriages were childless.

Dorothy Wedderburn's brother, George, was President of the Royal Statistical Society and Institute of Mathematics and its Applications in the 1970s and Emeritus Professor of Mathematics at the University of Essex.

== Publications ==
Wedderburn wrote extensively on social issues including White Collar Redundancy (1964), Enterprise Planning for Change (1964), The Economic Circumstances of Old People (1962) and later Justice for Women (2000).

== See also ==
- Keith Murray, Baron Murray of Newhaven – Author of the Murray Report on London University 1972

Academic offices
Preceded by John Nicholson Black	Principal; Bedford College; University of London; 1981–85	Succeeded by None; College merged with Royal Holloway
Preceded by Dr Roy Miller (Principal of Royal Holloway College)	Principal; Royal Holloway and Bedford New College; University of London; 1985–1990	Succeeded by Professor Norman Gowar
