= Francis Helps =

British artist (1890–1972)

- Born: 1890; Dulwich, London, England
- Died: 1972 (aged 81–82)
- Education: Dulwich College
- Alma mater: Slade School of Fine Art
- Known for: Painting

Francis William Helps (1890-1972) was a British artist who, besides a long career as an art teacher, served as the official artist to the 1924 British expedition to Everest.

== Biography ==
Helps was born in Dulwich in London and, between 1903 and 1907, he attended Dulwich College while also receiving art lessons from a private tutor. In 1908, he enrolled at the Slade School of Fine Art in London. During World War I, Helps joined the Artists' Rifles and saw active service in France. Helps joined the 1924 British Mount Everest expedition as an official artist. He completed some eighty paintings and drawings of the expedition members and the Himalayan landscape which were subsequently displayed at the Alpine Club in London.

Helps took a full-time teaching post at the Royal College of Art, RCA, in 1931. In 1933, he was elected a member of the Royal Society of British Artists. He also exhibited at the Royal Academy. He left the RCA in 1934 but rejoined their teaching staff during World War II while the college was relocated to the Lake District. During the war, the War Artists' Advisory Committee purchased at least one portrait by Helps. He also painted Emily Penrose in her role as principal of Somerville College, Oxford.

In 1953, Helps became head of the painting at the Leeds College of Art, a post he held until his retirement. In 1971, he moved to Bromley and died the following year.
