= City of Playford Library Service =

Public library service in South Australia

Coordinates: 34°43′05″S 138°40′18″E

Exterior entrance to the Elizabeth Library

Interior view of the Elizabeth Library

Feature wall in the Elizabeth Library

Playford Mobile Library

Munno Para Library External View

Munno Para Library 'Engine Room'

Munno Para Library Cafe Area

Munno Para Library Xbox Playing Area

The City of Playford Library Service is the public library service of the City of Playford which is located in the northern suburbs of Adelaide, South Australia.

The City of Playford Library Service consists of the branch Libraries in Elizabeth (Playford Civic Centre) and Munno Para (Stretton Centre), the Mobile and Home Library Service.

As of October 2011 the Library has over 66,000 registered borrowers and a collection exceeding 107,000 items.

== History ==
The Elizabeth South Public Library was opened on 4 December 1957 by Sir Thomas Playford, making it the first free municipal public Library to open in Adelaide.

Sir Thomas was the first to join and become Member No 1A in Library No. A1!

Subsequent branches were constructed over the intervening years:

- Elizabeth North opened 4 July 1960
- Elizabeth Town Centre opened 15 September 1969

The first Munno Para Library was opened on 5 February 1966.

In 2005 the Elizabeth Civic Centre and Munno Para (Smithfield) branches opened in their present premises.

In December 2007 the Playford Library Service celebrated its 50th birthday. This included a celebration event involving past and present staff including the first chief Librarian, Warwick Dunstun and a well attended community birthday party.

The Youth Focus Library was awarded the South Australian Chapter Design Institute of Australia 2004 Award of Merit and short listed in the Public/Institutional Interior Design Category of the 2005 Interior Design Awards.

== See also ==
- City of Playford
- State Library of South Australia
- List of libraries in South Australia
