= Paul Langford =

British historian (1945–2015)

Professor Paul Langford FBA FRHistS
- Born: 20 November 1945; Bridgend, Wales
- Died: 27 July 2015 (aged 69)
- Occupations: Historian and academic
- Board member of: Arts and Humanities Research Board
- Spouse: Margaret Edwards (m. 1970)
- Children: 1

Academic background
- Education: Monmouth School
- Alma mater: Hertford College, Oxford
- Thesis: The first Rockingham administration, 1765-66 (1971)
- Doctoral advisor: John B. Owen; Lucy Sutherland

Academic work
- Discipline: History
- Sub-discipline: Political history; Georgian era
- Institutions: Lincoln College, Oxford
- Doctoral students: Andrew O'Shaughnessy
- Notable works: A Polite and Commercial People: England 1727-1783 (1989)

Paul Langford FBA FRHistS (20 November 1945 – 27 July 2015) was a British historian. From 2000 until late 2012 he was the rector of Lincoln College, Oxford, succeeded by Professor Henry Woudhuysen.

Educated at Monmouth School and Hertford College, Oxford, Langford was elected to a junior research fellowship in modern history at Lincoln College in 1969, becoming a tutorial fellow in 1970. He was a lecturer at the University of Oxford from 1971 to 1994, being elected a reader in modern history in 1994 and becoming a professor in 1996.

Having served as a member of the Humanities Research Board from 1995, in 1998 he was appointed chairman and chief executive of the newly established Arts and Humanities Research Board, "dashing around the country, successfully selling the idea that research in the arts and humanities should be as fully and imaginatively funded as research in the social or natural sciences." He held this post until returning to Oxford to take up the rectorship of Lincoln College in 2000.

Langford was a fellow of the Royal Historical Society from 1979, a fellow of the British Academy from 1993 and was made an honorary fellow of Hertford College in 2000. In 2002, the University of Sheffield awarded him an honorary Doctor of Letters.

His notable publications include A Polite and Commercial People. England 1727-1783, the first volume to be published in the New Oxford History of England.

Langford married Margaret Edwards in 1970 and they had one son: Hugh. He was a freeman of the Worshipful Company of Haberdashers.

== Selected writings ==
- P. Langford, The First Rockingham Administration, 1765–6 (Oxford, 1973)
- P. Langford, The Excise Crisis: Society and Politics in the Age of Walpole (Oxford, 1975)
- P. Langford, The Eighteenth Century, 1688–1815 (London, 1976)
- P. Langford and W. B. Todd (eds.), The Writings and Speeches of Edmund Burke, vol. 2 “Party, Parliament, and the American War, 1766–1774.” (Oxford, 1981)
- P. Langford, A Polite and Commercial People: England 1727–1783 (Oxford, 1989)
- P. Langford, Public Life and the Propertied Englishman 1689–1798 (Oxford, 1991)
- P. Langford, Eighteenth-Century Britain: a Very Short Introduction (Oxford, 2000)

Academic offices
Preceded by Eric Anderson	Rector of Lincoln College, Oxford; 2000–2012	Succeeded by Henry Woudhuysen
