= Margaret Hayes-Robinson =

British historian (1876–1930)

- Born: 7 April 1876
- Died: 1930 (aged 53–54); Oxford
- Occupation: Academic historian

Academic background
- Education: Cheltenham Ladies' College
- Alma mater: St Hilda's College, Oxford

Academic work
- Institutions: Royal Holloway College, London; Somerville College, Oxford

Margaret Hayes-Robinson (7 April 1876 – 1930) was a British historian and university teacher. She served as the first head of Royal Holloway College's history department between 1899 and 1911 and as a tutor at Somerville College, Oxford from 1911 to 1916.

== Early life and education ==
Margaret Hayes Robinson was born on 7 April 1876, to Reverend Richard Hayes Robinson of Bath, Somerset and his wife Isabel, née Moser. Her father was in charge of the Octagon Chapel, Bath and from 1884 the incumbent of St. German's, Blackheath. He also wrote hymns, including Holy Father, cheer our way.

Hayes-Robinson was educated at Cheltenham Ladies' College in Gloucestershire. She studied at St Hilda's Hall, Oxford, from 1895 to 1898 and achieved a first class degree in Modern History. St Hilda's had been founded in 1893 by the headmistress of Cheltenham Ladies' College to educate teachers and former pupils from the school. During her time at Oxford, she won the Margaret Evans History Prize for 1896 of £5 in books.

== Career ==
In 1899, shortly after graduating, Hayes-Robinson was appointed as the Vice-Principal of St.Hugh's College, Oxford. She was also college librarian for a term. Later that year, she took up the position of Head of History at Royal Holloway College, where her students included Helen Cam and Fanny Street. Hayes-Robinson has been identified as the original of Miss Adam, a character in Ivy Compton-Burnett's first novel, Dolores (1911).

In 1911, Hayes-Robinson was recruited as a tutor to Somerville College, Oxford by Emily Penrose and stayed until 1916.

Notable tutees include Evelyn Procter and Vera Brittain. Brittain acknowledged Hayes-Robinson in her war diary, Chronicle of Youth.

== After Oxford ==
After her time as a student, Hayes-Robinson became a founding member of a society of old students of St Hilda's College, Oxford. She was the first ex-student to then sit on the council of the college.

In 1916, Margaret Hayes-Robinson married Kenneth Leys, a fellow of University College, Oxford. They had one daughter. During this time, Hayes-Robinson was working for the War Trade Department of the Board of Trade.

== Death ==
In 1930, Hayes-Robinson was hit by a car while cycling in Holywell Street, Oxford, and died soon after from her injuries.

== Hayes-Robinson Lecture ==
Each year since 1992, a lecture series has been held in her honour and guest speakers have included notable historians Richard Overy, Peter Frankopan, Owlen Hufton and Linda Colley. The lecture series is part of the terms of a benefaction made to the department of History at Royal Holloway, University of London.
