= Lucy Sutherland =

British historian and educator (1903–1980)

Dame Lucy Sutherland DBE FBA FRSA
- Born: Lucy Stuart Sutherland; 21 June 1903; Geelong, Australia
- Died: 20 August 1980 (aged 77); Oxford, Oxfordshire, England, UK
- Occupations: Historian and academic
- Board member of: Girls' Public Day School Trust

Academic background
- Education: Roedean School
- Alma mater: University of the Witwatersrand; Somerville College, Oxford

Academic work
- Discipline: History
- Sub-discipline: Political history; Economic history; Business history; History of London; Georgian era
- Institutions: Somerville College, Oxford; Lady Margaret Hall, Oxford
- Doctoral students: Paul Langford

Dame Lucy Stuart Sutherland DBE FBA FRSA (21 June 1903 – 20 August 1980) was an Australian-born British historian and head of Lady Margaret Hall, Oxford.

== Career ==
Sutherland was born in Geelong, Australia, but brought up in South Africa where she attended Roedean School in Johannesburg, then the University of the Witwatersrand, where she studied history under Professor William Macmillan. She graduated with first-class honours in 1924, then was elected as the Herbert Ainsworth research scholar for a year.

She then moved to read modern history at Somerville College, Oxford, where she again achieved first class honours. In 1926 she was the first woman undergraduate to speak at the Oxford Union, winning applause for her opposition to the motion 'That the women's colleges ... should be levelled to the ground'. After she graduated Somerville appointed her a tutor, and later elected her to a tutorial fellowship in Economic History and Politics (1928–45). She was principal of Lady Margaret Hall, Oxford, 1945–71. She was a pro-vice-chancellor of the University 1961–69, the first woman to hold that office.

At a time when the women's societies were advancing towards the full collegiate status finally accorded them in 1960, it was of immense benefit to the Hall to have at its head a woman of Miss Sutherland's statesmanlike vision. Her wisdom and far-sightedness, her clear understanding of financial matters, her business-like handling of committees, her vigorous realism, tempered by discretion, all combined to make her an ideal chairman. ... By virtue of her personality, no less than of her gifts as scholar and administrator, she was outstanding among the academic women of her generation.

— Obituary, The Times

In parallel with her academic work, Sutherland also became involved in government administration. In 1941 she was offered a principalship at the Board of Trade, and by 1945 had the rank of assistant secretary. After the war she chaired a Board of Trade working party on the lace industry (1946), and was on a committee of inquiry into the film industry (1949), a royal commission on taxation of profits and income (1951), a committee on grants for students (1958), and the University Grants Committee (1964–99). She was also involved with educational administration and was chair of the Girls' Public Day School Trust. She left an art collection to LMH on her death.

== Publications ==
- A London merchant, 1695–1774 : A study in economic history based on the papers of William Braund, 1933
- The law merchant in England in the seventeenth and eighteenth centuries" in Transactions of the Royal Historical Society 17, 1934
- The use of business records in the study of history, 1935
- The East India Company in Eighteenth-Century Politics, 1952
- The city of London and the Devonshire-Pitt administration : 1756–7, 1960
- Fourteenth century studies by Maude Violet Clarke, ed. L. S. Sutherland & M. McKisack, 1967
- Edmund Burke and the relations between Members of Parliament and their constituents : an examination of the eighteenth-century theory and practice in international relations, 1968

== Honours ==
- Commander of the Order of the British Empire (CBE), 1947 King's Birthday Honours
- Honorary LittD, Cambridge University, 1963
- Honorary LLD, Smith College, Northampton, Mass., 1964
- Foreign Honorary Member, American Academy of Arts and Sciences, 1965
- Honorary DLitt, Glasgow University, 1966
- Honorary LittD, University of Kent, 1967
- Honorary DLitt, Keele University, 1968
- Dame Commander of the Order of the British Empire (DBE), 1969 New Year Honours
- Honorary DLit, Belfast University, 1970
- Honorary Fellow, Lady Margaret Hall, Oxford, 1971
- Honorary DCL, Oxford University, 1972

== Sources ==
- SUTHERLAND, Dame Lucy Stuart, Who Was Who, A & C Black, 1920–2016 (online edition, Oxford University Press, 2014)
- Whiteman, Anne. "Sutherland, Dame Lucy Stuart (1903–1980)". Oxford Dictionary of National Biography (online ed.). Oxford University Press. doi:10.1093/ref:odnb/31738. (Subscription, Wikipedia Library access or UK public library membership required.)
- Obituary, The Times, London, 21 August 1980, page 12

Academic offices
Preceded by Lynda Grier	Principal of Lady Margaret Hall, Oxford; 1945-71	Succeeded by Sally Chilver
