= Marjorie Williamson =

English physicist (1913–2002)

Dame Elsie Marjorie Williamson, DBE (30 July 1913, Wakefield, Yorkshire, England – 12 August 2002 Lower Raydon, Suffolk) was a British academic, educator, physicist and university administrator.

== Education ==
The only child of middle-aged parents she attended Wakefield Girls' High School and went up to read physics at Royal Holloway College, University of London (RHC) in 1932, graduating in 1936.

== Early career ==
She stayed at Royal Holloway as a Demonstrator in physics, before spending the Second World War years lecturing at the University College of Wales in Aberystwyth (now Aberystwyth University).

In 1945, she moved to Bedford College, London, as a lecturer in physics. She spent 10 years there, gaining her PhD and working in the fields of relativity, quantum mechanics and electromagnetic theory. At Bedford she was involved not only in the physics department, but took a great interest in the administration of the college.

In 1955 she was appointed Principal of St Mary's College, Durham.

== Royal Holloway ==
She was invited to become Principal of Royal Holloway College, University of London, (RHC) in 1962 following the resignation of Dr Edith Clara Batho. Before Williamson became Principal, RHC admitted only women as undergraduates and offered a relatively restricted number of courses. Men were only admitted as postgraduates after 1945. Because of this, and its situation in the outer London suburb of Englefield Green, Surrey, the RHC was seen as something of a backwater.

Williamson set out to change this image by admitting men undergraduates and by a comprehensive expansion into new buildings and academic disciplines. She provided a new Students' Union building and revived the religious life of the college by the appointment of four honorary chaplains.

By the time she retired as Principal in 1973, the college had admitted men as undergraduates since 1965 and expanded into new buildings, and staff had been recruited for new departments such as biochemistry, statistics, computer science and music.

She was appointed DBE on her retirement in 1973. Lionel Butler was her successor.

== Personal life ==
On leaving Royal Holloway, Williamson moved to a small village in Warwickshire, where she acted as a volunteer for the National Trust at nearby Charlecote Park. She moved again in 1985 to a converted barn in Suffolk, near a lifelong friend, Ann Thomson, also a graduate of Royal Holloway. She died in 2002.

== Commemoration ==
On 28 August 2019, a blue plaque will be unveiled in Dame Marjorie's honour by Wakefield's Forgotten Women project in conjunction with Wakefield Civic Society as part of the city's Festival of the Moon, celebrating the 50th anniversary of the 1969 lunar landing. The Forgotten Women scheme will also honour her achievements by bringing her story to life in a series of performances of a piece entitled Professor Quantum by Wakefield College students.

Academic offices
Preceded by Dr Edith Clara Batho	Principal; Royal Holloway College; University of London; 1962-1973	Succeeded by Dr Lionel Harry Butler
