= Carol Townend =

British writer

Carol Townend (born 1953) is an English writer of historical romances, generally set in England and Europe. Her first novel won the Romantic Novelists' Association New Writer's Award. She has also published a number of articles with Writing Magazine and Writers' News.

== Biography ==
Born in Harrogate, Yorkshire, England, Carol Townend was educated in Whitby by Anglican nuns. She read History at Royal Holloway College. Her first novel, set in 11th century England and published by Mills & Boon, won the RNA New Writers' Award in 1989. Betrothed to the Barbarian, the final book in her Byzantine trilogy, was shortlisted for the 2013 RoNA Rose Award and Unveiling Lady Clare was shortlisted for the 2015 RoNA Rose Award. Carol lives in London with her husband and daughter.

== Bibliography ==
=== Fiction by publication date ===
- The Love Child Fights Back (2025) Independently Published
- A Knight for the Runaway Nun (2023) Harlequin Mills & Boon
- A Knight for the Defiant Lady (2023) Harlequin Mills & Boon
- The Warrior's Princess Prize (2020) Harlequin Mills & Boon
- The Princess's Secret Longing (2019) Harlequin Mills & Boon
- The Knight's Forbidden Princess (2018) Harlequin Mills & Boon
- Mistaken for a Lady (2016) Harlequin Mills & Boon
- Lady Rowena's Ruin (2015) Harlequin Mills & Boon
- Lord Gawain's Forbidden Mistress (2015) Harlequin Mills & Boon
- Unveiling Lady Clare (2014) Harlequin Mills & Boon
- Lady Isobel's Champion (2013) Harlequin Mills & Boon
- Betrothed to the Barbarian (2012) Harlequin Mills & Boon
- Chained to the Barbarian (2012) Harlequin Mills & Boon
- Bound to the Barbarian (2010) Harlequin Mills & Boon
- Her Banished Lord (2010) Harlequin Mills & Boon
- Runaway Lady, Conquering Lord (2009) Harlequin Mills & Boon
- His Captive Lady (2008) Harlequin Mills & Boon
- An Honorable Rogue (2008) Harlequin Mills & Boon
- The Novice Bride (2007) Harlequin Mills & Boon
- Blackthorn Winter (1993) Hodder Headline
- The Stone Rose (1992) Hodder Headline
- Leaves on the Wind (1990) Mills & Boon Masquerade
- Sapphire in the Snow (1989) (Winner of RNA New Writers' Award) Mills & Boon Masquerade
- Shattered Vows (1989) Mills & Boon Masquerade

=== Fiction by series ===
Convent Brides:

- A Knight for the Defiant Lady (2023) Harlequin Mills & Boon
- A Knight for the Runaway Nun (2023) Harlequin Mills & Boon

Princesses of the Alhambra:

- The Knight's Forbidden Princess (2018) Harlequin Mills & Boon
- The Princess's Secret Longing (2019) Harlequin Mills & Boon
- The Warrior's Princess Prize (2020) Harlequin Mills & Boon

The Knights of Champagne:

- Lady Isobel's Champion (2013) Harlequin Mills & Boon
- Unveiling Lady Clare (2013) Harlequin Mills & Boon
- Lord Gawain's Forbidden Mistress (2015) Harlequin Mills & Boon
- Lady Rowena's Ruin (2015) Harlequin Mills & Boon
- Mistaken for a Lady (2016) Harlequin Mills & Boon

Palace Brides:

- Bound to the Barbarian (2010) Harlequin Mills & Boon
- Chained to the Barbarian (2012) Harlequin Mills & Boon
- Betrothed to the Barbarian (2012) Harlequin Mills & Boon

Wessex Weddings:

- The Novice Bride (2007) Harlequin Mills & Boon
- An Honorable Rogue (2008) Harlequin Mills & Boon
- His Captive Lady (2008) Harlequin Mills & Boon
- Runaway Lady, Conquering Lord (2009) Harlequin Mills & Boon
- Her Banished Lord (2010) Harlequin Mills & Boon

The Herevi Sagas:

- The Stone Rose (1992) Hodder Headline
- Blackthorn Winter (1993) Hodder Headline

Stand Alone Novels:

- Shattered Vows (1989) Mills & Boon Masquerade
- Sapphire in the Snow (1989) Mills & Boon Masquerade
- Leaves on the Wind (1990) Mills & Boon Masquerade

=== Non-fiction ===
- Royal Russia (1995) Smith Gryphon, (reprinted by John Blake Publishing 2006)
