= Burnside Symphony Orchestra =

- Orchestra
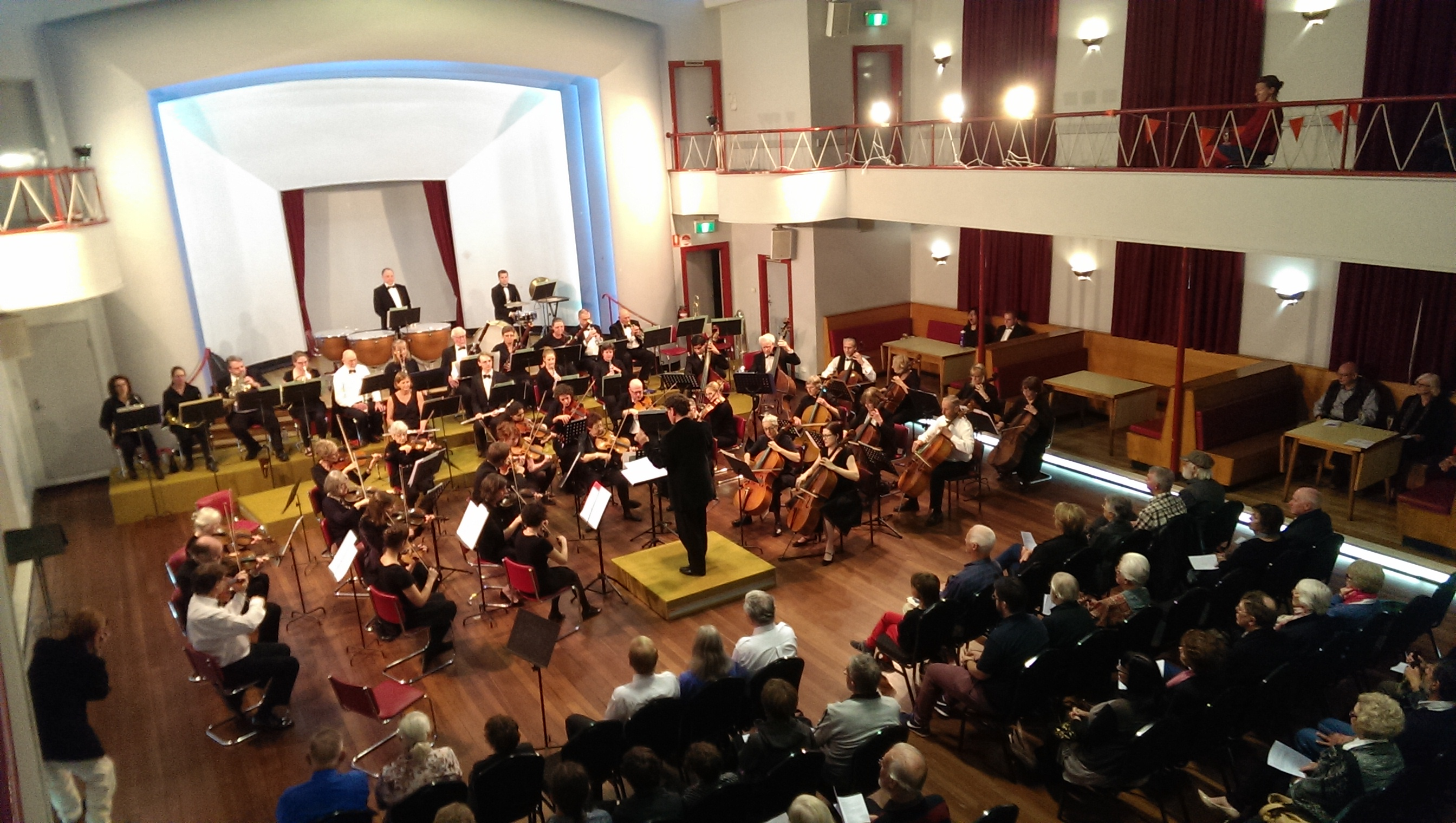
- Burnside Symphony Orchestra Concert 15 April 2015, Burnside Ballroom, Tusmore, South Australia
- Founded: 1956
- Website: www.bso.org.au

The Burnside Symphony Orchestra is a community orchestra based in the Burnside Council area in Adelaide, South Australia. While most concerts presented are in the Burnside Ballroom, the orchestra sometimes repeats performances outside the Adelaide metropolitan area, offering rural towns the chance to hear live performances of popular classical music.

== History ==
The orchestra was formed in 1956 to encourage amateur musicians, aspiring soloists and conductors to gain experience in performing symphonic repertoire with a full orchestra.

Its main instigator was Dr John Nicholson Black, a flautist and conductor who, while originating from the UK, was residing and working in Adelaide as Senior Agronomist at the Waite Institute. The orchestra rehearsed during its earliest days in Clayton Church Hall before finding a permanent home in the Burnside Town Hall. The City of Burnside supported the orchestra at this time and has continued to do so throughout its history.

== Concerts ==
The orchestra presents four concerts each year and performs some programs both at its home venue, the Burnside Ballroom, and at various country venues including Tanunda in the Barossa Valley. Most concerts are presented in support of a local or international charity. Charities have included Save the Children, Burnside Rotary, Royal District Nursing Society and Sailability.

== Conductors ==
The orchestra's inaugural conductor was Dr John Black (1957-1963). The current musical director is Philip Paine. Past conductors have included Malcolm John, David Cubbin, Bob Cooper, Jim Ferguson, Alfonse Anthony, Joanna Drimatis, Martin Butler, Bruce Stewart, Kim Worley and Bryan Griffiths.

== Commissions ==
In 1986 the Burnside Symphony Orchestra commissioned The Christmas kangaroo : a children's story for narrator and orchestra with words by Ian Mudie and music by Peter Webb.
