= Roy Miller (academic) =

British physicist (1935–2021)

Roy Frank Miller (1935 – 25 December 2021) was a British academic, educator, physicist and university administrator. He was the Principal of Royal Holloway College of the University of London from 1982 to 1985.

== Early life and education ==
Miller was born in 1935, and educated at Wembley County Grammar School. In 1957, he completed a BSc (Hons) degree in physics as an external student at the University College of South-West England (now the University of Exeter). He then completed a PhD in 1962 at Royal Holloway College under the supervision of Samuel Tolansky in 1962.

== Career ==
After completing his PhD, Miller remained at Royal Holloway College as a demonstrator and progressed to become a senior lecturer in physics by 1973. Up until 1965, the college admitted only female students as undergraduates (with the only male students being postgraduates). When male undergraduates were admitted for the first time in 1965, Miller became the Warden of the men's hall of residence, Kingswood Hall, located in Coopers Hill Lane, Englefield Green (one mile away from the college's main campus).

In 1976, Miller became Vice-Principal of the college, working under Dr Lionel Butler, who had been appointed the college's first male principal in 1973.

In 1970, the University of London had set up a committee of enquiry into the governance of the university, chaired by Lord Murray of Newhaven with appointments by the university and the University Grants Committee. The Murray Report, which covered all 34 constituent schools of the university, proposed "some kind of amalgamation" for Royal Holloway College, citing reasons of economy. By 1975–76, the cuts had begun to threaten the quality of teaching and research as well as the infrastructure. The incoming Conservative government of 1979 cut another 14-15% from universities' budgets. This forced a reduction in staff of about 15% at Royal Holloway in 1981. The college senior academics also concluded that the college could not survive alone, nor cover the existing academic range with reduced staff, and needed to combine with another of the university's smaller colleges.

In the middle of this and before anything was finalised, Butler died suddenly on 26 November 1981. Miller assumed authority in his capacity as Vice-Principal, later made Acting Principal, and officially became the Principal in 1982. Following suggestions from the University of London's Vice-Chancellor, discussions took place in February 1982 between Miller and Professor Dorothy Wedderburn, the Principal of Bedford College (another University of London College), about the possibility of a merger with Bedford College leaving its site in Regent's Park in central London and moving to Royal Holloway's site at Egham. Bedford had no other option as the university had decided that teaching and research in science should be concentrated on five sites, of which Royal Holloway was one. The Bedford site was also land-locked with a limited lease, so growth at Bedford would have been virtually impossible. On 26 July 1982, the council chairs of both colleges signed an agreement to merge. Royal Holloway and Bedford New College (RHBNC) was created by Act of Parliament on 1 August 1985 with Professor Wedderburn as its first principal and Miller as Vice-Principal. "Royal Holloway and Bedford New College" remains the official name of the college, but for day-to-day use the college is now generally known as "Royal Holloway, University of London" (RHUL or RHC).

== Personal life and death ==
In 1961, Miller married Ruth Naomi Kenchington, a former student and postgraduate at Royal Holloway College. The couple had one son, and four grandchildren. He died on 25 December 2021, at the age of 86.

Academic offices
Preceded by Lionel Harry Butler	Principal of Royal Holloway College; University of London; 1982–1985	Succeeded by Dorothy Wedderburn (as Principal of Royal Holloway and Bedford New College)
