= Janet Ruth Bacon =

Janet Bacon
- Born: 26 October 1891; Oxford, England
- Died: 25 January 1965 (aged 73); Oxford, England
- Title: Principal, Royal Holloway College
- Parent(s): Richard Bacon, Fanny Gray

Academic background
- Education: Oxford High School
- Alma mater: Girton College, Cambridge

Academic work
- Discipline: Classicist
- Institutions: Girton College, Cambridge; Royal Holloway College, University of London
- Notable works: The Voyage of the Argonauts (1925)

Janet Ruth Bacon (26 October 1891 – 25 January 1965) was Principal of Royal Holloway College, University of London from 1935 to 1944.

== Early life and education ==
Bacon was born on 26 October 1891 in Oxford, Oxfordshire, the daughter of a barrister. She was educated at Oxford High School, a private school in the city. She studied the Classical Tripos at Girton College, Cambridge, sitting Part I in 1915 and Part II in 1916: women were not allowed to graduate from the University of Cambridge with degrees until 1948.

== Career ==
She first taught at King Edward VI High School for Girls in Birmingham during the First World War. She then was a lecturer in classics at Girton College, Cambridge from 1919, and Director of Studies in classics there from 1925 to 1935. In 1925, she published The Voyage of the Argonauts, an authority on the subject. She was appointed as Principal of Royal Holloway College unanimously by the governors as successor to Ellen Charlotte Higgins. The 50th anniversary of the college opening was celebrated in her tenure with a visit from Queen Mary. This was in 1937 as King George V had died in 1936 the anniversary year, a year of royal mourning.

During the 1940s she was instrumental in protecting Royal Holloway's Victorian art collection, donated by founder Thomas Holloway. As principal, she opposed the recommendation of a college committee that wanted to dispose of or give away much of the collection, at a time when Victorian art was considered of poor quality.

She was principal during the Second World War when part of the college was occupied by the women's ATS Officer Cadets' Training Unit (OCTU). The stress of war-time forced her to resign on the grounds of ill-health but it was clear that she understood she had failed. One of her last responsibilities was as a member of the Post-War Policy Committee of the college. She disagreed with the majority on the committee and her failure to convince her colleagues added to her sense of failure as principal. One of the proposals agreed was an intention for Royal Holloway College to become co-educational. This later began in 1945 with the admission of men postgraduates and then in 1965 with male undergraduates. She was succeeded in the last year of war by Miss Fanny Street as Acting Principal.

== See also ==
- Golden Fleece

Academic offices
Preceded by Ellen Charlotte Higgins	Principal; Royal Holloway College; University of London; 1935 -1944	Succeeded by Fanny Street (Acting Principal)
