= Glen Cowan =

- Citizenship: American
- Education: University of California, Berkeley
- Scientific career
- Fields: Particle Physics and Statistics
- Workplaces: UCLA, University of California, Berkeley, Max Planck Institute for Physics, University of Siegen, CERN, Royal Holloway University of London

Glen Cowan is a professor of Particle Physics at Royal Holloway, University of London. He has made a considerable contribution to the ATLAS experiment at the Large Hadron Collider.

== Education ==
Cowan obtained a Bachelor of Science in physics in 1981 from UCLA. In 1988 he completed his PhD at UC Berkeley where he focused his research on the TPC/Two-Gamma Experiment.

== Career ==
Cowan was a postdoctoral researcher from 1988 to 1992 at the Max Planck Institute for Physics in Munich and at the University of Siegen. At both institutes he worked on the ALEPH experiment and Large Electron–Positron Collider at CERN. He joined the Royal Holloway academic staff in 1998. Cowan writes the statistics chapter of the Particle Data Group.

== Research ==
Cowan is involved with analysing data and developing software for the ATLAS experiment at the LHC. He is also involved in searching for physics beyond the standard model, such as Supersymmetry.
