= Geraldine Emma May Jebb =

British university administrator

Geraldine Emma May Jebb CBE (1886 – 28 December 1959), known as Gem Jebb, was the daughter of Heneage Horsley Jebb and Geraldine Croker Russell. The Jebbs were a distinguished Irish family, prominent in both the Church of Ireland and the legal profession: her paternal grandparents were Robert Jebb QC and Harriet Horsley, a descendant of Bishop Samuel Horsley. Her mother was a daughter of John Russell, Archdeacon of Clogher and his wife Frances Story. She was the Principal of Bedford College, University of London, from 1930 to 1951, the first higher education women's college in the United Kingdom. She was unmarried.

== Education ==
Jebb was educated at Newnham College, Cambridge taking the Economics Tripos although women were not awarded degrees at Cambridge until 1948.

== Career ==
Jebb worked in the Civil Service from 1913 to 1917 in the Department of the Ministry of Labour.

=== Academia ===
Jebb then became Director of Studies and Lecturer on Economics at Newnham from 1917 to 1919 and from 1919 to 1929 a lecturer on Economics at Armstrong College, now Newcastle University but then part of the University of Durham.

In 1930 she was appointed Principal of Bedford College and retired in 1951. During this period, Jebb represented the college on the Management Committee for the Florence Nightingale Foundation (FNF), a charity organisation that provides scholarships to health professionals in the UK.

She was appointed CBE in 1951.

== Relations ==
Jebb's sister, Eglantyne Mary Jebb (1889–1978), was Principal of the Froebel Educational Institute (now Froebel College, Roehampton University), Roehampton, London (1932–55).

Her cousin, Eglantyne Jebb (1876–1928), founded the charity Save the Children.

Academic offices
Preceded by Dame Margaret Jansen Tuke	Principal; Bedford College; University of London; 1930-1951	Succeeded by Norah Lillian Penston
