= Norman Gowar =

Professor Norman William Gowar (born 7 December 1940) is an academic from the United Kingdom who served as the Principal of Royal Holloway, University of London, from 1990 to 2000. Prior to that he had served as Deputy Vice-Chancellor of the Open University.

== Education ==
Gowar was educated at Sir George Monoux Grammar School in east London and City University in central London.

== Career ==
After a period working with English Electric, Gowar was appointed as a Lecturer in Mathematics at City University in 1963.

In 1969, Gowar became a founder member of the Open University. The first course broadcast by the university in 1971 was an introduction to the mathematics foundation course presented by Gowar. He subsequently became the Open University's Deputy Vice-Chancellor.

In 1990, Gowar became the Principal of Royal Holloway and Bedford New College. (The college was formed as a merger of Royal Holloway College and Bedford College in 1985. During the period when Gowar was Principal, the college adopted the name 'Royal Holloway, University of London'.)

Gowar was a member of the Fulbright Commission from 2001 to 2005.

== Personal life ==
Gowar's first marriage was in 1963 to Diane May Parker, with whom he had one son and one daughter. His second marriage was in 1981 to Professor Judith Margaret Greene (a daughter of Patrick Gordon-Walker).

Academic offices
Preceded by Professor Dorothy Wedderburn	Principal; Royal Holloway, University of London; 1990-2000	Succeeded by Sir Drummond Bone
