= Keith Murray, Baron Murray of Newhaven =

British academic (1903–1993)

The Right Honourable The Lord Murray of Newhaven
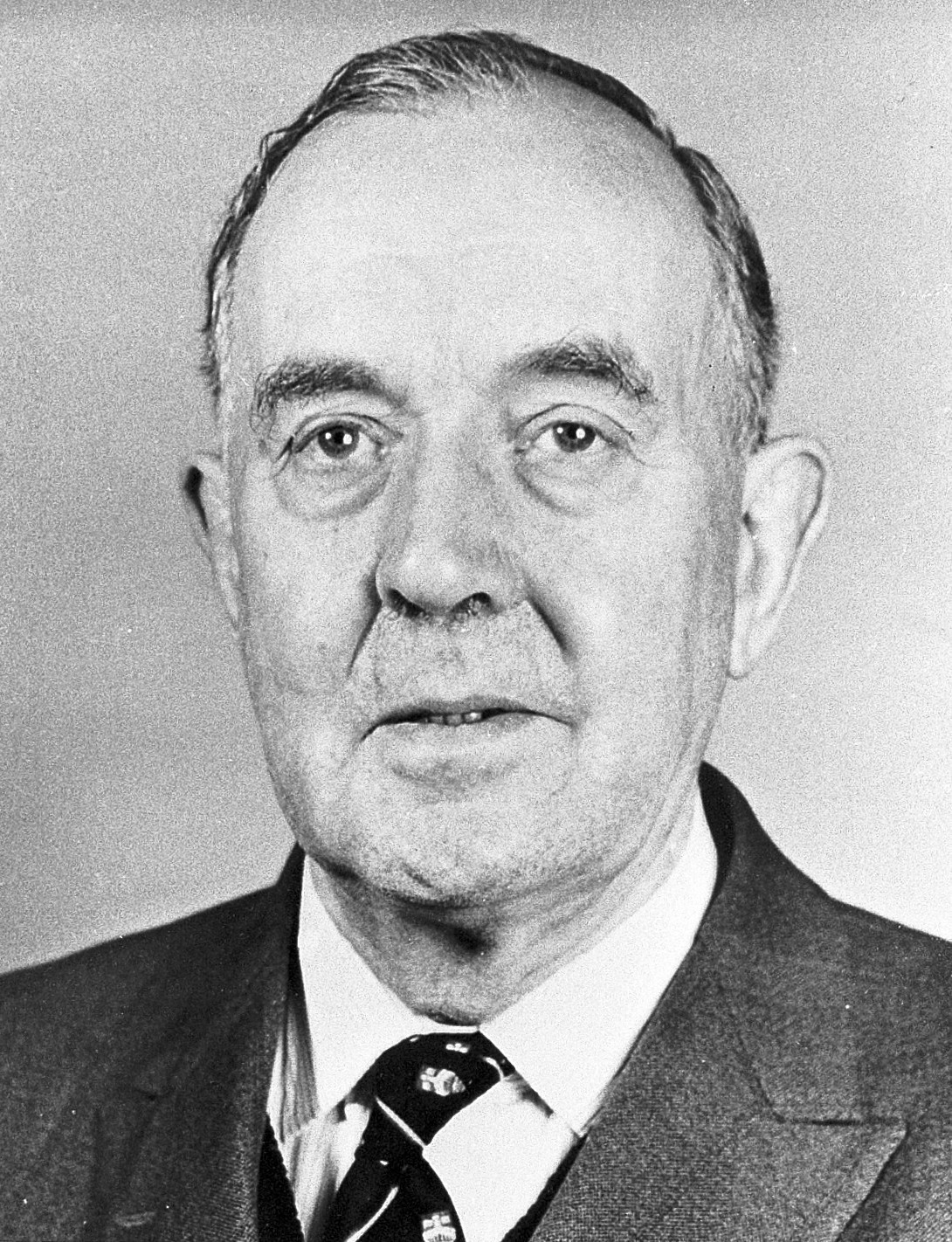
- Born: 28 July 1903; Edinburgh, Scotland
- Died: 10 October 1993, aged 90; London, UK
- Education: Edinburgh Academy University of Edinburgh Cornell University

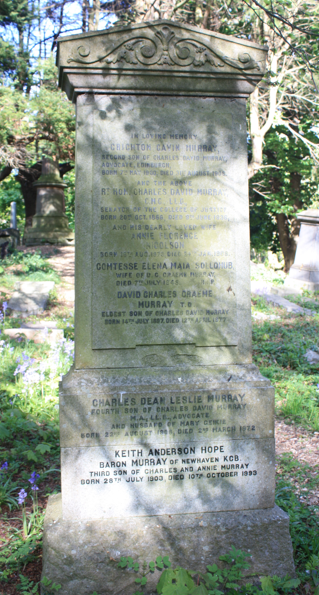
The grave of Keith Murray, Baron Murray, Warriston Cemetery

Keith Anderson Hope Murray, Baron Murray of Newhaven, KCB (28 July 1903 – 10 October 1993) was a British academic and rector of Lincoln College, Oxford.

== Early life ==
He was the son of Lord Murray, a Senator of the College of Justice, and his wife Annie Florence Nicolson.

Educated at Edinburgh Academy and the University of Edinburgh where he gained a BSc in Agriculture, Murray went into employment with the Ministry of Agriculture from 1925 to 1926. He was then awarded a Commonwealth Fund Fellowship, and spent three years at Cornell University where he was awarded a PhD.

In 1929 he attended Oriel College, Oxford, and the Agricultural Economics Research Institute (AERI) until 1932.

He died on 10 October 1993 and is buried with his parents and siblings in Warriston Cemetery in north Edinburgh.

== Career ==
He became a research officer for the AERI, a post he held until 1944. In 1937, however, he was appointed a fellow and bursar of Lincoln College, Oxford, as well as being appointed by the University to Oxford City Council. On the death of the rector J. A. R. Munro in 1944, he was elected to the rectorship, a position he held until his retirement in 1953. He became the first rector since Nathaniel Crew not to die in office.

On his retirement from the rectorship, Rab Butler, the then-Chancellor of the Exchequer, appointed him chairman of the University Grants Committee, a post he held for a decade.

In 1957, Sir Robert Menzies, the Australian Prime Minister, asked him to serve on the Committee on Australian Universities. He was appointed a Knight Commander of the Order of the Bath (KCB) in the 1963 New Year Honours. He was vice president of Wellington College (1966–69) and honorary president of the National Union of Students (1967–70).

He was chairman of the Committee of Enquiry into the Governance of the University of London (1970–72) which produced the Murray Report. This led to the merger of several of the constituent colleges of the university such as Royal Holloway College and Bedford College under the leadership of their principals Dr Roy Miller and Professor Dorothy Wedderburn.

He was chancellor of Southampton University from 1964 to 1974.

He was chairman of the Royal Commission for the Exhibition of 1851 (1962–71).

He held honorary fellowships of Downing College, Cambridge, Oriel College, Oxford, Birkbeck College, London, and Lincoln College, Oxford. On 17 September 1964, he was created a life peer as Baron Murray of Newhaven, of Newhaven in the County and City of Edinburgh.

The Keith Murray Senior Scholarship at Lincoln College is named in his memory.

== Arms ==
Coat of arms of Keith Murray, Baron Murray of Newhaven

Crest
A Demi-Savage proper wreathed about the temples with Juniper holding in his dexter hand the arm extended an Open Book proper Binding and Fore Edges Gules and holding in his sinister hand a Key Azure
Escutcheon
Azure on a Fess wavy Argent between three Mullets twp in chief and one pierced of the field in base and in centre chief issuant from the fess a Three-Masted Ship under full sail of the second a Bar wavy of the first a Bordure Argent for difference
Supporters
Dexter: a Newhaven Fishwife her Creel on her back Basket Or with fish Argent supported by a Band Sable about her forehead her Corsage and Over-Kirtle of Azure pinned up her First Under-Petticoat striped Argent and Azure her Second Under-Petticoat striped Brown and Primrose both pinned up her Third Under-Petticoat striped White and Gules Hose Argent and Shoe Sable buckled Argent; Sinister: a Stag proper attired Sable gorged of a Collar embattled Argent masoned Sable
Motto
Lairnin Files The Fetters

Academic offices
Preceded by J. A. R. Munro	Rector of Lincoln College, Oxford; 1944–1953	Succeeded by Sir Walter Fraser Oakeshott
