= John Nicholson Black =

John Nicholson Black FRSE (28 June 1922 – 6 October 2018) was Principal of Bedford College, London from 1971-81.

== Education ==
John Nicholson Black was educated at Rugby School and Exeter College, Oxford.

== Career ==
He did war service with the RAF from 1942–46 and then obtained a BA in agriculture at Exeter College, Oxford in 1949 followed by an MA and DPhil both in 1952. From 1952-63 he was a lecturer, senior lecturer and Reader at the University of Adelaide Waite Research Institute where he was awarded a DSc in 1965. Black was also an accomplished musician and while residing in Adelaide he established the Burnside Symphony Orchestra, then comprising both professional and amateur musicians. He led the orchestra from 1957-1963.

He was Professor of Forestry and Natural Resources at the University of Edinburgh from 1963–71 before becoming Principal of Bedford College.

Bedford came under considerable financial pressure in the 1970s from cuts in grants and the limitations of the college site in Regent's Park. The college was slow in responding to the challenge and Black's efforts to persuade the college to a merger especially with Royal Holloway College 'fell on stony ground'. Black came from one of the largest universities in the United Kingdom and: "...was well aware that a college of only eleven hundred students with grant/fee income to match could not be expected to support as many as twenty academic departments in a wide spread of disciplines, especially at a time when public funding was seriously reduced." The inevitable merger came under the next principal (Dorothy Wedderburn)'s leadership.

== Personal life ==
He married, first, in 1952 Mary Denise Webb (died 1966) with whom he had a daughter and a son. He married, second, in 1967 Wendy Marjorie Waterston with whom he has two sons.

He died on 6 October 2018 at the age of 96.

== Notes ==
Academic offices
Preceded by Elizabeth Millicent Chilver	Principal; Bedford College, London; 1971-81	Succeeded by Dorothy Wedderburn
