= Norah Lillian Penston =

British botanist and academic administrator

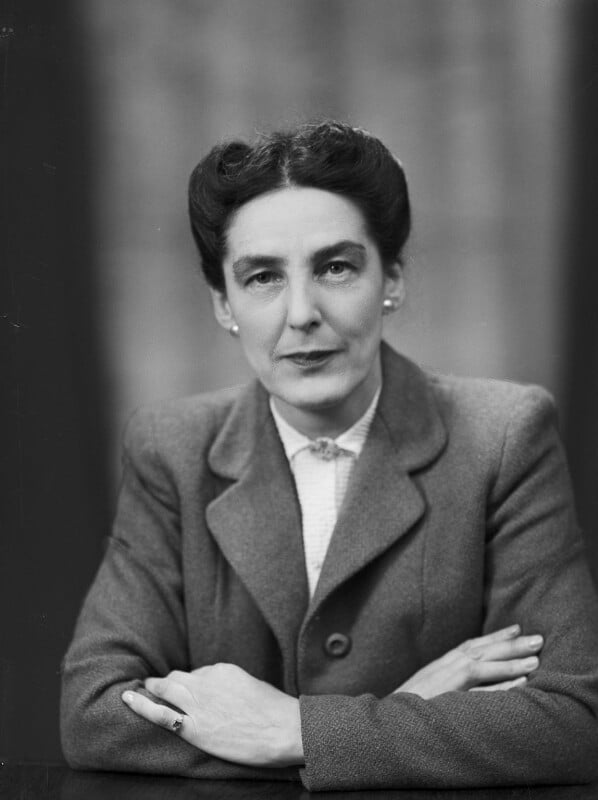
Penston in 1951

Norah Lillian Penston (20 August 1903 – 1 February 1974) was a British botanist and academic administrator. She was principal of Bedford College, University of London, from 1951 to 1964. Penston published on the importance of mineral elements to plant physiology.

== Early life and education ==
Norah Lillian Penston was the daughter of A. J. Penston, and was born 20 August 1903. She was educated at the Bolton School and St Anne's College, Oxford where she obtained a BA in botany with first class honours in 1927. She studied under W. O. James, researching the potassium nutrition of potatoes for her DPhil, which she gained in 1930.

== Career ==
Penston was demonstrator in Botany at Oxford in 1928–29. She then moved to King's College London, where she was assistant lecturer from 1933 to 1936 and lecturer from 1936 to 1945. From 1940 to 1944 she served as acting head of Botany at King's College. In 1945 she became the first woman to be vice-principal of Wye College, part of the University of London, following its amalgamation with Swanley Horticultural College. She was also head of biological sciences department at Wye from 1947 to 1951. Appointed Principal of Bedford College in 1951, she remained there until her retirement in 1964, when she was succeeded by anthropologist Elizabeth Cheever. Throughout her career she maintained teaching responsibilities, lecturing on mineral nutrition of plants and plant anatomy. Her research interest was in the importance of mineral elements to plant physiology, and she published a number of papers.

Penston was a member of the Senate of the University of London and on the council of several academic institutions. She was unmarried, and died on 1 February 1974.

Academic offices
Preceded by Geraldine Emma May Jebb	Principal of Bedford College; University of London; 1952-1964	Succeeded by Elizabeth Millicent Chilver
