= Drummond Bone =

British academic administrator

Sir James Drummond Bone FRSA FRSE

Master of Balliol College, Oxford
- In office October 2011 – 3 April 2018
- Preceded by: Andrew Graham
- Succeeded by: Helen Ghosh

Principal of Royal Holloway, University of London
- In office 2000–2002
- Preceded by: Professor Norman Gowar
- Succeeded by: Professor Stephen Hill

Vice-Chancellor of the University of Liverpool
- In office 2002–2008
- Chancellor: The Lord Owen
- Succeeded by: Sir Howard Newby

President of Universities UK
- In office 2005–2007
- Preceded by: Professor Sir Ivor Crewe (University of Essex)
- Succeeded by: Professor Sir Rick Trainor (King's College London)

Personal details
- Born: 1947 (age 78–79) Ayrshire, Scotland
- Spouse(s): Vivian, Lady Drummond Bone
- Education: University of Glasgow; Balliol College, Oxford
- Profession: Byronist

Sir James Drummond Bone, FRSE, FRSA (born 11 July 1947), is a Byron scholar and was Master of Balliol College at the University of Oxford until April 2018. He previously served as Vice-Chancellor of the University of Liverpool from 2002 to 2008, and Principal of Royal Holloway, University of London, from 2000 to 2002.Currently residing in Fife, Scotland.

== Education ==
Bone attended Ayr Academy, a non-denominational secondary school, followed by the University of Glasgow, where he obtained an MA in 1968 and won a Snell Exhibition to study at Balliol College, Oxford from 1968 to 1972.

== Career ==
Bone is a specialist on the works of Romantic poet Lord Byron, and on leaving Oxford in 1972 became lecturer in English and Comparative Literature at the University of Warwick. He returned to the University of Glasgow in 1980 as a lecturer in English Literature, becoming a Senior Lecturer in 1989 and titular Professor in 1995. From 1991 to 1995, he was Dean of the Faculty of Arts, and in 1995 became Vice-Principal.

In 2000, he left Glasgow to become Principal of Royal Holloway, University of London, and Pro-Vice-Chancellor of the University of London, and in 2002 became Vice Chancellor of the University of Liverpool. Although head of the university, he continued to teach an undergraduate class on Byron, and was also chairman of the Liverpool Culture Company, directing the city's preparations to be European Capital of Culture in 2008. He also served as President of Universities UK, a committee of university heads, from 2005 to 2007. He retired from Liverpool in 2008, and from October 2011 became Master of Balliol College, Oxford.

He is an acknowledged expert on Lord Byron's work and is Vice-President of the Byron Society. He was editor of The Byron Journal from 1978 to 1988 and has been co-editor of journal Romanticism since 1995. He is a member of the Steering Group of the Council for College and University English, a Fellow of the English Association, and an elected Fellow of the Royal Society of the Arts (1995) and of the Royal Society of Edinburgh (2008).

== Honours ==
Professor Bone was knighted in the 2008 Birthday Honours for services to Higher Education and the regeneration of the North-West. He also received honorary degrees of Doctor of Letters (DLitt) from the Universities of Liverpool (2008), Lancaster (2008) and Chester (2009), and Doctor of the University (DUniv) from the University of Glasgow (2010). Bone is also a Maserati enthusiast, and was made a Freeman of the Worshipful Company of Coachmakers and Coach Harness Makers, a Livery Company promoting the automobile industry.

== Bibliography ==
- Byron (Writers and their work series) J.Drummond Bone (Author) Northcote House Publishers Ltd (6 Jan 2000) ISBN 0-7463-0775-6 ISBN 978-0-7463-0775-5
- The Cambridge Companion to Byron (Cambridge Companions to Literature series) Drummond Bone Cambridge University Press(18 Nov 2004) ISBN 0-521-78676-2 ISBN 978-0-521-78676-8 Note: this is an edited volume.

Academic offices
Preceded by Professor Norman Gowar	Principal; Royal Holloway, University of London; 2000–2002	Succeeded by Professor Stephen Hill
Preceded by Professor Philip Love	Vice-Chancellor of the University of Liverpool; 2002–2008	Succeeded by Sir Howard Joseph Newby
Preceded by Andrew Graham	Master of Balliol College, Oxford; 2011-2018	Succeeded by Helen Ghosh
