= Burnside Civic Centre =

Civic Centre in Adelaide, South Australia

Coordinates: 34°56′20″S 138°38′36″E

The Burnside Civic Centre houses the council chambers, community centre, library and ballroom of the City of Burnside, Adelaide, South Australia. It is located at the corner of Greenhill and Portrush Roads in Tusmore. It is opposite the shopping complex, Burnside Village.
