= Ellen Charlotte Higgins =

British teacher

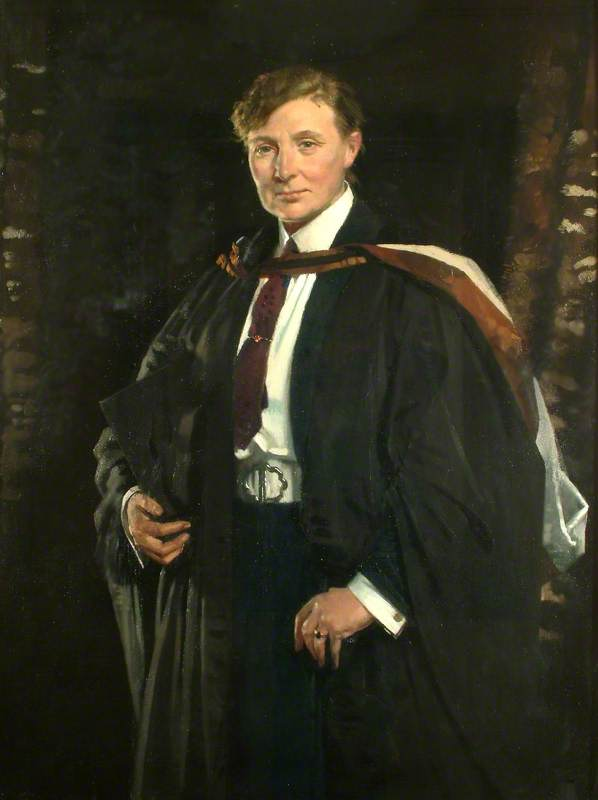
Image of Miss Ellen Charlotte Higgins

Ellen Charlotte Higgins (14 August 1871, Brixton, London – 13 December 1951, Edinburgh) was the third Principal of Royal Holloway College, University of London (RHC) from 1907 to 1935. Her father was a publisher and both parents were of Scottish descent. Her portrait is held in the Royal Holloway, University of London art collection.

== Education ==
She was educated at the private Edinburgh Ladies' College and won an entrance scholarship to RHC in 1890, one of 32 students joining that year. While at the college she played hockey and lived in the Founder's Building. She graduated with a London University degree with first class honours in English. She also was placed in the first classes of final honours in mathematics at the University of Oxford. (RHC entered students in examinations at one or both universities at the time, but Oxford did not award degrees to women until the 1920s, instead giving an indication of where they would have been placed if they did.)

== Career ==
After her student days at RHC she taught maths at Cheltenham Ladies' College from 1895 to 1907 becoming departmental head.

She became principal of RHC from 1907 to 1935, succeeding Dame Emily Penrose, she was the longest standing Principal of RHC and was known as 'The Chief' by the students. She was senator of London University from 1911 to 1935 and blocked a move to remove RHC from the university because of its 'remote location' though it is only 20 miles and 30 minutes by train from the centre of London. She had women admitted to the governing body and in 1920 the principal became a governor ex officio. In 1908, RHC's Women's Suffrage Society was founded. She was succeeded as principal by Miss Janet Ruth Bacon.

== Personal life ==
She became a close companion of the secretary to RHC's governors, Ulrica Dolling, who joined the staff in 1918. They lived together on retirement in 1935. Dolling died in 1970.

Academic offices
Preceded by Dame Emily Penrose	Principal; Royal Holloway College; University of London; 1907–1935	Succeeded by Janet Ruth Bacon
