= Elizabeth Millicent Chilver =

British educator

Elizabeth Leila Millicent "Sally" Chilver (née Graves; 3 August 1914 – 3 July 2014) was principal of Bedford College, University of London from 1964 to 1971 and Lady Margaret Hall, Oxford from 1971 to 1979.

== Background ==
The only daughter of Philip Perceval Graves and his wife Millicent, Elizabeth Chilver was educated at Benenden School and Somerville College, Oxford, where she was a close friend of Inez Pearn (later to become a novelist and marry Stephen Spender and subsequently – following respective divorces – Charles Madge). She was an historian, political scientist and anthropologist.

== Career ==
Chilver was a journalist from 1937 to 1939. During the Second World War she served as a temporary Civil Servant, and after it returned to journalism, writing for the Daily News (1945–47). From 1948 to 1957 she was a temporary principal and secretary of the Social Science Research Council and the Economic Research Committee of the Colonial Office. She became a director of University of London's Institute of Commonwealth Studies from 1957 to 1961 and was then a senior researcher there from 1961 to 1964, when she became Principal of Bedford College before in 1971 becoming Principal of Lady Margaret Hall. She established Bedford as a co-educational college in 1965.

In 1995 and 1996 various Festschrift publications appeared to celebrate her work, especially in the field of Cameroon Studies where she was known as "Mama for Story". In Cameroon she worked closely and published with Phyllis Kaberry.

== Personal life ==
In 1937, she married Richard Clementson Chilver (died 1985), a civil servant. She was a niece of Robert Graves and a friend of Inez Holden, who did research into the archives of the Baptist Mission to West Africa for which Chilver made payment arrangements.

== See also ==
- Royal Holloway College

Academic offices
Preceded by Norah Lillian Penston	Principal; Bedford College; University of London; 1964–71	Succeeded by John Nicholson Black
Preceded by Lucy Sutherland	Principal of Lady Margaret Hall, Oxford; 1971–79	Succeeded by Duncan Stewart
