= Lionel Harry Butler =

Lionel Butler

Principal of Royal Holloway College, University of London
- In office 1973–1981

Personal details
- Occupation: Academic Researcher Principal
- Nickname: Harry

Military service
- Allegiance: United Kingdom
- Branch/service: Royal Air Force
- Years of service: 1941-1943

Lionel (Harry) Butler (17 December 1923, Dudley – 26 November 1981, London) FRHistS MA DPhil was an academic and Principal of Royal Holloway College, University of London, (RHC) from 1973 until his death in 1981.

== Education and war service ==
Butler was educated at Dudley Boys Grammar School. From 1941-43 he did war service with the Royal Air Force (RAF). He then attended Magdalen College, Oxford, where he was an exhibitioner obtaining First Class Honours in Modern History in 1945.

== Career ==
He worked briefly as a lecturer at Magdalen and then as a research fellow of All Souls College, Oxford. In 1955 he was appointed the first Professor of Medieval History and later Vice-Principal of the University of St Andrews. He became the first male principal of RHC in 1973. Butler came to the college expecting to continue the expansion begun by his predecessor, Dame Marjorie Williamson. However, in his annual report for 1973/4 he stated: "We realised that [it]... would be a year of stringency with money in short supply.... The Government cuts in spending in December 1973 includes suspension... of compensation... for inflation, while rising costs... reduced the value of our grants."

In 1970 London University had set up a "Committee of Enquiry into the Governance of the University of London" chaired by Lord Murray of Newhaven with appointments by the university and also the University Grants Committee (UK). The "Murray Report" as it was known, covered all 34 constituent schools of the university and proposed "some kind of amalgamation" of schools for the purpose of economy in administration. By 1975/6 the resulting cuts had begun to threaten the quality of teaching, research, and the infrastructure. The incoming Conservative Government of 1979 cut another 14-15% from universities' budgets. This forced a reduction in staff by about 15% in 1981. A group of senior academics also concluded that the college could not survive alone, nor cover the academic range with reduced staff, and needed to combine with another of the smaller colleges. Before anything was finalised, Butler died suddenly on 26 November 1981 in London. Dr Roy Miller assumed authority in his capacity as Vice-Principal of RHC and later became the next principal.

== Personal life ==
He was the son of the late W. H. and M. G. Butler, of Dudley, Worcestershire. He married, on 16 October 1949, Gwendoline Williams, an author of novels and detective stories, the only daughter of Alice (Lee) and Alfred Edward Williams, of Blackheath, London. They had a daughter.

Academic offices
Preceded by Dame Marjorie Williamson	Principal; Royal Holloway College; University of London; 1973-1981	Succeeded by Dr Roy Miller
