= Emily Penrose =

British academic & college principal

Dame Emily Penrose DBE
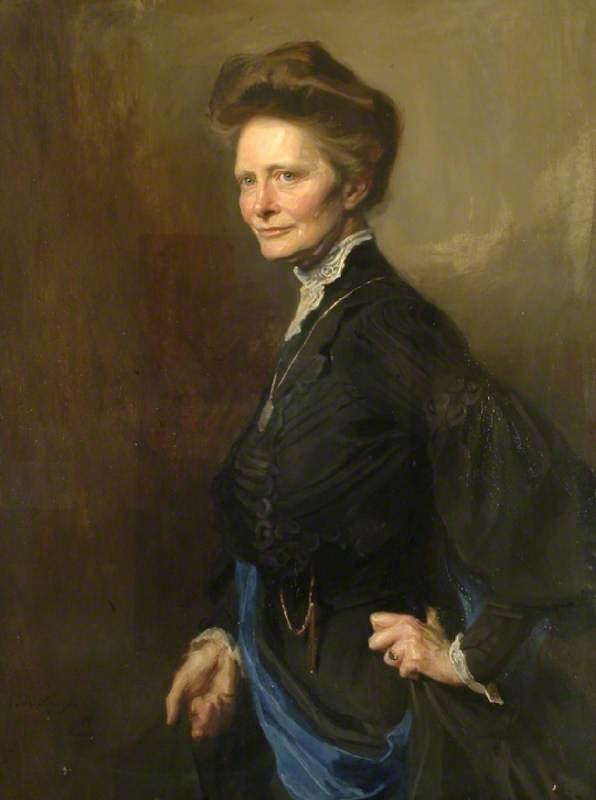
- Portrait commissioned by Royal Holloway of Dame Emily Penrose in 1907, by Philip de László
- Born: 18 September 1858; London, United Kingdom
- Died: 26 January 1942 (aged 83); Bournemouth, United Kingdom

Academic background
- Education: Somerville College, Oxford

Dame Emily Penrose, DBE (18 September 1858 – 26 January 1942) was British academic. She was an ancient historian and principal of three early women's university colleges in the United Kingdom: Bedford College from 1893 until 1898, Royal Holloway College from 1898 until 1907, and Somerville College, Oxford University from 1907 until 1926. She was the first woman to achieve First Class honours in Classics at Oxford University, and was instrumental in securing the admission of women as full members of the university in 1920. She became Oxford's first Dame in 1927.

== Family and early life ==
Emily Penrose was born in London in 1858. She was the second of five siblings, and oldest daughter of Francis Cramer Penrose and his wife Harriette Gibbes, the daughter of Francis Gibbes, a surgeon of Harewood in West Yorkshire. Her paternal grandmother was the author Elizabeth Penrose, who published under the name Mrs Markham.

== Private education ==
Penrose studied in a private school in Wimbledon before studying languages in Versailles, Paris, Dresden and Berlin. She also trained as an artist with her father; a watercolour of the Parthenon attributed to her is in the collection of the British Museum.

== Life in Athens ==
She lived with her family in Athens during 1886–87 while her father was director of the British School, during which time she kept a diary detailing her life in Athens and travels around Greece, and learned modern Greek.

Her diary from this period, now held at the British School, records her participation in the academic and social life of Athens, especially that of the foreign archaeological schools (which included the British School, the American School of Classical Studies, the German Archaeological Institute, and the French School). The British School also has at least one watercolour painting probably by her.

== Classics scholar ==
Penrose read for her degree at Somerville College at the University of Oxford, where she started as a scholar of Greats (Classics) in 1889; this involved her learning both Latin and ancient Greek from scratch. At the time, Honour Moderations for Classics were not open to women, so she moved straight to Finals without taking any other examinations during her course of study. She chose to specialise in archaeology after her experiences in Athens, and in 1892 became the first woman to achieve First Class honours in Greats (Classics).

As women were not able to gain a degree from the University of Oxford at that time, she was awarded an ad eundem University of Dublin Master of Arts degree in 1904. These degrees were awarded by the University of Dublin regularly between 1904 and 1907, in recognition of the work of women whose own universities did not award degrees to women at the time.

== Career ==
Upon completing her undergraduate studies, Penrose was offered a post by Agnes Maitland, the principal of Somerville, designed to keep her at the college as a combined tutor, librarian and secretary, but instead moved to London. She taught for a short time as an extension lecturer in Oxford and London before being appointed as Principal of Bedford College in 1893. Penrose was the first principal at Bedford, combining the former roles of Lady Resident, responsible for resident students, and Lady Superintendent, responsible for day students. She was given the additional post of Professor of Ancient History in 1894, "without additional stipend". According to Margaret Tuke's history of the college, "It is a tribute to her character and statesmanship that, in spite of the limited sphere accorded to her by the authorities, she should have accomplished so much in so few years."

Penrose then moved in 1898 to Royal Holloway College to become the college's second principal, following Matilda Bishop who had been its first. Bishop's resignation followed disagreement about Sunday Services with the college governors. During Penrose's time as principal, the students' social life developed as their numbers increased, even though Penrose had an unexpected weakness of shyness. In her history of the college Caroline Bingham argued that "Penrose, in a formative decade, set the college on the path which it would follow successfully". She was instrumental in gaining the college admission to the newly formed University of London in 1900. This change led to increasing numbers of students studying for and being awarded London degrees, and a movement away from studying Oxford courses (where the female students at Royal Holloway were not allowed to receive degrees, but instead received only a notification that they had completed the class). In her final year as principal at Royal Holloway, eight of the students were awarded First Class University of London degrees Penrose was also the chairman of the classical board and a member of the senate council of the University of London. Penrose was followed as principal at Royal Holloway by Ellen Charlotte Higgins.

In 1907 Penrose was appointed as Principal of Somerville College, Oxford, following the death of her predecessor, Agnes Maitland. Given her own academic qualifications, Penrose was described by the noted author and activist Vera Brittain in her history of Women's Education at Oxford as "the first genuine scholar among women [college] principals", and part of the significant transition towards colleges headed by figures with academic careers in their own right. In the beginning of her time at the college Penrose also served as the tutor for Greats in Classics, but eventually was forced by her administrative load to stop tutoring and focus on her work as college principal. Penrose was closely involved in the establishment of a university delegacy for women students in 1910, on which she served as an elected member. This delegacy led ten years later to the admission of women to full membership of the university. By 1914, under her influence, Somerville had stopped admitting students to the college who would not take the degree course, in order to build up a cohort of women students who were clearly qualified to receive degrees, a stance described as "forward-thinking." Penrose had also introduced an entrance examination for students seeking to join Somerville in 1908, making it the first women's college to do so. She helped restore Somerville's finances after World War I. She was responsible for adding additional tutors, including Helen Darbishire and Margaret Hayes Robinson to the Somerville staff, and enabled tutors to become part of Somerville's council for the first time in 1921.

Penrose's work for women's education had her involved in multiple national committees on education: she became a member of the Advisory Committee on University Grants in 1911, the only female member of the Royal Commission on University Education in Wales in 1916, and a member of the Royal Commission on the Universities of Oxford and Cambridge in 1919. Penrose became the statutory commissioner for the University of Oxford in 1923.

== Service in World War I and retirement ==
During her time as Principal of Somerville, Penrose presided over many changes, including plans for new buildings, major constitutional changes and temporary accommodation of the college in Oriel College during World War I.

She had responsibility for a range of war-time roles, including organisation of the National Registration in Oxford, and management of the Belgian Visitors' Committee. On her retirement in 1926, she was given a large sum as a farewell present, which she returned to the college to establish a student loan fund. She moved to London after her retirement, later moving to Bournemouth on the outbreak of World War II, where she died on 26 January 1942.

== Legacy ==
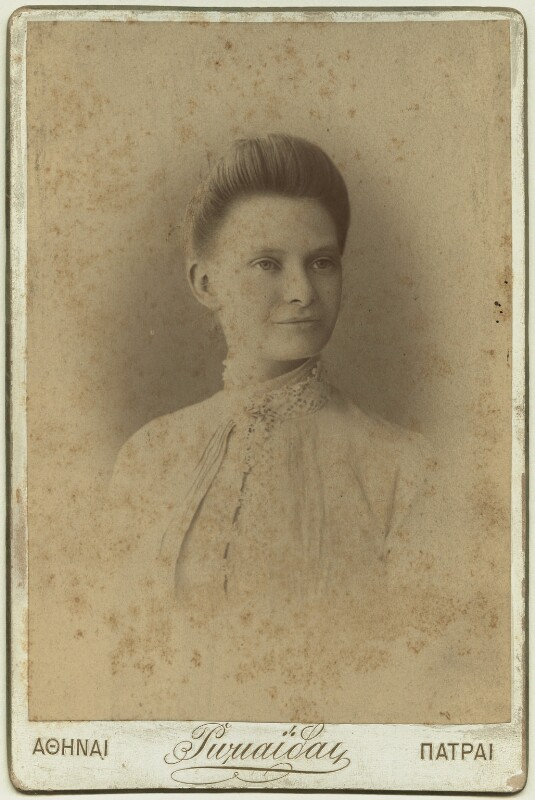
A portrait of Emily Penrose by the Rhomaides brothers.

The success of the 1920 campaign to admit women as full members of the University of Oxford owed much to the diplomatic skills and academic reputation of Penrose. On her retirement in 1926, Penrose was awarded an honorary Doctor of Civil Law (DCL) by Oxford, the second woman given this title after Queen Mary; Sheffield University also awarded her an honorary Doctorate of Laws (LLD). In 1927 she was made a Dame Commander of the Order of the British Empire for her work for education, making her Oxford's first Dame, and made the first Honorary Fellow of Somerville College. Somerville's Penrose building, opened in 1934, is named after her.

A 1946 obituary of Penrose concluded on her qualities, "For all her masculine powers and feminine accomplishments, her great qualities were neither masculine nor feminine, but simply those that belong to great persons."

Penrose was the subject of numerous photographs and portraits, including by Francis William Helps, Philip de László, and the Rhomaides Brothers.

Academic offices
Preceded by First appointment	Principal; Bedford College; University of London; 1893–1898	Succeeded by Ethel Hurlbatt
Preceded by Matilda Ellen Bishop	Principal; Royal Holloway College; University of London; 1898–1907	Succeeded by Ellen Charlotte Higgins
Preceded by Agnes Catherine Maitland	Principal; Somerville College; University of Oxford; 1907–1926	Succeeded by Margery Fry
