= Paul Layzell =

British academic, academic administrator, and software engineer

Paul John Layzell CBE DL CEng FBCS FHEA
- Occupations: Principal, Royal Holloway, University of London (2010-2022)
- Awards: Deputy Lieutenant of Surrey

Academic background
- Education: University of Manchester; (BA, MSc, PhD)

Academic work
- Discipline: Engineering
- Sub-discipline: Software Engineering
- Institutions: Royal Holloway, University of London; University of Sussex; University of Manchester

Paul John Layzell (born 23 July 1957) is a British academic, academic administrator, and software engineer. From August 2010 until July 2022, he served as Principal of Royal Holloway, University of London. He is also Deputy Vice-Chancellor of the University of London and Treasurer of Universities UK.

He previously worked at the University of Manchester Institute of Science and Technology (UMIST), rising to become Professor of Computer Science (1995–2004) and its Pro-Vice-Chancellor (2000–2004). He then joined its successor, the University of Manchester, where he was Vice-President (University Development) from 2004 to 2006. Before joining Royal Holloway, he was Deputy Vice-Chancellor of the University of Sussex (2006–2010).

Layzell was appointed Commander of the Order of the British Empire (CBE) in the 2022 Birthday Honours for services to higher education and technology.

== Controversies ==
Layzell has been criticised in the past for statements made regarding women and BAME groups. Royal Holloway's student magazine Orbital quoted him as claiming in an open staff meeting of 29 November 2017 that "there are certain protected groups where there is a natural tendency to not have a go and put themselves in for promotion – sometimes that's gender, sometimes it's the BAME group". The magazine also states that Layzell hinted during the meeting that "women were better suited to teaching than research". This was after gender pay gap statistics were released showing that the pay gap for full-time professors at Royal Holloway had increased from 8.1% in 2015/16 to 10.01% in 2016/17, making it the 7th worst university in the UK for the gender pay gap for full-time professors.

He was also the centre of criticism regarding Royal Holloway's treatment of academics who underwent industrial action in 2018. During the University and College Union (UCU) pension strikes, a group of students spent almost 120 hours occupying the corridor outside of Layzell's office in solidarity with the striking staff. The occupation ended when Layzell released an apology for the College's treatment of striking staff, which had caused the Royal Holloway branch of the UCU to refer to it as "the UK's most hard-line university employer".

== Selected works ==
- Spurr, Kathy; Layzell, Paul, eds. (1990). CASE on Trial. Chichester: Wiley. ISBN 978-0471928935.
- Spurr, Kathy; Layzell, Paul, eds. (1992). CASE: current practice, future prospects. Chichester: J. Wiley. ISBN 978-0471933045.
- Davies, C. G.; Layzell, P. J. (1993). The Jackson Approach to System Development: An Introduction. Bromley: Chartwell Bratt. ISBN 978-0862383213.
- Spurr, Kathy; Layzell, Paul; Jennison, Leslie; Richards, Neil, eds. (1994). Business objects: software solutions. Chichester: Wiley. ISBN 978-0471951872.
