= Edith Clara Batho =

Dr. Edith Clara Batho (21 September 1895 – 21 January 1986) was Principal of Royal Holloway College, University of London (RHC) from 1945 to 1962.

== Education ==
She was educated at Highbury Hill High School, now Highbury Fields School in Islington, London. She then went on to University College, London (UCL) and graduated in English in 1915.

== Career ==
After the First World War she taught at Roedean, returning to UCL in 1921 as an Assistant in English. She was appointed Reader in English Literature and awarded DLit in 1935.

She was appointed Principal of RHC in 1945 and chose Dr Constance West as her Vice-Principal. Her first task was to restore the college following disruption of the war years and expand the residential space as post-war demand for university places increased. (The college had been partially occupied by the women's ATS Officer Cadets' Training Unit (OCTU) during the war.) In the academic year 1946/7 numbers rose by almost 50% and almost 30% in the year following (to 330) which included eight male postgraduates for the first time.

The Royal Holloway College Act (1949) abolished the Board of Governors replacing it with a College Council chaired by Princess Alice, Countess of Athlone. Under the terms of the Act the Principal still had to be female but during Batho's term of office men became in authority in most other areas. In 1945/46 there were 8 men out of 34 in the whole academic community. By the end of her term this had changed to 35 out of 76. By the end of the 1950s there were 389 students and the decision to take men undergraduates was taken in 1960 when many universities in the country were planning expansion. The first 100 or so men undergraduates arrived in 1965.

RHC planned expansion at that time to 1,000 students split equally between men and women. The responsibility for putting the plans into being was down to Batho's successor, Dame Marjorie Williamson.

== Publications ==
- The Victorians and After, 1830-1914 (Introductions to English Literature, vol 4), 1938, Edith Clara Batho, Guy Patterson Chapman, Bonamy Dobrée
- A Wordsworth Selection, 1962 Chosen and edited by Edith Clara Batho

Academic offices
Preceded by Fanny Street	Principal; Royal Holloway College; University of London; 1945 -1962	Succeeded by Dame Marjorie Williamson
