= Fanny Street =

Fanny Street (21 November 1877 - 20 March 1962) was a teacher and writer, Acting Principal of Royal Holloway College, University of London (RHC) in 1944–1945. Her brother was Arthur George Street author of Farmer's Glory.

== Early life ==
Born at Wilton, Wiltshire, the daughter of a tenant farmer, Street was educated at the Wilton Elementary School, becoming a pupil teacher, and then at the Salisbury Diocesan Training College and Whitelands Training College, Chelsea. After returning to the Diocesan College, she lectured in History for three years and then recognized she needed a degree. She was awarded a scholarship to the Royal Holloway College, where she gained a First Class Honours degree in history in 1907.

== Career ==
Street was a lecturer at the Royal Holloway College from 1911 to 1917 and then worked briefly in the Ministry of Food Control. She was a suffragist and joined the Labour Party when women were enfranchised.

Together with Miss Phoebe Walters, Director of Music at the Royal Holloway College from 1904 to 1915, Street founded Hillcroft College for Working Women in Surbiton, Surrey, and was the first principal there from 1929 to 1933. The college was intended to be a female equivalent to Ruskin College, Oxford.

Between 1933 and 1947 she was the Royal Holloway College Association (the college alumni organisation) representative on the college's governing body. She became acting principal after the resignation of Miss Janet Bacon. She was not eligible for permanent appointment, as she was already aged 66. She was succeeded by Dr Edith Clara Batho.

For many years Street was a leading figure in the British Federation of University Women. She died unmarried in 1962, at Hindhead, Surrey.

Academic offices
Preceded by Janet Ruth Bacon	Acting Principal; Royal Holloway College; University of London; 1944 -1945	Succeeded by Dr Edith Clara Batho
