= List of fellows of the British Academy elected in the 2020s =

The Fellowship of the British Academy consists of world-leading scholars and researchers in the humanities and social sciences. A varying number of fellows are elected each year in July at the Academy's annual general meeting.

== 2026 ==
On 17 July 2026, the following were elected to the fellowship; 58 fellows, 32 international fellows, and 2 honorary fellows.

UK Fellows:

- Professor Neil Adger, Professor of Human Geography, University of Exeter
- Professor Jo Applin, Walter H. Annenberg Professor in the History of Art, Courtauld Institute of Art
- Professor John Arnold, Professor of Medieval History, University of Cambridge
- Professor Manuel Barcia, Pro-Vice Chancellor for Global Engagement at the University of Bath
- Professor David Barnett, Professor of Theatre, University of York
- Professor Mia Bay, Paul Mellon Professor of American History, University of Cambridge
- Professor Matthew Bell, Professor of German and Comparative Literature, King’s College London
- Professor Sonia Bhalotra, Professor of Economics, University of Warwick
- Professor Katherine Brickell, Professor of Urban Studies and Associate Dean for Impact and Innovation, King’s College London
- Professor Jill Burke, Chair of Renaissance Visual and Material Culture, University of Edinburgh
- Professor Eamonn Carrabine, Professor of Sociology, University of Essex
- Professor Rebecca Cassidy, William Wyse Professor of Social Anthropology at the University of Cambridge
- Professor Chantal Conneller, Professor of Early Prehistory, Newcastle University
- Professor Adam Crawford FAcSS, Professor of Policing & Social Justice, University of York; Professor of Criminology & Criminal Justice, University of Leeds; Deputy Associate Dean for Research (Impact & Engagement), University of York; Co-Director of the ESRC Vulnerability & Policing Futures Research Centre, Universities of York and Leeds
- Professor Nandini Das, Professor of Early Modern Literature and Culture, University of Oxford, and Fellow of Exeter College, University of Oxford
- Professor Lorraine Dearden FAcSS, Professor of Economics and Social Statistics, University College London
- Professor Nicola Dibben, Professor of Music, University of Sheffield
- Professor Zoltan Dienes, Professor of Psychology, University of Sussex
- Professor Dimo Dimov, Professor of Entrepreneurship and Innovation, University of Bath
- Professor Karen Douglas, Professor of Social Psychology, University of Kent
- Professor Carolin Duttlinger, Professor of German Literature and Culture, University of Oxford, and Ockenden Fellow in German, Wadham College Oxford
- Professor Jane Falkingham FAcSS CBE, Director, ESRC Centre for Population Change, and Vice President (Engagement & International) at the University of Southampton
- Professor Elizabeth Fisher, Professor of Environmental Law, Faculty of Law and Corpus Christi College, University of Oxford
- Professor Dorian Fuller FLS FSA, Professor of Archaeobotany, University College London
- Professor Robert Gleave, Professor of Arabic Studies, University of Exeter
- Professor Susan Harrow, Ashley Watkins Chair of French Language and Literature, University of Bristol
- Professor Kirsty Hooper, Professor of Hispanic Studies, University of Warwick
- Professor Christopher Insole , Professor of Philosophical Theology and Ethics, Durham University
- Professor John Jackson, Emeritus Professor of Comparative Criminal Law & Procedure, University of Nottingham
- Professor Mark Jackson, Professor of the History of Medicine, University of Exeter
- Professor Will Jennings, Professor of Political Science and Public Policy, School of Economic, Social and Political Sciences, University of Southampton and Associate Dean (Research), Faculty of Social Sciences, University of Southampton
- Professor Roshini Kempadoo, Media Artist and Photographer and Professor of Photography and Visual Culture at the University of Westminster
- Professor Anna Korhonen, Professor of Natural Language Processing, University of Cambridge
- Professor Miriam Leonard, Professor of Greek Literature and its Reception, University College London
- Professor Stephan Lewandowsky, Professor of Cognitive Science, University of Bristol
- Professor Morwenna Ludlow, Professor of Christian History and Theology, University of Exeter
- Professor Celia Lury, Professor at the Centre of Interdisciplinary Methodologies, University of Warwick
- Professor Lutz Marten, Professor of General and African Linguistics, SOAS University of London
- Professor Benjamin Moll, Sir John Hicks Chair and Professor of Economics, London School of Economics and Political Science
- Dr Miranda Morris, Independent Researcher
- Professor Mark Olssen, Emeritus Professor of Political Theory and Higher Education Policy, University of Surrey
- Professor Patricia Owens, Professor of International Relations, University of Oxford
- Professor Richard Pettigrew, Professor of Philosophy, University of Bristol
- Professor Lucia Prauscello, Senior Research Fellow, All Soul College, Oxford
- Professor Stephanie Rickard, Professor of Political Economy, London School of Economics
- Professor Joel Robbins, Sigrid Rausing Professor of Social Anthropology, University of Cambridge
- Professor Pamela Sammons PRSA, Professor (Emeritus) of Education, University of Oxford
- Professor Nicholas Shea, Professor of Philosophy, Institute of Philosophy, School of Advanced Study, University of London
- Professor Jackie Stacey, Professor of Cultural Studies and Co-Director of the Centre for the Study of Sexuality and Culture, University of Manchester
- Professor Emma Tarlo, Emeritus Professor of Anthropology, Goldsmiths, University of London
- Professor Stephen Tierney KC (HON) FRSE, Professor of Constitutional Theory, Edinburgh School of Law, University of Edinburgh
- Professor Elizabeth Tyler, Professor of Medieval Literature, Department of English and Related Literature, University of York
- Professor Karin Wahl-Jorgensen FLSW, Professor, School of Journalism, Media and Culture, Cardiff University
- Professor James Warren, Professor of Ancient Philosophy at the University of Cambridge and Fellow of Corpus Christi College
- Professor Jane Whittle, Professor of Economic and Social History, University of Exeter
- Professor James Williams, Professor of Modern French Literature and Film, Royal Holloway, University of London
- Professor Youngjin Yoo, Professor of Management, The London School of Economics and Political Science
- Professor Noam Yuchtman FREcon, Hayek Professor of Political Economy, Department of Management, London School of Economics and Political Science

International Fellows

- Professor Lila Abu-Lughod, Joseph L. Buttenwieser Professor of Social Science, Department of Anthropology and Institute for the Study of Sexuality and Gender, Columbia University
- Professor Seema Alavi, Professor at the Department of History, Ashoka University
- Professor Alfredo J. Artiles, Lee L. Jack Professor of Education at Stanford University
- Professor Sandra Black, Professor at the Department of Economics, University of Texas at Austin
- Professor Antony Brown, Professor at the Tromsø University Museum, Arctic University of Norway
- Hassoum Ceesay ORG, Director General, National Centre for Arts and Culture, The Gambia
- Dr Brett Christophers, Professor at the Institute for Housing and Urban Research, Uppsala University
- Professor Deborah Cohen, Leopold Professor of History and Director at the Roberta Buffett Institute for Global Affairs, Northwestern University
- Dr Kimberlé Crenshaw, Isidor and Seville Sulzbacher Professor of Law at Columbia Law School, and Distinguished Professor of Law and the Promise Institute Chair on Human Rights at UCLA School of Law
- Professor Joy Damousi AM FAHA FASSA, Dean of Arts and Director of the Institute of Humanities and Social Sciences, Australian Catholic University
- Professor Anne Duprat, Professor at Université de Picardie Jules Verne and Senior Member of Institut universitaire de France
- Professor Paula England, Dean of Social Science and Professor at New York University, Abu Dhabi
- Professor Judy Fudge FRSC, Professor Emeritus, McMaster University
- Dr Michele Gelfand, The John H Scully Professor in Cross-Cultural Management and Professor of Organisational Behaviour, Stanford Graduate School of Business; Professor of Psychology by courtesy at Stanford University
- Professor Haneda Masashi, Emeritus Professor, the University of Tokyo, President at the Toyota Foundation, and President, Mishima Kaiun Memorial Foundation
- Professor David R. M. Irving FAHA FRHistS, ICREA Research Professor in Musicology at the Institució Milà i Fontanals de Recerca en Humanitats, CSIC
- Professor Béatrice Longuenesse AAAS, Julius Silver Professor, Professor of Philosophy Emerita, New York University
- Professor John Ma, Professor of Classics, Columbia University
- Professor N. Gregory Mankiw, Robert M. Beren Professor of Economics, Harvard University
- Professor Anita McGahan, University Professor and George E. Connell Professor of Organisations and Society, University of Toronto
- Dr Mary Louise Pratt, Silver Professor Emerita, New York University and Olive H. Palmer Professor of Humanities, Emerita, Stanford University
- Professor Ronit Ricci, Sternberg-Tamir Chair in Comparative Cultures, Hebrew University of Jerusalem
- Professor Hartmut Rosa, Full Professor of Sociology and Social Theory at Friedrich-Schiller-University Jena and Germany Director of the Max-Weber-Centre, University of Erfurt
- Professor Elinor Saiegh-Haddad, Full Professor, Bar-Ilan University
- Professor Salvatore Settis, Emeritus Professor of the History of Classical Art and Archaeology at the Scuola Normale Superiore
- Professor Robert Stam, University Professor (equivalent of Distinguished Professor) New York University
- Professor Chloë Starr, Professor of Asian Christianity and Theology, Yale University
- Professor Joshua Tenenbaum, Whitehead Professor of Computational Cognitive Science, Massachusetts Institute of Technology
- Professor Lisa Wedeen, Mary R. Morton Distinguished Service Professor of Political Science and the College, The University of Chicago
- Professor James Q. Whitman, Ford Foundation Professor of Comparative and Foreign Law, Yale University
- Professor Anders Winroth, Professor of History, University of Oslo
- Professor Hirokazu Yoshikawa, Courtney Sale Ross Professor of Globalization and Education and University Professor, New York University

Honorary Fellows

- Dr Fiona Hill CMG FRSA, Senior Fellow at The Brookings Institution and Chancellor at Durham University
- The Right Honourable Dame Siobhan Keegan DBE KC, Lady Chief Justice of Northern Ireland

== 2025 ==
On 17 July 2025, the following were elected to the fellowship; 58 fellows, 30 international fellows, and 4 honorary fellows.

UK Fellows:

- Professor Jeremy Adelman FBA, Professor and Director of the Global History Lab, University of Cambridge
- Professor Ian Apperly FBA, Professor of Cognition and Development, University of Birmingham
- Professor Chrisanthi Avgerou FBA, Professor of Information Systems, London School of Economics
- Professor Matthew Baerman FBA, Professorial Research Fellow, Surrey Morphology Group, University of Surrey
- Professor Anthony Bale FBA, Professor of Medieval and Renaissance English (1954), University of Cambridge; Professorial Fellow, Girton College, Cambridge
- Professor Rosalind Ballaster FBA, Professor of Eighteenth-Century Studies and Professorial Fellow in English, Mansfield College, University of Oxford
- Reverend Professor John Behr FBA, Regius Chair of Humanity, University of Aberdeen
- Professor Alexander Betts FBA, Professor of Forced Migration and International Affairs, University of Oxford; Fellow, Brasenose College, Oxford; Pro-Vice-Chancellor for External Engagement
- Professor Gert Biesta FBA, Professor of Educational Theory and Pedagogy, The Moray House School of Education and Sport, University of Edinburgh; Professor of Public Education, The Centre for Public Education and Pedagogy, Maynooth University, Ireland
- Professor Annabel Brett FBA, Professor of Political Thought and History, University of Cambridge
- Professor Julie Brown FBA, Professor Emerita of Music, Royal Holloway, University of London
- Professor Callum Brown FBA, FRSE, Professor Emeritus in History, University of Glasgow
- Professor Erica Carter FBA, Professor of German and Film, King’s College London
- Professor Hasok Chang FBA, Hans Rausing Professor of History and Philosophy of Science, University of Cambridge
- Professor Nick Couldry FBA, Professor of Media, Communications and Social Theory Emeritus, and Professorial Research Fellow, London School of Economics and Political Science
- Professor Tim Cresswell FBA, Ogilvie Professor of Geography, University of Edinburgh
- Professor Max Deeg FBA, Chair in Buddhist Studies, School of History, Archaeology and Religion, Cardiff University
- Professor Stefan Dercon FBA, CMG, Professor of Economic Policy, Blavatnik School of Government and Economics Department, University of Oxford
- Professor Timothy Devinney FBA, Professor and Chair of International Business, Alliance Manchester Business School, University of Manchester
- Professor Stephen Edwards FBA, Manton Professor of British Art and Director of the Manton Centre for British Art, The Courtauld Institute of Art, University of London
- Professor Thalia Eley FBA, Professor of Developmental Behavioural Genetics and Social, Genetic and Developmental Psychiatry Centre, Head of Department, Institute of Psychiatry, Psychology and Neuroscience, King’s College London
- Professor Haidy Geismar FBA, Professor of Anthropology and Director of the UCL School for the Creative and Cultural Industries, University College London
- Professor Ian Gough FBA, FAcSS, Visiting Professor, CASE (Centre for the Analysis of Social Policy), London School of Economics
- Professor Catherine Grant FBA, Senior Visiting Research Fellow, School of Arts and Communication Design, University of Reading; Honorary Professor in the Department of Media Studies and Journalism, School of Communication and Culture, Aarhus University
- Professor Daniel Grimley, FBA, Head of Humanities and Professor of Music, University of Oxford; Professorial Fellow, Merton College, Oxford
- Professor Margaret Hillenbrand FBA, Professor of Modern Chinese Literature and Visual Culture, University of Oxford
- Professor Jacqueline Hodgson FBA, Professor of Law, University of Warwick
- Professor Jennifer Howard-Grenville FBA, Diageo Professor of Organisation Studies, Cambridge Judge Business School, University of Cambridge
- Professor Caroline Humfress FBA, FRHS, FSLS, Professor of Medieval History, University of St Andrews
- Professor Elizabeth Jefferies FBA, Professor, Department of Psychology, University of York
- Professor Mark Knights FBA, Professor of History, University of Warwick
- Professor Roger Koenker FBA, Honorary Professor of Economics, University College London
- Professor Barak Kushner FBA, Professor of East Asian History, Faculty of Asian and Middle Eastern Studies, University of Cambridge
- Professor Claire Langhamer FBA, FRHistS, Director, Institute of Historical Research and Professor of Modern History, University of London
- Professor Tomila Lankina FBA, Professor, Department of International Relations, London School of Economics and Political Science
- Professor George Lau FBA, Professor of Art and Archaeology of the Americas, Sainsbury Research Unit for the Arts of Africa, Oceania & the Americas, University of East Anglia
- Professor Maria Lee FBA, Professor of Law, University College London
- Professor Gilat Levy FBA, Professor, Department of Economics, London School of Economics
- Professor David A. Lines FBA, Head of Italian Studies, School of Modern Languages and Cultures, University of Warwick
- Professor Marta Mirazón Lahr FBA, Professor in Human Evolutionary Biology and Prehistory, Department of Archaeology, University of Cambridge
- Professor Irini Moustaki FBA, Professor in Social Statistics, London School of Economics and Political Science
- Professor Yael Navaro FBA, Professor of Social, Political and Psychological Anthropology, University of Cambridge; Professorial Fellow, Newnham College
- Professor Joanna Page (academic) FBA, Professor of Latin American Studies, University of Cambridge
- Professor David Papineau FBA, Professor of Philosophy, King's College London
- Professor Clare Pettitt FBA, Grace 2 Professor of English, University of Cambridge
- Professor Christopher Philo FBA, FAcSS, Professor of Geography, School of Geographical and Earth Sciences, University of Glasgow
- Professor Diane Reay FBA, Emeritus Professor of Education, University of Cambridge
- Professor John Robb FBA, Professor of European Prehistory, University of Cambridge; Fellow, Peterhouse, Cambridge
- Professor Jeremy Robbins FBA, Emeritus Forbes Professor of Hispanic Studies, University of Edinburgh
- Professor Alison Salvesen FBA, Professor of Early Judaism and Christianity, Faculty of Asian and Middle Eastern Studies, University of Oxford
- Professor Sarah Semple FBA, Professor of Archaeology, Department of Archaeology, Durham University
- Professor Jennifer Smith FBA, Professor of Sociolinguistics, University of Glasgow
- Professor Lionel Smith FBA, Professor of Comparative Law, University of Oxford; Fellow, Brasenose College, Oxford
- Professor Joanna Story FBA, Professor of Early Medieval History, University of Leicester
- Professor Peter Thonemann FBA, Professor of Ancient History, University of Oxford; Forrest-Derow Fellow and Tutor in Ancient History, Wadham College, Oxford
- Professor Leon Tikly FBA, FAcSS, Professor in Education, University of Bristol
- Professor Satnam Virdee FBA, FRSE, Professor of Sociology, University of Glasgow
- Professor Richard Whatmore FBA, Professor of Modern History, University of St Andrews

International Fellows

- Professor Dominique Barthélemy FBA, Emeritus Professor in Medieval History, Université Paris-Sorbonne (Paris IV)
- Professor Ann M. Blair FBA, Carl H Pforzheimer University Professor, Harvard University
- Professor Joanna Bruck FBA, MRIA, FSA, MIAI, Full Professor of Archaeology, University College Dublin
- Professor Esteban Buch FBA, Professor of Music History, École des Hautes Études en Sciences Sociales (EHESS)
- Professor Xingcan Chen FBA, Professor in Chinese Archaeology and Director, Institute of Archaeology, Chinese Academy of Social Sciences
- Professor Linda Darling-Hammond FBA, Founding President and Chief Knowledge Officer, Learning Policy Institute; Charles E Ducommun Professor Emeritus, Stanford University
- Professor Margaret Davies FBA, Professor of Law, Flinders University
- Professor Mark Franko FBA, Laura H Carnell Professor of Dance, Boyer College of Music and Dance, Temple University
- Professor Pinelopi Koujianou Goldberg FBA, William Nordhaus Professor of Economics and Global Affairs, Yale University
- Professor Claudia Dale Goldin FBA, Henry Lee Professor of Economics, Harvard University
- Professor Sarah Francesca Green FBA, Professor of Social and Cultural Anthropology, University of Helsinki
- Professor Peter Hagoort FBA, Emeritus-director, Max Planck Institute for Psycholinguistics
- Professor Bonnie Honig FBA, Nancy Duke Lewis Professor, Political Science and Modern Culture and Media, Brown University
- Professor Jonathan David Jansen FBA, Distinguished Professor of Education, Stellenbosch University
- Professor Robert A Kaster FBA, Professor of Classics, Emeritus, and Kennedy Foundation Professor of Latin, Emeritus, Princeton University
- Professor Lily Kong BBM, PPA, FBA, President and Lee Kong Chian Chair Professor of Social Sciences, Singapore Management University
- Professor Dr Reinhard Gregor Kratz FBA, Ordinary Professor, Theological Faculty, Department for Old Testament, Georg-August-University Göttingen
- Professor Marilyn Lee Lake AO, FAHA, FASSA, FBA, Honorary Professorial Fellow, School of Historical and Philosophical Studies, The University of Melbourne
- Professor Dr Ulman E R Lindenberger FBA, Director, Max Planck Institute for Human Development, Berlin
- Professor Josephine McDonagh FBA, The Randy L and Melvin R Berlin Chair of the Development of the Novel in English, University of Chicago
- Professor Lynn Meskell FBA, Penn Integrates Knowledge (PIK) Professor, Department of Anthropology, School of Arts & Sciences, Department of Historic Preservation, Weitzman School of Design, and Penn Museum, University of Pennsylvania; AD White Professor-at-Large, Cornell University
- Professor Rajend Mesthrie FBA, Emeritus Professor and Senior Research Fellow, Department of African Studies and Linguistics, University of Cape Town
- Professor Stephanie Newell FBA, George M Bodman Professor of English, Yale University
- Professor Fionnuala D Ní Aoláin FBA, KC (Hons), Regents Professor, Robina Chair in Law, Public Policy, and Society, University of Minnesota Law School; Professor of Law, School of Law, The Queens University, Belfast
- Professor Pierre Rosanvallon FBA, Emeritus Professor, Collège de France
- Professor Diana Taylor FBA, University Professor and Professor of Performance Studies and Spanish, New York University
- Professor Ayanna Thompson FBA, Regents Professor of English, Executive Director of the Arizona Center for Medieval and Renaissance Studies, Arizona State University
- Professor Camilla Townsend FBA, Board of Governors Distinguished Professor of History, Rutgers University
- Professor Haridimos Tsoukas FBA, Professor of Strategic Management, University of Cyprus; Professor of Organizational Behaviour, University of Warwick
- Professor Susan R Rose Wolf FBA, Distinguished Professor, Emerita, University of North Carolina, Chapel Hill

Honorary Fellows

- Lindsey Hilsum HonFBA, International Editor, Channel 4 News
- Professor Lubaina Himid CBE, RA, HonFBA, Artist and curator; Professor of Contemporary Art, University of Central Lancashire
- Richard Ovenden OBE, FSA, FRSA, FRHistS, FRSE, HonFBA, Bodley's Librarian and the Helen Hamlyn Director of University Libraries
- Dame Judith Weir DBE, HonFRSE, Previous Master of the King’s Music; President of the Royal Society of Musicians

== 2024 ==
On 18 July 2024, the following were elected to the fellowship; 52 fellows, 30 international fellows, and 4 honorary fellows.

Fellows

- Professor Nava Ashraf, Professor of Economics, London School of Economics
- Professor Subhabrata (Bobby) Banerjee, Professor of Sustainability, Bayes Business School, City, University of London
- Professor Peter Boxall, Goldsmiths’ Professor of English Literature, University of Oxford
- Professor Gordon Brown, Professor in Psychology, University of Warwick
- Professor Stuart Carroll, Professor of Early Modern History, University of York
- Professor Shadreck Chirikure, Edward Hall Professor of Archaeological Science, Director, Research Laboratory for Archaeology and the History of Art, University of Oxford
- Professor Sara Cohen, James and Constance Alsop Chair in Music, University of Liverpool
- Professor Tim Dalgleish, Programme Leader, Medical Research Council Cognition and Brain Sciences Unit, University of Cambridge
- Professor Anne Davies, Professor of Law and Public Policy, Faculty of Law and Brasenose College, University of Oxford
- Professor Norman Doe KC, Professor of Law, Director of the Centre for Law and Religion, School of Law and Politics, Cardiff University
- Professor Alex Edmans, Professor of Finance, London Business School
- Professor Esther Eidinow, Professor of Ancient History, University of Bristol
- Professor William Fitzgerald, Professor of Latin, King’s College London
- Professor Maria Cristina Fumagalli, Professor, Department of Literature, Film, and Theatre Studies, University of Essex
- Professor Katy Gardner, Professor of Anthropology, London School of Economics
- Professor David Gellner, Professor of Social Anthropology, University of Oxford; Fellow, All Souls College, Oxford
- Professor Alain George, I M Pei Professor of Islamic Art and Architecture, Director, Khalili Research Centre, Faculty of Asian and Middle Eastern Studies, University of Oxford; Fellow, Wolfson College, Oxford
- Professor Sophie Gilliat-Ray OBE, FLSW, Professor of Religious Studies and Director, Islam-UK Centre, Cardiff University
- Professor Kristian Skrede Gleditsch, Regius Professor of Political Science, University of Essex
- Professor Daniel Goodley, Professor of Disability Studies and Education, iHuman and School of Education, University of Sheffield
- Professor Toby Green, Professor of Precolonial and Lusophone African History and Culture, King’s College London
- Professor Timothy Greenwood, Professor of History, University of St Andrews
- Professor Daniel Harbour, Professor of the Cognitive Science of Language, Queen Mary University of London
- Professor Tim Harper, Professor of the History of Southeast Asia, University of Cambridge
- Professor Alvin Jackson FRSE, Hon MRIA, MAE, Sir Richard Lodge Professor of History, University of Edinburgh
- Professor Liz James, Professor of Art History, University of Sussex
- Professor David James FAcSS, FRSA, FHEA, Professor of Sociology of Education, Cardiff University
- Professor Carey Jewitt, Professor of Technology and Learning, UCL Knowledge Lab, Department of Culture, Communication and Media, IOE, University College London
- Professor Helen Kennedy, Professor of Digital Society, University of Sheffield
- Professor Justin Lewis, Professor of Creative Economy, Centre for the Creative Economy, Cardiff University
- Professor Rosalind Love, Elrington and Bosworth Professor of Anglo-Saxon, University of Cambridge
- Professor Asifa Majid, Professor of Cognitive Science, University of Oxford; Fellow, St Hugh's College, Oxford
- Professor David McCallam, Reader in French Eighteenth-Century Studies, University of Sheffield
- Professor Nasar Meer FRSE, FAcSS, Professor of Social and Political Science, University of Glasgow
- Professor Miriam Meyerhoff, Senior Research Fellow, All Souls College, University of Oxford
- Professor James Montgomery, Sir Thomas Adams’s Professor of Arabic, University of Cambridge
- Professor Janet Montgomery, Professor of Bioarchaeology, Durham University
- Professor Adrian Moore, Professor of Philosophy, University of Oxford; Fellow, St Hugh’s College, Oxford
- Professor Lydia Morris, Professor of Sociology, University of Essex
- Professor Rachael Mulheron KC (Hon), Professor of Tort Law and Civil Justice, School of Law, Queen Mary University of London
- Professor Lucy O'Brien, Richard Wollheim Professor of Philosophy, University College London
- Professor Elias Papaioannou, Professor of Economics, London Business School
- Professor Philomen Probert, Professor of Classical Philology and Linguistics, University of Oxford; Fellow, Wolfson College, Oxford
- Professor Ricardo Reis, A W Phillips Professor of Economics, London School of Economics
- Professor Jennifer Robinson, Professor of Human Geography, University College London
- Professor Rebecca Sear, Professor and Director of the Centre for Culture and Evolution, Brunel University
- Professor Alison Shell, Professor of Early Modern Studies, Department of English, University College London
- Canon Professor Michael Snape, Michael Ramsey Professor of Anglican Studies, Durham University
- Professor Elisabeth van Houts, Emeritus Honorary Professor in European Medieval History, University of Cambridge; Life-Fellow, Emmanuel College, Cambridge
- Professor Phiroze Vasunia, Professor of Greek, University College London
- Professor Lea Ypi, Professor of Political Theory, London School of Economics and Political Science
- Professor Ayşe Zarakol, Professor of International Relations, University of Cambridge; Fellow, Emmanuel College, Cambridge

International fellows

- Professor Sunil Amrith, Renu and Anand Dhawan Professor of History, Yale University
- Professor Kwame Anthony Appiah FRSL, Silver Professor of Philosophy and Law, New York University
- Professor Richard Aslin, Senior Research Scientist, Child Study Center, Yale School of Medicine; Senior Research Scientist, Department of Psychology, Yale University
- Professor Mauricio Avendano, Associate Professor and Co-Director Health Economics and Policy Unit, University of Lausanne
- Professor Shadi Bartsch-Zimmer, Distinguished Service Professor of Classics, The University of Chicago
- Professor Lauren Benton, Barton M Biggs Professor of History and Professor of Law, Yale University
- Professor Judith Carney, Distinguished Research Professor Emerita, Department of Geography, University of California Los Angeles
- Professor David Chalmers, University Professor of Philosophy and Neural Science, New York University
- Professor Joseph Chan, Distinguished Senior Research Fellow, Research Center for Humanities and Social Science, Academia Sinica, Taiwan
- Professor Wendy Hui Kyong Chun, Canada 150 Research Chair, Professor of Communication, Director of the Digital Democracies Institute, Simon Fraser University
- Professor Eve V. Clark, Richard W Lyman Professor Emerita, Professor of Linguistics and Symbolic Systems, Stanford University
- Professor Janet Currie, Henry Putnam Professor of Economics and Public Affairs, Princeton University
- Professor Steven Feld, Distinguished Professor of Anthropology Emeritus, University of New Mexico
- Professor Gerd Gigerenzer, Director Emeritus, Max Planck Institute for Human Development, Berlin; Director, Harding Center for Risk Literacy, University of Potsdam, and Vice-President European Research Council (ERC)
- Professor Robert Grant, SDA Professor of Strategic and Entrepreneurial Management Emeritus, Bocconi University
- Professor Saidiya Hartman, University Professor, Department of English and Comparative Literature, Columbia University
- Professor Ayhan Kaya, Director, European Institute, Director, Jean Monnet Centre of Excellence, Senior Lecturer, Istanbul Bilgi University
- Professor Thomas Keymer, Chancellor Henry N R Jackman University Professor of English, University of Toronto
- Professor Catharine MacKinnon, Elizabeth A Long Professor of Law, University of Michigan Law School; The James Barr Ames Visiting Professor of Law, Harvard Law School
- Professor Koji Mizoguchi FSA, Professor, Faculty of Social and Cultural Studies, Kyushu University
- Professor Zhenzhao Nie MAE, Yunshan Chair Professor, Guangdong University of Foreign Studies; Emeritus Professor, Zhejiang University
- Professor Pippa Norris, Paul F McGuire Lecturer in Comparative Politics, HKS and Faculty Affiliate in the Government Department, Harvard Kennedy School
- Professor Francis B. Nyamnjoh, Professor of Social Anthropology, University of Cape Town
- Professor Susan O'Connor, Distinguished Professor, School of Culture, History and Language, Australian National University
- Professor Jennifer Roberts, Drew Gilpin Faust Professor of the Humanities, Harvard University
- Professor Kirsi Salonen, Professor of Medieval History, Department of Archaeology, History, Cultural Studies and Religion, University of Bergen
- Professor Petra Sijpesteijn, Professor of Arabic, Leiden University
- Professor Catherine E. Snow, John and Elisabeth Hobbs Professor of Cognition and Education, Harvard Graduate School of Education
- Professor Guy G. Stroumsa, Martin Buber Professor Emeritus of Comparative Religion, The Hebrew University of Jerusalem; Professor Emeritus of the Study of the Abrahamic Religions, University of Oxford
- Professor David Der-wei Wang, Edward C Henderson Professor of Chinese Literature and Comparative Literature, Harvard University

Honorary fellows

- Ms Patricia Barker CBE, FRSL, British writer and novelist
- Professor Dame Sonia Boyce DBE, OBE, RA, Professor of Black Art and Design, University of the Arts London
- Sir Isaac Julien CBE, RA, Filmmaker and installation artist; Distinguished Professor of the Arts, University of California Santa Cruz
- Mr Fergal Keane OBE, Special Correspondent, BBC News

== 2023 ==
On 21 July 2023, the following were elected to the fellowship; 52 fellows, 30 corresponding fellows, and 4 honorary fellows.

Fellows

- Professor Louise Amoore, Durham University
- Professor Clare Anderson, Leicester Institute for Advanced Studies
- Professor Louise Archer, University College London
- Professor Helen Beebee, University of Leeds
- Professor Robert Bickers, University of Bristol
- Professor Wendy Carlin, University College London
- Professor Emilios Christodoulidis, University of Glasgow
- Professor Katherine Clarke, University of Oxford
- Professor Neta Crawford, University of Oxford
- Professor Mark Crinson, Birkbeck, University of London
- Professor Jonathan Cross, University of Oxford
- Professor Mark Edwards, University of Oxford
- Professor Georgina Endfield, University of Liverpool
- Professor Saul Estrin, London School of Economics
- Professor Annabelle Gawer, University of Surrey
- Professor Rosalind Gill, City, University of London
- Professor Laura Gowing, King's College, London
- Professor Pekka Hämäläinen, University of Oxford
- Professor Helena Hamerow, University of Oxford
- Professor Nicholas Harrison, King's College London
- Professor Kate Hunt, University of Stirling
- Professor Timothy Insoll, University of Exeter
- Professor Peter John, King's College London
- Professor Dafydd Johnston, University of Wales Trinity St David
- Professor Ananya Jahanara Kabir, King's College London
- Professor Tobias Kelly, University of Edinburgh
- Professor Elizabeth Lambourn, De Montfort University
- Professor Simon Marginson, University of Oxford
- Professor Susan Marks, London School of Economics
- Professor Sharon Monteith, Nottingham Trent University
- Professor Debra Myhill, University of Exeter
- Professor Lúcia Nagib, University of Reading
- Professor Kate Nation, University of Oxford
- Professor David Nelken, King's College London
- Professor David Owen, University of Southampton
- Professor Martin Pickering, University of Edinburgh
- Professor Nicholas Pidgeon, Cardiff University
- Professor Jaideep Prabhu, University of Cambridge
- Professor Tina K. Ramnarine, Royal Holloway, University of London
- Professor Jennifer Richards, Newcastle University
- Professor Ian Rutherford, University of Reading
- Professor Susie Scott, University of Sussex
- Professor Devyani Sharma, Queen Mary University of London
- Professor Nicolai Sinai, University of Oxford
- Professor Sujit Sivasundaram, University of Cambridge
- Professor John Skorupski, University of St Andrews
- Professor Lyndsey Stonebridge, University of Birmingham
- Professor Jane Stuart-Smith, University of Glasgow
- Professor Patrick Sturgis, London School of Economics
- Professor Daniel Wakelin, University of Oxford
- Professor Frank Windmeijer, University of Oxford
- Professor Jonathan Wolff, University of Oxford

Corresponding fellows

- Professor Mats Alvesson, Professor of Business Administration, Lund University
- Professor Aharon Barak, Professor of Commercial Law, Reichman University
- Professor Dipesh Chakrabarty, Lawrence A Kimpton Distinguished Service Professor of History, South Asian Languages and Civilizations, University of Chicago
- Judge Hilary Charlesworth, Professor of International Law, University of Melbourne; Judge, International Court of Justice, The Hague
- Professor Ruth DeFries, University Professor and Denning Family Professor of Sustainable Development, Columbia University
- Professor John Dryzek, Distinguished Professor, Centre for Deliberative Democracy and Global Governance, University of Canberra
- Professor Kathy Eden, Chavkin Family Professor of English and Professor of Classics, Columbia University
- Professor Finbarr Barry Flood, Founder-director of Silsila, Center for Material Histories; William R Kenan, Jr Professor of the Humanities, Institute of Fine Arts and Department of Art History, New York University
- Professor Emily Greenwood, Professor of the Classics and Comparative Literature, Harvard University
- Professor Kris Gutiérrez, Carol Liu Professor of Education and Associate Dean of the School of Education, University of California, Berkeley
- Professor Michael Hogg, Professor of Social Psychology, Claremont Graduate University
- Professor Salima Ikram, Distinguished University Professor of Egyptology, American University in Cairo
- Professor Rahel Jaeggi, Professor of Social and Political Philosophy, Humboldt University, Berlin
- Professor Peggy Kamuf, Professor Emerita of French and Comparative Literature, University of Southern California
- Professor Ayesha Kidwai, Professor, Centre for Linguistics, School of Language, Literature and Culture Studies, Jawaharlal Nehru University
- Professor Wolfgang Künne, Professor Emeritus of Philosophy, University of Hamburg
- Professor Adam Lefstein, Morton L Mandel Director, Seymour Fox School of Education, Hebrew University of Jerusalem
- Professor Achille Mbembe, Research Professor in History and Politics, Wits Institute for Social and Economic Research (WISER), University of the Witwatersrand
- Professor Christine Moorman, T Austin Finch Sr Professor of Business Administrationm Fuqua School of Business, Duke University
- Professor Stephen Morris, Peter A Diamond Professor of Economics, Massachusetts Institute of Technology
- Professor Fred Moten, Professor, Department of Performance Studies, Tisch School of the Arts, New York University
- Professor Laïla Nehmé, Senior Research Fellow, Centre national de la recherche scientifique (CNRS)
- Professor Jane Ohlmeyer, Erasmus Smith's Professor of Modern History (1762), Trinity College Dublin
- Professor Sherry Ortner, Distinguished Professor Emerita of Anthropology, University of California
- Professor Russell Poldrack, Albert Ray Lang Professor of Psychology, Stanford University
- Professor Sabine Schmidtke, Professor of Islamic Intellectual History, Institute for Advanced Study, Princeton
- Professor Theda Skocpol, Victor S. Thomas Professor of Government and Sociology, Harvard University
- Professor Margaret Slade, Professor Emeritus, Vancouver School of Economics, University of British Columbia
- Professor Karl Ubl, Professor of Medieval History, University of Cologne
- Professor Alison Wylie, Canada Research Chair and Professor of Philosophy, University of British Columbia

Honorary fellows

- Sir John Akomfrah, film-maker, artist and writer
- Professor Abdulrazak Gurnah, Emeritus Professor of English and Postcolonial Literatures, University of Kent
- Professor Jackie Kay, Professor of Creative Writing, University of Salford; Cultural Fellow, Glasgow Caledonian University
- Professor Philippe Sands, Professor of Public Understanding of Law, University College London

== 2022 ==
On 22 July 2022, the following were elected to the fellowship; 52 fellows, 29 corresponding fellows, and 4 honorary fellows.

Fellows

- Professor David M. Anderson, University of Warwick
- Professor Susan Banducci, University of Exeter
- Professor Richard Bellamy, University College London
- Professor Barbara Bombi, University of Kent
- Professor Benjamin Bowling, King's College London
- Professor Richard Bradley, London School of Economics and Political Science
- Professor Theresa Buckland, University of Roehampton
- Professor Simon Burgess, University of Bristol
- Professor Quassim Cassam, University of Warwick
- Professor Virginia Cox, Trinity College, Cambridge
- Professor Jacqueline Coyle-Shapiro, London School of Economics and Political Science
- Professor Daniel Freeman, University of Oxford
- Dr Melanie Giles FSA, University of Manchester
- Professor Simon Gilson, University of Oxford and Magdalen College, Oxford
- Professor Lucy Green, Institute of Education, University College London
- Professor Edith Hall, University of Durham
- Professor Penny Harvey, University of Manchester
- Professor Rik Henson, University of Cambridge
- Professor Pat Hudson, Cardiff University
- Professor Cristina Iannelli, University of Edinburgh
- Professor Ian Jewitt, Nuffield College, Oxford
- Professor Andrew Jordan, University of East Anglia
- Professor Heonik Kwon, Trinity College, Cambridge
- Professor Anna Lawson, University of Leeds
- Professor Sally Maitlis, University of Oxford
- Professor Robin Mansell FAcSS, London School of Economics and Political Science
- Professor Nicola Miller, University College London
- Professor Anthony Milton, University of Sheffield
- Professor Upamanyu Pablo Mukherjee, Warwick University
- Professor Henry Overman, London School of Economics
- Professor Hilary Owen, University of Oxford and University of Manchester
- Professor Andrew Peacock FSA, University of St Andrews
- Professor Cathy Price FRS, FMedSci, University College London
- Professor Rebecca Probert, University of Exeter
- Professor Jonathan Rigg, University of Bristol
- Professor Eleanor Robson, University College London
- Professor Kathryn M. Rudy FRSE, University of St Andrews
- Professor Valerie Rumbold, University of Birmingham
- Professor Monika Schmid, University of York
- Professor Uta Schönberg, University College London
- Professor Marie Louise Stig Sørensen FSA, University of Cambridge
- Professor Michael Squire, King's College London
- Professor Catherine Steel, University of Glasgow
- Professor David Storey OBE, University of Sussex Business School
- Revd Professor John Swinton FRSE, RMN, RNMD, University of Aberdeen
- Professor Sylvia Walby OBE, FAcSS, FRSA, City, University of London
- Professor David Willis, University of Oxford
- Professor Jane Wills, University of Exeter
- Professor Emma Wilson, University of Cambridge
- Professor Andrew Wood FRHS, Durham University
- Professor Linda Woodhead MBE, King's College, London
- Professor Mark Wynn, University of Oxford.

Corresponding fellows

- Professor Rustom Bharucha, Jawaharlal Nehru University
- Professor Timothy Brook, University of British Columbia
- Professor Linda Chisholm, University of Johannesburg
- Professor Daniel K. L. Chua, The University of Hong Kong
- Professor Dr Irene de Jong, University of Amsterdam
- Professor Dr Mayke de Jong, Utrecht University
- Professor Dr Mamadou Diawara, Goethe University of Frankfurt
- Professor Jennifer Eberhardt, Stanford University
- Professor Barry Eichengreen, University of California, Berkeley
- Professor Suraiya Faroqhi, Ibn Haldun University
- Professor Simon Gikandi, Princeton University
- Professor Andre Gingrich, Austrian Academy of Sciences
- Professor Evelyn Goh, The Australian National University
- Professor Sari Hanafi, American University of Beirut
- Professor Mireille Hildebrandt, Vrije Universiteit and Radboud University
- Professor Victoria Kahn, University of California, Berkeley
- Professor Dr Pauline Kleingeld, University of Groningen
- Professor Ann Langley FRSC, HEC Montréal and Warwick Business School
- Professor Margaret Levi, Stanford University
- Professor Diana Liverman, University of Arizona
- Professor Deborah Mayo, Virginia Tech
- Professor Chika Okeke-Agulu, Princeton University
- Professor Shanti Pappu, Sharma Centre for Heritage Education and Krea University
- Professor Daniel Potts, New York University
- Professor Wlodek Rabinowicz, Lund University
- Professor John Rickford, Stanford University
- Professor Issa Shivji, University of Dar-Es-Salaam
- Professor Kathryn Tanner, Yale University Divinity School
- Professor Amy Stuart Wells, Columbia University.

Honorary fellows

- Professor Dame Anne Johnson, Professor of Infectious Disease Epidemiology, Co-Director UCL Health of the Public; President, UK Academy of Medical Sciences
- Bronwen Maddox, Director, Institute for Government; incoming Director, Chatham House
- Professor David Olusoga, Professor of Public History, University of Manchester
- Professor Benjamin Zephaniah, Professor of Poetry and Creative Writing, Brunel University; Visiting Professor, De Montfort University

== 2021 ==
On 22 July 2021, the following were elected to the fellowship; 52 fellows, 29 corresponding fellows, and 3 honorary fellows.

Fellows

- Professor Laura Bear, London School of Economics and Political Science
- Professor Duncan Bell, University of Cambridge
- Professor Jean-Pierre BenoÎt, London Business School
- Professor Catherine Boone, London School of Economics and Political Science
- Professor Timothy T. Clark, British Museum
- Professor Joanne Conaghan, FAcSS, University of Bristol
- Professor Davina Cooper, King's College London
- Professor Julia Crick, King's College London
- Professor David Edgerton, King's College London
- Professor Catharine Edwards, University of London
- Professor Adrian Favell, University of Leeds
- Professor Charles Forsdick, University of Liverpool
- Professor Becky Francis, The Education Endowment Foundation
- Professor Sarah Franklin, FRSB, FAcSS, University of Cambridge
- Professor Julian Franks, London Business School
- Professor Anne Gerritsen, University of Warwick
- Professor David Gillborn, FAcSS, FRSA, University of Birmingham
- Professor Elaine Graham, University of Chester
- Professor Andrew Hadfield, University of Sussex
- Professor John Haldon, University of Birmingham
- Professor Anne Haour, University of East Anglia
- Professor Vernon Henderson, London School of Economics and Political Science
- Professor David Hesmondhalgh, University of Leeds
- Professor Ben Highmore, University of Sussex
- Professor Anders Holmberg, Newcastle University
- Professor Richard Holton, University of Cambridge
- Professor Gregory Hutchinson, University of Oxford
- Professor David Knights, Lancaster University
- Professor Susanne Kord, University College London
- Professor Jouni Kuha, London School of Economics and Political Science
- Professor Li Wei, FAcSS, MAE, University College London
- Professor Samuel Lieu, FAHA, FRSN, FHKAH (Hon), FSA, FRHistS, University of Cambridge
- Professor Alison Light, University of Oxford
- Professor Javed Majeed, King's College London
- Professor Roger Matthews, University of Reading
- Professor Robert J. Mayhew, University of Bristol
- Professor Susan Michie, University College London
- Professor Sarah Nettleton, University of York
- Professor Barbara Petrongolo, University of Oxford
- Professor Andrew Pettegree, University of St Andrews
- Professor Dorothy Price, University of Bristol
- Professor Shirin Rai, FAcSS, University of Warwick
- Professor Paul Roberts, University of Nottingham
- Professor Mari Sako, University of Oxford
- Professor Andrew Steptoe, FMedSci, University College London
- Professor Sacha Stern, University College London
- Professor Helen Steward, University of Leeds
- Professor Galin Tihanov, Queen Mary University of London
- Professor Ianthi Tsimpli, University of Cambridge
- Professor Laura Tunbridge, University of Oxford
- Professor Peter Tymms, University of Durham
- Professor Amanda Vickery, Queen Mary University of London.

Corresponding fellows

- Professor Daron Acemoglu, Massachusetts Institute of Technology
- Professor Aleida Assmann, University of Konstanz
- Professor David Avrom Bell, Princeton University
- Professor Sukanta Chaudhuri, Jadavpur University
- Professor Eveline Crone, Leiden University
- Professor Barbara Czarniawska, University of Gothenburg
- Professor John M. Dillon, Trinity College Dublin
- Professor David Dyzenhaus, University of Toronto
- Professor Katalin É. Kiss, Hungarian Research Center for Linguistics
- Professor Susanna Elm, University of California Berkeley
- Professor Marcella Frangipane, Sapienza University of Rome
- Professor Henry Louis Gates Jr, Harvard University
- Professor Katherine Gibson, Western Sydney University
- Professor Annette Gordon-Reed, Harvard University
- Professor Sergey Ivanov, National Research University, Higher Economic School, Moscow
- Professor Sarah Kenderdine, École polytechnique fédérale de Lausanne
- Professor Philip Kitcher, Columbia University
- Professor Gloria Ladson-Billings, University of Wisconsin-Madison
- Professor Pratap Bhanu Mehta, Princeton University; Centre for Policy Research, New Delhi
- Professor Kobena Mercer, Bard College
- Professor Wanda J. Orlikowski, MIT Sloan School of Management
- Professor Şevket Pamuk, Boğaziçi University, Istanbul
- Professor Adam Przeworski, New York University
- Professor Xinjiang Rong, Peking University
- Professor Gayatri Chakravorty Spivak, Columbia University
- Professor Stefan Vogenauer, Max Planck Institute for Legal History and Legal Theory, Frankfurt
- Professor Elżbieta Witkowska-Zaremba, Institute of Arts, Polish Academy of Sciences
- Professor Brenda Yeoh, National University of Singapore
- Professor Barbie Zelizer, University of Pennsylvania

Honorary fellows

- Professor Simon Armitage CBE, FRSL, University of Leeds
- Baroness Minouche Shafik, London School of Economics and Political Science
- Darren Walker, President of the Ford Foundation

== 2020 ==
On 24 July 2020, the following were elected to the fellowship; 52 fellows, 30 corresponding fellows, and 4 honorary fellows.

Fellows

- Anna Sapir Abulafia, University of Oxford
- David Adger, Queen Mary University of London
- Madawi John M. G. Barclayl-Rasheed, London School of Economics
- Charles Baden-Fuller, City University
- John Barclay, Durham University
- Catherine Barnard, University of Cambridge
- Ian Bateman, University of Exeter
- Gurminder Bhambra, University of Sussex
- Michael Billig, University of Loughborough
- Dame Sue Black, Lancaster University
- Amy Bogaard, University of Oxford
- Colin Burrow, University of Oxford
- Martin Carver, University of York
- Martin Clayton, Durham University
- Ursula Coope, University of Oxford
- Giancarlo Corsetti, University of Cambridge
- Patrick Dunleavy, London School of Economics
- Rebecca Earle, University of Warwick
- Khaled Fahmy, University of Cambridge
- Paul Fiddes, University of Oxford
- Regenia Gagnier, University of Exeter
- Mark Harrison, University of Warwick
- Katherine Hawley, University of St Andrews
- Richard Hyman, London School of Economics
- Paula Jarzabkowski, City University
- Judith Jesch, University of Nottingham
- Stathis Kalyvas, University of Oxford
- Daniel Karlin, University of Bristol
- Kieran McEvoy, Queen's University, Belfast
- James Nazroo, University of Manchester
- Polly O'Hanlon, University of Oxford
- Andrew Pickles, King's College London
- Christopher Pinney, University College London
- Sarah A. Radcliffe, University of Cambridge
- Rick Rawlings, University College London
- Nikolas Rose, King's College London
- Meg Russell, University College London
- James Secord, University of Cambridge
- Constantine Sedikides, University of Southampton
- Simon Shepherd, Central School of Speech and Drama
- Antonella Sorace, University of Edinburgh
- Penny Summerfield, University of Manchester
- Kathy Sylva, University of Oxford (Jesus College)
- Rosalind Thomas, University of Oxford
- Isabel Torres, Queen's University Belfast
- Elaine Unterhalter, University College London
- Caroline van Eck, University of Cambridge
- Essi Viding, University College London
- Timothy Whitmarsh, University of Cambridge
- Andreas Willi, University of Oxford
- Clair Wills, University of Cambridge
- Christopher Woolgar, University of Southampton

Corresponding fellows

- Elizabeth S. Anderson, University of Michigan
- Nicole Bériou, Institut de Recherche et d'Histoire des Textes
- Homi K. Bhabha, Harvard University
- Bea Cantillon, University of Antwerp
- Kathleen Coleman, Harvard University
- Jonathan Culler, Cornell University
- Anne Cutler, University of Western Sydney
- Joan DeJean, University of Pennsylvania
- Bénédicte Fauvarque-Cosson, Conseillère d'Etat
- Amy Finkelstein, Massachusetts Institute of Technology
- Rainer Forst, Goethe-University
- Jan-Eric Gustafsson, University of Gothenburg
- Alice Harris, University of Massachusetts-Amherst
- Caroline Hoxby, Stanford University
- Sheila Jasanoff, Harvard University
- Geoffrey Jones, Harvard University
- Thomas Kaufmann, University of Göttingen
- Kristian Kristiansen, University of Gothenburg
- Ngaire Naffine, University of Adelaide
- Gülru Necipoğlu, Harvard University
- Charles A. Nelson III, Harvard University
- Jamie Peck, University of British Columbia
- Susan Pedersen, University of Columbia
- Thomas Piketty, Paris School of Economics; EHESS
- Sheldon Pollock, Columbia University
- Walter W. Powell, Stanford University
- Frederick Schauer, University of Virginia Law School
- David Dean Shulman, University Jerusalem
- Kathryn Sikkink, Harvard Kennedy School
- Elliott Sober, University of Wisconsin-Madison

Honorary Fellows

- Robin Jackson CBE, Former Chief Executive of the British Academy
- Bridget Kendall MBE, Journalist, Diplomatic Correspondent, University of Cambridge
- Mary Robinson, Adjunct Professor of Climate Justice and Former President of the Republic of Ireland, Trinity College Dublin
- Gary Younge FAcSS, Professor of Sociology, University of Manchester
