= List of female fellows of the British Academy =

The Fellowship of the British Academy consists of world-leading scholars and researchers in the humanities and social sciences. A varying number of fellows are elected each year in July at the academy's annual general meeting. The first woman was elected to the fellowship in 1931.

== Elected in 1930s ==
Name	Year elected	Disciplinary section(s)	Notes
Beatrice Webb	1931	Economics	

== Elected in 1940s ==
Name	Year elected	Disciplinary section(s)	Notes
Gertrude Caton Thompson	1944	Archaeology	
Helen Cam	1945	Medieval studies	
Helen Darbishire	1947		

== Elected in 1950s ==
Name	Year elected	Disciplinary section(s)	Notes
Professor Jocelyn Toynbee	1952	Archaeology; Classical antiquity	
Doris Mary Stenton	1953	Medieval studies	
Dame Lucy Sutherland	1954		
Professor Dorothy Whitelock	1956		
Professor A. M. Dale	1957	Classics	

== Elected in 1960s ==
Name	Year elected	Disciplinary section(s)	Notes
Eleanora Carus-Wilson	1963	Economic history	
Dame Margery Perham	1961		
Mary Lascelles	1962		
Beryl Smalley	1963		
Kathleen Tillotson	1965		
Audrey Richards	1967	Anthropology	
Margaret Whinney	1967	History of art	
Dame Frances Yates	1967		

== Elected in 1970s ==
Name	Year elected	Disciplinary section(s)	Notes
Professor Dominica Legge	1974		
Marjorie Reeves	1974		
Joan Thirsk	1974		

== Elected in 1980s ==
Name	Year elected	Disciplinary section(s)	Notes
Averil Cameron	1981	Late antique and Byzantine studies	
Joyce Reynolds	1982	Classical antiquity	
Professor Margaret Boden	1983	Philosophy; Psychology	
Professor Anne Hudson	1988	Medieval studies	
Elizabeth Rawson	1988	Classicist	

== Elected in 1990s ==
Name	Year elected	Disciplinary section(s)	Notes
Professor Janet Bately	1990	Medieval studies	
Dr Margaret Bent	1993	Medieval studies History of art and music	
Dr Lotte Hellinga	1990	Early modern languages and literatures to 1830	
Professor Isabel de Madariaga	1990		
Dr Stephanie West	1990	Classics	
Professor Jose Harris	1993		
Dr Caroline Bammel	1994		
Professor Margaret Spufford	1995		
Professor Lorraine Tyler	1995		
Professor Dawn Adès	1996	History of art and music	
Professor Ruth Finnegan	1996		
Professor Dorothy J. Thompson	1996	Classics and Ancient History	
Professor Dame Olwen Hufton	1998	Early Modern history to 1850	
Professor Elizabeth McGrath	1998	History of art and music	
Professor P. E. Easterling	1998	Classics	
Professor Ann Moss	1998	Early modern languages and literatures to 1830	
Professor Dame Vicki Bruce	1999	Psychology	
Professor Linda Colley	1999	History	
Professor Wendy Davies	1992	Medieval studies Archaeology	
Professor Carol Harlow	1999	Law	
Dr Georgina Herrmann	1999	Archaeology	
Professor Marian Hobson	1999	French studies	
Professor Wendy James	1999	Anthropology and geography Archaeology	
Professor Melveena McKendrick	1999	Early modern languages and literatures to 1830	

== Elected in 2000s ==
Name	Year elected	Disciplinary section(s)	Notes
Professor Rosemary Ashton	2000	Modern languages, literatures and other media from 1830; Modern history from 1850	
Professor Celia Britton	2000	Modern languages, literatures and other media from 1830	
Professor Angela Leighton	2000	Modern languages, literatures and other media from 1830	
Professor Amélie Kuhrt	2001	The social, cultural and political history of the ancient Middle East (c.3000-100 BC), especially the Assyrian, Babylonian, Persian and Seleucid empires	
Professor Diana Greenway	2001	Medieval studies	
Professor Dame Hermione Lee	2001	Modern languages, literatures and other media from 1830	
Professor Marilyn Butler	2002	English	
Professor Megan Vaughan	2002	Africa, Asia and the Middle East; Modern history from 1850	
Professor Isobel Armstrong	2003	Modern languages, literatures and other media from 1830	
Professor Karin Barber	2003	Africa, Asia and the Middle East; Anthropology and geography	
Professor Sarah Broadie	2003	Philosophy	
Professor Elizabeth Boa	2003	Modern languages, literatures and other media from 1830	
Professor Anne Phillips	2003	Political studies: political theory, government and international relations	
Professor Ann Jefferson	2004	Modern languages, literatures and other media from 1830	
Professor Maxine Berg	2004	Economics and economic history Modern history from 1850	
Professor Annette Kuhn	2004	Modern languages, literatures and other media from 1830	
Professor Jane Lewis	2004	Sociology, demography and social statistics	
Professor Susan Mendus	2004	Political studies: political theory, government and international relations	
Professor Sheilagh Ogilvie	2004	Economics and economic history	
Professor Frances Young	2004	Theology and religious studies	
Professor Sandra Fredman	2005	Law	
Professor Miriam Glucksmann	2005	Sociology, demography and social statistics	
Professor Dawn Oliver	2005	Law	
Professor Jo Labanyi	2005	Modern languages, literatures and other media from 1830	
Professor Helen Cooper	2006	Medieval studies	
Professor Dame Rosemary Cramp	2006	Archaeology	
Professor Jill Rubery	2006	Management and business studies; Sociology, demography and social statistics	
Professor Rachel Bowlby	2007	Modern languages, literatures and other media from 1830	
Professor Bryony Coles	2007	Archaeology	
Professor Catriona Kelly	2007	Modern languages, literatures and other media from 1830	
Professor Joni Lovenduski	2007	Political studies: political theory, government and international relations	
Professor Dame Henrietta Moore	2007	Africa, Asia and the Middle East; Anthropology and geography	
Professor Genevra Richardson	2007	Law	
Dr Zara Steiner	2007	Modern history from 1850	
Professor Sara Arber	2008	Sociology, demography and social statistics	
Professor Roberta Gilchrist	2008	History of art and music Archaeology	
Professor Ruth Mace	2008	Anthropology and geography	
Professor Lisa Tickner	2008	History of art and music	
Professor Sarah Worthington	2009	Law	

== Elected in 2010s ==
Name	Year elected	Disciplinary section(s)	Notes
Professor Mary Beard	2010	Classical Antiquity	
Professor Rosemary Crompton	2010	Sociology, demography and social statistics	
Professor Cecilia Heyes	2010	Philosophy; Psychology	
Professor Emilie Savage-Smith	2010	Africa, Asia and the Middle East	
Professor Jenny Cheshire	2011	Linguistics and Philology; Education	
Professor Cécile Fabre	2011	Political studies: political theory, government and international relations Philosophy	
Professor Laura Marcus	2011	Modern languages, literatures and other media from 1830	
Professor Susan Owens	2011	Anthropology and geography	
Professor Kathleen Kiernan	2012	Sociology, demography and social statistics	
Professor Gillian Clark	2012	Theology and Religious Studies; Classical Antiquity	
Professor Bencie Woll	2012	Linguistics and philology Psychology	
Professor Lucia Zedner	2012	Law	
Professor Sarah Birch	2013	Political studies: political theory, government and international relations Philosophy	
Professor Stella Bruzzi	2013	Modern languages, literatures and other media from 1830	
Professor Katharine Ellis	2013	History of art and music	
Professor Eilís Ferran	2013	Law	
Professor Diana Knight	2013	Modern languages, literatures and other media from 1830	
Professor Cécile Laborde	2013	Political studies: political theory, government and international relations; theology and religious studies	
Professor Jenny Ozga	2013	Sociology, demography and social statistics; education group	
Professor Lucrezia Reichlin	2013	Economics and economic history	
Professor Joanne Scott	2013	Law	
Professor Janet Watson	2013	Africa, Asia and the Middle East; Linguistics and philology	
Professor Ingrid De Smet	2014	Classical Antiquity; Early Modern Languages and Literatures to 1830	
Professor Susanne Bobzien	2014	Philosophy	
Professor Joanna Bourke	2014	Modern history from 1850	
Professor Margot Brazier	2014	Law	
Professor Eleanor Dickey	2014	Classical antiquity Linguistics and philology	
Professor Rae Langton	2014	Political studies: political theory, government and international relations Philosophy	
Professor Judith Lieu	2014	Classical antiquity Theology and religious studies	
Professor Cecilia Trifogli	2014	Philosophy; Medieval studies	
Professor Janette Atkinson	2015	Psychology	
Professor Oriana Bandiera	2015	Economics and economic history	
Professor Julia Black	2015	Law	
Professor Dawn Chatty	2015	Anthropology and geography Africa, Asia and the Middle East	
Professor Julia Barrow	2016	Medieval studies	
Professor Robyn Carston	2016	Linguistics and philology	
Professor Patricia Clavin	2016	Modern history from 1850	
Professor Jane Duckett	2016	Political studies: political theory, government and international relations	
Professor Nancy Edwards	2016	Archaeology	
Professor Judith Freedman	2016	Law	
Professor Miranda Fricker	2016	Political studies: political theory, government and international relations	
Professor Hilary Graham	2016	Sociology, demography and social statistics	
Professor Lorna Hutson	2016	Early modern languages and literatures to 1830	
Professor Emily Jackson	2016	Law	
Professor Susanne Küchler	2016	Anthropology and geography	
Professor Nilli Lavie	2016	Psychology	
Professor Elizabeth Eva Leach	2016	History of art and music	
Professor Catherine Merridale	2016	Modern history from 1850	
Professor Catherine Morgan	2016	Classical antiquity	
Professor Sophie Scott	2016	Psychology	
Professor Judy Wajcman	2016	Sociology, demography and social statistics	
Professor Patricia Waugh	2016	Modern languages, literatures and other media from 1830	
Professor Fiona Williams	2016	Sociology, demography and social statistics	
Professor Alison Bashford	2017		
Professor Mary Daly	2017		
Professor Gillian Douglas	2017		
Professor Emily Grundy	2017		
Professor Sara Hobolt	2017		
Professor Jennifer Hornsby	2017		
Professor Melissa Leach	2017		
Professor M. M. McCabe	2017		
Professor Angela McRobbie	2017		
Professor Lynne Murray	2017		
Professor Francesca Orsini	2017		
Professor Ulinka Rublack	2017		
Professor Barbara Sahakian	2017		
Professor Catriona Seth	2017	Early modern languages and literatures to 1830	
Professor Anna Vignoles	2017		
Dr Teresa Webber	2017		
Professor Lynn Abrams	2018	Modern history	
Professor Sarah-Jayne Blakemore	2018	Cognitive neuroscience	
Professor Joya Chatterji	2018	South Asian history	
Professor Veronica Della Dora	2018	Human geography	
Professor Tia DeNora	2018	Sociology of music	
Professor Emerita Catherine Hall	2018	Modern British social and cultural history	
Canon Professor Carol Harrison	2018	Divinity	
Professor Alison Liebling	2018	Criminology and criminal justice	
Professor Elena Lieven	2018	Psychology	
Professor Jane Lightfoot	2018	Greek literature	
Professor Sonia Livingstone	2018	Social psychology	
Professor Eleanor Maguire	2018	Cognitive neuroscience	
Professor Melinda Mills	2018	Sociology	
Professor Niamh Moloney	2018	Financial markets law	
Professor Catherine Nash	2018	Human geography	
Professor Lynda Nead	2018	History of art	
Professor Wen-chin Ouyang	2018	Arabic and comparative literature	
Professor Alexandra Shepard	2018	Gender history	
Professor Helen Small	2018	English literature	
Professor Fiona Stafford	2018	English language and literature	
Professor Judith Still	2018	French and critical theory	
Professor Silvana Tenreyro	2018	Economics	
Professor Gill Valentine	2018		
Professor Georgina Waylen	2018	Politics	
Professor Christina Boswell	2019		
Professor Charlotte Brunsdon	2019		
Professor Harriet Bulkeley	2019		
The Revd Professor Sarah Coakley	2019		
Dr Annabel Gallop	2019		
Professor Susan Golombok	2019		
Professor Emily Gowers	2019		
Professor Louise Gullifer	2019		
Professor Clare Harris	2019		
Professor Rebecca Herissone	2019		
Professor Caroline Heycock	2019		
Professor Herminia Ibarra	2019		
Professor Susan James	2019		
Professor Deborah James	2019		
Professor Esther Leslie	2019		
Professor Julia Lovell	2019		
Professor Helen Margetts	2019		
Professor Jennifer Mason	2019		
Dr Margaret Meyer	2019		
Professor Nicola Milner	2019		
Professor Irina Nikolaeva	2019		
Professor Katie Scott	2019		
Dr Alison Sheridan	2019		
Professor Elizabeth Shove	2019	Sociology	
Professor Tiffany Stern	2019		

== Elected in 2020s ==
Name	Year elected	Disciplinary section(s)	Notes
Anna Sapir Abulafia	2020	Theology and Religious Studies; Medieval Studies	
Professor Catherine Barnard	2020	European Union law	
Professor Gurminder Bhambra	2020	Postcolonial and decolonial studies	
Professor Dame Sue Black	2020	Forensic anthropology	
Professor Amy Bogaard	2020	Archaeology	
Professor Ursula Coope	2020	Classical Antiquity; Philosophy	
Professor Rebecca Earle	2020	Early Modern History to 1850; Modern History from 1850	
Professor Regenia Gagnier	2020	Modern Languages, Literatures and other Media from 1830	
Professor Katherine Hawley	2020	Philosophy	
Professor Paula Jarzabkowski	2020	Management and business studies	
Professor Judith Jesch	2020	Medieval Studies	
Professor Polly O'Hanlon	2020	Africa, Asia and the Middle East; Modern History from 1850	
Professor Sarah A. Radcliffe	2020	Anthropology and Geography	
Professor Meg Russell	2020	Political Studies: Political Theory, Government and International Relations	
Professor Antonella Sorace	2020	Linguistics and Philology	
Professor Penny Summerfield	2020	Modern History from 1850	
Professor Kathy Sylva	2020	Education	
Professor Rosalind Thomas	2020	Classical Antiquity	
Professor Isabel Torres	2020	Early Modern Languages and Literatures to 1830	
Professor Elaine Unterhalter	2020	Education	
Professor Caroline van Eck	2020	History of Art and Music	
Professor Essi Viding	2020	Psychology	
Professor Clair Wills	2020	Modern Languages, Literatures and other Media from 1830; Modern History from 1850	
Professor Laura Bear	2021		
Professor Catherine Boone	2021		
Professor Joanne Conaghan	2021		
Professor Davina Cooper	2021		
Professor Julia Crick	2021		
Professor Catharine Edwards	2021		
Professor Becky Francis	2021		
Professor Sarah Franklin	2021		
Professor Anne Gerritsen	2021		
Professor Elaine Graham	2021		
Professor Anne Haour	2021		
Professor Susanne Kord	2021		
Professor Alison Light	2021		
Professor Susan Michie	2021		
Professor Sarah Nettleton	2021		
Professor Barbara Petrongolo	2021		
Professor Dorothy Price	2021		
Professor Shirin Rai	2021		
Professor Mari Sako	2021		
Professor Helen Steward	2021		
Professor Ianthi Maria Tsimpli	2021		
Professor Laura Tunbridge	2021		
Professor Amanda Vickery	2021		
Professor Susan Banducci	2022	Political Studies: Political Theory, Government and International Relations	
Professor Barbara Bombi	2022	Medieval Studies	
Professor Theresa Buckland	2022	Culture, Media and Performance	
Professor Virginia Cox	2022	Early Modern Languages and Literatures to 1830	
Professor Jacqueline Coyle-Shapiro	2022	Management and Business Studies	
Dr Melanie Giles	2022	Archaeology	
Professor Lucy Green	2022	History of Art and Music	
Professor Edith Hall	2022	Classical Antiquity	
Professor Penny Harvey	2022	Anthropology and Geography	
Professor Pat Hudson	2022	Economics and Economic History; Sociology, Demography and Social Statistics	
Professor Cristina Iannelli	2022	Education	
Professor Anna Lawson	2022	Law	
Professor Sally Maitlis	2022	Management and Business Studies	
Professor Robin Mansell	2022	Culture, Media and Performance	
Professor Nicola Miller	2022	Modern History from 1850	
Professor Hilary Owen	2022	Modern Languages, Literatures and other Media from 1830	
Professor Cathy Price	2022	Psychology	
Professor Rebecca Probert	2022	Law	
Professor Eleanor Robson	2022	Africa, Asia and the Middle East	
Professor Kathryn M. Rudy	2022	History of Art and Music	
Professor Valerie Rumbold	2022	Early Modern Languages and Literatures to 1830	
Professor Monika Schmid	2022		
Professor Uta Schönberg	2022		
Professor Marie Louise Stig Sørensen	2022		
Professor Catherine Steel	2022		
Professor Sylvia Walby	2022		
Professor Jane Wills	2022		
Professor Emma Wilson	2022		
Professor Linda Woodhead	2022		
Professor Louise Amoore	2023		
Professor Clare Anderson	2023		
Professor Louise Archer	2023		
Professor Helen Beebee	2023		
Professor Wendy Carlin	2023		
Professor Katherine Clarke	2023		
Professor Neta Crawford	2023		
Professor Georgina Endfield	2023		
Professor Annabelle Gawer	2023		
Professor Rosalind Gill	2023		
Professor Laura Gowing	2023		
Professor Helena Hamerow	2023		
Professor Kate Hunt	2023		
Professor Ananya Jahanara Kabir	2023		
Professor Elizabeth Lambourn	2023		
Professor Susan Marks	2023		
Professor Sharon Monteith	2023		
Professor Debra Myhill	2023		
Professor Lúcia Nagib	2023		
Professor Kate Nation	2023		
Professor Tina K. Ramnarine	2023		
Professor Jennifer Richards	2023		
Professor Susie Scott	2023		
Professor Devyani Sharma	2023		
Professor Lyndsey Stonebridge	2023		
Professor Jane Stuart-Smith	2023		
Professor Nava Ashraf	2024		
Professor Sara Cohen	2024		
Professor Anne Davies	2024		
Professor Esther Eidinow	2024		
Professor Maria Cristina Fumagalli	2024		
Professor Katy Gardner	2024		
Professor Sophie Gilliat-Ray	2024		
Professor Liz James	2024		
Professor Carey Jewitt	2024		
Professor Helen Kennedy	2024		
Professor Rosalind Love	2024		
Professor Asifa Majid	2024		
Professor Miriam Meyerhoff	2024		
Professor Janet Montgomery	2024		
Professor Lydia Morris	2024		
Professor Rachael Mulheron	2024		
Professor Lucy O'Brien	2024		
Professor Philomen Probert	2024		
Professor Jennifer Robinson	2024		
Professor Rebecca Sear	2024		
Professor Alison Shell	2024		
Professor Elisabeth van Houts	2024		
Professor Lea Ypi	2024		
Professor Ayşe Zarakol	2024		
Professor Chrisanthi Avgerou	2025		
Professor Rosalind Ballaster	2025		
Professor Annabel Brett	2025		
Professor Julie Brown	2025		
Professor Erica Carter	2025		
Professor Thalia C. Eley	2025		
Professor Haidy Geismar	2025		
Professor Catherine Grant	2025		
Professor Margaret Hillenbrand	2025		
Professor Jennifer Howard-Grenville	2025		
Professor Caroline Humfress	2025		
Professor Elizabeth Jefferies	2025		
Professor Claire Langhamer	2025		
Professor Tomila Lankina	2025		
Professor Maria Lee	2025		
Professor Gilat Levy	2025		
Professor Marta Mirazón Lahr	2025		
Professor Irini Moustaki	2025		
Professor Yael Navaro	2025		
Professor Joanna Page	2025		
Professor Clare Pettitt	2025		
Professor Diane Reay	2025		
Professor Alison Salvesen	2025		
Professor Sarah Semple	2025		
Professor Jennifer Smith	2025		
Professor Joanna Story	2025		
Professor Jo Applin	2026		
Professor Mia Bay	2026		
Professor Sonia Bhalotra	2026		
Professor Katherine Brickell	2026		
Professor Jill Burke	2026		
Professor Rebecca Cassidy	2026		
Professor Chantal Conneller	2026		
Professor Nandini Das	2026		
Professor Lorraine Dearden	2026		
Professor Nicola Dibben	2026		
Professor Karen Douglas	2026		
Professor Carolin Duttlinger	2026		
Professor Jane Falkingham	2026		
Professor Elizabeth Fisher	2026		
Professor Susan Harrow	2026		
Professor Kirsty Hooper	2026		
Professor Roshini Kempadoo	2026		
Professor Anna Korhonen	2026		
Professor Miriam Leonard	2026		
Professor Morwenna Ludlow	2026		
Professor Celia Lury	2026		
Dr Miranda Morris	2026		
Professor Patricia Owens	2026		
Professor Lucia Prauscello	2026		
Professor Stephanie Rickard	2026		
Professor Pamela Sammons	2026		
Professor Jackie Stacey	2026		
Professor Emma Tarlo	2026		
Professor Karin Wahl-Jorgensen	2026		
Professor Jane Whittle	2026		
