= Banducci =

Banducci is a surname. Notable people with this surname include:

- Bruno Banducci (1921 – 1985), Italo-American football offensive lineman
- Enrico Banducci (1922 – 2007), American impresario
- Michael Banducci, American professional poker player
- Susan Banducci (born 1966), American political scientist and academic
