= Land reform in Pakistan =

Redistribution of agricultural land in Pakistan, 1947–1990

The land reform in Pakistan was a series of laws and policies aimed at restructuring agricultural property relations in Pakistan between independence in 1947 and the judicial reversal of major reform measures in 1989–1990. The land reform was intended to reduce concentration of landed wealth, abolish intermediary rights between the state and cultivators, improve the position of tenants, and redistribute surplus land. Its objectives were justified in terms of social justice, agricultural efficiency, state-building, and, especially after 1971, the eradication of feudalism.

Land reform developed unevenly across the country. In the eastern wing of Pakistan, the East Bengal State Acquisition and Tenancy Act 1950 moved early against the zamindari order and intermediary rent-receivers. In the western wing, the first major ceiling law was the West Pakistan Land Reforms Regulation of 1959, promulgated under Ayub Khan. A second and more radical round followed under Zulfikar Ali Bhutto in 1972, and a third in 1977 further reduced the maximum size of holdings.

In practice, the results were mixed. The eastern wing's reform substantially altered the older zamindari system, but in West Pakistan and, after 1971, in Pakistan proper, loopholes, exemptions, family transfers, weak administration, and political resistance limited redistribution. Ceiling laws were repeatedly tightened, yet large landowners often preserved influence over both land and tenants.

The decisive break came with Qazalbash Waqf v Chief Land Commissioner (PLD 1990 SC 99), in which the Supreme Court of Pakistan's Shariat Appellate Bench set aside the 1972 and 1977 land reform measures as repugnant to Islam. The judgment effectively ended Pakistan's principal programme of ceiling-based land reform.

== Background ==
At independence in 1947, Pakistan inherited regionally varied agrarian systems. In the western wing, large estates, jagirs, absentee landlordism, insecure tenancy, and exploitative practices in rent and labour remained important features of rural society. In the east, agrarian relations were still shaped by the legacy of the Permanent Settlement and the existence of intermediary rent-receivers between the cultivator and the state.

Because of these differences, early Pakistani debate about agrarian change did not centre on a single model. In some provinces, especially Sindh, the immediate focus was on regulating sharecropping and tenancy rather than on large-scale redistribution. Sarah Ansari has shown that in late 1940s and early 1950s Sindh, reformers and officials often treated "development" and the modernisation of agrarian relations as more urgent than egalitarian land reallocation.

Sindh illustrated the problem sharply. In 1947, more than 80 per cent of cultivated land in the province was in the hands of big landlords. The Sindh Hari Enquiry Committee of 1947–48 recommended against abolishing the zamindari system, though it called for greater security of tenure and a fairer share for cultivators. Its work helped shape the Sind Tenancy Act of 1950, which regulated tenancy but did not break up landlord power.

== Aims of the reform ==
=== Social justice and development ===
Pakistan's land reform programmes were justified through a combination of social and economic arguments. Reformers presented concentrated landownership as a barrier to democracy and welfare, while economists and officials argued that insecure tenants lacked the incentive to invest in higher productivity.

In reformist rhetoric, especially in Sindh, agrarian justice could be condensed into the slogan that "he who tills has the right to eat". Yet governments generally balanced redistributive language against concerns about compensation, administrative feasibility, and agricultural output.

The official rationale became most explicit under Bhutto. The 1972 programme was presented as a way to break up concentrations of landed wealth, reduce disparities in rural income, increase production, and recast the landlord–tenant relationship on a more secure footing. The preamble to the 1972 regulation also explicitly linked equitable distribution of wealth to Islamic principles.

=== Regional differentiation ===
The history of land reform in Pakistan was shaped by the state's two-wing structure before 1971. The eastern wing moved first and more decisively against intermediary interests. In the west, reform concentrated more on ceilings, compensation, and the controlled transfer of surplus land. As a result, "land reform in Pakistan" did not denote a single process so much as a sequence of distinct regional and political settlements.

== Implementation ==
=== East Bengal and East Pakistan ===
The earliest major agrarian reform law in Pakistan was the State Acquisition and Tenancy Act, 1950, enacted as East Bengal Act XXVIII of 1951. It grew out of late-colonial proposals for bringing actual cultivators into a more direct relationship with the state.

Under the scheme of the Act, the government acquired rent-receiving interests in phases and became the sole landlord. Holders of land became direct tenants under the state, thereby removing the older chain of intermediary interests characteristic of the zamindari order.

The Act nevertheless allowed former rent-receivers to retain some land. Section 20 provided that the aggregate area retained in the province could not exceed 375 standard bighas, or ten standard bighas for each member of the family, whichever was greater, with certain exceptions for large-scale mechanised, co-operative, and dairy farming, as well as for some religious and charitable endowments. In the eastern wing, therefore, land reform was closely tied to the abolition of intermediary rights rather than only to ceilings on private ownership.

=== West Pakistan under Ayub Khan ===
The first major ceiling law in West Pakistan was the West Pakistan Land Reforms Regulation, 1959, promulgated under Ayub Khan's martial-law regime. It extended to the whole of West Pakistan, including the Federal Capital, but excluded the Special Areas.

The 1959 regulation fixed a ceiling of 500 acres of irrigated land or 1,000 acres of unirrigated land, or an area equivalent to 36,000 produce index units (PIU), whichever was greater. Produce index units were a productivity-based measure used to compare the relative value of different classes of land.

The regulation also contained important exemptions. Owners could retain land up to the productivity ceiling; certain orchards, livestock and stud farms, and some educational, religious, and charitable institutions received special treatment. Excess land vested in the state, compensation was payable in heritable bonds bearing 4 per cent simple interest, and resumed land was first to be offered for sale to tenants in cultivating possession. The regulation also abolished jagirs and Ala-Milkiat-type intermediary interests.

The 1959 reforms were later criticised for their limited redistributive effect. As the ceiling was imposed on individuals rather than families, large landowners could evade surrender through transfers to relatives and dependants. This kept much of the land actually resumed was uncultivated, which reduced the reform's effect on agrarian power relations.

=== Bhutto's 1972 regulation ===
After the secession of East Pakistan and the creation of Bangladesh in 1971, Bhutto's government launched a new round of reform through the Land Reforms Regulation, 1972. The regulation applied to Balochistan, the North-West Frontier Province, Punjab, Sindh, and the Islamabad Capital Territory, but not to the tribal areas. It also repealed the 1959 West Pakistan regulation.

The 1972 regulation reduced the ceiling to 150 acres of irrigated land or 300 acres of unirrigated land, or 15,000 PIU, whichever was greater. Owners who had a tractor in working order or an installed tubewell of at least ten horsepower could retain land up to 18,000 PIU.

Unlike the 1959 regulation, the 1972 measure provided that excess land would vest in government without compensation. Such land was to be granted free of charge, first to tenants in cultivating possession and then to other tenants and persons owning less than a subsistence holding. Bhutto presented the programme as part of a wider campaign against feudal domination.

Even so, the 1972 reforms did not settle the tenancy question. Ceiling legislation without effective rent control left landlords with other means of preserving power, including raising de facto rents through control of tractors and tubewells or obstructing implementation on the ground.

=== Bhutto's 1977 act ===
A further measure, the Land Reforms Act, 1977, lowered ceilings again. It fixed a maximum holding of 100 acres of irrigated land or 200 acres of unirrigated land, or 8,000 PIU, whichever was greater.

Land taken over under the Act was to vest in government and be granted free of charge to tenants in cultivating possession; failing that, it could be allotted to landless tenants and other persons owning less than 12 acres. The Act prohibited alienation of granted land for 20 years and barred subletting by the allottee.

In contrast to the 1972 regulation, however, the 1977 Act provided compensation for surrendered land at the rate of Rs 30 per produce index unit. The Act thus combined a stricter ceiling with a more formalised statutory framework for compensation and allotment.

=== Judicial reversal ===
The Bhutto-era reforms were challenged in the courts. The Federal Shariat Court initially upheld the 1977 Act, but the Shariat Appellate Bench of the Supreme Court in Qazalbash Waqf v Chief Land Commissioner declared the 1972 regulation and the 1977 Act repugnant to the teachings of Islam and set them aside.

The judgment, delivered in 1989 and reported as PLD 1990 SC 99, effectively halted Pakistan's principal programme of ceiling-based land redistribution. Later debate on agrarian inequality continued, but the legal core of the Bhutto-era reforms had been removed.

== Results ==
The results of land reform differed sharply across Pakistan's former eastern and western wings. In East Bengal, the State Acquisition and Tenancy Act transformed agrarian administration by removing intermediary rent-receivers and making cultivators direct tenants under the state.

In West Pakistan and, after 1971, in Pakistan proper, the results were more limited. Successive governments lowered ceilings and resumed some surplus land, but exemptions, productivity-based calculations, family transfers, local manipulation, and administrative weakness curtailed redistribution.

Akmal Hussain argued that agrarian inequality remained substantial even after reform. Using the 1972 Census of Agriculture, he noted that farms below 25 acres accounted for 88 per cent of all farms and 57 per cent of total farm area, while the largest ownership class retained a disproportionate share of land. He further argued that only about 1.9 million acres were actually resumed under the 1959 reforms and about 0.6 million acres under the 1972 reforms.

The political significance of reform was therefore greater than its redistributive achievements. Land reform became a recurring symbol of anti-feudal politics in Pakistan, but it did not eliminate the social and political power of large landowners. For that reason, the history of land reform remained central to later debates about rural inequality, tenancy, and the state's relationship with the countryside.

== Sources ==
- Ahmad, Mushtaq (1959). "Land Reforms in Pakistan". Pakistan Horizon. 12 (1): 30–36. JSTOR 41392253.
- Ansari, Sarah (20 May 2024). ""He who tills has the right to eat": "Development" and the Politics of Agrarian Reform in late 1940s and early 1950s Sindh". Critical Pakistan Studies. 1 (1–2): 50–75. doi:10.1017/cps.2024.9.
- Government of East Bengal (16 May 1951). "The State Acquisition and Tenancy Act, 1950 (East Bengal Act No. XXVIII of 1951)". Bangladesh Laws. Ministry of Law, Justice and Parliamentary Affairs.
- Government of Pakistan (1959). "The West Pakistan Land Reforms Regulation, 1959 (Martial Law Regulation No. 64 of 1959)" (PDF). Punjab Board of Revenue.
- Government of Pakistan (1972). "The Land Reforms Regulation, 1972" (PDF). FAOLEX. Food and Agriculture Organization.
- Government of Pakistan (1977). "The Land Reforms Act, 1977" (PDF). FAOLEX. Food and Agriculture Organization.
- Herring, Ronald J.; Chaudhry, M. Ghaffar (1974). "The 1972 Land Reforms in Pakistan and their Economic Implications: A Preliminary Analysis". The Pakistan Development Review. 13 (3): 245–279.
- Herring, Ronald J. (1979). "Zulfikar Ali Bhutto and the "Eradication of Feudalism" in Pakistan". Comparative Studies in Society and History. 21 (4): 519–557. doi:10.1017/S0010417500013165. JSTOR 178694.
- Hussain, Akmal (1984). "Land reforms in Pakistan: A reconsideration". Bulletin of Concerned Asian Scholars. 16 (1): 46–52. doi:10.1080/14672715.1984.10409782.
- Khalid, Muhammad Usman (2024). "Qazalbash Waqf vs. Chief Land Commissioner". Shaikh Ahmad Hassan School of Law. Lahore University of Management Sciences.
- Naqvi, Syed Nawab Haider; Khan, Mahmood Hasan; Chaudhry, M. Ghaffar, eds. (1987). Land Reforms in Pakistan: A Historical Perspective. Pakistan Institute of Development Economics.
- Quayum, Abdul (17 June 2021). "East Bengal State Acquisition and Tenancy Act 1950". Banglapedia. Asiatic Society of Bangladesh.
