= David Hesmondhalgh =

British sociologist

David Hesmondhalgh is a British sociologist. He is currently Professor of Media, Music and Culture at the University of Leeds. His research focuses on the media and cultural industries, critical approaches to media in the digital age, and the sociology of music.

== Biography ==
Hesmondhalgh is Professor of Media, Music and Culture at the University of Leeds. His interests include the cultural and creative industries, cultural policy, the politics of musical experience, and how 'cultural platforms' are transforming media. He joined the University of Leeds in 2007, having previously worked at The Open University for eight years.

He obtained a PhD from Goldsmiths University of London in 1996 for his dissertation on British independent record companies, where he was supervised by Georgina Born.

His books include The Cultural Industries, first published in 2002, described by Herbert et al. in their Media Industry Studies as "a formative text for many who began their research careers at the start of the century" and as "extensively updated to keep pace with the new issues developing in an era of social and internet-distributed media". Oakley and O'Connor describe the same book as "the most comprehensive overview of the literature and issues in the field" of cultural and creative industries. He is acknowledged as a key figure in developing the "cultural industries" approach to media, which emphasises the complex and contradictory nature of cultural production under capitalism. He is frequently named as one of the leading analysts of cultural labour, partly based on his book Creative Labour, co-written with Sarah Baker. He is also well known for his work on the sociology of music, especially his book Why Music Matters (2013), which provides a "nuanced case for music’s value in contributing to intimate and collective 'human flourishing'".

== Personal life ==
He is the brother of actor and activist Julie Hesmondhalgh and the father of actor and writer Rosa Hesmondhalgh. His long-term partner is the British philosopher Helen Steward.

== Influence ==
His work has established critical approaches to industrial practice adopted by many subsequent studies. These include Mel Brooks in the Cultural Industries: Survival and Prolonged Adaptation (Edinburgh University Press, 2012). This study applied Hesmondhalgh's model of standardized, risk-averse production practices detailed in The Cultural Industries to define a new practice, "prolonged adaptation" - meaning the practice of "repeatedly adapting the same material" in order to "inordinately prolong the commercial life" of ideas. This "prolonged adaptation" practice has since been identified by other scholars in nineteenth century arts, similarly employed "to survive in an unstable and competitive marketplace."

== Books ==
- Western Music and its Others: Difference, Representation and Appropriation in Music, (Berkeley: University of California Press, 2000) ISBN 0-520-22084-6
- Popular Music Studies (London: Arnold, 2002). Eds. D. Hesmondhalgh and K. Negus
- Understanding Media: Inside Celebrity (Maidenhead: Open University Press, 2005). Eds. J. Evans and D. Hesmondhalgh. ISBN 0-335-21880-6
- Media Production (Maidenhead: Open University Press, 2006), ISBN 0-335-21884-9
- The Media and Social Theory (Abingdon and New York: Routledge, 2008). Eds. D Hesmondhalgh, J. Toynbee. ISBN 978-0-415-44800-0.
- Creative Labour: Media Work in Three Cultural Industries (London and New York: Routledge, 2010). D. Hesmondhalgh and S. Baker. ISBN 978-0-415-67773-8
- Why Music Matters (Malden, MA: Wiley-Blackwell, 2013). ISBN 978-1-4051-9241-5
- Culture, Economy and Politics: The Case of New Labour (London: Palgrave Macmillan, 2015) D. Hesmondhalgh, K. Oakley, D. Lee, M. Nisbett. ISBN 978-1-137-42638-3
- Media and Society, 6th edition (New York: Bloomsbury, 2019). Eds. J. Curran and D. Hesmondhalgh. ISBN 978-1-501-34073-4
- The Cultural Industries, 4th edition (London and Los Angeles: Sage, 2019). ISBN 978-1-5264-24105

== Selected publications ==
- Hesmondhalgh, D. (2005) ‘The production of media entertainment’, in Curran, J. and Gurevitch, M. (eds.), Mass Media and Society, 4th edn., London, Hodder Arnold, pp. 153–71.
- Hesmondhalgh, D. (2006) ‘Inside media organizations: production, autonomy and power’, in Hesmondhalgh, D. (ed.) (2006) Media Production, Maidenhead and Milton Keynes: The Open University Press/The Open University, pp. 49–90.
- Hesmondhalgh, D. (2006) ‘Discourse analysis and content analysis’, in Gillespie, M. and Toynbee, J. (eds.), Analysing Media Texts, Maidenhead and Milton Keynes: The Open University Press/The Open University, pp. 119–156.
- Hesmondhalgh, D. (2009) ‘Politics, theory and method in media industries research’, in Holt, J. and Perren, A. (eds.), Media Industries: History, Theory, Method. Malden, MA and Oxford: Blackwell, pp. 245–55.
- Hesmondhalgh, D. (2016) ‘Exploitation and media labor’, in Richard Maxwell (ed), The Routledge Companion to Labor and Media, New York and Abingdon: Routledge, pp. 30–39.
- Hesmondhalgh, D. (2017) ‘The media’s failure to represent the working class: explanations from media production and beyond’, in June Deery and Andrea Press (eds.), The Media and Class (New York: Routledge), pp. 21–37.
- Hesmondhalgh, D. (2017) ‘Why it matters when big tech firms extend their power into media content’, The Conversation, 15 November.
- Hesmondhalgh, D. (2017) ‘British election nights, despair and hope: a personal history’, Social Text Online, 20 June.
- Hesmondhalgh, D. (2019) ‘The British General Election: the nightmare before Christmas’, Social Text Online, 13 December.
