= Sarah Ansari =

British professor of history

Sarah Frances Deborah Ansari is a British professor of history at Royal Holloway, University of London. She is a specialist in the recent history of South Asia, and particularly Pakistan and the partition of India.

== Career ==
Ansari's research interests relate to the recent history of South Asia, and particularly Pakistan. She is the editor of the Journal of the Royal Asiatic Society.

== Writing ==
Ansari's first book was Sufi Saints and State Power: the Pirs of Sind, 1843-1947 (Cambridge, 1992), an elaboration of her University of London PhD thesis, which examined the role of the pirs of Sind, a local Muslim religious elite, in mediating between the British colonial rulers and the people of Sind It was reviewed by Michel Boivin (CNRS, Paris) in the Bulletin Critique Des Annales Islamologiques in 1998, and by Seema Alavi in The Indian Economic & Social History Review in 1993.

In 2002 she edited and contributed to a volume of essays relating to Women, Religion and Culture in Iran (Routledge, London) with Vanessa Martin.

Ansari's Life after Partition (Oxford, 2005), dealt with the effects of the partition of India on the province of Sindh and specifically in Karachi, and was described by Manu Bhagavan in the Journal of Interdisciplinary History as speaking to "matters of pressing contemporary importance, revealing how history is inherently linked to, and informs, the present". Iftikhar Malik in Reviews in History praised the book for providing an "in-depth knowledge of the immense speed and volume of demographic diversification within Sindh", based on Ansari's research in archives in Karachi and at The National Archives in London, supplemented by her examination of American diplomatic correspondence and a study of the English-language Pakistan newspaper Dawn.

In 2014 she was the joint editor of From Subjects to Citizens: Society and the Everyday State in India and Pakistan, 1947–1970, (Cambridge University Press, Delhi) based on a research collaboration between Royal Holloway and the University of Leeds.

== Selected publications ==
- Sufi Saints and State Power: the Pirs of Sind, 1843-1947. Cambridge University Press, Cambridge, 1992. ISBN 0-521-40530-0
- Women, Religion and Culture in Iran. Routledge, 2002. (Editor with Vanessa Martin) ISBN 978-0700715091
- Life after Partition: migration, community and strife in Sindh, 1947-1962. Oxford University Press, Oxford, 2005. ISBN 9780195978346
- From Subjects to Citizens: Society and the Everyday State in India and Pakistan, 1947–1970. Cambridge University Press, Delhi, 2014. (Joint editor with Taylor C. Sherman & William Gould) ISBN 978-1107064270
