= Anthony Bale =

English medievalist

Anthony Bale FBA
- Born: United Kingdom
- Awards: Huntington Library Fellowships, 2003, 2018, 2025. Koret Jewish Studies Publications Prize 2005. Ronald Tress Prize 2007. Frankel Fellowship University of Michigan 2008. Philip Leverhulme Prize 2011. Walter Hines Page Fellowship of the Research Triangle Foundation, National Humanities Center 2012. Beatrice White Prize, English Association 2014. Distinguished International Fellowship, University of Melbourne 2015. Brittingham Fellowship, University of Wisconsin Madison 2015. Morton Bloomfield Fellowship, Harvard University 2019. Leverhulme Major Research Fellowship, 2023-26.

Academic background
- Education: Oxford University; University of York; Hebrew University of Jerusalem
- Academic advisor: Paul Strohm

Academic work
- Institutions: University of Cambridge
- Main interests: Medieval Studies; English Language & Literature
- Website: https://www.english.cam.ac.uk/person/anthony-bale

Anthony Bale FBA is an English medievalist.

== Early life and education ==
Bale was state-educated at a comprehensive school and sixth-form college in north Staffordshire. His father's family were Shetlandic lighthouse-keepers and his mother's family were Jewish refugees from Poland.

== Biography ==
He is the eighth Professor of Medieval and Renaissance English (Cambridge) at the University of Cambridge. He is a fellow of Girton College, Cambridge. He was previously professor of medieval studies and dean of arts at Birkbeck, University of London. He has written widely on medieval Christian-Jewish relations and on medieval culture and literature.

He was awarded a Philip Leverhulme Prize 2011, a prize "awarded to outstanding scholars under the age of 36 who have made a substantial contribution to their field of study, are recognised at an international level, and whose future contributions are held to be of correspondingly high promise." He has published Feeling Persecuted: Christians, Jews and Images of Violence in the Middle Ages, which was awarded the Beatrice White Prize of the English Association. He has published new editions of The Book of Marvels and Travels by Sir John Mandeville and The Book of Margery Kempe. He co-edited (with Sebastian Sobecki) Medieval English Travel: A Critical Anthology, and was Morton W. Bloomfield Fellow at Harvard University. His biography of Margery Kempe, entitled Margery Kempe: A Mixed Life, appeared in 2021. Bale was President of the New Chaucer Society from 2020 to 2022.

In 2023 Viking Penguin published his Travel Guide to the Middle Ages: the World through Medieval Eyes. The Times (UK) praised its 'perfect prose' and The New Yorker called it 'an immensely-entertaining history'. Die Presse (Austria) called it 'a wonderful book'; Blick (Switzerland) called it 'fascinating and outstanding', whilst De Standaard (Belgium) wrote that 'there is no better tour guide than Anthony Bale.'

In April 2024 the University of Cambridge announced that Bale had been elected Professor of Medieval & Renaissance Literature (1954) from October 2024. He was elected a Fellow of the British Academy in 2025.
