= Rong Xinjiang =

Chinese Historian and Professor

- 荣新江
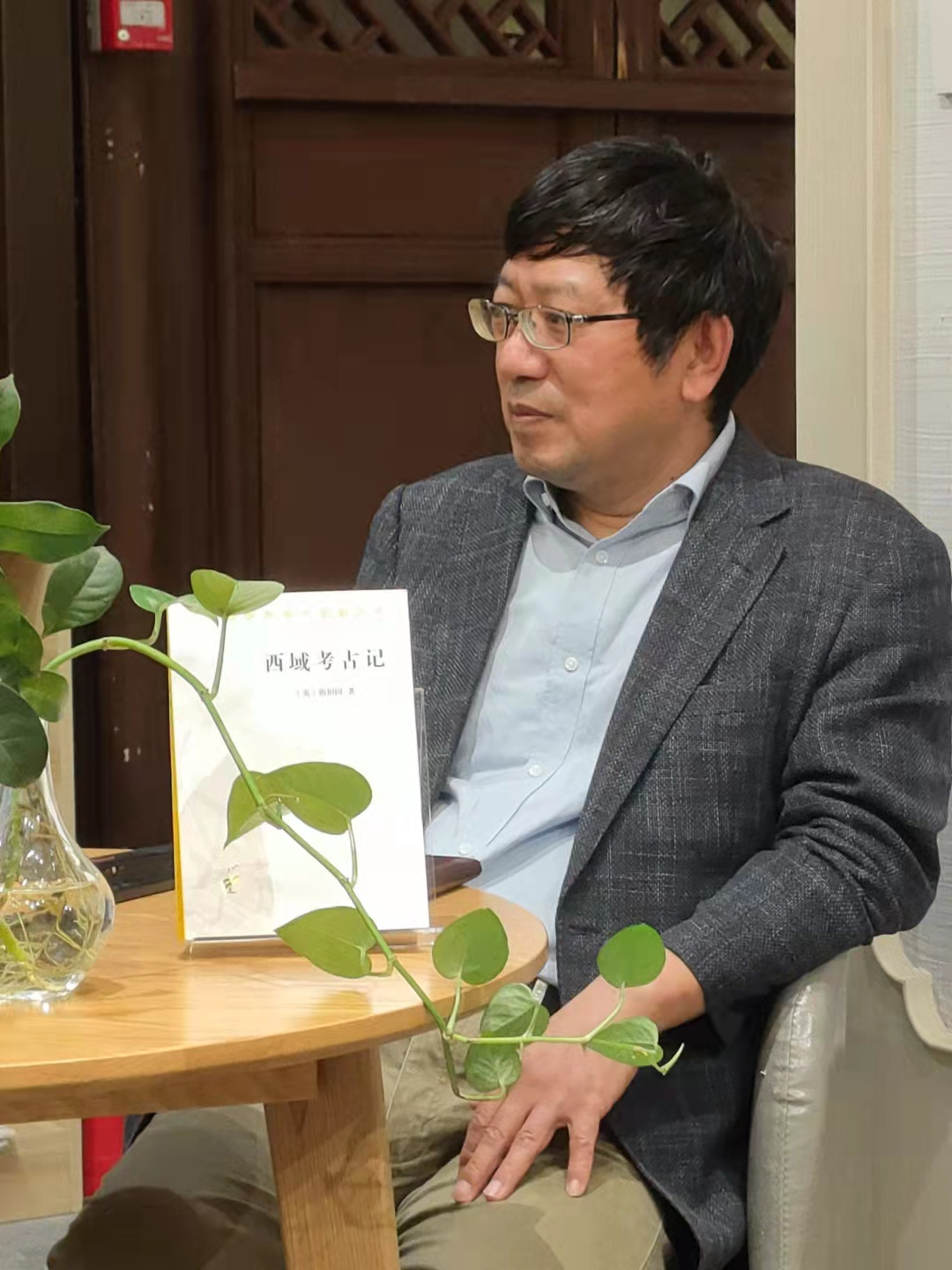
- Born: 1960 (age 65–66); Tianjin, China
- Occupation: Historian

Academic background
- Education: Peking University

Academic work
- Discipline: History
- Sub-discipline: History of Tang
- Institutions: Peking University

Chinese name
- Traditional Chinese: 榮新江
- Simplified Chinese: 荣新江
Transcriptions
Standard Mandarin
- Hanyu Pinyin: Róng Xīnjiāng

Rong Xinjiang (Chinese: 荣新江; born 1960) is a Chinese historian who is a professor at Peking University, currently serving as chairperson of Academic Committee of Department of History and chairperson of Center for Research on Ancient Chinese History. He is also the Cheung Kong Scholars Distinguished Professor of the Ministry of Education, vice chairperson of the Tang Dynasty Institute of China and the Dunhuang and Turpan Institute of China.

== Biography ==
Rong was born in Tianjin in 1960. In 1978, he was admitted to Peking University, where he majored in the Department of History. After graduating in 1985, he stayed at the university and taught there. He was promoted to associate professor in 1988 and to full professor in 1993. From September 1984 to July 1985, he studied at the Sinological Institute, Leiden University in the Netherlands.

He was a visiting scholar at Ryukoku University (September 1990–February 1991), the British Library (February 1991–August 1991), the Institute of Chinese Studies, Chinese University of Hong Kong (November 1992–May 1993), Kyoto University (October 1994–November 1994), Free University Berlin (June 1996–August 1996), the Council on East Asian Studies, Yale University (October 1996–January 1997), and the École Pratique des Hautes Études (1997).

== Publications ==
=== Selected papers ===
- "The Nature of the Dunhuang Library Cave and the Reasons of Its Sealing". Nouvelles Études de Dunhuang. 11. Translated by Valerie, Hansen. Paris/ Kyoto: Cahiers d'Extreme-Asie: 247–275. 1999.
- "More on the Nature of the Tun-huang Treasures: Three Stages Monastery and the Library Cave". Transactions of the International Conference of Eastern Studies. XLV. Tokyo, Japan: The Toho Gakkai: 91–93. 2000.
- "Research on the History of the Western Regions: A Retrospective and Prospects". Social Sciences in China. 2. Translated by Yi, Lin. Beijing: 111–123. 2000.
- "Research on Zoroastrianism in China （1923–2000）". China Archaeology and Art Digest. IV. Translated by Bruce, Doar. Zoroastrianism in China: 7–13. 2000.
- "The Migrations and Settlements of the Sogdians in the Northern Dynasties, Sui and Tang". China Archaeology and Art Digest. IV. Translated by Bruce, Doar. Zoroastrianism in China: 117–163. 2000.
- Louis Bazin; Peter Zieme, eds. (2001). "The Relationship of Dunhuang with the Uighur Kingdom in Turfan in the Tenth Century". De Dunhuang à Istanbul. Hommage à James Russel Hamilton: 275–298.
- Susan Whitfield, ed. (2002). "The Li Shengduo Collection: Original or Forged Manuscripts ?". The British Library Studies in Conservation Science 3. London: The British Library: 62–63.
- "The Illustrative Sequence on An Jia's Screen: A Depiction of the Daily Life of a Sabao". Orientations: 32–35. 2003.
- Chhaya Bhattacharya-Haesner, ed. (2003). "Chinese Inscriptions on the Turfan Textiles in the Museum of Indian Art，Berlin". Appendix II to Central Asian Temple Banners in the Turfan Collection of the Museum für Indische Kunst. Berlin: Dietrich Reimer Verlag: 475.
- V. H. Mair, ed. (2004). "Land Route or Sea Route: Commentary on the study of the paths of transmission and areas in which Buddhism was disseminated during the Han period". Sino-Platonic Papers. 144. Translated by Xiuqin, Zhou: 1–32.
- D. Durkin-Meisterernst, ed. (2004). "Juqu Anzhou's Inscription and the Daliang Kingdom in Turfan". Turfan Revisited – the First Century of Research into the Art and Cultures of the Silk Road. Translated by Yuanyuan, Wang. Berlin: Dietrich Reimer Verlag: 268–275.
- Susan, Whitfield, ed. (2004). "Official Life at Dunhuang in the Tenth Century: The Case of Cao Yuanzhong". The Silk Road: Trade, Travel, War and Faith. Translated by A. Morrison. London: The British Library: 57–62.
- "Sabaoor Sabo: Sogdian Caravan Leaders in the Wall-Paintings in Buddhist Caves". Les Sogdiens en Chine. Paris: école fran?aise d'Extrême-Orient: 207–230. 2005.
- "Khotanese Felt and Sogdian Silver: Foreign Gifts to Buddhist Monasteries in Ninth and Tenth-Century Dunhuang". Asia Major. 1: 15–34. 2005.
- "Sogdians around the Ancient Tarim Basin". Venezia: Libreria Editrice Cafoscarina. 2006: 513–524.
- "New Light on Sogdian Colonies along the Silk Road . Recent Archaeological Finds in Northern China". Berlin-Brandenburg ischeA kadem ie der Wissenschaften. Berichte und Abhandlungen. 10. Berlin: Akademie Verlag: 147–160. 2006.
- "The Sogdian Caravan as Depicted in the Relieves of the Stone Sarcophagus from Shi's Tomb of the Northern Zhou". Chinese Archaeology. 6. Beijing: China Social Sciences Press: 181–185. 2006.
- I. F. Popova, ed. (2008). "Russian Expeditions and the Chinese Authorities in the Late 19th and Early 20th Centuries". Russian Expeditions to Central Asia at the Turn of the 20th Century. St. Petersburg: Slavia: 219–226.
- Werner, Sundermann; Almut, Hintze; Francois de Blois, eds. (2009). "Further Remarks on Sogdians in the Western Regions". Exegisti Monumenta.Festschrift in Honour of Nicholas Sims-Williams. 17. Wiesbaden: Harrassowitz Verlag: 399–416.
- Yiliang, Ye, ed. (2009). "SabaoandSabo: On the Problem of the Leader of Sogdian Colonies during the Northern Dynasties，Sui and Tang Period". Collection of Papers OnIranian Studies in China. Beijing: Peking University Press: 148–162.
- Xinjiang, Rong; Xin, Wen (2009). J. Lerner; L. Russel-Smith (eds.). "Newly Discovered Chinese-Khotanese Bilingual Tallies". Journal of Inner Asian Art and Archaeology. 3: 99–118.
- Xinjiang, Rong; Guangda, Zhang (2009). J. Lerner; L. Russel Smith (eds.). "On the Dating of Khotanese Documents from Khotan Area". Journal of Inner Asian Art and Archaeology. 3: 149–156.
- "The Name of So-called "Tumshuqese"". Bulletin of the Asia Institute. 19: 121–129. 2009.
- Taishan, Yu, ed. (2010). "Further Remarks on the Migrations and Settlements of the Sogdians in the Northern Dynasties, Sui and Tang". Eurasia Studies. 1: 120–140.

=== Academic books ===
- 唐研究 [Studies on Tang Dynasty] (in Chinese). Beijing: Peking University Press. 2005. ISBN 9787301100974.
- 中古中国与外来文明 [Medieval China and Foreign Civilization] (in Chinese). Beijing: Joint Publishing. 2014. ISBN 9787108035530.
- 中古中国与粟特文明 [Medieval China and Sogdian Culture] (in Chinese). Beijing: Joint Publishing. 2014. ISBN 9787108050502.
- 丝绸之路与东西文化交流 [The Silk Road and Cultural Exchanges between the East and the West] (in Chinese). Beijing: Peking University Press. 2015. ISBN 9787301260845.
- 归义军史研究--唐宋时代敦煌历史考索 [A Study on the History of Gui Yi Jun: A Textual Research on the History of Dunhuang in the Tang and Song Dynasties] (in Chinese). Shanghai: Shanghai Classics Publishing House. 2015. ISBN 9787532569946.
- 学理与学谊——荣新江序跋集 [Learning Theory and Learning Friendship: Preface and Postscript of Rong Xinjiang] (in Chinese). Beijing: Zhong Hua Book Company. 2018. ISBN 9787101132496.
- Xinjiang, Rong; Baohai, Dang (2019). 马可·波罗与10–14世纪的丝绸之路 [Marco Polo and the Silk Road (10th–14th Century)] (in Chinese). Beijing: Peking University Press. ISBN 9787301303283.
- 学术训练与学术规范——中国古代史研究入门 [Introduction to the Study of Chinese Ancient History] (in Chinese). Beijing: Peking University Press. 2020. ISBN 9787301186657.
- 从学与追念——荣新江师友杂记 [Learning and Remembrance: Notes on Teachers and Friends of Rong Xinjiang] (in Chinese). Beijing: Zhong Hua Book Company. 2020. ISBN 9787101147018.
- 三升斋随笔 [Essays of Sanshengzhai] (in Chinese). Beijing: Phoenix Publishing House. 2020. ISBN 9787550631885.
- 敦煌学十八讲 [Eighteen Lectures on Dunhuang Studies] (in Chinese). Beijing: Peking University Press. 2020. ISBN 9787301047712.
- Li, Zhao; Xinjiang, Rong, eds. (2021). 龟兹石窟题记 [Cave Inscriptions in Ancient Kuci] (in Chinese). Beijing: Zhongxi Publishing House. ISBN 9787547516638.
- Xinjiang, Rong; Rui, Shi, eds. (2021). 吐鲁番出土文献散录 [Scattered Records of Unearthed Documents in Turpan] (in Chinese). Beijing: Zhong Hua Book Company. ISBN 9787101151084.
- Xinjiang, Rong; Feng, Luo (2021). 粟特人在中国：考古发现与出土文献的新印证 [Sogdians in China: Archaeological Discoveries and New Evidence of Unearthed Documents] (in Chinese). Beijing: Science Press. ISBN 9787030486295.
- Xinjiang, Rong; Deyong, Xin; Xianshi, Meng; Sheng, Han; Chengyong Ge (2021). 唐：中国历史的黄金时代 [Tang: Golden Age of Chinese History] (in Chinese). Beijing: Joint Publishing. ISBN 9787108069733.
- Xinjiang, Rong, ed. (2022). 丝绸之路上的中华文明 [Chinese Civilization on the Silk Road] (in Chinese). Beijing: Commercial Press. ISBN 9787100208260.

== Honours and awards ==
- 22 July 2021 Corresponding Fellow of the British Academy
