= Daniel Wakelin =

English palaeographist (born 1977)

Daniel Leslie Wakelin
- Born: January 31, 1977 (age 49)
- Citizenship: United Kingdom
- Education: University of Cambridge
- Scientific career
- Workplaces: St Hilda's College, Oxford

Daniel Leslie Wakelin, (/ˈweɪklɪn/, born 31 January 1977), is a British palaeographer. He is the Jeremy Griffiths Professor of Medieval English Palaeography in the University of Oxford and a fellow of St Hilda's College.

Wakelin graduated from the Trinity Hall, Cambridge with a PhD in mediaeval palaeography. Previously he worked at the St Catharine's College, Cambridge and the Christ's College, Cambridge. He is a specialist in Mediaeval English literature and its circulation and reception in manuscripts and other material texts, and teaching course in English language and literature 650–1550 in the University of Oxford. He also is a 2015 winner of the DeLong Book History Prize.

== Selected publications ==
- Wakelin, Daniel (2007). Humanism, Reading, & English Literature 1430-1530. Oxford: Oxford University Press. pp. 1–254. doi:10.1093/acprof:oso/9780199215881.001.0001. ISBN 978-0-199-21588-1.
- Wakelin, Daniel; Gillespie, Alexandra, eds. (2011). The Production of Books in England 1350–1500. Cambridge Studies in Palaeography and Codicology. Vol. 14. Cambridge: Cambridge University Press. pp. 1–375. doi:10.1017/CBO9780511976193. ISBN 978-0-521-88979-7.
- Wakelin, Daniel (2012). "Early humanism in England, c.1440-1490". In Copeland, Rita (ed.). The Oxford History of Classical Reception in English Literature. Vol. 1. Oxford: Oxford University Press. pp. 487–513. ISBN 978-0-199-58723-0.
- Wakelin, Daniel (2014). Scribal Correction and Literary Craft. Cambridge Studies in Medieval Literature. Vol. 91. Cambridge: Cambridge University Press. pp. 1–345. doi:10.1017/CBO9781139923279. ISBN 978-1-107-07622-8.
- Wakelin, Daniel (2016). ""Thys ys my boke": Imagining the Owner in the Book". In Flannery, Mary C.; Griffin, Carrie (eds.). Spaces for Reading in Later Medieval England. The New Middle Ages. New York: Palgrave Macmillan, a part of Springer Nature. pp. 13–33. doi:10.1057/9781137428622. ISBN 978-1-137-42861-5.
- Wakelin, Daniel (2022). Immaterial Texts in Late Medieval England: Making English Literary Manuscripts, 1400–1500. Cambridge: Cambridge University Press. pp. 1–300. doi:10.1017/9781009119313. ISBN 978-1-009-10058-8.
