= Barbara Bombi =

Italian historian (born 1971)

Barbara Bombi FBA FRHistS
- Born: 1971 (age 54–55)
- Occupations: Historian and academic
- Title: Professor of Medieval History

Academic background
- Education: Università Cattolica del Sacro Cuore

Barbara Bombi FBA FRHistS (born 1971) is an Italian historian and academic, specialising in medieval and ecclesiastical history. Since 2018, she has been Professor of Medieval History at the University of Kent. She was previously a researcher at the German Historical Institute in Rome, the University of Padua, and Corpus Christi College, Oxford.

Bombi studied medieval history at the Università Cattolica del Sacro Cuore in Milan, Italy, graduating with a Doctor of Philosophy (PhD) degree in 2000. Her research is focused on the High Middle Ages (1200-1450 AD), and includes the papacy, canon law, the Crusades, and the history of the Christian Military Orders.

In 2022, Bombi was elected a Fellow of the British Academy (FBA), the United Kingdom's national academy for the humanities and social sciences.

== Selected works ==
- O'Brien, Bruce; Bombi, Barbara, eds. (2015). Textus Roffensis: Law, Language, and Libraries in Early Medieval England. Studies in the Early Middle Ages. Vol. 30. Turnhout: Brepols N.V. ISBN 978-2503542331.
- Bombi, Barbara (2019). Anglo-Papal Relations in the Early Fourteenth Century: A Study in Medieval Diplomacy. Oxford Studies in Medieval European History. Oxford University Press. ISBN 978-0198729150.
