= Maria Lee (legal scholar) =

British legal scholar

Maria Lee FBA
- Occupation: Legal scholar
- Awards: Fellow of the British Academy (2025)

Academic background
- Education: University of Nottingham (BA); College of Europe (ML)

Academic work
- Sub-discipline: Environmental law; tort law
- Institutions: King's College London; University of Lancashire; University College London

Maria Lee FBA is a British legal scholar who specializes in environmental law. She has several books on environmental policy of the European Union and is a 2025 Fellow of the British Academy.

== Biography ==
Lee obtained a Bachelor of Arts from the University of Nottingham in 1992 and a Master of Laws from the College of Europe in 1993, as well as a postgraduate certificate from the College of Law in 1994.

Lee worked as a lecturer at King's College London and the University of Lancashire, even becoming a senior lecturer in at least one case. In 2007, she became a law professor at University College London. She also served as a director for the UCL Centre for Law and the Environment, with her tenure lasting over a decade. She was a member of the London Sustainable Development Commission from 2007 to 2009 and of the Royal Commission on Environmental Pollution from 2009 to 2011.

As an academic, Lee specializes in environmental law (particularly the risk governance of emerging technologies) and tort law (particularly how both fields intersect). She has several books on environmental law, including EU Environmental Law: Challenges, Change and Decision-Making (2005) and Environmental Group and Legal Expertise: Shaping the Brexit Process (2021 with Carolyn Abbot). She serves as co-editor of UCL Faculty of Laws' Current Legal Problems lecture series. She wrote a few articles for The Conversation. She has held several positions in The Society of Legal Scholars, including executive committee member (until 2021), chair of the Law School and the Climate Crisis and Research Grants Committee (until 2023), and honorary secretary (2026–present).

In 2018, Lee was elected Senior Fellow of the Higher Education Academy. In 2025, she was elected Fellow of the British Academy.

== Works ==
- EU Environmental Law: Challenges, Change and Decision-Making (2005)
- (with Jane Holder) Environmental Protection, Law and Policy (2007)
- EU Regulation of GMOs: Law and Decision Making for a New Technology (2008)
- EU Environmental Law, Governance and Decision-Making (2014)
- (with Carolyn Abbot) Environmental Group and Legal Expertise: Shaping the Brexit Process (2021)
- (ed. with Carolyn Abbot) Taking English Planning Law Scholarship Seriously (2022)
