= Joanna Page (academic) =

British academic and professor of Latin American Studies

- Occupation: Academic
- Employer: University of Cambridge
- Known for: Latin American studies, science and culture, CRASSH
- Title: Professor of Latin American Studies
- Website: mmll.cam.ac.uk/jep29

Joanna Page FBA is a British academic specialising in Latin American studies. She is Professor of Latin American Studies at the University of Cambridge, Director of the Centre for Research in the Arts, Social Sciences and Humanities (CRASSH), Fellow of Robinson College, Cambridge, and a Fellow of the British Academy.

== Education and career ==
Page is a Professor in the Faculty of Modern and Medieval Languages and Linguistics at the University of Cambridge, where she teaches Latin American literature and visual culture. She served as Director of the Centre of Latin American Studies from 2014 to 2018.

In October 2022, she became Director of CRASSH, a major interdisciplinary research centre at Cambridge. She has been a Fellow of Robinson College since 2002.

In 2025, she was elected a Fellow of the British Academy, the United Kingdom’s national academy for the humanities and social sciences.

== Research ==
Page’s research focuses on the relationship between science and culture in Latin America, including literature, cinema, comics, and visual art. Her work also addresses topics such as memory, posthumanism, decolonial theory, environmental justice, and political ecology, particularly in the contexts of Argentina, Brazil, and Chile.

She has led several research projects funded by the British Academy and the Arts and Humanities Research Council (AHRC), including “Science in Text and Culture in Latin America” (2014–2016) and “Art, Science, and Environmental Justice in Latin America” (2018–2020).

== Honours ==
- Fellow of the British Academy (2025)
- British Academy Mid-Career Fellow (2012)

== Selected works ==
=== Monographs ===
- Crisis and Capitalism in Contemporary Argentine Cinema (Duke University Press, 2009)
- Creativity and Science in Contemporary Argentine Literature: Between Romanticism and Formalism (University of Calgary Press, 2014) open access version
- Science Fiction in Argentina: Technologies of the Text in a Material Multiverse (University of Michigan Press, 2016) open access version
- Posthumanism and the Graphic Novel in Latin America (co-authored with Ed King, UCL Press, 2017) open access version
- Decolonizing Science in Latin American Art (UCL Press, 2021) open access version
- Decolonial Ecologies: The Reinvention of Natural History in Latin American Art (Open Book Publishers, 2023) open access version

=== Edited volumes ===
- Visual Synergies in Fiction and Documentary Film from Latin America (with Miriam Haddu, Palgrave, 2009)
- Geopolitics, Culture, and the Scientific Imaginary in Latin America (with María del Pilar Blanco, University Press of Florida, 2020)
