= Theresa Buckland =

Emeritus Professor

Theresa Jill Buckland FBA (b. 1954) is emeritus Professor of Dance History and Ethnography at the University of Roehampton.

== Biography ==
Buckland studied for her BA in English Language and Literature at the University of Leeds, where she also completed her PhD at the Institute of Dialect and Folk Life Studies. Before joining Roehampton in 2013 she was Head of Dance at the University of Surrey and Professor of Performing Arts at De Montfort University.

Buckland is on the editorial board of the journal Folklore and is assistant editor of the journal Dance Research. She was elected as a Fellow of the British Academy on 22 June 2022.

== Select publications ==
- Bakka, E., Buckland T.J., Saarikoski, H., and von Bibra Wharton, A. 2020. Waltzing Through Europe: Attitudes Towards Couple Dances in the Long Nineteenth Century.
- Buckland, T.J. 2011. Society Dancing. Fashionable Bodies in England, 1870-1920. Palgrave Macmillan.
- Buckland, T. 2006. Dancing from past to present : nation, culture, identities. University of Wisconsin Press.
