= Joanne Conaghan =

British legal scholar

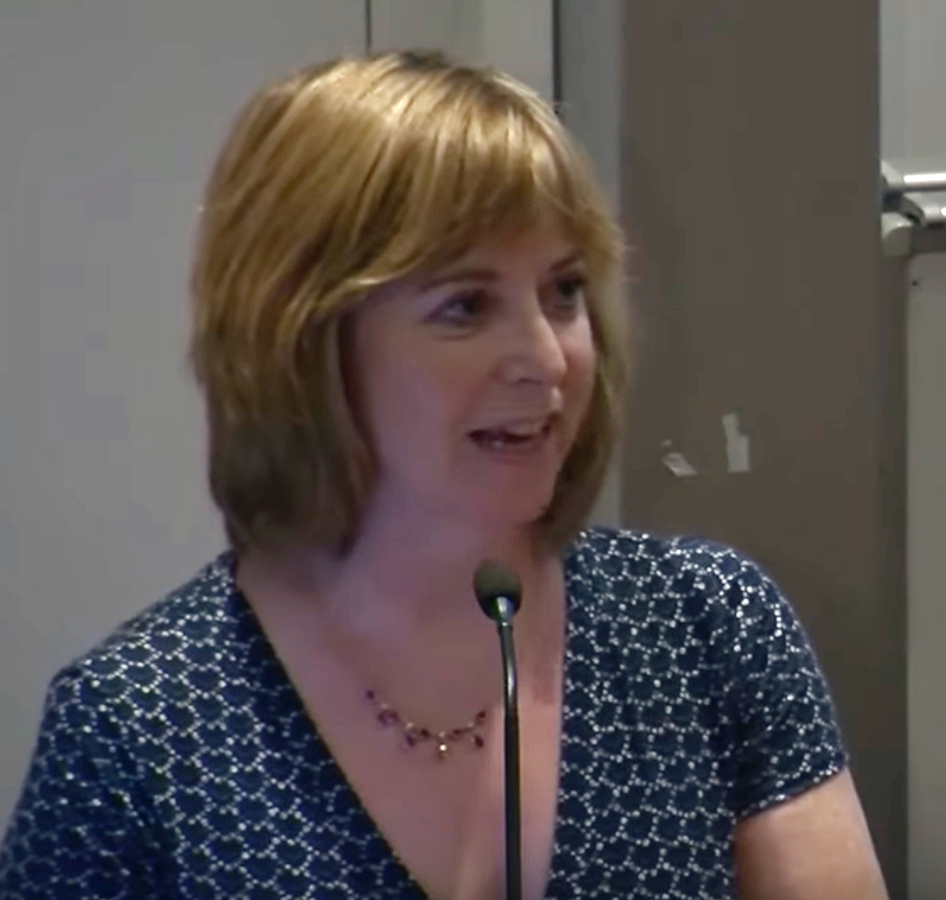
Joanne Conaghan in 2014

Joanne A. F. Conaghan, FBA, FAcSS is an Irish legal scholar based in the UK, specialising in the intersection between gender and the law and in feminist legal studies.

== Life ==
Since 2013, she has been Professor of Law at the University of Bristol. She previously taught at the University of Kent, the University of Exeter and the University of California, San Diego. She was head of the University of Kent Law School from 2008 to 2011 and head of the University of Bristol Law School from 2014 to 2018.

In 2021, Conaghan was elected a Fellow of the British Academy (FBA), the United Kingdom's national academy for the humanities and social sciences. She is chair of the Law Sub-Panel for REF 2021, the United Kingdom's research excellence assessment exercise.

== Selected works ==
- Conaghan, Joanne; Mansell, Wade (1999). The wrongs of tort (2nd ed.). London: Pluto Press. ISBN 978-0745312934.
- Cane, Peter; Conaghan, Joanne, eds. (2008). The new Oxford companion to law. Oxford: Oxford University Press. ISBN 978-0199290543.
- Conaghan, Joanne, ed. (2009). Feminist legal studies. London: Routledge. ISBN 978-0415447485.
- Conaghan, Joanne (2013). Law and gender. Oxford: Oxford University Press. ISBN 978-0199592920.
