= Gilat Levy =

British-Israeli economist

Gilat Levy (Hebrew: גילת לוי) is a British-Israeli economist, and is a full time Professor at the London School of Economics.

== Education ==
She studied economics at the Tel Aviv University where she attained her BA in economics in 1992. Levy earned her Doctor of Philosophy (PhD) degree in economics at Princeton University in 1999.

== Career ==
Levy has been a professor of economics at the London School of Economics since 1999, specializing in microeconomic theory, political economy and law & economics. Levy is a full-time professor teaching graduate courses focusing on microtheory and political economy. Levy previously held the role of deputy-head for teaching at the economics department at the London School of Economics from 2013 to 2016. She is also a council member for the European Economic Association. Levy is currently a research fellow with the Centre for Economic Policy Research and is a member of the Board of Managing Editors for the Royal Economic Society's The Economic Journal.

== Select bibliography ==
- "It takes two : an explanation of the democratic peace," LSE Research Online Documents on Economics 539, London School of Economics and Political Science, LSE Library. 2004, with Ronny Razin.
- “Careerist Judges and the Appeals Process.” The RAND Journal of Economics, vol. 36, no. 2, 2005, pp. 275–297.
- Levy, G. (1 November 2005). "The Politics of Public Provision of Education". The Quarterly Journal of Economics. 120 (4): 1507–1534. doi:10.1162/003355305775097489. ISSN 0033-5533.
- “Decision Making in Committees: Transparency, Reputation, and Voting Rules.” The American Economic Review, vol. 97, no. 1, 2007, pp. 150–168.

== Blog posts and press citations ==
Levy has been a Joint Managing Editor for the Economic Journal. She has been part of the board of editors for the American Economic Review. She was an Associate Editor for Theoretical Economics. She was also previously a part of the editorial board for the Review of Economic Studies.

== Awards ==
EUI awarded Levy an honorary doctorate in June 2024. ESRC and ERC have awarded Levy with several research awards towards her work. She is a fellow of the European Economic Association and the Econometric Society.
