= Beth Jefferies =

British cognitive neuroscientist

Elizabeth Jefferies, FBA (born 19 May 1978) is a British psychologist and academic, specialising in neuropsychology. Since 2013, she has been Professor of Cognitive Neuroscience at the University of York. Having studied at Lincoln College, Oxford and the University of Bristol, she was a researcher at the University of Manchester before joining York.

In July 2025, Jefferies was elected a Fellow of the British Academy (FBA), the United Kingdom's national academy for the humanities and social sciences.

== Selected works ==
- Jefferies, Elizabeth; Lambon Ralph, Matthew A. (August 2006). "Semantic impairment in stroke aphasia versus semantic dementia: a case-series comparison". Brain. 129 (8): 2132–2147. doi:10.1093/brain/awl153.
- Margulies, Daniel S.; Ghosh, Satrajit S.; Goulas, Alexandros; Falkiewicz, Marcel; Huntenburg, Julia M.; Langs, Georg; Bezgin, Gleb; Eickhoff, Simon B.; Castellanos, F. Xavier; Petrides, Michael; Jefferies, Elizabeth; Smallwood, Jonathan (November 2016). "Situating the default-mode network along a principal gradient of macroscale cortical organization". Proceedings of the National Academy of Sciences. 113 (44): 12574–12579. doi:10.1073/pnas.1608282113. PMC 5098630.
- Lambon Ralph, Matthew A.; Jefferies, Elizabeth; Patterson, Karalyn; Rogers, Timothy T. (January 2017). "The neural and computational bases of semantic cognition". Nature Reviews Neuroscience. 18 (1). Nature Publishing Group: 42–55. doi:10.1038/nrn.2016.150. ISSN 1471-0048.
- Smallwood, Jonathan; Bernhardt, Boris C.; Leech, Robert; Bzdok, Danilo; Jefferies, Elizabeth; Margulies, Daniel S. (August 2021). "The default mode network in cognition: a topographical perspective". Nature Reviews Neuroscience. 22 (8). Nature Publishing Group: 503–513. doi:10.1038/s41583-021-00474-4. ISSN 1471-0048.
