= Jacqueline Coyle-Shapiro =

Jacqueline A.-M. Coyle-Shapiro, FBA is an Irish scholar of organisational behaviour. Since 2019, she has been a professor at California State University, San Bernardino. Having briefly taught at the University of Oxford, she became a lecturer in lecturer at the London School of Economics in 1996. She was promoted to reader in 2003 and appointed Professor of Organisational Behaviour in 2008. She was president of the Academy of Management from 2019 to 2020.

Coyle-Shapiro has a Bachelor of Commerce (BCom) degree and a master's degree in business from University College Dublin. She has a graduate diploma in business studies and a Doctor of Philosophy (PhD) degree from the London School of Economics. Her doctoral thesis was titled "The impact of a TQM intervention on work attitudes: a longitudinal case study" and was completed in 1996.

In 2022, she was elected a Fellow of the British Academy (FBA), the United Kingdom's national academy for the humanities and social sciences.

== Selected works ==
- Coyle-Shapiro, Jackie; Kessler, Ian (2000). "Consequences of the psychological contract for the employment relationship: a large scale survey". The Journal of Management Studies. 37 (7): 904–930.
- Coyle-Shapiro, Jacqueline A-M. (2002). "A psychological contract perspective on organizational citizenship behavior". Journal of Organizational Behavior. 23: 927–946.
- Coyle-Shapiro, Jacqueline A-M.; Conway, Neil (2005). "Exchange relationships: Examining psychological contracts and perceived organizational support". Journal of Applied Psychology. 90 (4): 774–781.
- Coyle-Shapiro, Jacqueline A-M; Shore, Lynn M.; Taylor, M. Susan; Tetrick, Lois E., eds. (2004). The employment relationship: examining psychological and contextual perspectives. Oxford; New York: Oxford University Press. ISBN 978-0199269136.
- Shore, Lynn M.; Coyle-Shapiro, Jacqueline A-M.; Tetrick, Lois E., eds. (2012). The Employee-Organization Relationship: Applications for the 21st Century. New York; London: Routledge. ISBN 9781138110809.
