= Seema Alavi =

Indian historian

Seema Alavi is an Indian historian. She is a professor of history at Ashoka University, India and specializes in medieval and early modern South Asia.

== Career ==
Alavi completed her doctorate in history from the University of Cambridge, and has been the recipient of a Fulbright fellowship, as well as fellowships at the Radcliffe Institute, at Harvard University, and the Centre of South Asian Studies at the University of Cambridge. She was a professor of history at Jamia Millia Islamia University in New Delhi, India, and has also taught at Jawaharlal Nehru University and the University of Delhi. She currently teaches at Ashoka University, India.

She serves on the editorial board of several national and international journals, including Modern Asian Studies, Journal of Colonialism and Colonial History, Journal of the Royal Asiatic Society, and Biblio.

== Writing ==
Alavi published Sepoys and the Company: Tradition and Transition in Northern India, 1770–1830 (Oxford University Press, 1995), which studied the formation of the Bengal Army by the East India Company in India between 1770 and 1830. It was developed from her doctoral dissertation at Cambridge University, which was titled, North Indian military culture in transition. The book was reviewed in The Indian Economic and Social History Review by Michael H. Fisher, and in the Journal of Asian Studies, by Douglas M. Peers.

In 2001, along with historian Muzaffar Alam, she published A European Experience of the Mughal Orient: The I'jaz-i Arsalani (Oxford University Press), which was the first English translation of Persian letters written by Antoine-Louis-Henri Polier, an 18th-century Swiss adventurer and traveler. The letters were acquired by the Bibliotheque Nationale de France, which commissioned the translation from Alam and Alavi. Their translation was reviewed in Reviews in History by P. J. Marshall, in The Indian Historical Review, by Raziuddin Aquil, and in The International History Review by Robert Travers.

In 2002, Alavi edited The Eighteenth Century in India, as part of Oxford University Press' series of Debates in Indian History and Society, consisting of key documents and debates in 18th-century Indian historiography. It contained contributions from Irfan Habib, Bernard S. Cohn, P.J. Marshall, and C.A. Bayly. In 2008, Alavi published Islam and Healing: Loss and Recovery of an Indo-Muslim Medical Tradition, 1600–1900 (Palgrave Macmillan), which studied the history of medicine and care in Islamic traditions in India. The book was reviewed by Farhat Hasan in Contributions to Indian Sociology, by Projit Bihari Mukharji in Social History of Medicine, by Francis Robinson in Journal of the Economic and Social History of the Orient, and Anne Marie Moulin in the International Journal of Asian Studies.

In 2015, Alavi published Muslim Cosmopolitanism in the age of Empire (Harvard University Press), which is a study of five Islamic scholars who were pursued by British colonial authorities after the Indian Rebellion of 1857, and their work in establishing a global network of scholarship subsequently, spanning Cairo, Mecca, and Istanbul. The book received an honorable mention in the 2016 Albert Hourani Book Award, by the Middle East Studies Association.

Alavi has also published research in Modern Asian Studies, The Indian Economic and Social History Review, and the Journal of Colonialism and Colonial History.

== Bibliography ==
- The sepoys and the company: tradition and transition in Northern India 1770–1830. Oxford University Press. 2006. ISBN 0195645952.
- —, ed. (2011). The eighteenth century in India. Oxford University Press. ISBN 9780195692013.
- with Alam, Muzaffar, eds. (2007). A European experience of the Mughal Orient: the Iʻjāz-i arsalānī (Persian letters 1773–1779) of Antoine-Louis Henri Polier. Oxford University Press. ISBN 9780195691870.
- Islam and Healing: Loss and Recovery of an Indo-Muslim Medical Tradition, 1600–1900. Palgrave Macmillan UK. 2008. ISBN 9780230583771.
- Muslim Cosmopolitanism in the age of Empire. Harvard University Press. 2015. ISBN 9780674735330.
