= Lúcia Nagib =

Brazilian-born film scholar and professor of world cinema

Lúcia Nagib FBA
- Occupations: Film scholar, filmmaker
- Awards: Fellow of the British Academy

Academic background
- Education: University of São Paulo (LLB, MA, PhD)

Academic work
- Discipline: Film studies
- Sub-discipline: World cinema, cinematic realism, cinematic intermediality, Brazilian cinema, Japanese cinema, German cinema
- Institutions: University of Reading

Lúcia Nagib FBA is a film scholar and filmmaker specializing in world cinema, cinematic realism, cinematic intermediality, and national cinemas, specifically Brazilian, Japanese, and German cinemas. She is currently a professor of film at the University of Reading. In 2023, she was elected a Fellow of the British Academy.

== Education ==
Nagib earned an LLB in Law from the University of São Paulo (USP) in 1979. She completed an MA in Film Studies at USP in 1989. She received her PhD in Film Studies from USP in 1994.

== Career ==
=== Academic career ===
Nagib began her academic career in Brazil, serving as an Assistant Professor (1996–1999) and Associate Professor (1999–2004) at the University of Campinas (Unicamp). Simultaneously, she was the Director of the Centre for Cinema Studies and an assistant professor at the Catholic University of São Paulo from 1996 to 2001.

In 2005, she moved to the United Kingdom to become the Centenary Professor of World Cinemas at the University of Leeds, a position she held until 2013. During her tenure at Leeds, she also served as the Director of the Centre for World Cinemas.

In April 2013, she was appointed Professor in the Department of Film, Theatre and Television at the University of Reading. From 2014 to 2022, she served as the Director of the Centre for Film Aesthetics and Cultures (CFAC) at Reading. She was appointed an Honorary Professor of Film at the University of Nottingham, Ningbo, China for the period of 2022 to 2025.

=== Editorial and curatorial work ===
Prior to her full-time academic career, Nagib worked as the assistant director of the Cinemateca Brasileira (Brazilian Film Library) from 1988 to 1991. She was a film and culture critic for the daily newspaper Folha de S. Paulo from 1989 to 2005.

She has served as Chief Editor for the journals Estudos de Cinema (1996–2001) and Imagens (1994–1998). Currently, she co-edits the World Cinema Series and the Film Thinks Series for Bloomsbury Publishing.

== Awards and honours ==
- 2024: Homage for lifetime achievements in film research and teaching, SOCINE (Brazilian Society for Cinema and Audiovisual Studies)
- 2024: Best Edited Collection Prize for The Moving Form of Film from AIM (Portuguese Association for the Moving Image)
- 2023: Elected Fellow of the British Academy (FBA)
- 2023: Outstanding Achievement Award (Edited Collection of the Year) for Towards an Intermedial History of Brazilian Cinema from MeCCSA.
- 2022: Runner-up prize for best monograph for Realist Cinema as World Cinema from BAFTSS
- 2020: Best International Documentary Prize for Passages at the Los Angeles Brazilian Film Festival

== Selected publications ==
Nagib is the single author of seven books and the editor of eleven books.

=== Authored books ===
- Werner Herzog: o cinema como realidade (Estação Liberdade, 1991)
- Nascido das cinzas: autor e sujeito nos filmes de Oshima (Edusp, 1995)
- O Cinema da Retomada: depoimentos de 90 cineastas dos anos 90 (Editora 34, 2002)
- A utopia no cinema brasileiro: matrizes, nostalgia, distopias (Cosac Naify, 2006)
- Brazil on Screen: Cinema Novo, New Cinema, Utopia (I.B. Tauris, 2007)
- World Cinema and the Ethics of Realism (Continuum/Bloomsbury, 2011)
- Realist Cinema as World Cinema: Non-cinema, Intermedial Passages, Total Cinema (University of Amsterdam Press, 2020)

=== Edited collections ===
- The New Brazilian Cinema (I.B. Tauris, 2003)
- Realism and the Audiovisual Media (Palgrave, 2009) – with Cecília Mello.
- Theorizing World Cinema (I.B. Tauris, 2012) – with Chris Perriam and Rajinder Dudrah.
- Impure Cinema: Intermedial and Intercultural Approaches to Film (I.B. Tauris, 2014) – with Anne Jerslev.
- Towards an Intermedial History of Brazilian Cinema (Edinburgh University Press, 2022) – with Luciana Corrêa de Araújo and Tiago de Luca.
- The Moving Form of Film: Historicising the Medium Through Other Media (Oxford University Press, 2023) – with Stefan Solomon.
- Reimagining the Humanities: Chinese and Western Perspectives, II & III (The Commercial Press, 2024–2025) – with Wong, S., Yang, H., He, W., and Reynolds, M.

== Filmography ==
- Academy visual history with Carlos Diegues (2017) – Interviewer (The Academy of Motion Picture Arts and Sciences)
- Passages: Travelling in and out of Film Through Brazilian Geography (2019) – Writer and co-director (with Samuel Paiva)
- Films to Die For: Wim Wenders and the Death of Glauber Rocha (2022) – Director (Video essay)
- Films to Die For (2025) – Writer and Director
