= Elaine Unterhalter =

South African educational researcher

- Born: 1952 (age 73–74)
- Occupation: Educational researcher

Academic background
- Education: University of the Witwatersrand

Elaine Unterhalter FBA (born 1952) is a South African educational researcher. She is Professor of Education and International Development at University College London. Unterhalter was elected as Fellow of the British Academy in 2020. She is a Fellow of the Human Development and Capability Association.
