= Isabel Torres (academic) =

Irish Spanish literature scholar

Isabel Marie Bernadette Torres FBA (b.1965) is Professor of Spanish Golden Age Literature at Queen’s University Belfast.

== Biography ==
Torres gained her Bachelor's degree and PhD from Queen's University. She was elected as member of the Royal Irish Academy in 2019, and as a Fellow of the British Academy in 2020.
