= Tomila Lankina =

British scholar

Tomila Lankina is a political scientist whose research focuses on historical political economy, democratization, and subnational governance. Her work examines comparative politics in Russia and Eastern Europe, as well as India, with particular attention to how historical and colonial legacies shape political institutions and social development.

She is a Full Professor of Politics and International Relations at the Department of International Relations at the London School of Economics. In 2025 she was elected as a fellow of the British Academy.

== Biography ==
Tomila Lankina was born in Tashkent, Uzbekistan into a family of indologists. She received her PhD in politics at the University of Oxford at St Antony’s and later Balliol College in 2001, with the dissertation "Local Self-Government and Ethnic Mobilization in the Russian Federation, 1990-1999." Previously, she earned an MA in International Relations, Fletcher School of Law and Diplomacy, Tufts University, United States in 1995, and a BA in Indian Studies in 1993 at the Tashkent Institute of Oriental Studies.

== Research ==
Tomila Lankina’s early works are dedicated to subnational governance and the diffusion of democratic and authoritarian institutions, the colonial legacy for regional development, and protest in electoral autocracies. Her articles on post-communist regions analyse how geographical proximity to the West and European Union aid shape democratic trajectories in Russia’s regions and explain institutional choices in local government, including the survival of elected mayors, through competing democratic and authoritarian diffusion pressures. In studies on colonial India, she examines how Christian missionaries and patterns of religious competition affected female education and left long-term human capital and democratic legacies at the subnational level. In later works on contentious politics in Russia, she develops and employs protest-event datasets to document regional variation in civic activism, explore the political and institutional conditions underpinning protest, and found that during the 2011–12 electoral protests in Russia national media coverage and regime-led repression mitigated public support for protest movements and their demands.

=== The Estate Origins of Democracy in Russia ===
Her recent works and the latest book The Estate Origins of Democracy in Russia: From Imperial Bourgeoisie to Post-Communist Middle Class (2021) explore the topic of historical legacies and persistence in political development. The book examines how the Tsarist estate (soslovie) system—dividing society into nobility, clergy, merchants, meshchane, and peasants—created social hierarchies that endured through the Soviet era and continue to shape Russia’s contemporary middle class and political landscape. Challenging the view of communism as an equalising project, it traces how pre-revolutionary elites adapted and survived, contributing to the formation of a two-tiered middle class and to long-lasting social cleavages that influence democratic attitudes and patterns of political mobilisation.

In 2023 the book was awarded "Honorable Mention" for the Sartori Book Award of the American Political Science Association, Davis Center Book Prize, and J. David Greenstone Prize for the best book in the Politics and History section of the American Political Science Association.

In 2025, Tomila Lankina was awarded an Einstein Visiting Fellowship for the project “The Hidden Resilience of the Liberal Tradition in the Long-Term Perspective: Russian and Ukrainian Experience" to establish a research group at Freie Universität Berlin jointly with Alexander Libman. The project investigates whether historically embedded communities preserved liberal value orientations despite periods of repression, and to what extent these legacies shaped patterns of civic engagement and protest behaviour over the long term.

== Selected publications ==
=== Books ===
- Lankina, T. V. (2021). The Estate Origins of Democracy in Russia: From Imperial Bourgeoisie to Post-Communist Middle Class. Cambridge: Cambridge University Press.
- Lankina, T. V., Hudalla, A., & Wollmann, H. (2008). Local governance in Central and Eastern Europe: Comparing performance in the Czech Republic, Hungary, Poland and Russia. Springer.
- Lankina, T. V. (2006), Governing the locals: local self-government and ethnic mobilization in Russia. Bloomsbury Publishing PLC.

=== Articles ===
- Lankina, Tomila V., Alexander Libman, and Katerina Tertytchnaya. "State violence and target group adaptation: Maintaining social status in the face of repressions in Soviet Russia." Journal of Peace Research 62, no. 2 (2025): 195-210.
- Lankina, T. V., & Libman, A. (2021). The two-pronged middle class: The old bourgeoisie, new state-engineered middle class, and democratic development. American Political Science Review, 115(3), 948-966.
- “Protest in Electoral Autocracies: A New Dataset” (with Katerina Tertytchnaya) Post-Soviet Affairs 36 (1) (2020): 20-36.
- “Electoral Protests and Political Attitudes under Electoral Authoritarianism” Tertytchnaya, Katerina and Tomila V. Lankina, The Journal of Politics 82 (1) (2019): 285-299.
- Soviet Legacies of Economic Development, Oligarchic Rule and Electoral Quality in Eastern Europe’s Partial Democracies: The Case of Ukraine” (with Alexander Libman) Comparative Politics 52 (1) (2019): 127-176.
- ‘Russian Spring’ or ‘Spring Betrayal’? The Media as a Mirror of Putin’s Evolving Strategy in Ukraine” (with Kohei Watanabe) Europe-Asia Studies 69 (10) (2018): 1526-56.
- “Fabricating Votes for Putin: New Tests of Fraud and Electoral Manipulations from Russia”, Skovoroda, Rodion and Tomila V. Lankina, Post-Soviet Affairs 33 (2) (2016): 1-24.
- “Appropriation and Subversion: Pre-communist Literacy, Communist Party Saturation, and Post-Communist Democratic Outcomes” (with Alexander Libman and Anastassia Obydenkova) World Politics 68 (2) (2016): 229-274.
- “Authoritarian and Democratic Diffusion in Post-Communist Regions” (with Alexander Libman and Anastassia Obydenkova) Comparative Political Studies 49 (12) (2016): 1599-1629.
- “Boris Nemtsov and the Reproduction of the Regional Intelligentsia” Demokratizatsiya 24 (1) (2016): 45-68.
- The Dynamics of Regional and National Contentious Politics in Russia: Evidence from a New Dataset.” Problems of Post-Communism 62 (1) (2015): 26-44.
- “New Data on Protest Trends in Russia’s Regions” (with Alisa Voznaya), Europe-Asia Studies 67 (2) (2015): 327-342.
- “Competitive Religious Entrepreneurs: Christian Missionaries and Female Education in Colonial and Post-colonial India” (with Lullit Getachew) British Journal of Political Science 43 (1) (2013): 103-31.
- “Mission or Empire, Word or Sword? The Human Capital Legacy in Post-colonial Democratic Development” (with Lullit Getachew) American Journal of Political Science 56 (2) (2012), 465-83.
- “Authoritarian versus Democratic Diffusions: Explaining Institutional Choices in Russia’s Local Government” (with Vladimir Gel’man), Post-Soviet Affairs 24 (1) (2008): 40-62.
- “A Geographic Incremental Theory of Democratization: Territory, Aid, and Democracy in Post-Communist Regions” (with Lullit Getachew) World Politics 58 (4) (July 2006): 536-82.
