= Robin Mansell =

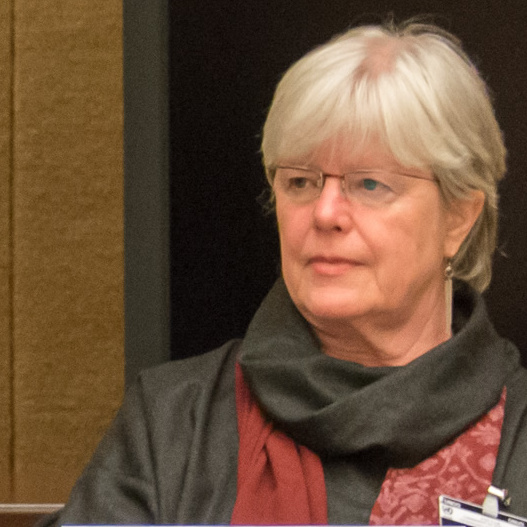
- in 2015
- Born: 3 January 1952 (age 73)
- Education: University of Manitoba, LSE and Simon Fraser University
- Employer: LSE
- Known for: Professor of Media and author

Robin Elizabeth Mansell, FBA, FAcSS (born 3 January 1952) is a Canadian-British scholar, who is Professor Emeritus in the Department of Media and Communications at the London School of Economics and Political Science. Previously she was the Head of the Department of Media and Communications at the LSE. She is an expert on the internet and copyright and has published books on the subject.

Currently, She is the Scientific Director, Observatory on Information and Democracy, Forum on Information & Democracy, Paris.

== Life ==
Mansell was born on 3 January 1952 in Vancouver, Canada. She gained her first degree in psychology at the University of Manitoba in 1974. She obtained her first masters at the LSE before taking a second and earning her doctorate at Simon Fraser University.

In 2007 she was invited to address the UN General Assembly regarding the ability of the internet to break down global barriers. Her speech warned that this was not what she anticipated.

She has been involved in running the LSE serving as the academic Governor from 2005 until 2010 and she became the Head of the Media and Communications Department in 2006 and served until 2009. She was interim Deputy Director in and the Provost from 2015 to 2016.

She joined the International Association for Media and Communication and rose to be its President from 2004 to 2008. After that she continued to be an active member of several of its committees. IAMCR honoured her with a Distinguished Contribution Award at their annual conference in 2017 in recognition of being an "IAMCR catalyst".

Mansell has been involved in the changes required to cope with new media including the changes in the law and international communication. She has noted however that new communication systems "..have not supplanted older means of communication" including free speech in public spaces.

In 2022, she was elected a Fellow of the British Academy (FBA), the United Kingdom's national academy for the humanities and social sciences.

== Works include ==
- Knowledge Societies: Information Technology for Sustainable Development 1998 (Ed.)
- Mobilizing the Information Society: Strategies for Growth and Opportunity 2000
- Imagining the Internet: Communication, Innovation and Governance 2012
- The International Encyclopedia of Digital Communication and Society 2015
