= Susan Marks =

Susan Marks, FBAis a British legal scholar, specialising in international law, human rights and legal theory including critical legal studies. She is Professor of International Law at the London School of Economics and Political Science. She was previously a fellow of Emmanuel College, Cambridge and a lecturer at King's College London, rising to Professor of Public International Law.

In July 2023, she was elected Fellow of the British Academy (FBA), the United Kingdom's national academy for the humanities and social sciences.

== Selected works ==
- Marks, Susan (2000). The riddle of all constitutions: international law, democracy, and the critique of ideology. Oxford; New York: Oxford University Press. ISBN 0198267983.
- Marks, Susan; Clapham, Andrew (2005). International human rights lexicon. Oxford; New York: Oxford University Press. ISBN 978-0198764144.
- Marks, Susan (2019). A false tree of liberty: human rights in radical thought. Oxford: Oxford University Press. ISBN 978-0199675456.
- Marks, Susan (2024). Trucanini's stare: reconsidering dignity in theory and practice. Hersch Lauterpacht Memorial Lectures (29). Cambridge: Cambridge University Press. ISBN 978-1009543231.
