= Devyani Sharma =

Sociolinguistics professor

Devyani Sharma FBA is the Professor of Language and Communication at the University of Oxford, across both the Faculty of English Language and Literature and the Faculty of Linguistics, Philology and Phonetics. She is also a Professorial Fellow at Worcester College, Oxford. Prior to this role she was a sociolinguistics professor and chair of the Linguistics department at Queen Mary University of London.

== Education ==
Sharma holds a PhD and MA in linguistics from Stanford University and a BA in anthropology/ linguistics and fine art from Dartmouth College.

== Research ==
Her research interests include language variation and change, syntactic variation and style. Sharma's work particularly focusses on these topics within World Englishes and British Asian communities. She has written widely on these topics for various publications and has recently served as an associate editor for the Journal of Sociolinguistics.

In recent years Sharma has completed an Economic and Social Research Council funded project on 'Dialect Style and Development in a Diasporic Community' with Ben Rampton and Roxy Harris, both at King's College London.

Sharma has published extensively on British Asian English in addition to a widely used volume on Research Methods with Rob Podesva.

She was elected a Fellow of the British Academy in 2023.

== Personal life ==
Sharma is the daughter of former Commonwealth Secretary-General Kamalesh Sharma.

== Works ==
- (ed. with Hundt) 'English in the Indian Diaspora'. Amsterdam: Benjamins. 2014.
- (ed. with Podesva) 'Research Methods in Linguistics'. Cambridge: Cambridge University Press. 2013.
- (ed. with Benor, Rose, Sweetland & Zhang) 'Gendered Practices in Language'. Stanford: CSLI. 2002.
