= Paula Jarzabkowski =

Economist and financial researcher

Paula Jarzabkowski FBA FASSA is a financial researcher and Professor of Strategic Management at the Bayes Business School, University of London.

== Biography ==
Jarzabkowski worked as the Professor of Strategic Management at Aston Business School from 2007 to 2013. She joined the University of London in 2016. Jarzabkowski was elected a Fellow of the British Academy in 2020 and she was elected a Fellow of the Academy of the Social Sciences in Australia in 2024.

== Select publications ==
- Jarzabkowski, P., Kavas, M., Krull, E. 2021. "It’s Practice. But is it Strategy? Reinvigorating strategy-as-practice by rethinking consequentiality", Organization Theory. doi:10.1177/26317877211029665
- Jarzabkowski, P., Lê, J., Balogun, J. 2019. "The Social Practice of Coevolving Strategy and Structure to Realize Mandated Radical Change", Academy of Management Journal 62 (3). doi:10.5465/amj.2016.0689
- Bednarek, R., Chalkias, K., and Jarzabkowski, P. 2019 "Managing Risk as a Duality of Harm and Benefit: A Study of Organizational Risk Objects in the Global Insurance Industry", British Journal of Management 32 (1), 235–254.
