= Susan Banducci =

American political scientist and academic (born 1966)

Susan Ann Banducci FBA (born 1966) is an American political scientist and academic, currently Professor of Politics and Turing Fellow at the University of Exeter. Her research focuses on inequalities in political participation, particularly gender.

== Career ==
Banducci was awarded a Doctor of Philosophy (PhD) degree in political science by University of California, Santa Barbara in 1995. Her doctoral thesis was titled "Voter confusion and voter rationality: The use of counter-propositions in direct legislation elections", and her doctoral advisor was Eric R.A.N. Smith.

== Career ==
She has taught at Oregon State University and Texas Tech University, and was a researcher at the University of Waikato, the University of Amsterdam and the University of Twente.

Appointed Professor of Politics at the University of Exeter in Britain in 2010, since 2024 she has been Professor of Politics and Turing Fellow at Exeter.

She is the Principal Investigator of TWICEASGOOD, which looks at the experience of women candidates on the campaign trail.

== Recognition ==
In 2022, Banducci was elected a Fellow of the British Academy (FBA), the United Kingdom's national academy for the humanities and social sciences.

In 2024 she became one of several 125th Anniversary Chairs at the University of Birmingham.

At the end of 2024, her publications had an h-index rating of 35.
