= Helen Steward =

British philosopher and academic (born 1965)

- Born: 29 May 1965 (age 60); Chester, England
- Occupation: Analytic philosopher
- Known for: Philosophy of Action, Philosophy of Mind, Metaphysics

Helen Catherine Steward, FBA (born 29 May 1965) is a British philosopher and academic. She is currently Professor of Philosophy of Mind and Action at the University of Leeds. Her research focusses on Philosophy of Action, Free Will, Philosophy of Mind and Metaphysics.

== Early life and education ==
Steward was born on 29 May 1965 in Chester, Cheshire, England. She studied philosophy, politics and economics at St Hilda's College, Oxford, graduating with a Bachelor of Arts (BA) degree in 1986. She then undertook the postgraduate Bachelor of Philosophy (BPhil) at St Cross College, Oxford, which she completed in 1988. She remained at the University of Oxford to undertake a Doctor of Philosophy (DPhil) degree, belonging to St Hugh's College and Lincoln College. Her doctoral thesis was titled "Events, states and processes: the ontology of mind", and was submitted in 1992. She completed her DPhil in 1993.

== Academic career ==
Steward was Salveson Junior Fellow at University College, Oxford for the 1990/91 academic year. From 1993 to 2007, she was fellow and tutor in philosophy at Balliol College, Oxford. She joined the University of Leeds in 2007 as an associate professor. Since 2013, she has been Professor of Philosophy of Mind and Action. In February 2015 she was awarded a Research Leadership Fellowship by the Arts and Humanities Research Council. She was president of the Aristotelian Society from 2019 to 2020.

Her interests include the metaphysics and ontology of mind and agency; the free will problem; the relation between humans and animals; and the philosophy of causation and explanation.

In 2021, Steward was elected a Fellow of the British Academy (FBA), the United Kingdom's national academy for the humanities and social sciences.

== Bibliography ==
=== Books ===
- A Metaphysics for Freedom, (Oxford: Oxford University Press, 2012) – BBIP podcast
- Agency and Action ed. H. Steward and John Hyman (Cambridge: CUP, 2004).
- The Ontology of Mind: Events, Processes and States (Oxford: OUP, 1997).

=== Selected articles ===
- 'What is a Continuant?', Proceedings of the Aristotelian Society, Supplementary Volume, LXXXIX, 2015: 109-23
- ‘Do Animals Have Free Will?’, The Philosophers’ Magazine, 68 (1), Apr 2015: 43-48
- A Metaphysics for Freedom, (Oxford: Oxford University Press, 2012) – BBIP podcast
- ‘Responses’, Inquiry 56 (2013): 681–706. (Contains Steward's responses to the comments of eight authors on her monograph, A Metaphysics for Freedom, to which a special issue of Inquiry was dedicated).
- 'Processes, Continuants and Individuals', Mind 122 (2013): 781-812
- 'Actions as Processes', Philosophical Perspectives 26:1 (2012): 373-88
