= Evelyn Simpson =

Evelyn Simpson may refer to:

- Evelyn Simpson Curenton (born 1953), American composer, pianist, organist, and vocalist
- Evelyn M. Simpson (1885–1963), English literary critic and scholar

== See also ==
- Simpson (name)
