= Dulais =

Dulais may refer to:

== Places ==
- Dulais Valley, one of the South Wales Valleys in southwest Wales north of the town of Neath, Wales.
- River Dulais, a river of Wales which has its source at Mynydd y Drum. It joins the River Neath after flowing over Aberdulais Falls

== People ==
- Grace Dulais Davies (born 1887 or 1888 – 1969), Welsh literature academic, winner of the Rose Mary Crawshay Prize
