= Jean Robertson =

Jean or Jeannie Robertson may refer to:

== People ==
- Jean Robertson (author) (Jean Bromley, 1913–1990), British scholar of English renaissance literature
- Jean Robertson (actress) (c.1894–1967), Australian stage and screen actress
- Jean Robertson Burnet (1920–2009), Canadian academic's maiden name
- Jean McKenzie (Jean Robertson McKenzie, 1901–1964), New Zealand diplomat
- Jean Forbes-Robertson (1905–1962), British actress
- Jeannie Robertson (1908–1975), Scottish folk singer

== Characters ==
- Jean Robertson-Holley (née Jean Robertson), a fictional character from Unclaimed
- Jean Robertson, a character and teratology of novels from Jane Duncan

== See also ==
- John Robertson (disambiguation) ("Jean" is French for "John")
- Jen Robertson (disambiguation)
- Robertson (surname)
