= Kelly's Directory =

Trade directory in the United Kingdom

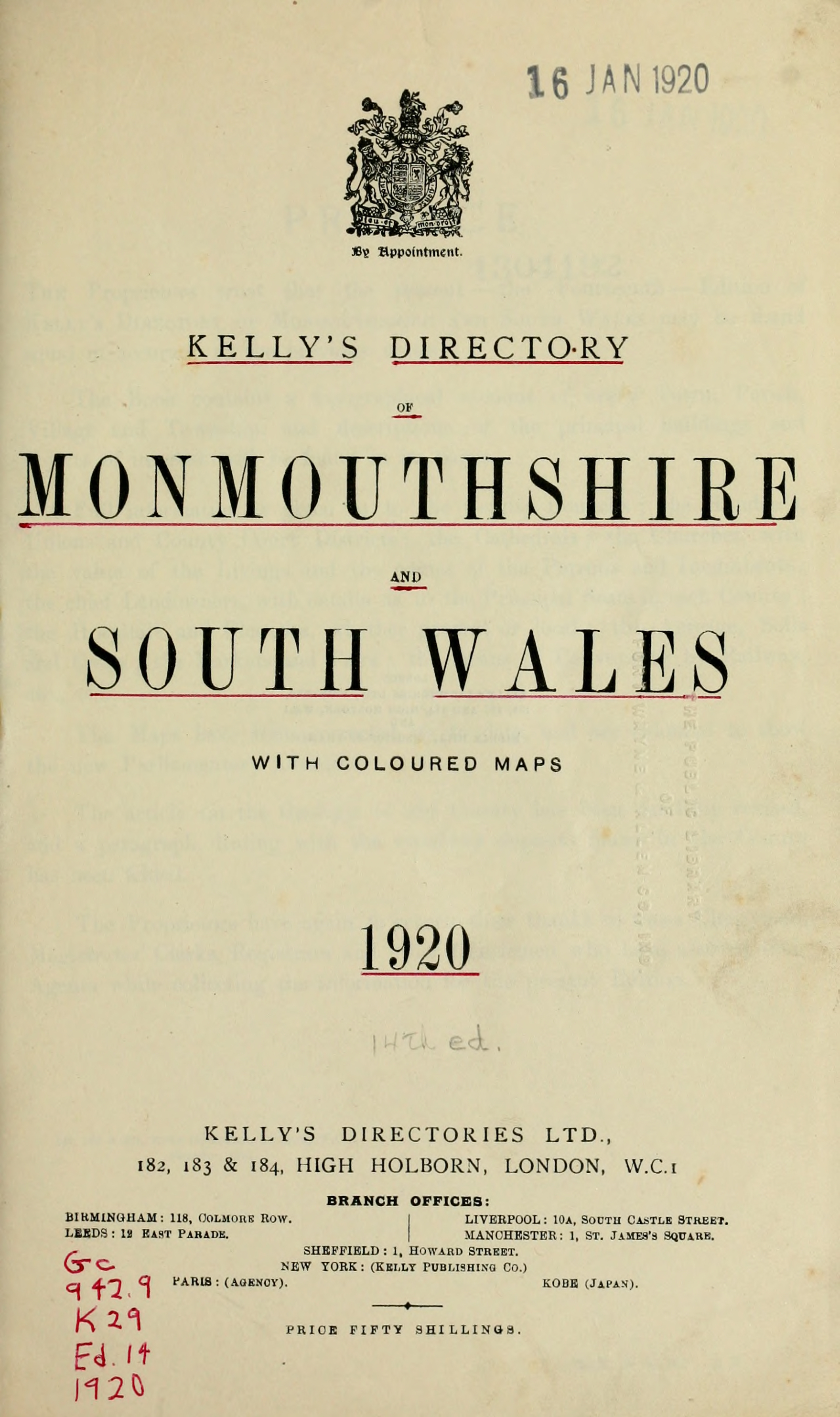
Title page of the 1920 Kelly's Directory of Monmouthshire and South Wales

Kelly's Directory (or more formally, the Kelly's, Post Office and Harrod & Co Directory) was a trade directory in Britain that listed all businesses and tradespeople in a particular city or town, as well as a general directory of postal addresses of local gentry, landowners, charities, and other facilities. In effect, it was a Victorian version of today's Yellow Pages. Many reference libraries still keep their copies of these directories, which are now an important source for historical research.

== Origins ==
The eponymous originator of the directory was Frederic Festus Kelly. In 1835 or 1836 he became chief inspector of letter-carriers for the inland or general post office, and took over publication of the Post Office London Directory, whose copyright was in private hands despite its semi-official association with the post office, and which Kelly had to purchase from the widow of his predecessor.

He founded Kelly & Co. and he and various family members gradually expanded the company over the next several decades, producing directories for an increasing number of UK counties and buying out, or putting out of business, various competing publishers of directories.

Other publications followed, including the Handbook to the Titled, Landed and Official Classes (1875) and Merchants, Manufacturers and Shippers (1877). In 1897, Kelly & Co Ltd became Kelly's Directories Ltd. This name stuck for another 106 years before being renamed Kellysearch in 2003 to reflect its focus away from hard copy directories and towards an Internet-based product search engine.

The front cover of a Kelly's Directory sometimes stated "Kelly's Directories Ltd., established 1799", however this was based on the date of issue of the first Post Office London Directory by an earlier inspector of letter carriers several decades before Kelly's involvement with that publication.

Kelly & Co Printers purchased the Middle Mill site on Kingston's Hogsmill River in 1879, becoming a major employer in the town. They closed production there in 1932 and moved to Andover.

== Kellysearch ==
For a short time, Kelly's existed online as Kellysearch, a directory similar to the online Yellow Pages. Kellysearch.com was established in Boston in 2004. It was in many different languages and introduced a fully searchable online-catalogue library and product press release section.

== Research ==
The old editions of the Kelly’s Directories are seen as highly collectable and have also become a useful reference tool for people tracing the history of local areas. The contents are available to buy on CD-ROM from many entrepreneurial sources for this purpose. An extensive but incomplete collection of Kelly's Directories is held in the Guildhall Library in London. The University of Leicester has an on-line collection of Historical Directories of England & Wales available for free.

== Bibliography ==
- Jane Elizabeth Norton (1950). Guide to the national and provincial directories of England and Wales, excluding London, published before 1856 (1984 reprint ed.). Offices of the Royal Historical Society. ISBN 0-86193-102-5. (original edition: ISBN 0-901050-15-6)
- A. V. Williams (1913). The development and growth of city directories. Williams directory co.
- Pendred, John (1955). "Appendix H: General Directories". In Pollard, Graham (ed.). The Earliest Directory of the Book Trade (reprint of 1785 ed.). pp. 83–84. ISBN 0-19-721759-1.
- Peter J. Atkins (1990). The directories of London, 1677-1977. Cassell and Mansell. ISBN 0-7201-2063-2.
