= Cowler =

Cowler is a surname. Notable people with the surname include:

- Rosemary Cowler (1925–2011), American scholar
- Sam Cowler (born 1992), English footballer
