= Rose Mary Crawshay Prize =

Literary prize for female scholars

The Rose Mary Crawshay Prize is a literary prize for female scholars, inaugurated in 1888 by the British Academy.

== Description ==
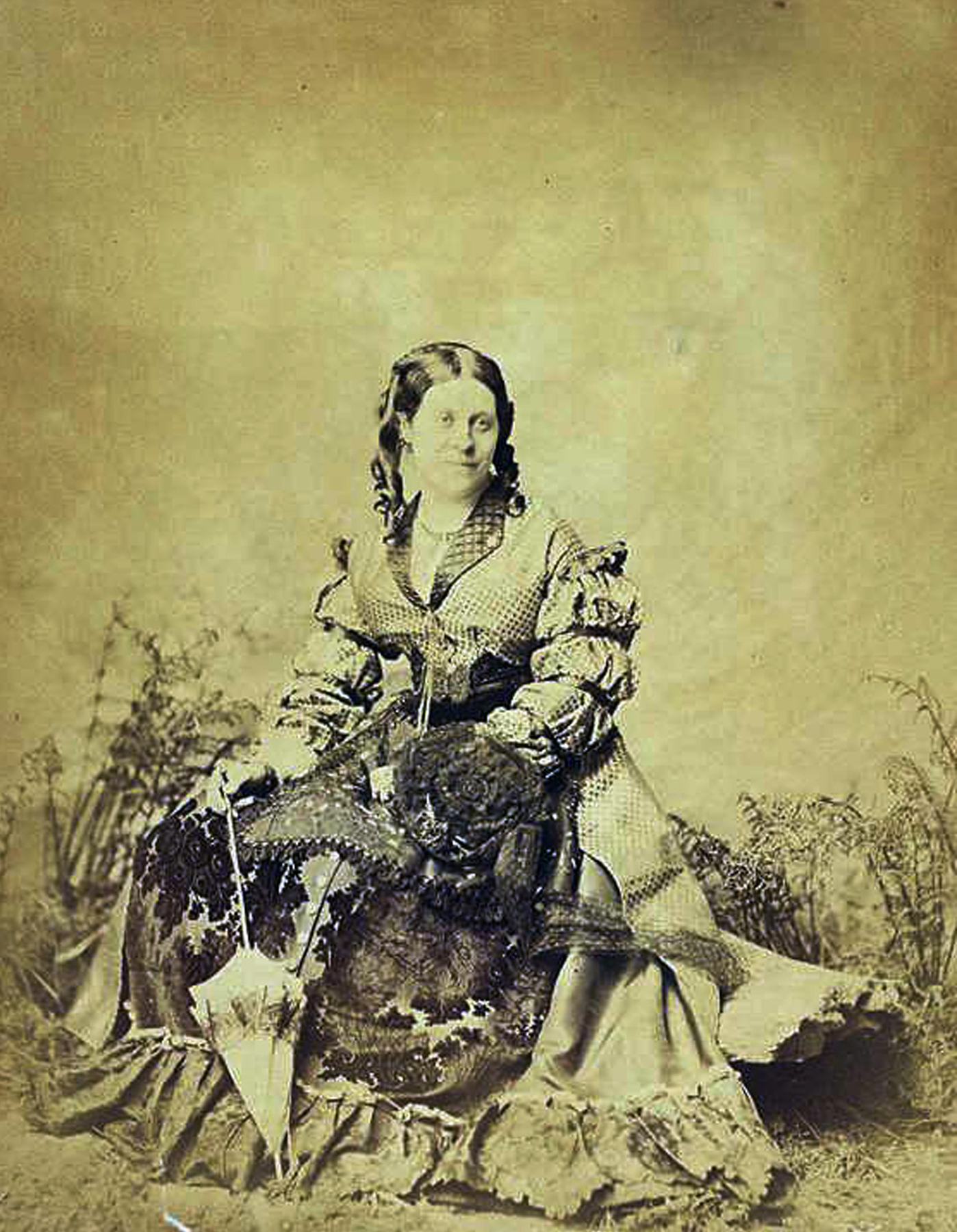
Suffragist Rose Mary Crawshay in the 1870s from the People's Collection of Wales

The prize, set up in 1888, is said by the British Academy to be the only UK literary prize specifically for female scholars. Two prizes can be awarded in any year, each "to a woman of any nationality who, in the judgement of the Council of the British Academy, has written or published within three years next preceding the year of the award an historical or critical work of sufficient value on any subject connected with English Literature, preference being given to a work regarding one of the poets Byron, Shelley and Keats". The prize is now "only" £500, but it provides a valuable recognition for non-fiction women writers. It has been awarded since 1916 by the British Academy.

The prize was established by Rose Mary Crawshay as the Byron, Shelley, Keats in Memoriam Prize Fund.

== Winners ==
Winners of the award have been:

| Year | Winner | Book | ISBN |
|---|---|---|---|
| 1916 | Charlotte Carmichael Stopes | Shakespeare's Environment | |
| 1917 | Leonie Villard | Jane Austen: Sa Vie et Son Oeuvre | |
| 1917 | M. Stawell | Shelley's Triumph of Life (published in Vol. 5 of Essays and Studies by members of the English Association) | |
| 1918 | Grace Dulais Davies | Historical Fiction of the Eighteenth Century | |
| 1919 | Mary Paton Ramsay | Les Doctrines Medievales Chez Donne | |
| 1920 | Jessie L. Weston | From Ritual to Romance | |
| 1921 | Mary Ethel Seaton | A Study of the Relations between England and the Scandinavian Countries in the Seventeenth Century Based upon the Evidence of Acquaintance in English writers with Scandinavian Literatures and Myths | |
| 1922 | Edith Clara Batho | James Hogg, the Ettrick Shepherd | |
| 1923 | Joyce M. S. Tompkins | A study of the Work of Mrs Radcliffe | |
| 1924 | Madeleine L. Cazamian | Le Roman et les Idees en Angleterre- Influence de la Science, 1860–1890 | |
| 1925 | No Award | | |
| 1926 | E. R. Dodds (Miss A. E. Powell) | The Romantic Theory of Poetry: an Examination in the light of Croce's Aesthetic | |
| 1927 | Alice Galimberti | L'Aedo d'Italia: Algernon Charles Swinburne (R. Sandron, 1925) | |
| 1928 | Enid Welsford | The Court Masque: A Study in the Relationship between Poetry and the Revels (Cambridge, 1927) | |
| 1929 | Hope Emily Allen | The Writings Ascribed to Richard Rolle, Hermit of Hampole, and Materials for his Biography (Modern Language Association of America, 1927) | |
| 1930 | Una Ellis-Fermor | For her work on Christopher Marlowe and her edition of Marlowe's Tamburlaine | |
| 1931 | Janet G. Scott | Les Sonnets Elisabethains (Champion, Paris, 1929) | |
| 1932 | Helen Darbishire | The Manuscript of Paradise Lost, Book 1 (Clarendon Press, 1931) | |
| 1933 | Eleanore Boswell | The Restoration Court Stage, 1660–1702 (Harvard University Press, 1932) | |
| 1934 | Giovanna Foà | Lord Byron, Poeta e Carbonaro (unpublished) | |
| 1935 | Hildegard Schumann | The Romantic Elements in John Keats' Writings | |
| 1936 | Caroline Spurgeon | Shakespeare's Imagery | |
| 1937 | Frances A. Yates | John Florio (Cambridge University Press, 1934) | |
| 1938 | Dorothy Hewlett (Mrs Kilgour) | Adonais | |
| 1939 | No Award | | |
| 1940 | Mary Lascelles (M. M. Lascelles) | Jane Austen and Her Art (Clarendon Press, 1939) | |
| 1941 | Julia Power | Shelley in America in the Nineteenth Century (University of Nebraska) | |
| 1942 | Sybil Rosenfeld | Strolling Players and Drama in the Provinces, 1660–1765 (Cambridge University Press) | |
| 1943 | Kathleen Mary Tillotson | Edition of the Poems of Michael Drayton | |
| 1944 | Katherine Balderston | Thraliana (Clarendon Press, 1942) | |
| 1945 | Rae Blanchard | The Correspondence of Richard Steele (Oxford University Press, 1941) | |
| 1946 | No Award | | |
| 1947 | Marjorie Hope Nicolson | Newton Demands the Muse: Newton's "Opticks" and the Eighteenth Century Poets (Princeton University Press) | |
| 1948 | No Award | | |
| 1949 | Rosemond Tuve | Elizabethan and Metaphysical Imagery | |
| 1950 | Helen Darbishire | For her Clark Lectures and collaboration in an edition Wordsworth's Poetical Works | |
| 1951 | Rosemary Freeman | For her work on Emblem Books | |
| 1952 | Mary Ethel Seaton | Abraham Fraunce's Arcadian Rhetorike | |
| 1953 | Helen Gardner | Divine Poems of John Donne | |
| 1954 | Alice Walker | Textual Problems of the First Folio | |
| 1955 | Evelyn M. Simpson | The Sermons of John Donne | |
| 1956 | Helen Estabrook | Sandison Poems of Sir Arthur Gorges | |
| 1957 | J. E. Norton | Gibbon's Letters | |
| 1958 | Mary Moorman | Biography of Wordsworth The Early Years | |
| 1959 | Kathleen Coburn | Notebooks of S.T. Coleridge, Vol. I., 1794–1804 | |
| 1960 | Joyce Hemlow | Biography of Fanny Burney | |
| 1961 | Vittoria Sanna | Sir Thomas Browne's "Religio Medici" | |
| 1962 | Barbara Hardy | The Novels of George Elliot | |
| 1963 | Joan Bennett | Sir Thomas Browne: His Life and Achievement | |
| 1964 | Aileen Ward | John Keats: The Making of a Poet | |
| 1965 | Madeline House | The Letters of Charles Dickens | |
| 1966 | Margaret Crum | Poems of Henry King | |
| 1967 | Enid Welsford | Salisbury Plain, a Study in the Development of Wordsworth's Mind and Art | |
| 1968 | Winifred Gérin | Charlotte Brontë: the Evolution of Genius | ISBN 978-0-19-881152-7 |
| 1969 | Alethea Hayter | Opium and the Romantic Imagination | |
| 1970 | Barbara Rooke | Coleridge's "The Friend" | |
| 1971 | No Award | | |
| 1972 | Valerie Eliot | For her edition of the facsimile of the original drafts of The Waste Land | |
| 1973 | Marilyn Butler | Maria Edgeworth: A literary Biography | |
| 1973 | Christina Colvin | Maria Edgeworth: Letters from England 1813–1844 | |
| 1974 | Jean Robertson | Her edition of Sir Philip Sidney's Old Arcadia | |
| 1975 | Doris Langley Moore | Lord Byron – Accounts Rendered | |
| 1976 | Hilary Spurling | Ivy When Young: The Early Life of Ivy Compton-Burnett 1884–1919 | |
| 1977 | Harriet Hawkins | Poetic Freedom and Poetic Truth | |
| 1978 | Lyndall Gordon | Eliot's Early Years | |
| 1979 | Elisabeth Murray | Caught in the Web of Words | |
| 1979 | Joan Rees | Shakespeare and the Story | |
| 1980 | Helen Gardner | The composition of the Four Quartets | |
| 1981 | Helen Peters | Her edition of Donne's Paradoxes and Problems | |
| 1982 | Mary Lascelles | The Story-Teller Retrieves the Past: Historical Fiction and Fictitious History in the Art of Scott, Stevenson, Kipling and some others | |
| 1982 | Annabelle Terhune | Her edition of Edward Fitzgerald's Complete Letters | |
| 1983 | Claire Lamont | Her edition of Scott's Waverley | |
| 1984 | Christine Alexander | The Early Writings of Charlotte Brontë | ISBN 0-631-12991-X |
| 1984 | Gillian Beer | Darwin's Plots: Evolutionary Narrative in Darwin, George Eliot and Nineteenth-Century Fiction | |
| 1985 | Penelope Fitzgerald | Charlotte Mew and her Friends | |
| 1985 | Anthea Hume | Edmund Spenser: Protestant Poet | |
| 1986 | Margaret Doody | The Daring Muse: Augustan Poetry Reconsidered | |
| 1986 | Ann Saddlemyer | The Collected Letters of John Millington Synge | |
| 1987 | Rosemary Cowler | The Prose Works of Alexander Pope | |
| 1987 | Iona Opie (with the late Peter Opie) | The Singing Game | |
| 1988 | Jane Millgate | Scott's Last Edition: A Study in Publishing History | |
| 1988 | Kathleen Tillotson | The Letters of Charles Dickens | |
| 1989 | Valerie Eliot | The Letters of T.S. Eliot 1888–1922 | |
| 1989 | Margaret Smith | Her edition of Charlotte Brontë's The Professor | |
| 1990 | Kathleen Coburn | Notebooks of Samuel Taylor Coleridge, ed. 4th Vol. | |
| 1990 | Norma Dalrymple-Champneys | Complete Poetical Works of George Crabbe, ed. 3 Vols | |
| 1991 | Anne Barton | The Names of Comedy | |
| 1991 | Valerie Rumbold | Women's Place in Pope's World | |
| 1992 | Antonia Forster | Book Reviews in England, 1749–1774 | |
| 1993 | Barbara Rosenbaum | Index of Literary Manuscripts, Volume IV, part 2: Hardy to Lamb | |
| 1993 | Margaret Reynolds | Her critical edition of Elizabeth Barrett Browning's Aurora Leigh | |
| 1994 | Margaret Cardwell | Her volume in the Clarendon edition of Great Expectations (CUP, 1993) | |
| 1994 | Janet Gezari | Charlotte Brontë and Defensive Conduct (Pennsylvania University Press, 1992) | |
| 1995 | Caroline Franklin | Byron's Heroines (CUP, 1993) | |
| 1995 | Jenny Uglow | Elizabeth Gaskell: A Habit of Stories (Faber & Faber, 1993) | |
| 1996 | Kate Flint | The Woman Reader 1837-1914 | ISBN 978-0-19-812185-5 |
| 1996 | Ruth Smith | Handel's Oratorios and Eighteenth Century Thought | ISBN 978-0-521-02370-2 |
| 1997 | Hermione Lee | Virginia Woolf (biography) | ISBN 978-0-375-70136-8 |
| 1998 | Moyra Haslett | Byron's Don Juan and the Don Juan Legend | ISBN 978-0-19-818432-4 |
| 1998 | Katie Trumpener | Bardic Nationalism: The Romantic Novel and the British Empire | ISBN 978-0-691-04480-4 |
| 1999 | Elizabet(h) Wright | Psychoanalytic Criticism. A Reappraisal | ISBN 978-0-415-92145-9 |
| 1999 | Karen O'Brien | Narratives of Enlightenment. Cosmopolitan History from Voltaire to Gibbon | ISBN 9780521619448 |
| 2000 | Marina Warner | No Go the Bogeyman: Scaring, Lulling and Making Mock | ISBN 978-0-374-22301-4 |
| 2000 | Joanne Wilkes | Lord Byron and Madame de Staël: Born for Opposition | ISBN 978-1-84014-699-8 |
| 2001 | Annette Peach | Portraits of Byron | |
| 2001 | Lucy Newlyn | Reading, Writing, and Romanticism: The Anxiety of Reception | ISBN 978-0-19-818711-0 |
| 2002 | Wendy Doniger | The Bedtrick: Tales of Sex and Masquerade | ISBN 978-0-226-15643-9 |
| 2002 | Kate Flint | The Victorians and the Visual Imagination | ISBN 978-0-521-08952-4 |
| 2003 | Jane Stabler | Byron, Poetics and History | ISBN 978-0-521-81241-2 |
| 2003 | Claire Tomalin | Samuel Pepys: The Unequalled Self | ISBN 978-0-375-72553-1 |
| 2004 | Maud Ellmann | Elizabeth Bowen: The Shadow Across the Page | ISBN 978-0-7486-1703-6 |
| 2004 | Anne Stott | Hannah More: The First Victorian | ISBN 978-0-19-927488-8 |
| 2005 | Claire Preston | Thomas Browne and the Writing of Early Modern Science | ISBN 978-0-521-83794-1 |
| 2005 | Judith Farr with Louise Carter | The Gardens of Emily Dickinson | ISBN 978-0-674-01829-7 |
| 2006 | Rosalind Ballaster | Fabulous Orients: Fictions of the East in England 1662-1785 | ISBN 978-0-19-923429-5 |
| 2007 | Susan Oliver | Scott, Byron and the Politics of Cultural Encounter | |
| 2008 | Helen Small | The Long Life | ISBN 978-0-19-922993-2 |
| 2009 | Frances Wilson | The Ballad of Dorothy Wordsworth | ISBN 978-0-571-23047-1 |
| 2009 | Molly Mahood | The Poet as Botanist | ISBN 978-0-521-86236-3 |
| 2010 | Daisy Hay | Young Romantics | ISBN 0-7475-8627-6 |
| 2011 | Fiona Stafford | Local Attachments: The Province of Poetry | ISBN 0-19-955816-7 |
| 2012 | Julie Sanders | The Cultural Geography of Early Modern Drama 1620-1650 | ISBN 1-107-00334-2 |
| 2014 | Hannah Sullivan | The Work of Revision | ISBN 0-674-07312-6 |
| 2015 | Catherine Bates | Masculinity and the Hunt: Wyatt to Spenser | ISBN 978-0199657117 |
| 2015 | Ankhi Mukherjee | What is a Classic? Postcolonial Rewriting and Invention of the Canon | ISBN 9780804785211 |
| 2016 | Lyndsey Stonebridge | The Judicial Imagination: Writing after Nuremberg | ISBN 978-0748642359 |
| 2017 | Kate Bennett | John Aubrey: Brief Lives with an Apparatus for the Lives of our English Mathematical Writers | ISBN 978-0199689538 |
| 2018 | Emma J. Clery | Eighteen Hundred and Eleven: Poetry, Protest and Economic Crisis | ISBN 978-1107189225 |
| 2019 | Marina MacKay | Ian Watt: the Novel and Wartime Critic | ISBN 978-0198824992 |
| 2020 | Marion Turner | Chaucer: A European Life | ISBN 978-0691160092 |
| 2021 | Helen Moore | Amadis in English, a Study in the Reading of Romance | ISBN 978-0198832423 |
| 2021 | Gillian Russell | The Ephemeral Eighteenth Century: Print, Sociability, and the Cultures of Collecting | ISBN 978-1108487580 |
| 2022 | Erica McAlpine | The Poet's Mistake | ISBN 9780691203478 |
| 2023 | Noémie Ndiaye | Scripts of Blackness: Early Modern Performance Culture and the Making of Race | ISBN 9781512822632 |
| 2023 | Claire Pettit | Serial Forms: The Unfinished Project of Modernity, 1815-1848 | ISBN 9780198830429 |
| 2024 | Katrin Ettenhuber | The Logical Renaissance: Literature, Cognition and Argument, 1479-1630 | ISBN 9780198881186 |
| 2025 | Alexandra Harris | The Rising Down: Lives in a Sussex Landscape | |
| 2026 | Dr Hester Lees-Jeffries | Textile Shakespeare | |

== See also ==
- List of literary awards honoring women
- Awards of the British Academy
