= Mary Freeman =

Mary Freeman may refer to:

- Mary Freeman (swimmer) (born 1933)
- Mary Freeman (marine biologist) (1924–2018)
- Mary Freeman Byrne (1886–1961), American author
- Mary Freeman-Grenville, 12th Lady Kinloss (1922–2012), British peer
- Mary Lou Freeman (1941–2006), American politician from Iowa
- Mary Eleanor Wilkins Freeman (1852–1930), American author
