= Tuve =

Tuve may refer to:

== People ==
=== Surname ===
- Merle Tuve (1901–1982), American geophysicist
- Rosemond Tuve (1903–1964), American scholar of English literature

=== Given name ===
- Tuve Hasselquist (1816–1891), Swedish church leader
- Tuve Skånberg (born 1956), Swedish politician

== Places ==
- Mount Tuve, Ellsworth Land, Antarctica
- Tuve, Sweden
