= Katie Trumpener =

Canadian academic (born 1961)

- Awards: Rose Mary Crawshay Prize and Berlin Prize

Academic background
- Education: University of Alberta; Harvard University; Stanford University

Academic work
- Discipline: English literature
- Institutions: Yale University
- Notable works: Bardic Nationalism: The Romantic Novel and the British Empire

Katie Trumpener (born 1961) is the Emily Sanford Professor of Comparative Literature and English at Yale University. She won a Rose Mary Crawshay Prize and Berlin Prize.

== Life ==
She received a B.A. in English from the University of Alberta in 1982, an A.M. in English and American literature from Harvard University in 1983, and a Ph.D. in comparative literature from Stanford University in 1990. Prior to joining the faculty at Yale in 2002, Trumpener taught at the University of Chicago from 1990. At Yale, Trumpener has served as acting director of the Whitney Humanities Center and the director of graduate studies in comparative literature. She also serves on the editorial committee of Public Culture and the editorial boards of New German Critique and Arcade.

Her work has been focused primarily on the late eighteenth century through to the present. Her interests include the history of the British and European novel, other anglophone fiction, European film history, and visual culture and music. She is currently researching and teaching on the history of children's literature, Jane Austen and British colonialism, and the institutionalization of Marxist aesthetics in postwar Central Europe.

Trumpener's first book, Bardic Nationalism: The Romantic Novel and the British Empire, published by Princeton University Press in 1997, was awarded the 1998 Modern Language Association Prize for a First Book and the British Academy's 1998 Rose Mary Crawshay Prize. The book links the literary and intellectual history of England, Scotland, and Ireland to that of the overseas colonies of the British Empire, studying the relation of these histories to the origins and formation of British cultural nationalism, the novel, and the literary history of the English-speaking world.

She also co-edited with Richard Maxwell The Cambridge Companion to Fiction in the Romantic Period, published in 2008. Her forthcoming The Divided Screen: The Cinemas of Postwar Germany will be published by Princeton University Press.

== Selected publications ==
- "Goethe in Chains. West Berlin 'at 750': The Politics of Commemoration". Telos 74 (Winter 1987–88). New York: Telos Press.

Awards and achievements
Preceded by Hermione Lee	Rose Mary Crawshay Prize; 1998 and Moyra Haslett	Succeeded by Elizabet(h) Wright; Karen O'Brien
