= Anthea Hume =

Anthea Hume (born 1933) is a British scholar of English literature, specialising in theological writings. She was a winner of the British Academy's Rose Mary Crawshay Prize in 1985.

Born in London, she obtained her doctorate from the University of London in 1961 with a dissertation titled A study of the writings of the English protestant exiles, 1525–35, excluding their biblical translations.

Hume was a faculty member of the University of Reading's department of English literature.

In 1973 came out the long-awaited publication of The Complete Works of Saint Thomas More. Vol. 8: The Confutation of Tyndale's Answer, in which appeared Hume's twenty-seven octavo page bibliography of English Protestant works published in Europe. This was an extension of her doctoral researches that investigated the consequences of religious persecution in England on publishers of Protestant tracts, who felt safer in printing them in Germany and the Low Countries.

Hume published Edmund Spenser, Protestant Poet in 1984. Some previous researchers had held that Edmund Spenser was not an overt Puritan, and that as he wasn't a theologian, it was difficult to label him a doctrinarian; other researchers insisted that Puritanism was a harsh creed and that he adhered to it, resulting in the poet being classified in a somewhat diffuse combination of fundamentalism and humanism. Hume identified Spenser with a radical Protestantism that was more moral than theological, therefore more admirable, basing her conclusions on her extensive readings of the sermons and treatises of William Fulke, Richard Greenham, James Bisse and others. She was focused on Spenser's Faerie Queene and Shepheardes Calendar, considering Protestantism's influence on the poet's imagery; her critical survey of Spenser's literature was appreciated. The book won the Rose Mary Crawshay Prize the next year.

== Selected works ==
- "English Protestant Books Printed Abroad, 1525-1535: An Annotated Bibliography". The Complete Works of St. Thomas More. Vol. 8. Yale University. 1973. II. App. B.
- Edmund Spenser, Protestant Poet. Cambridge University. 1984. ISBN 9780521258074
