= Jayne Ozanne =

Evangelical Anglican and LGBT rights campaigner

Deputy Jayne Ozanne OBE
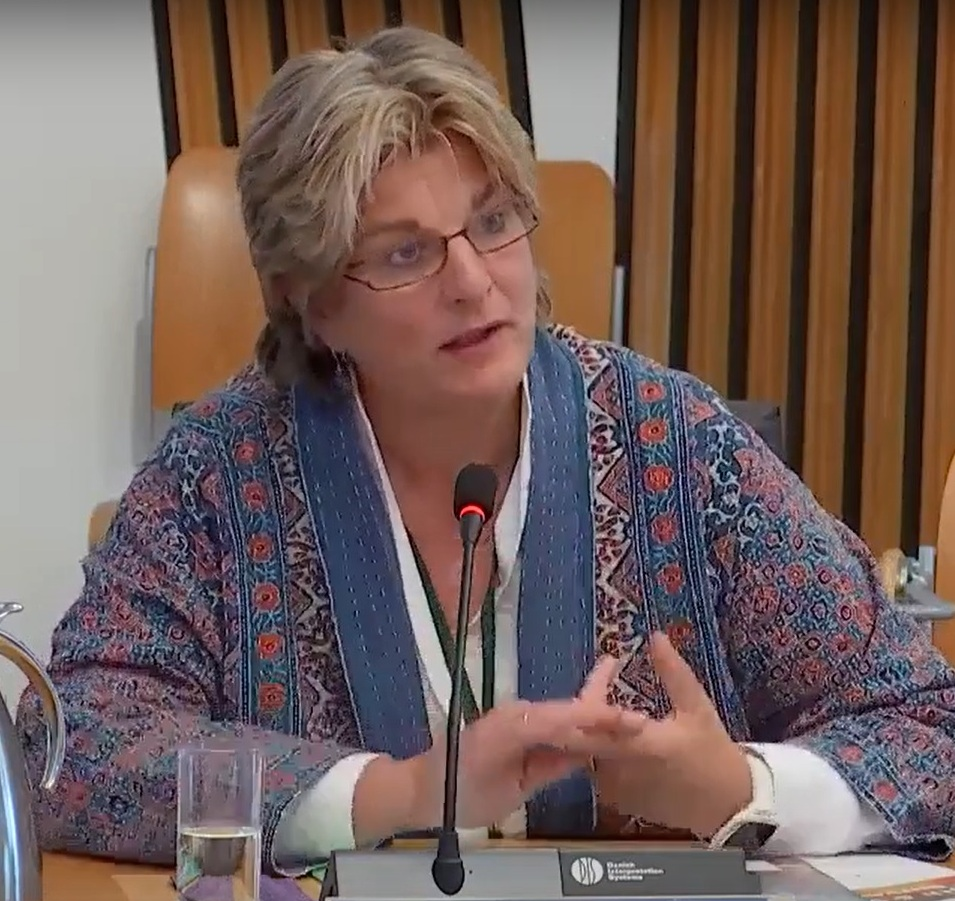
- Ozanne in 2021

Member of the States of Guernsey
- Incumbent
- Assumed office July 2025

Personal details
- Born: Jayne Margaret Ozanne; 13 November 1968 (age 57) Guernsey
- Known for: LGBT activism

Jayne Margaret Ozanne OBE (born 13 November 1968) is a British activist, politician and evangelical Anglican. Having come out publicly as gay in 2015, she campaigns to safeguard LGBTQI people from abuse. Ozanne founded and launched the Ozanne Foundation in 2017 which worked with religious organisations around the world on prejudice and discrimination LGBTQI people. The Foundation closed in September 2025. Ozanne founded and previously chaired the Ban Conversion Therapy Coalition. From January 1999 to December 2004, she was a member of the Archbishops' Council, the central executive body of the Church of England.

== Early life and education ==
Ozanne was born on 13 November 1968 in Barnstaple, Devon, England. She grew up in Guernsey, in a conservative and religious environment. She was educated at The Ladies' College, Guernsey, an all-girls private school in Guernsey. She studied mathematics at St John's College, Cambridge, one of the first female undergraduates to study the subject at the college. She graduated with a Bachelor of Arts (BA) degree in 1990. She later studied for a postgraduate certificate in international diplomacy as part of the Oxford University Diplomatic Studies Programme. During her work towards this qualification, she was a student at Magdalen College, Oxford.

== Career ==
After her undergraduate degree, Ozanne worked in brand management at Procter & Gamble (1990–93) and then Kimberly-Clark (1993–96). She then spent two years working as Head of Marketing at BBC Television. She founded Ozanne Consultancy Services in 1998.

After completing her postgraduate program and being a visiting research fellow at the Department of International Development, University of Oxford (2007–08) she moved in to fundraising. She was director of fund development for the World Association of Girl Guides and Girl Scouts (2010–11), head of fundraising partnerships at Oxfam GB (2011), director of fundraising for the Tony Blair Faith Foundation (2012) and director of fundraising for the Oxford Radcliffe Hospitals Charitable Funds (2014–16).

=== Church activism ===
Ozanne served her first period on the General Synod of the Church of England from 1999 to 2004. In 2014, she decided to become more publicly engaged with the sexuality debate within the Church. In 2015, she was elected back onto the General Synod. She has since been heavily involved in campaigning for equal rights for the LGBTI community. She has been described as "one of the Church of England's most influential evangelical campaigners".

Ozanne has called for the anti-LGBT verses in the Bible to be looked at again. She believes that they have been misinterpreted, stating "Until William Wilberforce came along, many evangelicals fundamentally believed it was right to treat black people as slaves."

She resigned as a member of the government's LGBT Advisory Panel in March 2021, accusing equalities ministers Liz Truss and Kemi Badenoch of "creating a 'hostile environment' for lesbian, gay, bisexual and transgender people" and "claiming she had sat in meetings with the pair and 'been astonished about how ignorant they are'".

Ozanne is founder of the Ban Conversion Therapy coalition. In November 2021 at Middle Temple, Ozanne participated in a debate on conversion therapy with CEO of Stonewall Nancy Kelley and "gender-critical" barrister Naomi Cunningham.

=== Ozanne Foundation ===
Ozanne is director of the Ozanne Foundation, granted charitable status in 2018. The Bishop of Liverpool Paul Bayes is chair of the foundation. The Ozanne Foundation works with religious organisations to end discrimination based on sexuality or gender.

In June 2020, the Ozanne Foundation created an inter-religious advisory board to fight discrimination. Members of the board include Dr Jagbi Jhutti-Johal, Anil Bhanot, Ursula Halligan, Dilwar Hussain, Laura Janner-Klausner, Frederick Hyde-Chambers, Hannah Brock Womack, Revd David Mayne, and Revd Michaela Youngson.

In December 2021, the Ozanne Foundation Awards presented awards to Gregory Cameron, Alicia Kearns, Helena Kennedy, Baroness Kennedy of The Shaws, and Jeremy Marks, for what Bayes described as "significant impact on the lives of LGBT+ people, particularly those living in faith settings". Ozanne said: "I am thrilled that we are able to recognise some of our unsung heroes who have given so much in the fight for equality".

Ozanne obtained a research fellowship in 2024 from Regent's Park College at the University of Oxford, where she has since published in the Oxford Journal of Law and Religion in 2025.

=== Politics ===
In the 2025 Guernsey general election, Ozanne stood as an independent candidate for the States of Guernsey. On 18 June 2025, she was elected a deputy with 6,197 votes. In July 2025, she became vice-president of the Committee for Employment & Social Security.

=== Honours ===
On 22 November 2024, Ozanne was made a Doctor of the University of Kent. Professor Ben Cosh gave her oration and she then gave a speech in Canterbury Cathedral.

In December 2025, for her service to religion and the LGBTQ+ community, Ozanne was appointed Officer of the Order of the British Empire (OBE) in the 2026 New Year Honours.

== Personal life ==
Having previously believed that being Christian and being gay were not compatible, Ozanne sought a deliverance ministry and underwent an exorcism. She also lived a celibate lifestyle, refraining from any sexual relationship. At the age of 28, having struggled with depression, she had a nervous breakdown which resulted in her being admitted to hospital.

In 2009, after years of personal struggle as an evangelical Christian trying to reconcile her faith with her sexuality, Ozanne came out as gay to her friends and family. She then entered into a long-term relationship with another woman, although they separated after five years together. She publicly came out in 2015.

== Selected work ==
- Ozanne, Jayne, ed. (2016). Journeys in Grace and Truth: Revisiting Scripture and Sexuality. London: Ekklesia. ISBN 978-0993294242.
- Ozanne, Jayne (2018). Just Love: A journey of self-acceptance. London: Darton, Longman & Todd Ltd. ISBN 978-0232533750.
