= Helen Small =

New Zealand academic

Helen Wenda Small FBA (born 23 October 1964) is the Merton Professor of English Language and Literature at the University of Oxford and a fellow of Merton College, Oxford. She was previously a fellow of Pembroke College, Oxford.

== Early life ==
Small was born on 23 October 1964 in Wellington, New Zealand. Her parents are Colin McEwen Small and Wenda Mary Lavinia Heald. She attended Queen Margaret College, Wellington. She received a bachelors of arts degree in English from the Victoria University of Wellington in 1985 and a bachelor of arts with honours degree the following year. She received a Ph.D. from St Catharine's College, Cambridge, in 1991 and was made an honorary fellow in 2018. Her partner is Tim Gardam and she has one daughter.

== Career ==
Small worked as a residential fellow at St Catharine's College between 1990 and 1993, before working as a lecturer in English at the University of Bristol between 1993 and 1996. She was a lecturer at Pembroke College, Oxford, before becoming a professor and then a Jonathan and Julia Aisbitt Fellow in English Literature between 1996 and 2018. She was the recipient of a Leverhulme Research Fellowship from 2001 to 2004. She began working as a fellow of Merton College, Oxford, in 2018 and as the Merton Professor of English Language and Literature.

In addition to her academic roles, Small is a governor of Oxford High School.

== Published works ==
- Love's Madness: Medicine, the Novel, and Female Insanity, 1800–1865 (Oxford University Press, 1996)
- The Public Intellectual (editor; Blackwell, 2002)
- Literature, Science, Psychoanalysis, 1830–1970: Essays in Honour of Gillian Beer (editor, with Trudi Tate; Oxford University Press, 2003)
- The Long Life (Oxford University Press, 2007)
- The Value of the Humanities (Oxford University Press, 2013)

== Awards and recognition ==
- 2008: Rose Mary Crawshay Prize, The Long Life
- 2008: Truman Capote Award for Literary Criticism, The Long Life
- 2018: Elected Fellow of the British Academy
- 2021: Elected Fellow of the English Association

Awards and achievements
| Preceded by Susan Oliver | Rose Mary Crawshay Prize; 2008 | Succeeded by Frances Wilson; Molly Mahood |
