= Sybil Rosenfeld =

English historian of theatre

Sybil Marion Rosenfeld (January 20, 1903, Bayswater, London – October 2, 1996, London) was an English historian of the theatre. She was a winner of the Rose Mary Crawshay Prize (1942), and an Honorary Fellow of King's College London. She is recognised for expanding the scope of academic research in drama from texts to organisation of theatres, biographies of actors, and scene design.

== Life ==
Sybil Marion Rosenfeld was born in Bayswater, London in 1903 to Sidney and Ethel Rosenfeld, a Jewish family with businesses in England and Czechoslovakia. She attended King's College, London, graduating with top honours at the age of 19. Encouraged by Allardyce Nicoll, she pursued a master's degree in the history of the theatre, focusing on George Etherege.

Rosenfeld ran a Jewish society for girls in Paddington; before the Second World War, she moved into an apartment in Bayswater where she spent the rest of her life. With independent means, she did not have to work for a living. She travelled extensively before the war, and briefly worked for the League of Nations.

Rosenfeld's book Strolling Players and Drama in the Provinces, 1660-1765 won the Rose Mary Crawshay Prize for 1942. It was reviewed as enthusiastic, yet scholarly and lauded for recovering the personages that enabled theatre to survive through the times of Cromwellian repression after the English Civil War.

In 1945, Rosenfeld became a co-editor of the journal Theatre Notebook founded by Ifan Kyrle Fletcher, a role she held for twenty five years, and to which she contributed over 80 articles. She also was a co-founder of the Society for Theatre Research in 1948, of which she was an officer in various positions till her death. The Society was instrumental in the formation of the Theatre Museum Association in 1955, which eventually led to the establishment of the Theatre Museum in London.

She wrote The York Theatre, her definitive account of the York Theatre Royal in 1948. This remained unpublished till after her death, when it was released by the Society for Theatre Research. Her pamphlet Foreign Theatrical Companies in Great Britain in the 17th and 18th Centuries (1955) explored the interactions between Italian and French drama companies in London, while Theatre of the London Fairs in the 18th Century (1960) brought out a hitherto unresearched area of the history of English theatre, its popular aspect. She then considered amateur theatre presented by aristocratic society in Temples of Thespis (1978).

In 1963, she was honoured with a Doctor of Letters by the Western College for Women, Ohio.

She switched her attention to British scene design and published two well-received books, A Short History of Scene Design in Great Britain (1972) and Georgian Scene Painters and Scene Painting (1982). Her 1984 book The Georgian Theatre of Richmond Yorkshire uncovered detail about the only surviving 18th century theatre in England, which was instrumental in its restoration.

In 1992, she was made an Honorary Fellow of King's College London.

Rosenfeld died in London on October 2, 1996.

== Selected works ==
- The Letterbook of Sir George Etherege (Ed.). 1928.
- Strolling Players and Drama in the Provinces, 1660-1765. 1939.
- Theatre of the London Fairs in the 18th Century. 1960.
- A Short History of Scene Design in Great Britain. 1972.
- Temples of Thespis. 1978.
- Georgian Scene Painters and Scene Painting. 1982.
- The Georgian Theatre of Richmond Yorkshire. 1984.

== Bibliography ==
- "The British Academy". The Times. 16 July 1942.
- Clarke, Austin (1943). "Strolling Players and Drama in the Provinces, 1660-1765, by Sybil Rosenfeld. Cambridge University Press. 1939". The Dublin Magazine. NS 18 (1).
- "Western College to present two honorary degrees". The Palladium-Item and Sun Telegram. Richmond, Indiana. 7 October 1963.
- "Notices under the Trustee Act 1925, s 27". London Gazette. 13 February 1997.
- van der Merwe, Pieter (7 October 1996). "Obituary: Sybil Rosenfeld". The Independent. Archived from the original on 26 May 2022.
- Speaight, George (17 October 1996). "Sybil Rosenfeld: Theatre History, Centre Stage". The Guardian.
- "Stage at the heart of York". The York Press. 6 November 2003.
