= Hildegard Schumann =

German scholar (1907–1986)

- Born: August 31, 1907; Epping, Essex
- Died: March 16, 1986 (aged 78); Rostock
- Citizenship: German
- Education: University of Hamburg
- Writing career
- Subject: English literature
- Notable work: Die romantischen Elemente bei John Keats
- Notable awards: Rose Mary Crawshay Prize (1935)

Hildegard Schumann (August 31, 1907, Epping – March 16, 1986, Rostock) was a German scholar of English and American studies, and a specialist in the works of John Steinbeck. She was a winner of the Rose Mary Crawshay Prize (1935).

== Life ==
Hildegard Edith Schumann was born in Epping, England, to Edith and Walther D. Schumann, a commercial clerk. The family returned to Germany and Schumann finished her secondary education in Hamburg, graduating from the University of Hamburg in English, German and art history in 1932. She received a scholarship to Bedford College, London (1928–1929). Back in Hamburg, she submitted her dissertation Die romantischen Elemente bei John Keats - Sein Verhältnis zu Mittelalter und Antike (The Romantic Elements in John Keats' Writings) in 1934, which won the Rose Mary Crawshay Prize the following year.

She taught languages at the Berlitz School in Hamburg for a year, and in 1936, emigrated to England, being politically opposed to the Nazi government in Germany. She stayed in the England till the end of the Second World War, teaching languages at schools in Seaford and London, working as a kindergarten director for Greenwich council, and as a modern languages editor for George G. Harrap and Co.

In 1947, Schumann left England for the German Democratic Republic. She joined the Humboldt University of Berlin as a lecturer of English. In 1954, she was promoted to senior lecturer in English literary history following her habilitation thesis titled Probleme des kritischen Realismus bei John Steinbeck (Problems of Critical Realism with John Steinbeck). In 1956, she became a professor of English and American literature at the University of Rostock, the first woman to achieve this seniority at that institution. She served as Dean of the university from 1959.

In 1963, Schumann became a vice-president of the German-British Society.

Schumann retired in 1967. She died in 1986 in Rostock.

== Research ==
Schumann co-wrote a textbook for German students, German Short Stories of Today (1951), which was considered a good representation of modern German literature. While the preponderance of war stories was objected to, the situations and diverse topics were well-suited to intermediate students.

Some of Schumann's research was influenced by her socialist thinking. Her article Koenig Lear (King Lear, 1965) explained this was Shakespeare's social critique, differentiating between Edmund's ruthless rationalistic takeover of the kingdom and the feeble attempt of Lear's supporters to preserve the feudal order. She rejected Jan Kott's conflation of the humanism of Shakespeare with the absurdism of Beckett, claiming that it was false to read King Lear as an expression of despair in the human condition.

== Selected works ==
- John Keats und das romantische Bewußtsein. De Gruyter. 1938.
- Hildegard Schumann; G. M. Wolff, eds. (1951). German Short Stories of Today. Boston: D. C. Heath & Co.
- Zum Problem Des Kritischen Realismus Bei John Steinbeck. V.M. Niemeyer. 1958.
- "Zum Falstaff-Problem in 'Heinrich IV'". Shakespeare-Jahrbuch. 108. 1972.

== Bibliography ==
- Odor, Anna F. (1952). "Reviewed Work: German Short Stories of Today by E. Hildegard Schumann, G. M. Wolff". The German Quarterly. 25 (2). JSTOR 401285.
- Directory of East German Officials. Central Intelligence Agency. 1964.
- Wentersdorf, Karl P. (1967). "Reviewed Work: Shakespeare Jahrbuch. by Anselm Schlösser, Armin-Gerd Kuckhoff". Shakespeare Quarterly. 18 (1). JSTOR 2868080.
- Nicolaescu, Mădălina (2014). "Kott in the East". In Adrian Poole (ed.). Empson, Wilson Knight, Barber, Kott. Great Shakespeareans. Vol. XIII. ISBN 9781472578617.
- Haas, Renate (2015). "Europe and beyond". Rewriting Academia: The Development of the Anglicist Women’s and Gender Studies of Continental Europe. Peter Lang. ISBN 978-3-653-95443-2.
- "Schumann, Hildegard" (in German). University of Rostock.
