= Fiona Stafford =

English literary scholar and academic (born 1960)

Fiona Stafford FBA FRSE
- Born: 1960 (age 65–66); Lincoln, England
- Occupations: Literary scholar and academic
- Title: Professor of English Language and Literature
- Awards: Rose Mary Crawshay Prize (2011)

Academic background
- Education: University of Leicester; University of Oxford

Fiona J. Stafford FBA FRSE (born July 1960) is an English literary scholar and academic. She is a Professor of English Language and Literature at the University of Oxford and a Fellow of Somerville College. She is a specialist in Romantic literature in English, and has also written about the influence of the Romantics on modern literature.

== Early life and education ==
Stafford was born in Lincoln but moved around during her childhood following her father's postings in the Royal Air Force. She studied for a BA in English language and literature at the University of Leicester, writing a dissertation on RAF slang. She then studied at the University of Oxford gaining an M.Phil. in English Language and Literature and a D.Phil. Her thesis was on The sublime savage: A study of James Macpherson and the poems of Ossian in relation to the cultural context of Scotland in the 1750s and 1760s.

== Career ==
Stafford's first academic appointment was as a British Academy postdoctoral fellow at Lincoln College, Oxford. After a short spell teaching in the United States, she returned to Oxford and was appointed a tutorial fellow of Somerville College. She is also Professor of English Language and Literature in the Faculty of English of the University of Oxford.

Her areas of research include "Ossian, Austen, Burns, Wordsworth, Coleridge, Keats, the Shelleys, Byron, Heaney, Carson, literature of the Romantic period, the literature of place, nature writing (old and new), Scottish poetry after 1700, dialogues between English, Irish and Scottish literature, literature and the visual arts, and contemporary poetry".

In 2006 Stafford was elected a fellow of the Royal Society of Edinburgh. In 2018 she was elected a Fellow of the British Academy.

In 2019 the University of Leicester conferred on her an honorary doctorate of letters.

=== Media work ===
In 2019 Stafford appeared in an episode of the BBC Radio 4 series In Our Time on Robert Burns alongside Murray Pittock and Robert Crawford. She returned in 2022 for an episode focused on Jane Austen's novel Persuasion alongside Paddy Bullard and Karen O'Brien, and in 2026 for an episode on John Keats with Meiko O'Halloran and Nicholas Roe.

== Selected publications ==
- Time and Tide: The Long, Long Life of Landscape. John Murray. 2024. ISBN 9781473686328.
- The Brief Life of Flowers. John Murray. 2018. ISBN 978-1473686359.
- The Long, Long Life of Trees. Yale UP. 2016. ISBN 978-0300228205.
- Reading Romantic Poetry. Wiley/Blackwell. 2012. ISBN 9781405191555.
- Local Attachments: The Province of Poetry. OxfordUP. 2010. ISBN 978-0199558162. (winner of the Rose Mary Crawshay Prize, 2011
- Brief Lives: Jane Austen. Hesperus. 2008. ISBN 9781843919063.
- Starting Lines in Scottish, English, and Irish Poetry: From Burns to Heaney. Oxford UP. 2000. ISBN 0198186371.
- The Last of the Race: The Growth of a Myth from Milton to Darwin. Oxford UP. 1994. ISBN 9780198112228.
- The Sublime Savage: James Macperson and The Poems of Ossian. Edinburgh UP. 1988. ISBN 9780852245699.
- Wordsworth and Coleridge, Lyrical Ballads, ed. F. Stafford, Oxford World's Classic. Oxford UP. 2013.
- Burns and Other Poets, ed. D. Sergeant and F. Stafford. Edinburgh UP. 2012.
- Jane Austen's Emma: A Casebook of Criticism. Oxford UP. 2007. ISBN 9780195175301.
- From Gaelic to Romantic: Ossianic Translations, ed. F. Stafford and H. Gaskill. Rodopi. 1998.
