= Helen Peters =

Canadian academic (1942–2026)

- Born: Helen Ruth Katherine Peters; 1942; St. John's, Newfoundland, Canada
- Died: 8 January 2026 (aged 83)

Academic background
- Education: B.A., M.A. Memorial University of Newfoundland
- Alma mater: University of Oxford
- Thesis: A critical edition of John Donne's Paradoxes and problems, with textual and literary introductions and commentary (1977)

Academic work
- Discipline: English literature
- Institutions: Memorial University of Newfoundland
- Main interests: John Donne; Theatre of Newfoundland

Helen Ruth Katherine Peters (1942 – 8 January 2026) was a Canadian scholar of English literature and a specialist in the theatre of Newfoundland. She was a winner of the British Academy's Rose Mary Crawshay Prize for 1981.

== Background ==
Helen Ruth Katherine Peters was born in 1942 in St. John's, Newfoundland.

She obtained B.A. (1971) and M.A. (1972) degrees in English from the Memorial University of Newfoundland. She was a holder of the University Medal in English in 1971. She went to Somerville College, Oxford for doctoral studies, where she was a Mary Somerville Fellow. She obtained a DPhil degree in 1978 with a thesis on John Donne.

Peters joined the faculty of Memorial University in 1984. She was elected to the university's Senate in 1993.

She was a member of the board of the Newfoundland Quarterly, a cultural and literary journal.

Peters retired in 2004. She died on 8 January 2026, at the age of 83.

== Research ==
In 1980, Peters edited and produced the first critical text of John Donne's Paradoxes and Problems. This program had been started by Evelyn Simpson and continued by Helen Gardiner, under whom Peters worked on her doctoral dissertation, which led to the publication of this text. She incorporated ten paradoxes and nineteen problems into the canon, discarding two paradoxes as possibly inauthentic. She showed that Donne's first edition of the work in 1633 had omissions and corruptions, rendering it unsuitable for a modern standard text, and used material from subsequent prints to create her critical text. Her derivation of Donne's paradoxes from the classical style of argumentation (the mock encomium and the argument against received opinion) was well articulated but her dating of the works and placement in relation to Donne's poetry was deemed problematic, given the large amount of extant counter-evidence that showed affinities between the paradoxes and his prose rather than his verse. The book won the British Academy's Rose Mary Crawshay Prize in 1981.

Peters shifted her attention to the theatre of Newfoundland with her edition of The Plays of CODCO (1992), a professional alternative dramatics group known for its monologues, mime, dance and tough humour. A socially activist troupe, CODCO helped to counter mainland Canadian views of Newfoundlanders as simple-minded fishermen. She explored cultural identity in the theatre and in 1994, convened a workshop for the International Federation for Theatre Research, which resulted in a special publication of the journal Theatre Research International, edited by her.

In 1996, she edited and published a collection of Newfoundland and Labrador plays, Stars in the Sky Morning.

== Selected works ==
- Donne, John (1980). Peters, Helen (ed.). Paradoxes and Problems. Oxford: Clarendon Press.
- Peters, Helen, ed. (1992). The Plays of CODCO. New York: Peter Lang Publishing, Inc.
- Lynde, Denyse; Peters, Helen; Buehler, Richard, eds. (1993). Proceedings of the Workshop on Newfoundland Theatre Research. Memorial University.
- Peters, Helen, ed. (1996). Stars in the Sky Morning: Ten Plays Created in the Tradition of Collective Theatre. Creative Book Publishing. ISBN 978-1895387742.
- Baker, Melvin; Peters, Helen; Ryan, Shannon, eds. (1997). People of the Landwash: Essays on Newfoundland and Labrador. St. John's: Harry Cuff.
