= Rosemary Freeman =

British scholar of English literature

Rose Mary Freeman (9 December 1913, London – 9 March 1972, London) was a British scholar of English literature, a reader at Birkbeck College, and a specialist in Edmund Spenser. She won the British Academy's Rose Mary Crawshay Prize in 1951.

== Life ==
Rosemary Freeman was the daughter of George Sydney Freeman and Adela Mary Grace Field. She was educated at the St Paul's Girls' School, London, and graduated from Girton College, Cambridge. She held a fellowship at Smith College in Massachusetts in 1937–1938. During the Second World War, she taught at Queen Mary College, London and Birkbeck. In 1958-1959, she was an Ottilie Hancock fellow at Girton College. She was a reader in English literature at Birkbeck College, and a University examiner for teaching colleges.

The marine biologist Mary Freeman was her brother Richard's wife.

Freeman's investigations into the English Emblem books led to her eponymous publication in 1948, which won the Rose Mary Crawshay Prize in 1951. This was considered a pioneering study and remained the standard work for decades.

Noting in the above book that the striking visual imagery in Edmund Spenser's poetry was a mirror of Renaissance emblems, Freeman conducted a years-long research into his oeuvre. Two books resulted: a short life and times of the poet in the British Council's "Writers and Their Work" series (1962), then The Faerie Queen: A Companion for Readers (1970). The latter book received mixed reviews: her judgments were considered sensible and balanced yet her interpretations were thought comparatively unperceptive.

Freeman died on 9 March 1972.

== Selected works ==
- English Emblem Books. Chatto & Windus. 1948.
- Edmund Spenser. Longmans, Green & Co. 1962.
- 'The Faerie Queene': A Companion for Readers. Berkeley: University of California. 1970.
