= Julia Power =

Julia Power (died June 22, 1960) was an American lecturer of English literature. A specialist in Shelley, she was a winner of the Rose Mary Crawshay Prize (1941).

She was born in Newcastle, Dixon County, Nebraska. She attended the University of Nebraska, where she obtained her bachelor of arts degree in English, and a doctorate (1938) with a dissertation on the poet Shelley. Her thesis, Shelley in America in the Nineteenth Century, won the Rose Mary Crawshay Prize in 1941.

In 1929, Power travelled to England, attending lectures at Cambridge.

Prior to her doctorate, Power had been a teacher at the Bancroft High School and other schools in Nebraska. She taught at St Teresa College in Kansas City, Missouri, as well as Omaha University, Montana State College and the University of Minnesota. She was superintendent of Johnstown, Nebraska schools in 1943.

Power died June 22, 1960, age 72 in Lincoln, Nebraska.
