= Mary Lascelles =

British literary scholar (1900–1995)

Mary Lascelles FBA
- Born: 7 February 1900
- Died: 10 December 1995 (aged 95)
- Awards: Rose Mary Crawshay Prize, British Academy (1940 and 1980)

Academic background
- Education: Lady Margaret Hall, Oxford

Academic work
- Discipline: English Literature
- Sub-discipline: Jane Austen; Shakespeare; Samuel Johnson; Walter Scott

Mary Madge Lascelles FBA (7 February 1900 – 10 December 1995) was a British literary scholar, specialising in Jane Austen, Shakespeare, Samuel Johnson, and Walter Scott. She was vice-principal of Somerville College, Oxford, from 1947 to 1960, and a university lecturer then reader in English literature 1960 from to 1967 at the University of Oxford.

== Early life and education ==
Lascelles was born on 7 February 1900 on Grenada, then a British colony, to Madeline Lascelles (née Barton) and William Horace Lascelles. Her paternal grandfather was Henry Lascelles, 4th Earl of Harewood.

When she was three, her family moved back to England, where they lived successively in Monmouth, Suffolk, and then Norfolk. She learnt to read only at the age of eight, having previously been read to by her parents. Her early education was by governess, before attending Sherborne School for Girls, a private boarding school, from the age of 15. In 1919 Lascelles matriculated into Lady Margaret Hall, Oxford, then an all-girls college of the University of Oxford, to study English. Her tutor was Janet Spens and she also attended lectures by Walter Raleigh. She graduated with a first class Bachelor of Arts (BA) degree in 1922; women had been allowed to graduate with degrees from Oxford only since 1920. From 1922 she undertook postgraduate studies under the supervision of George Stuart Gordon.

In 1923 she also held a research studentship at Westfield College, during which she "had access to an unpublished manuscript of a little-known Scottish version of the Alexander story, Sir Gilbert Haye's Buik of King Alexander the Conqueror" which was held at the British Museum. She completed her Bachelor of Letters (BLitt) degree in 1926. Her thesis was later published as, "Alexander and the Earthly Paradise in Mediaeval English Writings" in Medium Ævum.

== Academic career ==
After leaving Oxford, Lascelles was briefly a teacher at St Leonards School, a private school in St Andrews, Scotland. She then moved to Royal Holloway College, London, where she had been appointed assistant lecturer in 1936. There, she was required to give 13 lectures a week during the following two years. One of the lecture courses was on Jane Austen.

In 1931, Lascelles moved to Somerville College, Oxford, where she had been appointed a tutor in English Language and Literature. The following year, in 1932, she was elected a fellow of Somerville College. Her early teaching requirements were focused on "literature from the Middle Ages to 1830". During the Second World War, she continued teaching at Oxford; this included teaching English at Somerville and "lecturing to naval cadets in the men's college". She also acted as secretary to the Home Guard unit based near her parents' home in Norfolk during the long vacations (summer holidays). From 1947 to 1960, she also served as vice-principal of Somerville College under Dame Janet Vaughan. In 1960, she was appointed a university lecturer in English literature, and thereby had to stop tutoring, although she retained her fellowship as a professorial fellow. From 1966 to 1967, she was Reader in English Literature. In 1967, with her eyesight fading, she retired from full-time academia and was appointed an honorary fellow of Somerville College.

== Later life ==
Lascelles continued her research after leaving full-time academia. She would go on to publish three more books. She died on 10 December 1995 in Cromer, Norfolk, England; she was aged 95. She left many books to Somerville College Library.

== Honours ==
Lascelles was awarded the 1940 Rose Mary Crawshay Prize by the British Academy for her book, Jane Austen and Her Art (1939). In 1962, she was elected a Fellow of the British Academy (FBA), the United Kingdom's national academy for the humanities and social sciences. In 1982, she was once more awarded the Rose Mary Crawshay Prize, this time for her book, The Story-Teller Retrieves the Past (1980).

== Selected works ==
- Lascelles, Mary (1939). Jane Austen and Her Art. Oxford: Oxford University Press. 1995 reprint
- Lascelles, Mary (1953). Shakespeare's Measure for Measure. London: Athlone Press.
- Lascelles, Mary (1968). "Scott and the Art of Revision". In Mack, Maynard; Gregor, Ian (eds.). Imagined Worlds: essays on some English novels and novelists in honour of John Butt. London: Methuen. pp. 139–56.
- Lascelles, Mary, ed. (1971). The Works of Samuel Johnson, Vol 9: A Journey to the Western Island of Scotland. New Haven, CT: Yale University Press. ISBN 978-0300012514.
- Lascelles, Mary (1973). Notions and Facts: Collected Criticism and Research. Oxford: Clarendon Press. ISBN 978-0198120223.
- Lascelles, Mary (1980). The Story-Teller Retrieves the Past: Historical Fiction and Fictitious History in the Art of Scott, Stevenson, Kipling, and Some Others. Oxford: Clarendon Press. ISBN 978-0198128021.

Poetry

- Lascelles, Mary (1971). The Adversaries and Other Poems. Cambridge: Rampant Lions Press.
