= Mary Ethel Seaton =

British literary scholar

Mary Ethel Seaton (25 July 1887, Rangoon – 17 June 1974, Oxford), known as Ethel Seaton, was a British scholar of English literature, specialising in the late Middle Ages. She was a Fellow of the Royal Society of Literature, and twice winner of the Rose Mary Crawshay Prize (1921, 1952).

== Life ==
Mary Ethel Seaton was born in Rangoon, Burma, to Francis Lambert Seaton, a member of the East India Company, and Fanny Warner. She attended the Ladies' College, Guernsey, and Portsmouth High School before taking a scholarship at Girton College, Cambridge. She received firsts in the Medieval and Modern Languages Tripos in 1909 and 1910.

Seaton was a lecturer at Girton College from 1910 to 1916, after which she worked in the censorship office in London till 1918. She began her master's thesis at the University of London in 1920, on the topic of literary relations between England and Scandinavia in the 17th century. This work, titled A Study of the Relations between England and the Scandinavian Countries in the Seventeenth Century Based upon the Evidence of Acquaintance in English writers with Scandinavian Literatures and Myths was awarded the 1921 Rose Mary Crawshay Prize.

She became a Fellow of St Hugh's College, Oxford in 1925, and a University Lecturer in 1939.

In 1951, Seaton was awarded a Doctor of Letters. Seaton's edition of Abraham Fraunce's Arcadian Rhetorike won the Rose Mary Crawshay Prize for 1952.

After retirement, Seaton continued her research into fifteenth century English literature. She examined the connections between Chaucer, Wyatt and Richard Roos, and was particularly appreciated for her analysis of Roos' anagrams and the superlative reconstruction of life in the 15th century English court. Her contention that Roos, a "Lancastrian poet", was the writer of verses attributed to Chaucer (The Romaunt of the Rose) and Wyatt caused contention in scholarly circles.

Seaton died in Oxford in 1974. She bequeathed St Hugh's her estate, partly to endow the Fanny Seaton Schoolmistress Studentship. Her obituary in St. Hugh's College Chronicle described her as having "a quiet confidence in the truths of the mind and the imagination".

== Selected works ==
- Venus and Anchises and other poems by Phineas Fletcher. 1926.
- Literary Relations between England and Scandinavia in the Seventeenth Century. Clarendon. 1935.
- Abraham Fraunce's Arcadian Rhetorike. Blackwell. 1950.
- Sir Richard Roos, Lancastrian poet. 1961.

== Bibliography ==
- "Mary Ethel Seaton". St Hugh's College Chronicle (47). 1975.
- Petrina, Alessandra (2004). Cultural Politics in Fifteenth-Century England. Brill. ISBN 9789047404903.
- "Obituary: Miss Mary Ethel Seaton". The Times. 24 June 1974.
