= Vittoria Sanna =

- Born: May 11, 1905; Arezzo, Italy
- Died: April 25, 2003 (aged 97); Cagliari
- Citizenship: Italian
- Education: University of Naples
- Writing career
- Years active: 1947–1980
- Subject: English literature
- Notable work: Religio Medici of Thomas Browne
- Notable awards: Rose Mary Crawshay Prize (1961)

Vittoria Sanna (May 11, 1905 in Arezzo – April 25, 2003 in Cagliari) was an Italian scholar of English literature and a translator into Italian. The first woman to be made a full professor in Italy, she was the chair of the Foreign Languages and Literatures at the University of Cagliari. She is best known for her critical edition of the Religio Medici of Thomas Browne, which won the Rose Mary Crawshay Prize (1961), and for promoting English writers in Italy.

== Life ==
Vittoria Sanna was born in Arezzo in 1905. At the age of 17, she left for England and later went to France and Germany to work as a teacher. She graduated in Languages at the University of Naples, after which she joined the State Railways as an interpreter. She also taught at the Dettori classical high school in Cagliari.

In 1947, Vittoria Sanna started as a teacher of English language at the University of Cagliari, then became a lecturer in English literature. She was the first woman in Italy to attain full professorship, which she did in 1954. She was chair of Foreign Languages and Literatures at the university. Between 1967 and 1971, she was the dean of the Faculty of Education. She retired in 1973 but continued to be attached to the university till 1980.

With her deep analysis she succeeded in making several great writers of the English language appreciated and known in Italy, in particular, Virginia Woolf. She translated and analyzed the works of Ann Radcliffe, Henry James and Arnold Bennett. She studied the nature of English society through its literature in the late Victorian period in her treatise Orizzonti sociali inglesi nella prima metà dell'ottocento (1951). Her critical edition of the Religio Medici of Thomas Browne (1959) won the Rose Mary Crawshay Prize for 1961. Of significant importance were also her contributions on the exploration of the historical and social panorama informing English writers of prose in the seventeenth century (Prosatori Inglesi del seicento, 1963) and her studies on the genesis and influences of the Jamesian narrative, as well as on some aspects of Elizabethan theatre.

A volume titled Traduzioni e invenzioni esplorando l'ignoto in her honour, edited by Luisa Sanna and Roberta Zacchi, was published in 2000.

Sanna died in Cagliari in 2003.

== Selected works ==
- Orizzonti sociali inglesi nella prima metà dell'ottocento. 1951.
- Religio Medici di Thomas Browne. 1959.
- Prosatori Inglesi del seicento. 1963.
- Saggi di letteratura inglese e americana. 1977.

== Bibliography ==
- Sanna, Vittoria (1977). "Prefazione". Saggi di letteratura inglese e americana (in Italian). ISBN 9788884986412.
- "Festeggiata la decana della letteratura inglese Vittoria Sanna, una vita tra università e anglistica". La Nuova Sardegna (in Italian). June 6, 2000.
- "Vittoria Sanna, la prima docente di letteratura inglese in Italia". L'Unione Sarda (in Italian). April 8, 2017.
- Cogoni, Laura; Todde, Eleonora (February 8, 2021). "Vittoria Sanna". Historical Archive, University of Cagliari.
