= Madeleine Cazamian =

French scholar and translator

Madeleine Cazamian (née Clédat; June 18, 1884, Lyon – April 21, 1979, Paris) was a French scholar of English studies and a translator. A specialist in 19th-century English literature, she is known for her research on the English novel and ideas at the turn of the 19th and 20th centuries. She was a winner of the Rose Mary Crawshay Prize in 1924.

== Life ==
Madeleine Clédat was born in Lyon, the daughter of Léon Clédat (1851–1930). She obtained a doctorate from the University of Strasbourg, after which she taught at the Faculty of Arts, University of Lyon. Following her marriage to Louis Cazamian in 1908, the couple became faculty at the Sorbonne, teaching English.

Madeleine Cazamian was a feminist activist, and a president of the Association française des femmes diplômées de l’Université (French Association of Women Graduates). In the First World War, she ran a network to help refugees along with Louise Puech.

== Work ==
The first volume of Cazamian's magnum opus, Le Roman et les idées en Angleterre: L'influence de la science (1860-1890), published in 1923, was critically lauded. Studying the influence of scientific ideas on English novel, Cazamian explored the oeuvre of Charles Dickens, George Eliot, George Meredith and Samuel Butler, among others. Inasmuch as science, particularly the theory of evolution, permeated society to a great level, Cazamian had to explain the intellectual milieu underpinning English culture in the 19th century. The influence of religion on Eliot, the question of the emancipation of women on George Gissing, the problem of evil studied by Thomas Hardy, all these were coloured by scientific thought, she claimed.

The third volume in the series, Le Roman et les idées en Angleterre: Les Doctrines d'action et l'aventure (1880-1914), published in 1955, was more variably received. Cazamian explained that in a period of loss of traditional thought and the normative idea of reason was held incomplete, action and dynamism impelled the search for meaning and order. To illustrate the concept, she discussed Robert Louis Stevenson's voyages, the social activism of Galsworthy, the moral critiques of H. G. Wells, and the drive towards a spiritual discovery beyond realism among the Victorians. Centred on William James, the treatise defined his pragmatism as the main influence on Stevenson and Kipling. Overall, Cazamian's effort to situate and analyze the literature as an artefact of the time, seeking patterns rather than treating a novel entire as an abstract object of art, was appreciated. However, other critics pointed out the diffuse nature of her thesis, including far too many disparate authors under the rubric of action. Even the chapter-long treatments of some writers (such as Joseph Conrad) were deemed shallow. The idea of adventure was interesting, subsuming theosophy, pragmatism and spiritism, but inadequately glimpsed.

In 1969, she co-translated some of George Meredith's poems with her husband to critical acclaim.

== Selected works ==
- Le Roman et les idées en Angleterre: L'influence de la science (1860-1890). Librarie Istria. 1923.
- L'autre Amérique. H. Champion. 1931.
- Le Roman et les idées en Angleterre: L'anti-intellectualisme et l'esthétisme (1880-1900). Librarie Istria. 1935.
- Le Roman et les idées en Angleterre: Les Doctrines d'action et l'aventure (1880-1914). 1955.

=== Translations ===
- George Meredith (1969). Poèmes choisis. Translated by L. and M. Cazamian. Editions Montaigne.

== Awards ==
- Prix Montyon (1924)
- Rose Mary Crawshay Prize (1924)
- Prix Anaïs-Ségalas (1932)
- Prix Jules-Davaine (1937)
- Prix Paul-Teissonnière (1955)
