= Dorothy Hewlett =

Dorothy Hewlett (? in Kilburn, London – 9 January 1979 in Richmond, London) was an English scholar specialising in 19th century literature, a novelist and playwright. Known for her stewardship of the Keats-Shelley Memorial Bulletin, she was a winner of the Rose Mary Crawshay Prize (1938) and a Fellow of the Royal Society of Literature.

== Life ==
Dorothy Hewlett was born in Kilburn, London.

In 1923, Hewlett married Norman Kilgour, who would later be a frequent contributor to the Keats-Shelley Memorial Bulletin, which she edited for 27 years. She was a Fellow of the Royal Society of Literature.

In 1950, Hewlett was an advisor to the Hampstead Borough Council on the restoration of Keats House, which had been bought for the public in 1922, and had subsequently suffered damage from the Second World War and neglect.

Hewlett died in Richmond in 1979.

== Selected works ==
Dorothy Hewlett's one act play The Box premiered at the International One-Act Play Theatre in 1935. A macabre story of an old man intending to poison his young wife, this play had negative reviews. Her biographical play on John Keats, Bright Star, was presented by the Play Society in London in 1936, and was not well received. The Daily Telegraph's critic called it an anemic portrait of Keats, while a critic from The Times said it only hinted at the Fanny Brawne theme instead of exploring it. She presented another biographical play, this time on Oliver Cromwell, The Great Man, in 1939, not to much better reviews: The Times' critic said it was insufficiently revelatory of Cromwell's character or his struggles with kingship.

Hewlett's novels, however, were widely lauded. Victorian House (1939) was a family drama set in the period leading up to the Great Exhibition of 1851, and was praised by various critics: it would recall much pleasure to those who lived through the Victorian period, and its ambling descriptions of London were appreciated. A Shocking Bad Hat published in 1941, was a piece of crime fiction and followed from where the previous novel ended. It was called a delightful caper with an intricate plot and a fine literary quality, with well rendered characters.

Hewlett was also acclaimed for her biographies. Her 1937 work on John Keats Adonais won the Rose Mary Crawshay Prize of the British Academy (1938). It was called a sympathetic, well-balanced and beautifully-rounded work, and an admirable piece of work throughout, carefully matured and pleasingly written. She wrote what was considered the definitive biography of Elizabeth Barrett Browning, first published in the US in 1952, concentrating on Browning's great poetic abilities and showing her as a great poet in her own right.

=== Biography ===
- Adonais, A Life of John Keats. Bobbs-Merrill Company. 1937.
- Elizabeth Barrett Browning. Knopf. 1952.

=== Novel ===
- Victorian House. Hurst & Blackett. 1939.
- A Shocking Bad Hat. Hurst & Blackett. 1941.
- Flowing Tide. 1955.

== Bibliography ==
- "England & Wales Marriages, 1837-2005". FindMyPast.
- "Kingsway Theatre: Three One-Act Plays". The Times. 4 February 1935.
- "London Sees Keats Play". The New York Times. 17 February 1936.
- W., J. (10 April 1938). "The Spirit That Was Keats". The Daily Oklahoman.
- Hutchison, Percy (6 March 1938). "Adonais, A Life of John Keats by Dorothy Hewlett". The New York Times.
- "Book Notes". The New York Times. 23 July 1938.
- "Portfolio Playhouse: The Great Man". The Times. 16 February 1939.
- Swinnerton, Frank (24 September 1939). "New Novels". The Observer.
- Southron, Jane Spence (23 November 1941). "Yesterday's England". The New York Times Book Review.
- "Restoration of Keats House". The Times. 11 March 1950.
- Thompson, Ruth K. (5 October 1952). "Colorful, Entertaining Biography of Elizabeth Barrett Browning". The Courier-Journal. Louisville.
- "Deaths". The New York Times. 24 January 1979.
- "Obituary: Dorothy Hewlett". The Times. 30 January 1979.
- "In Memoriam". Keats-Shelley Journal. 28: 5. 1979. JSTOR 30212832.
