= Louis Cazamian =

French academic and literary critic

Louis François Cazamian
- Born: 2 April 1877; Saint-Denis, Île de la Réunion
- Died: 22 September 1965 (aged 88)
- Occupation: Academic
- Writing career
- Subject: English Literature

Louis François Cazamian (2 April 1877 – 22 September 1965) was a French academic and literary critic. He was the author of many books in both French and English dealing with English literature, including A History of English Literature (1927, with Émile Legouis), Le Roman Social en Angleterre (an early study of the social novel), and The Development of English Humor (1952). Other works include The Social Impact of Dickens's Novels, L'Humour de Shakespeare and Symbolisme et Poésie. Along with his wife, Madeleine Cazamian, he translated English poetry into French.

As professor of English literature at the University of Paris, he delivered three Rice Lectures in 1911: "The Unity of France", "The France of Today and Tomorrow" and "The Personality of France". He delivered the 1931 Andrew Lang Lecture, "Andrew Lang and the Maid of France". He received honorary degrees from Oxford, St Andrews, and Durham universities.

He was professor of modern English literature and civilization at the Sorbonne from 1925 to 1945. He supervised, among others, Raja Rao and Dragoș Protopopescu in their time at the Sorbonne. He is thanked in the preface to Ian Watt's The Rise of the Novel.
