= Ankhi Mukherjee =

Professor of English Literature

Ankhi Mukherjee FRSL FRHistS
- Born: Ankhi Mukherjee; Kolkata, India
- Occupations: Professor of English and World Literatures
- Awards: Rose Mary Crawshay Prize Robert S. Liebert Award

Academic background
- Education: Rutgers University (PhD)

Academic work
- Institutions: Oxford University
- Main interests: Victorian Literature Postcolonial Studies Intellectual History (Psychoanalysis)
- Website: ankhimukherjee.com

Ankhi Mukherjee FRSL FRHistS is a Professor of English and World Literatures at the University of Oxford and Fellow in English at Wadham College, Oxford. She specialises in Victorian literature and culture, critical theory, postcolonial studies, world literature, and intellectual history, in particular the history of psychology and psychoanalysis.

== Career ==
After studying in India and the US, Ankhi Mukherjee received a doctor of philosophy degree (PhD) from Rutgers University in the United States. She was visiting lecturer at Royal Holloway College in London between 2001 and 2002 and, in the next academic year, took up a post at Wadham College, Oxford, as a Lecturer in English. From 2003 to 2006, she held a British Academy Postdoctoral Fellowship, and she started an Associate Professorship in the English Faculty at Oxford (with a Fellowship at Wadham College) in 2006. She was a visiting fellow at the Humanities Research Centre at the Australian National University in 2014 and John Hinkley (Visiting) Professor at Johns Hopkins University in 2019. In 2015, she became Professor of English and World Literatures at the University of Oxford.

Mukherjee sits on the editorial boards of several leading peer-reviewed journals, including The Cambridge Journal of Postcolonial Literary Inquiry, Contemporary Literature, English Literary History (ELH), Paragraph, and Literature, Critique, and Empire Today. She is also on the advisory boards of EXPeditions and Harlem Family Services, a non-profit organisation offering comprehensive mental health services to Harlem and neighbouring communities.

== Awards and recognition ==
Mukherjee's research has been supported by the British Academy, the Arts and Humanities Research Council (UK), the Wellcome Trust, and the John Fell Fund (Oxford). Her second book, What Is a Classic?, won the Rose Mary Crawshay Prize from the British Academy in 2015, and her third book, Unseen City, won the Robert S. Liebert Award, conferred jointly by the Columbia University Center for Psychoanalytic Training and Research and the Association for Psychoanalytic Medicine (APM) in recognition of outstanding scholarship in the field of applied psychoanalysis. Unseen City was also shortlisted for the 2024 European Society for the Study of English (ESSE) Book Award.

She was elected a Fellow of the Royal Society of Literature (FRSL) and of the Royal Historical Society in 2026.

== Works ==
Mukherjee's publications reflect her varied research interests, including Victorian melodrama, postcolonial and world literature, psychoanalysis in an international frame, and experiments in dreaming in nineteenth-century English and Anglophone literatures. She has published three monographs:

- Aesthetic Hysteria: The Great Neurosis in Victorian Melodrama and Contemporary Fiction (Routledge, 2007)
- What Is a Classic? Postcolonial Rewriting and Invention of the Canon (Stanford University Press, 2013)
- Unseen City: The Psychic Lives of the Urban Poor (Cambridge University Press, 2022)

She has also edited or co-edited three scholarly collections:

- A Concise Companion to Psychoanalysis, Literature, and Culture (Wiley-Blackwell, 2014) with Laura Marcus
- After Lacan: Literature, Theory and Psychoanalysis in the Twenty-First Century (Cambridge University Press, 2018)
- Decolonizing the English Literary Curriculum (Cambridge University Press, 2023) in collaboration with Ato Quayson (Stanford University).

A selection of Mukherjee's other articles and publications include:

- “Psychoanalysis of the Excommunicated,” differences: A Journal of Feminist Cultural Studies 33, 2-3 (2022)
- "Aesthetic Criticism and the Postcolonial," The Question of the Aesthetic, ed. George Levine (Oxford UP, 2022)
- "On Antigone's Suffering," Special Issue "On Suffering," The Cambridge Journal of Postcolonial Literary Inquiry 8, 2 (April 2021)
- "To Write Like a Dream: Nineteenth-Century Legacies," Special Issue "Theories of the Nineteenth Century," ed. Anna Kornbluh and Zach Samalin, Criticism: A Quarterly for Literature and the Arts 61, 4 (Fall 2019)
- "Affective Form," Affect and Literature, ed. Alex Houen (Cambridge UP, 2019)
- "Nautical Melodrama," The Cambridge Companion to English Melodrama, ed. Carolyn Williams (Cambridge UP, 2018)
- "Creole Modernisms," Affirmations: of the Modern 2, 1 (2015)
- "Primetime Psychoanalysis", A Concise Companion to Psychoanalysis, Literature, and Culture, ed. Laura Marcus and Ankhi Mukherjee (Wiley-Blackwell, 2014)
- "The Rushdie Canon," Salman Rushdie: Contemporary Critical Perspectives, ed. Robert Eaglestone and Martin McQuillan (Bloomsbury, 2012)
- "Postcolonial Responses to the Western Canon," The Cambridge History of Postcolonial Literature, ed. Ato Quayson (Cambridge UP, 2011)
- "‘This Traffic of Influence’: Derrida and Spivak," Special Issue "Gayatri Spivak: Postcolonial and Other Pedagogies," Parallax 60 (Summer 2011)
- "‘What is a Classic?’: International Literary Criticism and the Classic Question," Special Issue "Literary Criticism for the Twenty-First Century," ed. Cathy Caruth and Jonathan Culler, PMLA (October 2010)
- "‘Yes, sir, I was the one who got away’: Postcolonial Emergence and the Question of Global English," Études Anglaises 3 (2009)
- "The Death of the Novel and Two Postcolonial Writers," Special Issue "Influence," ed. Andrew Elfenbein, Modern Language Quarterly, 69, 4 (December 2008)
- "Fissured Skin, Inner Ear Radio, and a Telepathic Nose: The Senses as Media in Salman Rushdie’s Midnight’s Children," Paragraph 29, 6 (November 2006)
- "Buried Alive: The Gothic Carceral in V. S. Naipaul’s Fiction," Special Issue "V.S. Naipaul," ed. Pradyumna Chauhan, South Asian Review (Fall 2005)
- "Missed Encounters: Repetition, Rewriting, and Contemporary Returns to Charles Dickens’s Great Expectations," Contemporary Literature 46, 1 (Spring 2005)
- "Stammering to Story: Neurosis and Narration in Pat Barker’s Regeneration," Critique: Studies in Contemporary Fiction 43 (Fall 2001)
