= Enid Welsford =

- Born: Enid Elder Hancock Welsford; 26 February 1892; Harrow on the Hill, England
- Died: 4 December 1981 (aged 89); Cambridge, England
- Resting place: Harrow
- Education: University College, London; Newnham College, Cambridge
- Writing career
- Language: English
- Notable works: The Fool: his Social and Literary History (1935)
- Notable awards: Rose Mary Crawshay Prize (1928, 1967)

Enid Elder Hancock Welsford (26 February 1892, Harrow on the Hill – 4 December 1981, Cambridge) was an English literary scholar, a Fellow of Newnham College, Cambridge, and twice winner of the Rose Mary Crawshay Prize – in 1928 and 1967. She is best known for her book The Fool: his Social and Literary History, published in 1935.

== Life ==
Enid Elder Hancock Welsford was born in 1892 to Mildred L. Hancock, an artist, and Joseph W. W. Welsford, a teacher at Harrow School. She attended Conamur School in Kent, then took her undergraduate degree at University College, London in 1911. In 1914, she obtained a first-class degree with a distinction in Old English from Newnham College, Cambridge, where she was to remain for the rest of her career.

Her book of poems The Seagulls and other poems, published in 1904, was appreciated as the work of a prodigy.

Welsford was a practising Christian, a member of the Anglican Franciscans, and a member of the interdenominational Conference of University Teachers. Keen to promote and support women scholars, she co-founded and presided over the University Women's Research Club.

After a stroke in 1978, Welsford struggled for several years. She died at her home in Cambridge, on 4 December 1981.

== Career ==
Enid Welsford obtained a Marion Kennedy studentship at Newnham with which she studied comparative literature in Old English under H. M. Chadwick. Her researches continued till 1918, after which she switched to literature from later periods. She had also started teaching at Newnham College in 1916. She became a Fellow of the college in 1921 and a university lecturer in 1928, a position she kept till 1959. She also was a director of studies in archaeology and anthropology (1939–1952), as well as of moral sciences (1941–1952).

Welsford's first book, The Court Masque appeared in 1927, and was well-received, winning the Rose Mary Crawshay Prize the following year. She examined the progress of the masque and the antimasque in the history of English poetry, showing how the catholic Tudor court absorbed European influences, whose admixture formed the English masque. By the time of Ben Jonson, the chaos of the grotesques in the antimasques was circumscribed and in opposition to the main action of the court progress.

In 1935, Welsford's most celebrated book The Fool: his Social and Literary History appeared, subsequently translated into several languages. The fool or jester started in the East, she suggested, arriving in ancient Greece as joker before firmly ensconcing himself in Roman drama as a figure of fun. Though it was unclear how a mentally deficient person became an entertainer, especially during much of history when handicaps, both mental and physical, were derided, by the Middle Ages, a court jester was often well-treated and well-fed, and totemised as a mascot. The fool may rarely have become a high officer, but in Elizabethan and Stuart times, he was considered an abstraction, a generalised figure of chaos. The English fool, moreover, did not evolve in isolation: the Fool in Shakespeare's King Lear bears a strong resemblance to the medieval French sot. Among other topics, she also traced the history of the English pantomime in relation to the Harlequin in the early eighteenth century, from its arrival with the Alard brothers at Drury Lane to the bigger extravaganzas that became the norm in competition with the Lincoln's Inn theatre. The Harlequin was an aerial demon, originally, leading a nocturnal procession called the Wild Hunt; over time, this cavalcade of forlorn souls lost its frightening quality and they became a set of jocose characters. The book was considered a definitive treatise on the subject, celebrated for its depth of insight.

After retirement, Welsford continued her researches. Her Salisbury Plain, a Study in the Development of Wordsworth's Mind and Art, published in 1966, won the Rose Mary Crayshaw Prize the next year.

== Honours ==
Welsford twice received the Rose Mary Crawshay Prize of the British Academy. In 1979, The Fool and the Trickster: Studies in Honour of Enid Welsford, a festschrift in her name was published.

== Selected works ==
- Enid Welsford (1927). The Court Masque.
- Enid Welsford (1935). The Fool: his Social and Literary History.
- Enid Welsford (1966). Salisbury Plain, a Study in the Development of Wordsworth's Mind and Art.
- Edmond Spenser (1967). Enid Welsford (ed.). Fowre Hymnes, Epithalamion.

== Bibliography ==
- Crispin, Philip (2014). "Aimé Césaire's Caribbean Crucible: La Tragédie Du Roi Christophe" (PDF). Présence Africaine. 189 (189): 353–366. doi:10.3917/presa.189.0353. JSTOR 43617346.
- de Kay, Charles (1 October 1904). "Two Little Prodigies". The New York Times.
- Estermann, Barbara (2014). "Shelley's Antimasques of Life: Re-visioning 'The Triumph.'". ELH. 81 (4): 1193–1224. doi:10.1353/elh.2014.0048. JSTOR 24477775. S2CID 170303952.
- Hutchison, Percy (19 January 1936). "That Privileged Person, the Fool". The New York Times.
- Lovejoy, Bess (15 October 2016). "What Do The Scary Clows Want?". The New York Times.
- "Welsford, Enid Elder Hancock". Oxford Dictionary of National Biography (online ed.). Oxford University Press. doi:10.1093/ref:odnb/62393. (Subscription, Wikipedia Library access or UK public library membership required.)
- "The British Academy: Sir T. Arnold to deliver Schweich lectures". The Times. 30 October 1928.
- "Harlequin and the Pantomime". The Times. 17 December 1951.
- "British Academy Fellows". The Times. 13 July 1967.
- "Miss E. E. H. Welsford, Obituary". The Times. 10 December 1981.
