= Barbara Rooke =

Barbara Elizabeth Rooke (1917–1978) was a Canadian scholar of English literature, a specialist in the works of Coleridge. A professor of English at the Trent University in Canada, she won the British Academy's Rose Mary Crawshay Prize in 1970.

== Life ==
Rooke attended the Queen's University, Kingston, Ontario, graduating with honours in 1940 and winning the Wilhelmina Gordon Foundation scholarship for English. Following her master's degree the following year, she was in the Women's Division of the Royal Canadian Air Force until the end of the Second World War. She was an assistant section officer based in Mossbank, Saskatchewan in charge of new recruits.

Rooke obtained a Royal Society of Canada Fellowship to study abroad in 1948–1949. She obtained a doctorate from the University of London.

In 1948, Rooke and Kathleen Coburn undertook a research trip to Scotland, following Coleridge and Wordsworth's 1803 journey. Coburn related how their ration cards were often not accepted to obtain eggs and meat. Rooke's doctoral research was on Coleridge, which she continued in her later academic life. This led to the two-volume edition of The Friend that she published in 1969 as part of the Bollingen series of Coleridge's collected works (edited by Kathleen Coburn), for which she won the Rose Mary Crawshay Prize. The work was lauded for its beauty and lucidity.

In 1951, Rooke was a member of the department of English at the Victoria College, University of Toronto. She was a lecturer of English at the University College of the West Indies in Jamaica. Between 1967 and 1979, she was a professor of English literature at Trent University in Canada.

== Recognition ==
A Barbara Rooke Fellowship for post-doctoral research was established by Trent University, allowing scholars to study the English Romantic period. The Rooke Memorial Lectures are held annually since 1998 at the Trent University to honour Barbara Rooke. The Barbara Rooke Travel Prize has been offered since 2013 to a high-achieving graduate of the university's English department to travel to a significant literary heritage site.
