= Jen Robertson =

Jennie, Jenny, or Jennifer Robertson may refer to:

== People ==
- Jennifer Robertson (born 1971), Canadian actress, also known as Jenn
- Jennie Smillie Robertson (1878-1981), Canadian physician
- Jennifer Robertson (athlete) in 1989 IAAF World Cross Country Championships – Junior women's race
- Jennifer Robertson (Quadriga), heir to Quadriga cryptocurrency fund
- Jennifer Ellen Robertson on List of Guggenheim Fellowships awarded in 2011

== Fictional characters ==
- Jennifer Robertson, character in A Smile Like Yours
- Jennifer Robertson, character in The Seán Cullen Show
- Jenny Robertson, character in Jenny Robertson, Your Friend is not Coming, story in Free Love and Other Stories
- Jenny Robertson, character in Attack of the Herbals

== See also ==
- Jennifer Roberson (born 1953), American author
- Jean Robertson (disambiguation)
