= Annabelle Terhune =

Annabelle Burdick Terhune (c. 1904, Pittsburgh – June 24, 1986, Syracuse, New York) was an American journalist, editor and scholar, specialising in the life of Edward FitzGerald. She won the British Academy's Rose Mary Crawshay Prize in 1982.

== Life ==
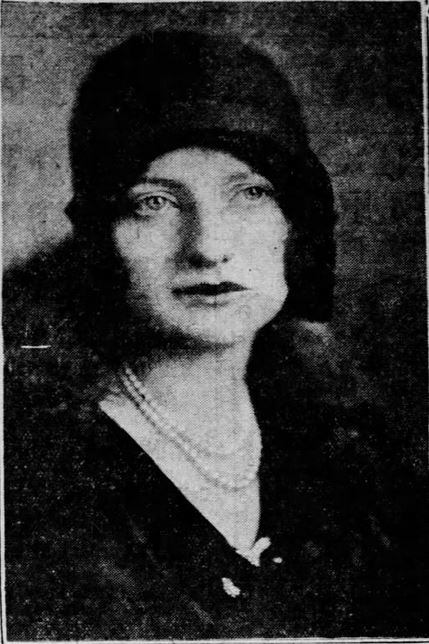
Annabelle Burdick Terhune on her wedding day, August 1929

Annabelle Burdick was born in Pittsburgh, Pennsylvania. She studied at the Westinghouse High School, and was valedictorian of her class in 1920. She graduated from the University of Michigan at Ann Arbor, where she was tennis champion, and obtained a master's degree from Columbia University.

Burdick taught journalism at the University of Pittsburgh. She was also a fashion correspondent for The Display World magazine.

In 1929, she married Alfred McKinley Terhune (1899–1975), a scholar. They moved to Syracuse, New York, where Alfred Terhune became a professor of English at the Syracuse University.

With her husband, Burdick began the monumental task of collecting and collating Edward FitzGerald's correspondence, transcribing, annotating and arranging them in chronological order. The result was four volumes, published in 1980, after Alfred Terhune's death. The work was lauded for thoroughness and considered invaluable not only for FitzGerald studies, but also for scholars of the Victorian society and history. Burdick won the Rose Mary Crawshay Prize in 1982 for the work.

Annabelle Burdick died June 24, 1986, at the age of 82.

== Selected works ==
- Terhune, Alfred; Terhune, Annabelle Burdick, eds. (1980). The Letters of Edward FitzGerald, 1830–1850. Vol. I. Princeton University.
- Terhune, Alfred; Terhune, Annabelle Burdick, eds. (1980). The Letters of Edward FitzGerald, 1851–1866. Vol. II. Princeton University.
- Terhune, Alfred; Terhune, Annabelle Burdick, eds. (1980). The Letters of Edward FitzGerald, 1867–1876. Vol. III. Princeton University.
- Terhune, Alfred; Terhune, Annabelle Burdick, eds. (1980). The Letters of Edward FitzGerald, 1877–1883. Vol. IV. Princeton University.
