= Giovanna Foà =

Italian scholar and translator

Giovanna Foà (May 27, 1910, Milan – December 1997, Milan) was an Italian scholar and translator, and a Professor of English at the Bocconi University, Milan. She was a winner of the British Academy's Rose Mary Crawshay Prize (1934) for her work Lord Byron, Poeta e Carbonaro.

== Life ==
Giovanna Foà was born in Milan to Dino Foà and Ester Rouf, one of four children. She graduated in Literature at the University of Milan in 1933, followed by a diploma in English in 1934. Her thesis on Italian influences on Byron and his own association with the conspirators Carbonari won the Rose Mary Crawshay Prize (1934), and was published the following year.

As a Jew, she was expelled from teaching at the Liceo Scientifico in Pisa, whereupon she went into exile in France and then to England, where she remained throughout the Second World War. From 1939-40 to 1945 she was an announcer on Radio London. She maintained contact with English women's associations, especially the British Federation of University Women. Foà's brother Alberto was murdered by the Nazis at Auschwitz. In 1946 she returned to Italy as a lecturer at Bocconi University's Faculty of Languages, where she worked for the next 25 years. In 1947, she married Alfredo Cantoni (1901–1981).

Foà wrote on Elizabeth Barrett Browning's interests in Italian affairs in her 1954 work Elizabeth Barrett Browning and Italy.

Foà died in December 1997 at Milan.

== Selected works ==
- Lord Byron, Poeta e Carbonaro (in Italian). Florence: La Nuova Italia. 1935.
- Matalon, Stella (1952). The Brera gallery in Milan. Translated by Foà, Giovanna. Milan: Garzanti.
- Elizabeth Barrett Browning and Italy. 1954.
- Foà, Giovanna. Outlines of English History. La Goliardica.
