= Lyndsey Stonebridge =

English scholar

Lyndsey Stonebridge FBA FEA (born February 1965) is an English scholar and professor of humanities and human rights at the University of Birmingham. Her work relates to refugee studies, human rights, and the effects of violence on the mind in the 20th and 21st centuries. She is also a regular radio and media commentator, writing for publications such as The New Statesman, Prospect Magazine, and New Humanist.

== Career ==
Lyndsey Stonebridge was born in Bromley, Kent. She earned her BA at the Polytechnic of North London, an MA in critical theory from the University of Sussex, and her PhD at the University of London.

She was a professor of modern literature and history at the University of East Anglia, where she founded the Arts and Humanities Graduate School. Currently, she is a professor of humanities and human rights at the University of Birmingham, where she also teaches in the Law School.

She is also co-editor of Oxford University Press's Mid-Century Series, and has held visiting positions at Cornell University and the University of Sydney.

She was elected a fellow of the English Association in 2017, and a member of the Academia Europaea in 2019. Her books, The Judicial Imagination: Writing after Nuremberg (2011) and Placeless People: Writing, Rights, and Refugees (2018) have won the British Academy's Rose Mary Crawshay Prize, and Modernist Studies Association Best Book Prize, respectively. She was elected a Fellow of the British Academy in 2023.

Her book, We Are Free to Change the World, was shortlisted for the 2024 Orwell Prize for Political Writing.

== Views on human rights and refugees ==
Stonebridge believes that novels and poetry "embody and express" our conceptions of human rights and humanity as time moves on. Literary writing, she says, can be a political act that "gives form and meaning" to human rights. Accordingly, much of her work is rooted in the field of literary criticism, whereby she surveys different sources of literature, such as those by Franz Kafka, George Orwell, and Simone Weil, to explore modern statelessness and the connection between citizenship and human rights. Her analysis is usually done through the framework of Hannah Arendt's critical theory, as her work is central to Stonebridge's thought.

In her book, Placeless People: Writing, Rights, and Refugees, Stonebridge describes a history of modern statelessness, which she calls an evil that, unlike genocide, which also emerged as a term in the twentieth century, has "yet to take root in our cultural memory of modern trauma". She elaborates on Arendt's argument that human rights can never truly be "human" as long as they are tied to nation states, citizenship, and sovereignty. This is most obvious in the world's treatment of refugees. As people who "opened up a space…for thinking and being between nation states", refugees are the ones for whom the principles of the Universal Declaration of Human Rights (UDHR) should most clearly apply. However, their effective (albeit, often unofficial) statelessness leaves them in a state of limbo, without what Arendt describes as a "right to have rights". Stonebridge therefore explicitly rejects apolitical, humanitarian solutions to human rights and refugees, arguing that these approaches mask the nature of refugees as a politically constructed concept. The modern category of refugees, she argues, is a direct result of the fact that the UDHR does not exactly enshrine "human" rights, but rather "citizen’s" rights.

For example, Stonebridge cites the enforcement (or lack thereof) of United Nations General Assembly Resolution 194 as a failure of the UN's commitment to self determination and universal Human Rights after the creation of Israel, which Arendt criticized as unable to solve the problem of refugees, as like any nation-state, it is bound to simply create new refugees to replace the old.

According to Stonebridge, Arendt taught Franz Kafka's The Castle at some of her lectures to explain this idea. The protagonist, K, can be viewed as a refugee, migrant, or "Jew stranger" lured by false promises (such as universal human rights) that are actually irreconcilable with the functioning of the castle's ( or nation's) bureaucracy.

By endorsing this idea, Stonebridge advocates for a kind of internationalism, where rights are divorced from national sovereignty. However, she is critical of "blindly humanistic" romanticized narratives of internationalism or exile, framed as an intellectual choice and path to freedom. For example, she criticizes Virginia Woolf's famous proclamation that "As a woman I have no country. As a woman I want no country. As a woman, my country is the whole world." For Stonebridge, this announcement would seem "whimsical" to those for whom the "brutal politics" of exile and displacement was a means of survival from persecution.

== Selected publications ==
=== Authored ===
- The Destructive Element: British Psychoanalysis and Modernism. Macmillan, Basingstoke, 1998.
- The Writing of Anxiety: Imagining Wartime in 1940s British Culture. Palgrave, Basingstoke, 2007.
- The Judicial Imagination: Writing After Nuremberg. Edinburgh University Press, Edinburgh, 2011.
- Placeless People: Writing, Rights and Refugees. Oxford University Press, Oxford, 2018. ISBN 978-0-19-879700-5
- Writing and Righting Oxford University Press, 2021
- We Are Free To Change The World Jonathan Cape (2024) (Biography of Hannah Arendt)

=== Edited ===
- Reading Melanie Klein. Routledge, London and New York, 1998. (edited with John Phillips)
- British Fiction after Modernism: The Novel at Mid-Century. Palgrave, Basingstoke, 2007. (edited with Marina Mackay)
