= Mary Paton Ramsay =

- Born: 25 October 1885; Headington, Oxfordshire, England
- Died: 5 July 1967 (aged 81); Edinburgh, Scotland
- Education: University of Aberdeen
- Occupation: Academic
- Known for: Les Doctrines Medievales Chez Donne (1917)
- Parent: Sir William Ramsay

Mary Paton Ramsay (25 October 1885 – 5 July 1967) was a Scottish academic. In 1919, she was the winner of the Rose Mary Crawshay Prize for her book Les Doctrines Medievales Chez Donne, which argued for the influence of medieval mysticism on the poetry of John Donne.

== Early life ==
Mary Ramsay was born in Headington, Oxfordshire, on 25 October 1885, the daughter of Sir William Ramsay.

She was one of the first female graduates from the University of Aberdeen where she read English (MA, 1908). She was elected to a Carnegie fellowship in 1913 and studied the origins of English metaphysical poetry under professor H. J. C. Grierson. She completed her doctorate on John Donne under professor François Picavet of the University of Paris, an authority on scholasticism in Europe who had also written about Donne.

During the First World War, she did clerical work, spent two years working with munitions (TNT) in Edinburgh 1915–1917, and worked as an administrator in France for the Queen Mary's Army Auxiliary Corps, 1917–1919.

== Career ==
In 1919, Ramsay was a lecturer in history and sociology at the American College for Women at Constantinople when she won the Rose Mary Crawshay Prize for her book Les Doctrines Medievales Chez Donne (French), which was based on her doctoral thesis. She argued in the book for the influence of medieval mysticism on Donne's work, although not of an extreme kind; Michael Martin sees this view as part of a trend in early twentieth-century literary criticism that derives from Evelyn Underhill's book Mysticism (1911). Ramsay's thesis was not universally accepted and several contemporary and later scholars have attempted to rebut it, including Mario Praz, T.S. Eliot, and George Williamson (1898–1968).

Ramsay's later works were on Scottish topics, including a discussion of John Calvin's attitude to art as it relates to Scotland and works on Scottish patriotism and song.

== Selected publications ==
- Les Doctrines Medievales Chez Donne, le poète métaphysicien de l'Angleterre (1573–1631). Humphrey Milford, London, 1917. (2nd, Oxford University Press, 1924)
- Calvin and Art, Considered in Relation to Scotland. Moray Press, Edinburgh & London, 1938.
- The Freedom of the Scots from Early Times Till its Eclipse in 1707: Displayed in Statements of our Forefathers Who Loved and Served Scotland. Edinburgh, 1945.
- Popular Variants of Auld Scots Sangs. Kilmarnock, 1946. (Editor)
