= The Ladies' College, Guernsey =

The Ladies' College

Location
- Les Gravees; Saint Peter Port, GY1 1RW; Guernsey; 49.457°N 2.549°W

Information
- Type: Private day school
- Motto: French: Fais ce que dois advienne que pourra (Do what is right come what may)
- Religious affiliation: Non-denominational Christian
- Established: 1872; 154 years ago
- Local authority: Guernsey Offshore Establishments
- Department for Education URN: 132526 Tables
- Principal: Daniele Harford-Fox
- Gender: Girls
- Age range: 11–18
- Enrolment: 395 (2016)
- Houses: Brock; Carey; Durand; de Sausmarez
- Colours: Green and navy
- Publication: Ilex
- School fees: £4,670 per term (2023/2024)
- Affiliation: Girls' Schools Association
- Website: www.ladiescollege.com

The Ladies' College is an independent day school for girls in Saint Peter Port, Guernsey. The school was founded on 10 October 1872 in order to provide academic education to girls on the island and was modelled after Cheltenham Ladies' College. As a member of the Girls' Schools Association (GSA), it is a public school in the British sense of the term.

The school has around 400 girls aged 11 to 18, and provides a coeducational sixth form in partnership with the nearby Elizabeth College. An associated preparatory school, Melrose, was opened in 1949 on the same site as the school. As a selective school, prospective pupils must pass an entrance exam to be offered a place, although the school accepts pupils from a wide ability range. The school charges £4,670 per term, with three terms per academic year, as of 2023/2024.

== History ==
The school was founded on 10 October 1872, with the aim of providing acamedic education to girls on the island. The school was established in order to emulate Cheltenham Ladies' College, by the two joint-secretaries of the Guernsey Ladies' Educational Guild who issued two hundred shares of five pounds each; fittingly, the school's first principal was a former member of staff at Cheltenham College. By the end of the school's first academic year the number of pupils reached 70.

Ahead of the Second World War, 1939 saw a large increase in enrollment at the school as many parents sent their children to the island for their safety, with many believing the Channel Islands to be the safest place in the British Isles. However, following the occupation of the Channel Islands by German forces in June 1940, an evacuation scheme was quickly assembled and 100 pupils, accompanied by school staff, were evacuated to England before eventually settling in Denbigh, Wales, following an invitation from the headmistress of the local Howell's School who offered to receive the school.

In 1949, following the school's return to the island, Melrose, a listed Georgian building adjacent to the school site was acquired and converted into a preparatory school. Following damage to the school building following a fire in 1962, the school was formally taken over in 1963 by the States of Guernsey, who approved the development of a new school building on the Grange. The foundation stone for the building was laid by Queen Elizabeth The Queen Mother, who declared, "the modern woman needs to have the highest education available to her if she is to take her place in the modern world" and wished the school a successful future.

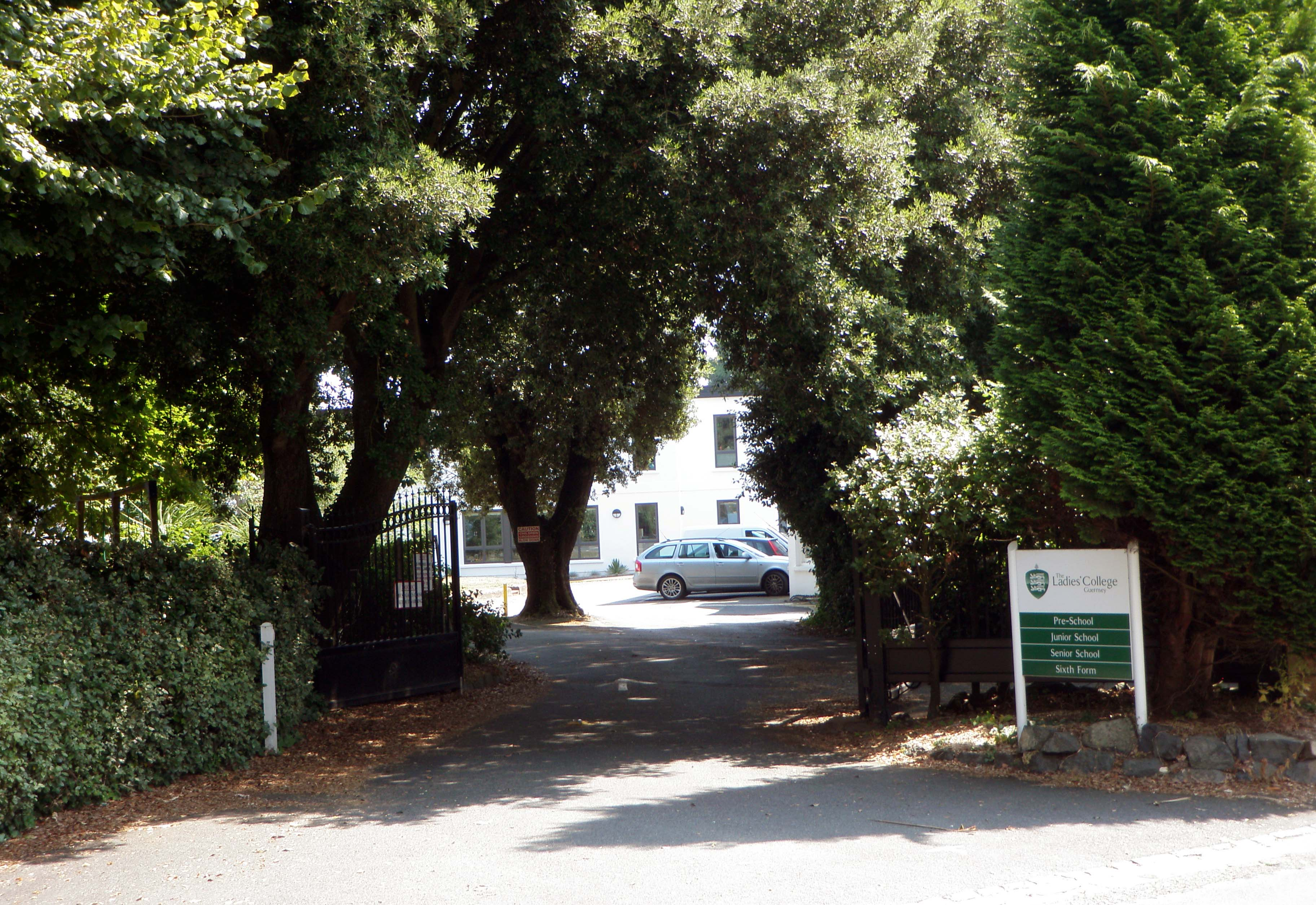
The entrance to The Ladies' College site from the Grange

== School structure ==
The school uses its own nomenclature in naming its year groups, different to that of the English National Curriculum. The school refers to what would commonly be named years 7 to 13 in English education as follows: remove, lower and upper 4, lower and upper 5, and lower and upper sixth.

== Governance ==
Governance is delivered by a board of six members appointed by the States of Deliberation, one of whom must be a sitting member of the States. A 2016 report by the Independent Schools Inspectorate (ISI) described the governance as "excellent", noting that "[g]overnors have an excellent insight into the working of the school, and provide an effective blend of support and challenge to the leadership".

The school operates in a sixth form partnership group with Elizabeth College, and is also a member of the Three Colleges Group along with Elizabeth College and Blanchelande to ensure unity between Guernsey's three independent schools.

The school is a member of the Girls' Schools Association (GSA) and is therefore considered a public school in the British sense of the term.

== Admissions ==
The school has grant-aided status, meaning around a third of places at the school are allocated by the States of Guernsey, based on the eleven-plus assessment. As of 2016, 395 girls are enrolled at the school, 83 of those being in the sixth form, with most coming from white skilled and professional families. In 2016, two-thirds of pupils were Guernsey-born and the remainder were of UK origin, with a small portion being from overseas.

Girls can proceed directly from Melrose (the associated preparatory school) or if coming from another school must sit the school's own entrance examination. Similar to Elizabeth College and Blanchelande, the school accepts pupils with a wide ability range, revealing in 2017 that only three pupils in total had been denied entry to all three Colleges in the last two years out of the 375 pupils that sat entrance assessments.

As of 2023/2024, the school charges £4,670 per term with three terms per academic year.

== Curriculum ==
Students in upper 5 are entered for a combination of GCSE and IGCSE examinations. In the sixth form, some teaching is shared with Elizabeth College, and pupils are entered for A-level examinations.

== Alumnae ==
Alumnae of the school are known as 'Old Girls' and are eligible to join the Ladies' College Guild, formed in 1905 as an association for former pupils. The school has educated the following notable alumnae:

- Jayne Ozanne, prominent evangelical Anglican and gay-equality campaigner
- Mary Eily de Putron, stained glass artist and archaeologist
- Marie Randall, politician and Guernsey's first female deputy
- Mary Ethel Seaton, scholar of English literature
- Violetta Thurstan, nurse, weaver, administrator and author
