= J. M. S. Tompkins =

British scholar of English literature (1897–1986)

Joyce M. S. Tompkins
- Joyce Tompkins, circa 1957
- Born: 3 November 1897; London, England
- Died: 27 December 1986 (aged 89); London, England
- Citizenship: British
- Education: Bedford College, London
- Writing career
- Subject: English literature
- Notable work: The Art of Rudyard Kipling
- Notable awards: Rose Mary Crawshay Prize (1923)

Joyce Marjorie Sanxter Tompkins (3 November 1897, London – 27 December 1986, London) was a British scholar of English literature, a specialist in Kipling. She was a winner of the Rose Mary Crawshay Prize (1923).

== Life ==
Joyce Marjorie Sanxter Tompkins was born in London in 1897. Her father, Albert James Tompkins, was a classics teacher.

She attended the German Day School and read English at Bedford College, London. She won the George Smith studentship in 1918, allowing her to obtain a master's degree from the University of London. She then worked as a teaching assistant in the English department at Bedford College.

She won the Rose Mary Crawshay Prize for 1923 with her Study of the Work of Mrs Radcliffe. In 1933, she was awarded a D.Litt. and the following year, she started as an assistant lecturer at the Royal Holloway College. In 1948 she was made reader; twice she served as vice-principal of the college. She retired in 1965.

Tompkins was a visiting professor at Dalhousie University, Nova Scotia, between 1967 and 1969, where she promoted its Stewart Collection of Kipling documents among Canadian scholars.

Tompkins' The Polite Marriage and Other Eighteenth Century Essays (1938) was a well-received treatise on minor novelists of the late eighteenth century. Her works on Kipling (The Art of Rudyard Kipling, 1959), Elizabeth Barrett Browning (Fawcett Lecture on 'Aurora Leigh', 1961) and William Morris (1987) were lauded for their innovation, keen interpretations, close analysis, and social perspective.

In later life, she suffered from loss of eyesight. She died in 1986.

== Selected works ==
- The Popular Novel in England, 1770–1800. 1932.
- The Polite Marriage: Eighteenth Century Essays. 1938.
- The Art of Rudyard Kipling. 1959.
- Tompkins, Joyce Marjorie Sanxter (1980). Ann Radcliffe and Her Influence on Later Writers. ISBN 9780405126819.
- An Approach to the Poetry of William Morris. 1987.

== Bibliography ==
- "George Smith Studentship". University of London: The Historical Record (1836–1926).
- "British Academy Awards". The Times. 2 February 1924.
- "Dr J. M. S. Tompkins". The Times. 16 January 1987.
- Varma, D. P. (1987). "Joyce Tompkins: A Tribute". The Kipling Journal. 61 (241).
