= Émile Legouis =

French scholar of English literature and translator

Signature
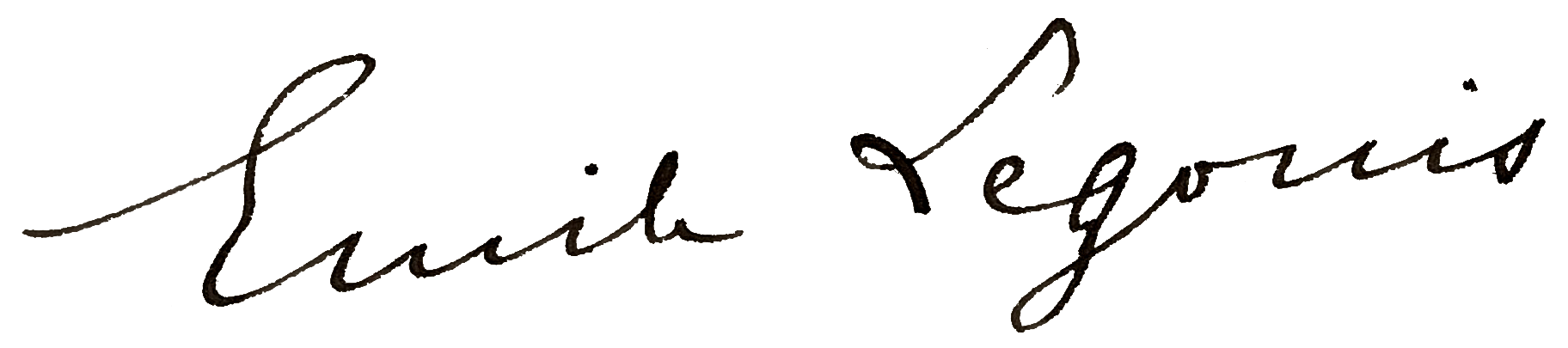

Émile Hyacinthe Legouis (31 October 1861 – 10 October 1937) was a French scholar of English literature and translator.

== Life ==
Son of a haberdasher, member of a family of five children, he began his career teaching one year at the college in Avranches. He became a student at the École pratique des hautes études in 1883, he subsequently received first at the agrégation of English in 1885. He was then appointed lecturer in English language and literature at the University of Lyon. Between 1904 and 1932, he taught English language and literature at the Sorbonne, first as a lecturer in 1904, then as a professor in 1906 and he obtained the chair in 1919. In 1920, he became deputy dean (assesseur du doyen).

Émile Legouis was appointed a Knight of the Legion of Honor in 1912. Among his students were Caroline Spurgeon (1869–1942) and René Huchon (1872–1940).

== Works ==
Legouis is considered one of the most significant French scholars of English, the founder of a French school of English studies and co-author, with Louis Cazamian (1877–1965), of a Histoire de la Littérature anglaise of which he wrote the first volume devoted to the period extending up to 1660. Over time, this work established itself as a reference work. He was less interested in literary theory, and instead focused, according to René Wellek (Histoire de la Critique littéraire, volume 3), on the interpretation and the Esprit du Poète . He was particularly interested in the poets William Wordsworth (from 1896, with a study by The Prelude, in La Jeunesse de Wordsworth), Geoffrey Chaucer and Edmund Spenser. In his Défense de la poésie française à l'usage des lecteurs anglais (1912), he championed French literature which, in his opinion, was under-valued by the English. In his analyzes of English literature, he also puts forward French references, for example when he thinks he recognizes a certain French good humor in Chaucer, or in his criticism of the excessive use of lyricism in the work of Shakespeare (of which he published a selection in Paris, in 1899).

He is one of the authors and supervisor of a collective French translation of Chaucer's Canterbury Tales (1908) (which won the Prix Langlois from the French Academy in 1907 and 1909) and in 1928, of an anthology of Wordsworth's poems which he translates into French.

He also collaborated with several magazines such as Études anglaises, the Revue anglo-américaine, the Revue germanique, the Revue critique, the Revue universitaire.

== Family ==
On November 21, 1891, he married Claire Chambard, a granddaughter of the doctor, botanist and politician Jacques Hénon (1802–1872). The couple had four children among whom the eldest, Pierre (born in 1892) became a professor at the faculty of letters of Lyon, and the fourth, a girl named Henriette (born in 1897) was, like her father, associate of English and professor in high schools for young girls. She married, in 1927, Georges Connes (1890–1974), also professor of English literature who became a famous Resistance fighter, politician, and brief predecessor of Canon Félix Kir as Mayor of Dijon in 1944 and 1945.

== Works ==
- La Jeunesse de Wordsworth, 1896 (English translation: Early Life of William Wordsworth), London, Dent, 1897; reprinted 1971 (online version). Prix Sobrier-Arnould of the Académie française in 1897.
- Geoffrey Chaucer, Paris, 1910, English translation: London, Dent, New York, Dutton, 1913, New York, Russell and Russell, 1961 (online version). Prix Montyon of the Académie française in 1911.
- William Wordsworth and Annette Vallon, 1922, Hamden (Connecticut), Archon Books, 1967 (online version).
- Spenser, London, 1923, English translation: New York, 1926; Norwood Editions, 1976. Prix Marcelin Guérin of the Académie française in 1924.
- Wordsworth in a new light, Harvard University Press, Oxford University Press, 1923; Norwood Editions, 1977.
- (With Louis Cazamian) Histoire de la littérature anglaise, Volume 1, 1924, English translation : History of English literature, Volume 1 (The Middle Ages and the Renascence (650–1660)), New York, Macmillan, 1964, London, Dent, 1971.
- Short history of English literature, Oxford University Press, 1934.
