= Rae Blanchard =

American historian

Professor Rae Blanchard
- Born: 1889; Milton, Iowa
- Died: January 7, 1979; Baltimore
- Awards: Rose Mary Crawshay Prize (1945)

Academic background
- Education: University of Chicago

Academic work
- Discipline: English literature
- Sub-discipline: 18th-century
- Institutions: Goucher College
- Notable works: The Correspondence of Richard Steele (1941)

Rae Blanchard (1889, Milton, Iowa – January 7, 1972, Baltimore) was an American scholar of English literature, specialising in the works of Richard Steele, and a professor emerita of Goucher College. She won the British Academy's Rose Mary Crawshay Prize in 1945.

== Life ==
Rae Blanchard was born in 1889 at Milton, Iowa, to William Blanchard and Myrtle Jones. She attended high school in Milton and the Boston Normal School. She graduated from Colorado State Teachers' College in 1914 with a bachelor of arts degree in English literature. She then obtained master's degree from the University of Chicago, with a thesis on Michael Drayton. She attended the University of Oxford before returning to Chicago in 1925. Her doctoral dissertation was titled Richard Steele as a Moralist and Reformer.

Blanchard was an instructor at the University of Chicago before joining Goucher College as an assistant professor of English in 1929. Though a specialist in 18th century literature, her teaching focused more on contemporary fiction, which she felt was more relevant to students' lives than the classics. In 1933, while an associate professor, she was awarded a fellowship by the American Council of Learned Societies to prepare her edition of Richard Steele's correspondence. She travelled to England that summer to continue her research into Steele.

In 1934, Goucher College established a new programme of adult education. Blanchard presented a series of lectures on contemporary British and American poetry and fiction. She was elected as summer faculty at her alma mater, by now renamed to Colorado State College of Education, Greeley, in 1940.

Blanchard was elected president of the Edgar Allan Poe Society of Baltimore in 1941.

In 1945, Blanchard received the Rose Mary Crawshay Prize for her edited correspondence of Richard Steele. This was lauded for its careful scholarship and as a fecund sourcebook of 18th century English history.

After retirement in 1954, Blanchard was made professor emerita. In 1958, she was honoured with a Doctor of Letters degree by Goucher College. She continued to work on Steele's oeuvre, publishing a volume of his periodical journalism in 1959. Her eyesight failed in later years, and she died on January 7, 1972, after a long illness.

== Selected works ==
- "The French Source of Two Early English Feminist Tracts" (1929)
- The Correspondence of Richard Steele. Oxford University. 1941.
- Tracts and Pamphlets of Richard Steele. Johns Hopkins University. 1944.
- Richard Steele's Periodical Journalism, 1714–1716. Clarendon. 1959.
