= Una Ellis-Fermor =

Author, academic, literary critic

Una Mary Ellis-Fermor (20 December 1894 – 24 March 1958), who also used the pseudonym Christopher Turnley, was an English literary critic, author and Hildred Carlile Professor of English at Bedford College, London (1947–1958). In recognition of her services to London University, there is now an award in her name to provide assistance for research students in the publication of scholarly work, in the fields of English, Irish or Scandinavian drama to which Fermor-Ellis herself had been a notable contributor.

She has been described as "A major contributor to the study of the English Renaissance".

== Biography ==
Educated at South Hampstead High School, Ellis-Fermor gained an exhibition award to read English at Somerville College, Oxford. Here she met and developed a friendly scholarly rivalry with fellow exhibitioner Vera Brittain. In 1918 Ellis-Fermor became a lecturer in English Literature at Bedford College, and in 1930 was awarded the Rose Mary Crawshay prize for English Literature by the British Academy for her work on Christopher Marlowe and her edition of Tamburlaine.

In 1938 Ellis-Fermor published Twenty Two Poems under the pseudonym Christopher Turnley, derived from Marlowe's first name and the middle name of her father, Joseph Turnley Ellis-Fermor.

Appointed the first General Editor of the 2nd series of the Arden Shakespeare in 1946 and Hildred Carlile Professor of English Language and Literature at Bedford College in 1947, Ellis-Fermor continued to contribute to the fields of English, Irish and Scandinavian drama (she translated Ibsen for Penguin Books) until her death in 1958.

== Major publications ==
- Christopher Marlowe (1927)
- The Jacobean Drama: An Interpretation (1936)
- The Irish Dramatic Movement (1939)
- Masters of Reality (1942)
- The Frontiers of Drama (1945)
- Shakespeare the Dramatist and Other Papers (1961), edited by Kenneth Muir
