= Jane Elizabeth Norton =

British librarian and bibliographer

Jane Elizabeth Norton (25 October 1893 – 24 November 1962) was an English librarian and bibliographer. She was the bibliographer of Edward Gibbon and editor of his correspondence.

Jane Norton was the daughter of Henry Turton Norton, a wealthy solicitor who lived at Kentwell Hall in Long Melford. An older brother was H. T. J. (Harry) Norton, a mathematical population geneticist at Trinity College, Cambridge (the Henry Tertius James Norton, "H.T.J.N.", to whom Eminent Victorians by Lytton Strachey is dedicated). She was educated at Francis Holland School before studying History and Economics at Newnham College, Cambridge and studying Social Sciences at Columbia University.

In 1926 she became honorary librarian to the Women’s Service Library, later maintained by the Fawcett Society, cataloguing the feminist collection there. In 1929 Norton became a director of the London antiquarian booksellers Birrell and Garnett. There she corresponded with Andre Gide, helping him to find books of interest in English. She also collected material for her bio-bibliography of Gibbon, which appeared in 1940.

During the war she helped organize books for prisoners of war, and after the war she compiled a Guide to National and Provincial Directories for the Royal Historical Society. However her main activity was preparing her edition of Gibbon’s letters, which appeared in 1956 and won her the British Academy’s Rose Mary Crawshay Prize in 1957.

In 1959 she was appointed general editor of the catalogue of the Pepys Library at Magdalene College, Cambridge, though she died before the project could be completed. She was elected a Fellow of Newnham College in 1960.

== Works ==
- A bibliography of the works of Edward Gibbon, Oxford University Press, 1940
- Guide to the national and provincial directories of England and Wales, excluding London, published before 1856, 1950
- The letters of Edward Gibbon, 3 vols, 1956
