= Evelyn M. Simpson =

English literary scholar (1885 - 1963)

Evelyn Simpson
- Born: Evelyn Mary Spearing; 2 September 1885; Cambridge, England
- Died: 8 September 1963 (aged 78)
- Education: Bedford College, University of London; St. Hugh's College, Oxford
- Alma mater: Newnham College, Cambridge
- Occupation: Scholar
- Spouse: Percy Simpson (m. 1921; died 1962)
- Children: Edward Spearing Simpson (1923–1953); Mary Spearing Simpson Fleay (1924–2013)
- Writing career
- Language: English
- Genre: Literary criticism
- Notable work: The Sermons of John Donne
- Notable awards: Rose Mary Crawshay Prize

Evelyn Mary Simpson (2 September 1885 – 8 September 1963) was an English literary critic and scholar, and the first woman to earn a D.Phil. from Oxford University. Though she was required to relinquish her appointment at St Hugh's College, Oxford upon marrying in 1921, Simpson continued her work as an independent scholar. She is best known for her scholarship on John Donne, including a magisterial edition of his sermons and editions of other prose works, but she wrote on other topics in English Renaissance literature as well.

== Early life and education ==
Evelyn Mary Spearing was born in Cambridge on 2 September 1885, to James Spearing, solicitor for Cambridge University, and his wife, Fanny Elizabeth (Clayton) Spearing. She described her father as ostensibly conservative but in fact supportive of her choices in education and marriage. After attending the Perse School for Girls from 1902 to 1905, Spearing progressed to Newnham College, Cambridge, where she gained a First in Medieval and Modern Language in 1908.

From 1909 to 1912, Simpson continued her studies at Bedford College, University of London, earning her M.A. During this time, she began to establish herself as a scholar of Renaissance drama, publishing The Elizabethan Translations of Seneca’s Tragedies (1912) and Studley’s Translations of Seneca’s Agamemnon (1913). In 1913, she became an Associate of Newnham College, Cambridge, holding the title until 1927.

== World War I ==
The second volume of Simpson's Studley’s Translations was lost when the Louvain University Press was destroyed during World War I, and in 1914, Simpson ceased her academic work in order to work as a nurse until 1918. She served at the British Red Cross and military hospitals in both the UK and France. David Phillips writes in the ODNB:

"It was an act of considerable courage for a pioneering woman university teacher and scholar to interrupt an academic career in Cambridge to work as a Voluntary Aid Detachment (VAD) nurse in the difficult conditions prevailing in France in 1915. In her account of her experiences, From Cambridge to Camiers under the Red Cross, published in 1917, Evelyn Spearing shows a profound and tender compassion for the ordinary wounded combatants in her care."

Virginia Woolf wrote a review in 1917 of From Cambridge to Camiers in the Times Literary Supplement, and praised Spearing for her clear-eyed resolve, adding that “something of the excitement of a student plunged from books into practical work and finding herself quite capable of it [is] perceptible in her account” of those years. Nonetheless, Spearing viewed the war up close and as a tragedy, writing, “One night my eye fell on a newspaper headline, ‘Victory Cheaply Bought’, and it seemed a most ghastly mockery (58-9).”

== Oxford and marriage ==
From 1919 to 1921, Spearing held a post as a Tutor at St. Hugh's College, Oxford University, and in 1922 she became the first woman to be awarded a D.Phil. degree at Oxford. At this time she married Percy Simpson (a University Lecturer at Oxford, and editor at Clarendon Press); it was because of her marriage that she was forced to relinquish her position at Oxford, as married women were not allowed to hold positions as Tutors until 1945.

Remarkably, and with support from her husband, Simpson continued her academic work through the following decades, during which she also raised her two children: Edward Spearing Simpson (1923–53) and Mary Simpson Fleay (1924-2013). Mary would later write of her mother:

"She [Evelyn Simpson] was not a strong feminist—she was certainly never a suffragette—though she upheld the view that women should be highly educated & able to use their abilities. In this she was not in conflict with my father, who, for a Victorian, held extremely liberal opinions. Of the two my mother was the more brilliant & my father always acknowledged this."

== Academic work ==
Simpson is best known for her pioneering 10-volume edition of The Sermons of John Donne (University of California Press 1953-62), which she co-edited with George Potter (1895-1954), Professor of English at the University of California, Berkeley. Potter's institutional and financial support for this project was indispensable, as British university presses were unable to finance the publication in the aftermath of war and Simpson herself had no institutional support or income. Simpson, however, did the majority of the academic work: she was the greater authority on Donne, and Potter died in 1954, leaving Simpson to edit the remaining volumes herself with the continued financial support of the University of California Press. This edition remained the standard edition of Donne's sermons into the twenty-first century.

Simpson also co-edited the latter half of the 11-volume Oxford edition of the works of Ben Jonson (1925–52), and her editions of Donne's Courtier’s Library and Essayes in Divinity remained standard into the twenty-first century. She also wrote criticism on Elizabethan drama and other seventeenth-century English authors. In 1955, she won the Rose Mary Crawshay Prize from the British Academy for work by a Woman on English Literature.

== Legacy ==
Simpson was part of a network of woman scholars (along with fellow Renaissance scholar Helen Gardner) in the UK in the first half of the twentieth century, who faced challenges of prejudice and financial hardship memorably chronicled in Virginia Woolf's 1928 A Room of One’s Own and Dorothy L. Sayers’ 1935 mystery novel Gaudy Night. Two of the lectures comprising A Room of One’s Own were first delivered at Simpson’s Newnham College. At Simpson's death in 1963, Gardner wrote in the London Times obituary:

“Like her husband, Evelyn Simpson had a great capacity for enjoyment. Like him she was a good fighter and thought errors should be combated. Warm-hearted and affectionate, she combined with complete naturalness the roles of wife, mother, and latterly, grandmother, friend, and scholar."

== Selected works ==
- Herford, Charles Harold, Percy Simpson and Evelyn Simpson (eds.). Ben Jonson. 11 vols. Oxford: Clarendon Press, 1925-1952.
- —. “Donne and the Elizabethan Stage.” In “An Unpublished Manuscript on John Donne: Retrospect and Prospect,” ed. Chanita Goodblatt, John Donne Journal 28 (2009): 73–91.
- —. “Jonson and Dickens: A Study in the Comic Genius of London.” Essays and Studies of the English Association 29 (1943): 82–92.
- —. “The Local Setting of Henry Vaughan’s Poetry.” Anglo-Welsh Review 21.47 (1972): 60–70.
- —. A Study of the Prose Works of John Donne. Oxford: Clarendon Press, 1924.
- —. A Study of the Prose Works of John Donne. Second edition. Oxford: Clarendon Press, 1948.
- — (ed.). The Courtier’s Library, or Catalogus librorum aulicorum incomparabilium et non vendibilium. With a translation by Percy Simpson. London: Nonesuch Press, 1930.
- — (ed.). Donne’s Sermon of Valediction at his Going into Germany, Preached at Lincoln’s Inn, April 18, 1619. Printed from the Original Version in the Lothian and Ashmole Manuscripts and from XXVI Sermons. London: Nonesuch Press, 1932.
- — (ed.). Essays in Divinity. By the late Dr Donne. Being several disquisitions, interwoven with meditations and prayers: before he entered into Holy Orders. Now made publick by his son J. D. [John Donne]. Oxford: Clarendon Press, 1952.
- — (ed.). John Donne’s Sermons on the Psalms and Gospels. Berkeley: University of California Press, 1963.
- — and George Reuben Potter (eds.). The Sermons of John Donne. 10 vols. Berkeley: University of California Press, 1953–1962.
- Spearing, Edward. The Patrimony of the Roman Church in the Time of Gregory the Great. Ed. Evelyn M. Spearing. Cambridge: Cambridge University Press, 1918.
- Spearing, Evelyn Mary. “Alexander Nevile’s Translation of Seneca’s ‘Oedipus’.” Modern Language Review 15.4 (1920): 359–363.
- —. The Elizabethan Translations of Seneca’s Tragedies. Cambridge: W. Heffer & Sons, 1912.*
- —. From Cambridge to Camiers under the Red Cross. Cambridge: W. Heffer & Sons,
- —. (ed.). Studley’s Translations of Seneca’s Agamemnon and Medea. Edited from the Octavos of 1566. Louvain: A. Uystpruyst, 1913.
