= Rosemond Tuve =

American scholar of English literature, professor

- Born: November 29, 1903; Canton, South Dakota, United States
- Died: December 20, 1964 (aged 61)
- Education: University of Minnesota, Bryn Mawr College, Somerville College, Oxford
- Occupations: scholar of English literature, professor
- Known for: first woman appointed professor of English at the University of Pennsylvania
- Parents: Anthony G. Tuve (Augustana College president (father); Ida Larsen Tuve, music instructor (mother)
- Relatives: Merle Tuve, geophysicist

Rosemond Teresa Marie Tuve (November 29, 1903 – December 20, 1964) was an American scholar of English literature, specializing in Renaissance literature—in particular, Edmund Spenser. She published four books on the subject (Elizabethan and Metaphysical Imagery: Renaissance Poetic and Twentieth-century Critics, A Reading of George Herbert, Images & Themes in Five Poems by Milton, and Allegorical Imagery; Some Mediaeval Books And Their Posterity) along with several essays.

In her professional life, Rosemond Tuve worked as a professor of English at many elite institutions. She was a Fellow in the English Departments at Bryn Mawr College. She then went on to be an English Instructor at Goucher College, Vassar College and Connecticut College. Tuve moved from English Instructor to full professorship at Connecticut College where she stayed for twenty-nine years. During her time as a professor at Connecticut College, Tuve spent several semesters as a visiting lecturer at other academic institutions including the University of Minnesota and Harvard University. After Tuve left Connecticut College, she moved to a job as a lecturer at Princeton University, followed by a job as a visiting professor and Senior Fellow of the Council of the Humanities at Princeton University. Finally, Rosemond Tuve was an English Professor at the University of Pennsylvania until she died in 1964.

== Biography ==
She was born November 29, 1903, in Canton, South Dakota, the daughter of Anthony G. Tuve, the president of Augustana College, and Ida Larsen Tuve, instructor of music there. One of her older brothers is Merle Tuve, a geophysicist.

She received her BA in 1924 from the University of Minnesota, and received a scholarship for graduate study at Bryn Mawr College, where she was awarded an MA, in 1923. Following further study at Somerville College, Oxford, England, she received a PhD from Bryn Mayr in 1931. After further study in England and France, she was appointed instructor of English at Connecticut College in 1934. She was promoted to assistant professor in 1936, associate professor in 1942, and full professor in 1947. She remained at Connecticut until 1962, when she was appointed professor of English at the University of Pennsylvania, the first woman to be appointed to that position. After teaching there for three terms, she died of a stroke on December 20, 1964.

== Publications ==
Her first published work, Seasons and Months: Studies in a Tradition of Middle English Poetry. was her PhD thesis, published in Paris by Libraire Universitarie in 1933. She subsequently published the following books:

- Elizabethan and Metaphysical Imagery: Renaissance Poetic and Twentieth-century Critics, Chicago, Ill., University of Chicago Press, 1947. 442 p. OCLC 245173
  - Reprinted: 1961, OCLC 12000218; 1971, ISBN 978-0-226-81819-1
  - Review, W K Wimsatt; Journal of Aesthetics and Art Criticism, March, 1948, vol. 6, no. 3, p. 277-279
  - Review, "Tradition and the Academic Talent" H. M. McLuhan The Hudson Review, Summer, 1948, vol. 1, no. 2, p. 270-273
  - Review, Rosemary Freeman Review of English Studies, October, 1948, vol. 24, no. 96, p. 331-332
  - Review, Marvin T Herrick; Modern Language Notes, February, 1949, vol. 64, no. 2, p. 125-127
- A Reading of George Herbert Chicago, University of Chicago Press, 1952. 215 p. OCLC 357917
  - Review, Arnold Stein Modern Language Notes, December, 1954, vol. 69, no. 8, p. 610-613
  - Review, Joan Bennett Modern Philology, November, 1953, vol. 51, no. 2, p. 135-137
- Images & Themes in Five Poems by Milton, Cambridge, Harvard University Press, 1957. 161 p. OCLC 5212894
  - Repr, 1967
  - Review, Millar MacLure Modern Philology, August, 1958, vol. 56, no. 1, p. 64-65
  - Review, Arnold Stein; Journal of Aesthetics and Art Criticism, September, 1958, vol. 17, no. 1, p. 119-121
  - Review, A J Smith; Review of English Studies, August, 1959, vol. 10, no. 39, p. 309-311
  - Review, Merritt Y Hughes; Modern Language Notes, November, 1958, vol. 73, no. 7, p. 527-532
- Allegorical Imagery; Some Mediaeval Books And Their Posterity, Princeton, N.J., Princeton University Press, 1966. 461 p. OCLC 7167435
  - Review, Richard H Green, Comparative Literature, Winter, 1967, vol. 19, no. 1, p. 83-86
  - Review, William Matthews Renaissance Quarterly, Autumn, 1967, vol. 20, no. 3, p. 345-347
  - Review, Robert Kaske Speculum: A Journal of Mediaeval Studies, Jan., 1967, vol. 42, no. 1, p. 196-199

A selection of her essays, was published as Essays: Spenser, Herbert, Milton, ed. by Thomas P Roche, Princeton [N.J.] Princeton University Press, 1970. ISBN 978-0-691-06171-9

== Education ==
- University of Minnesota (June, 1924), Graduated cum laude
- Bryn Mawr College, Master's degree (May, 1925)
- Somerville College, Oxford (1928-1929)
- Bryn Mawr College, PH.D (1931)
- Augustana College, Doctor of Letters degree (1952)
- Wheaton College, Doctors of Letters Degree (1957)
- Mt. Holyoke College, Doctor of Letters degree (1959)
- Carleton College, Doctor od Letters degree (1961)
- Syracuse University, Doctor of Humane Letters (1962)

== Work ==
- Fellow in English Department, Bryn Mawr College (1925-1926)
- English Instructor, Goucher College (1928-1928)
- English Instructor, Vassar College (1929-1932)
- English Instructor, English Professor, Connecticut College (1934-1963)
- Visiting Lecturer, University of Minnesota (1952)
- Visiting Lecturer, Harvard University (1956)
- Senior Fulbright Research Fellow, Oxford University (1957-1958)
- Lecturer, Princeton University (May and April 1959)
- Fellow of the American Academy of Arts and Sciences (May, 1959)
- NATO Research Fellowship, University of Aarhus, Denmark (1960)
- Visiting Professor, Senior Fellow of the Council of the Humanities, Princeton University (1961-1962)
- Professor of English, University of Pennsylvania (1963-1964)

== Honors ==
- 1952: Honorary Doctor of Letters (Ll.D.) from Augustana College.
- 1955: Achievement Award, American Association of University Women.
- 1956: Visiting Lecturer, Harvard University
- 1957: Honorary Doctor of Letters (Ll.D.) from Wheaton College.
- 1957-58, Senior Fulbright Research Fellow, Oxford.
- 1959: Fellow, American Academy of Arts and Sciences
- 1959, Honorary Doctor of Letters (Ll.D.) from Mt. Holyoke College.
- 1960, NATO Research Fellowship, University of Aarhus
- 1961, Honorary Doctor of Letters, Carleton College.
- 1961-62 Visiting Professor, Princeton University
- 1963, Honorary Doctor of Humane Letters, Syracuse University.
