= Jean Robertson (author) =

British scholar of English Renaissance literature (1913–1990)

Jean Robertson (also known as Jean Bromley; 27 September 1913 – 23 August 1990 Birmingham) was a British scholar of English Renaissance literature. She won the British Academy's Rose Mary Crawshay Prize in 1974.

== Life ==
Jean Robertson was born in 1913 to Ainslie Robertson and Phyllis Mary Raeghton. She attended Howell's School, Denbigh and graduated from the University of Liverpool. She was an assistant lecturer at Liverpool between 1937–1942 in the English department. In 1939, she married J. S. Bromley, a naval historian (1913–1985). By 1942, she was working for the Board of Trade on war service.

She was a research fellow at the Huntington Library in California, publishing articles, among others, on Nicholas Breton.

Robertson taught English literature at Liverpool till 1949. She was in Oxford, where her husband was a Fellow of Keble College, from 1949–1960. In 1964, she became a lecturer at the University of Southampton, and Reader in 1972.

From the 1950s, she was an assistant editor of The Review of English Studies at Oxford, to which she contributed articles for several decades. She was also a secretary of the Oxford Bibliographical Society.

Jean Robertson died in 1990 in Birmingham.

== Research ==
Robertson's treatise on medieval letter-writing manuals (The Art of Letter Writing, 1942) was well-received. She traced over two centuries of English letter writers, beginning with Latin formularies, and pointing out the social significance of the changes in epistolary models over the period. For instance, the popularity of Nicholas Breton's A Poste with a Packet of Madde Letters (1602), she showed, sparked a trend for pithy and entertaining guides to correspondence. However, other scholars criticised the work for not establishing clearly enough what the golden standard was for letters: a simple style (as espoused by Sir Thomas Browne or Hannah Woolley) or affected (as evidenced in Cupids Messenger (1672)).

Robertson produced the first reliable edition of Philip Sidney's Old Arcadia in 1973. There had been five manuscripts found in 1907 but only one of these, arbitrarily chosen by Albert Feuillerat, was printed in 1926, with no effort to establish concordance between the copies. By the time Robertson began her work, nine manuscripts were known, and she divided these into four groups, representing four revisions by Sidney, before his drastic rewrite into the New Arcadia. Her introduction was called a model of completeness, and the commentary admirably analytic.

== Honours ==
Robertson won the 1974 Rose Mary Crawshay Prize for her edition of Philip Sidney's Old Arcadia. In 1979, Robertson was awarded a Doctor of Letters honoris causa degree by the University of Southampton.

The International Sidney Society instituted the Jean Robertson Lifetime Achievement Award in her honour.

== Selected works ==
- The Art of Letter Writing: An essay on the handbooks published in England during the sixteenth and seventeenth centuries. London: University Press of Liverpool. 1942.
- Poems by Nicholas Breton. 1952.
- Sidney, Philip (1973). Robertson, Jean (ed.). The Countess of Pembroke's Arcadia: The Old Arcadia. Oxford University.
