= Rosemary Cowler =

American scholar (1925–2011)

- Born: May 10, 1925; Fort Wayne, Indiana
- Died: February 27, 2011 (aged 85); Lake Forest, Illinois
- Education: Rutgers University, Indiana University, Yale University

Rosemary Cowler (May 10, 1925, Fort Wayne, Indiana – February 27, 2011, Lake Forest, Illinois) was an American scholar of 17th and 18th century English literature. She was Hotchkiss Presidential Professor of English, Emerita, at Lake Forest College in Illinois, and a winner of the British Academy's Rose Mary Crawshay Prize in 1986.

== Life ==
Rosemary Elizabeth Cowler was born in 1925 in Fort Wayne, Indiana, to John A. Cowler and Rose Cowler (née Rosella Plummer). She graduated from the Douglass College of Rutgers University with high honours. She obtained an MA from Indiana University and a doctorate from Yale University (1956).

Cowler joined the English literature department of Lake Forest College, Illinois, in 1955. She was promoted to full Professorship in 1968. In 1986, she became the first Hotchkiss Presidential Professor, which she held till retirement in 1995. She was the head of the department from 1976 through 1985, and a Faculty Marshal from 1974 to 1995.

She won the Rose Mary Crawshay Prize in 1986. In 1989, Rutgers bestowed its Alumni Award for Distinguished Service on her.

Rosemary Cowler died in 2011.

== Research ==
Cowler published her edition of the works of Alexander Pope in 1986, completing the compilation begun at Yale with Norman Ault. She provided full and illuminating introductions and analyses of the various items, establishing the volume as a standard work, and winning the Rose Mary Crawshay Prize.

In 2000, Cowler's co-written history of Lake Forest College, Thirty Miles North, appeared.

== Selected works ==
- Cowler, Rosemary, ed. (1969). Twentieth Century Interpretations of Pamela. Prentice Hall.
- Cowler, Rosemary, ed. (1986). The Prose Works of Alexander Pope, Volume II: The Major Works 1725-1744. Hamden, Connecticut: Archon Press.
- Schulze, Franz; Cowler, Rosemary; Miller, Arthur (2000). Thirty Miles North. Lake Forest College. ISBN 9780963818966.
