= Grace Dulais Davies =

Welsh scholar (died 1969)

Grace Dulais Davies (also known as Grace Gethin-Davies; born 1887 or 1888; died September 30, 1969) was a winner of the Rose Mary Crawshay Prize (1918).

Grace Margaretta Dulais Davies was born in Llangollen in 1887 or 1888, the youngest child of Gethin Davies, principal of North Wales Baptist College, Bangor, and Rose Davies. She attended the Bangor County Girls' School (Ysgol Sirol y Genethod), and went on to obtain BA (1907) and MA (1916) degrees in English from the University of Wales.

She won the Rose Mary Crawshay Prize (1918) for her work titled Historical Fiction of the Eighteenth Century. She was a student at King's College, London at the time.

She was the Headmistress of Abergavenny County High School for Girls when she co-founded the Abergavenny Art Group in April 1937.

Davies died in Cardiff on 30 September 1969.

== Bibliography ==
- "1891 England, Wales & Scotland Census: College, Berwyn Street, Llangollen Traian, Corwen, Denbighshire, Wales". FindMyPast.
- "1901 England, Wales & Scotland Census: Caedernen Villa, Bangor, Caernarvonshire, Wales". FindMyPast.
- "University of Wales: Degree List". Cardiff Times and South Wales Weekly News. August 3, 1907. p. 11.
- "University of Wales: Bangor Students' Successes". The North Wales Chronicle and Advertiser for the Principality.
- "The Crawshay Prize". The Times. December 17, 1918. p. 5.
- "Siaced Fraith: Grace Dulais Eto". Y Brython. December 26, 1918. p. 4.
- "Newyddion". Y Dydd. December 27, 1918.
- "England & Wales Government Probate Death Index 1858-2019". FindMyPast. p. 61.
- "Agnes Beverley Burton". Abergavenny Artists. Archived from the original on 26 January 2022.
