= Mary Freeman (marine biologist) =

Marine biologist

Mary Freeman (29 March 1924 – 4 March 2018), known professionally by her maiden name of Mary Whitear, was an English marine biologist and lecturer at University College London from 1947 to 1989. Freeman's research focused on the neurology, and the cellular structures of the skin of, fish and amphibians. She was known for her attempts to determine the skin colour of extinct animals such as the ichthyosaur and her meticulous drawings of fossils. Her husband was the zoologist Richard Broke Freeman. In retirement she took up the local history of Tavistock, Devon.

== Life ==
Mary Freeman was born on 29 March 1924 in Teignmouth, Devon, as Mary Whitear. Her father was a headmaster and keen sailor, and she could sail and row from an early age. She was educated at Maynard School in Exeter. She then attended Bedford College London, and Cambridge University. She was appointed a lecturer University College London in 1947, and worked there until 1989.

Freeman's research focused on the neurology, and the cellular structures of the skin of, fish and amphibians. She used histochemistry and scanning and transmission electron microscopy to investigate structures. She was known for her attempts to determine the skin colour of extinct animals such as the ichthyosaur and her meticulous drawings of fossils.

She married her husband, the zoologist Richard Broke Freeman, in 1958. They had two sons together. Richard died in 1986. In retirement, from 1989, Freeman took up the local history of Tavistock, Devon. She was secretary to the Tavistock History Society for many years, and wrote for The Devon Historian.

Freeman died on 4 March 2018.
