= Janet Montgomery (archaeologist) =

Archaeological scientist

Janet Montgomery FBA
- Born: 1 December 1960 (age 65)

Academic background
- Education: University of Bradford

Academic work
- Discipline: Archaeology
- Sub-discipline: Archaeological science; bioarchaeology; isotope analysis in archaeology
- Institutions: University of Bradford; Durham University

Janet Montgomery FBA (born 1 December 1960) is a British archaeological scientist and academic. Having studied at the University of Bradford, she is now Professor of Bioarchaeology at Durham University. She specialises in the study of diet and migration via tooth enamel biomineralisation and isotope analysis.

== Biography ==
Montgomery was born on 1 December 1960 in Huddersfield, West Riding of Yorkshire, England. She graduated from the University of Bradford in 1996 with a Bachelor of Science (BSc) degree in archaeological science. Janet was awarded a PhD in 2002. Her thesis was the first application of radiogenic lead and strontium isotope analysis to human remains from archaeological sites in Britain, to investigate diet and mobility.

From 2003 to 2007, Montgomery was a NERC postdoctoral fellow at the University of Bradford. She was then a lecturer in archaeological science from 2007 to 2010. Then, in 2011, she joined the University of Durham as a senior lecturer. She was promoted to reader in 2015, and appointed Professor of Bioarchaeology in 2018.

Montgomery's work ranges across archaeological periods, and methodological development. Montgomery collaborates with Jane Evans to undertake the environmental mapping of biosphere strontium in Britain. Montgomery has received grants from NERC, AHRC, ESRF, Wellcome Trust, British Academy, Royal Anthropological Institute, and the Leverhulme Trust.

In 2010, Montgomery won the Society for Medieval Archaeology's Martyn Jope Award for "the best novel interpretation, application of analytical method or presentation of new findings" published in that year's volume of Medieval Archaeology along with co-authors Christopher Knüsel, Catherine M. Batt, Gordon Cook, Carol Palmer, Gundula Müldner, Alan R. Ogden, Ben Stern, John Todd, and Andrew S Wilson. She is a member of the Academic Awards Committee of the Executive of the British Federation of Women Graduates. In July 2024, she was elected as a Fellow of the British Academy.

== Selected publications ==
- Killgrove, Kristina & Montgomery, Janet (2016). All Roads Lead to Rome: Exploring Human Migration to the Eternal City through Biochemistry of Skeletons from Two Imperial-Era Cemeteries (1st–3rd c AD). PLOS One 11(2): e0147585.
- Beaumont, J. & Montgomery, J. (2016). The Great Irish Famine: identifying starvation in the tissues of victims using stable isotope analysis of bone and incremental dentine collagen. PLOS One 11(8): e0160065.
- Beaumont, J. & Montgomery, J. (2015). Oral Histories: a simple method of assigning chronological age to isotopic values from human dentine collagen. Annals of Human Biology 42(4): 407–414.
- Montgomery, J., Grimes, V., Buckberry, J., Evans, J.A., Richards, M.P. & Barrett, J.H. (2014). Finding Vikings with Isotope Analysis: The View from Wet and Windy Islands. Journal of the North Atlantic Special volume 7: 54–70.
- Montgomery, J., Beaumont, J., Jay, A., Keefe, K., Gledhill, A., Cook, G., Dockrill, Stephen J. & Melton, N.D.(2013). Strategic and sporadic marine consumption at the onset of the Neolithic: increasing temporal resolution in the isotope evidence. Antiquity 87(338): 1060–1072.
- Montgomery, J., Evans, J.A. & Horstwood, M.S.A. (2010). Evidence for long-term averaging of strontium in bovine enamel using TIMS and LA-MC-ICP-MS strontium isotope intra-molar profiles. Environmental Archaeology 15(1): 32–42.
- Montgomery, J. (2010). Passports from the past: Investigating human dispersals using strontium isotope analysis of tooth enamel. Annals of Human Biology 37(3): 325–346.
- Montgomery, J., Evans, J. & Horstwood, M.S.A. (2009). Evidence for long-term averaging of Sr-87/Sr-86 in bovine enamel using TIMS and LA-MC-ICP-MS. Geochimica Et Cosmochimica Acta 73(13, Supplement 1): A896-A896.
- Montgomery, J., Evans, J.A. & Cooper, R.E. (2007). Resolving archaeological populations with Sr-isotope mixing models. Applied Geochemistry 22(7): 1502–1514.
- Montgomery, J., Evans, J.A. & Wildman, G. (2006). Sr-87/Sr-86 isotope composition of bottled British mineral waters for environmental and forensic purposes. Applied Geochemistry 21(10): 1626–1634.
- Montgomery, J., Evans, J., Powlesland, D. & Roberts, C.A. (2005). Continuity or colonisation in Anglo-Saxon England? Isotope evidence for mobility, subsistence practice, and status at West Heslerton. American Journal of Physical Anthropology 126(2): 123–138.
- Montgomery, J., Evans, J.A. & Neighbour, T. (2003). Sr isotope evidence for population movement within the Hebridean Norse community of NW Scotland. Journal of the Geological Society 160(5): 649–653.
- Montgomery, Janet, Budd, Paul & Evans, Jane (2000). Reconstructing the lifetime movements of ancient people: a Neolithic case study from southern England. European Journal of Archaeology 3(3): 370–385.
