= Judith Jesch =

British historian (born 1954)

- Born: 1954 (age 71–72)

Academic background
- Education: Durham University; University College London

Judith Jesch FBA, FRHistS, FSA, FSA Scot (born 1954) is a British scholar of Old Norse language and literature, runology, and the Viking Age. She was Professor of Viking Age Studies at the University of Nottingham until 2025. Jesch is chair of the international Runic Advisory Group and president of the English Place-Name Society.

== Biography ==
Jesch received her advanced education at Durham University and University College London. As a student at Durham in 1973, she co-wrote an article for Palatinate that accused the university of failing to attract candidates from a wide variety of backgrounds and suggested that Durham was now seen as a finishing school for the socially privileged.

Her research focuses on the relationships of language, texts and contexts in the Viking Age and medieval Scandinavia, with a particular focus on runic inscriptions, skaldic verse and historical sagas. She also writes on questions of orality and literacy, geography, migration and diaspora, and Scandinavian contacts with the British Isles. She was keynote speaker at the 2015 Norse in the North Conference, and is the Director of the Centre for the Study of the Viking Age (CSVA)

She is a fellow of the British Academy as of 2020, and a fellow of the Royal Historical Society, the Society of Antiquaries of London and the Society of Antiquaries of Scotland.

== Selected publications ==
- Women in the Viking Age. Boydell & Brewer Ltd. 1991. ISBN 978-0-85115-360-5.
- Ships and Men in the Late Viking Age: The Vocabulary of Runic Inscriptions and Skaldic Verse. Boydell & Brewer. 1 January 2001. ISBN 978-0-85115-826-6.
- Epigraphic Literacy and Christian Identity. Brepols, 2012. (Edited with K. Zilmer) ISBN 9782503542942
- Viking Poetry of Love and War. The British Museum Press, 2013. ISBN 9780714128306
- "Earl Rögnvaldr of Orkney: A Poet of the Viking Diaspora", Journal of the North Atlantic, Special Volume 4, 2013, pp. 154–60.
- "Runes and Words: Runic Lexicography in Context", Futhark: International Journal of Runic Studies. 4, 77-100, 2013.
- The Viking Diaspora. Taylor & Francis. 5 June 2015. ISBN 978-1-317-48253-6.

Edited

- Judith Jesch, ed. (1 July 2012). The Scandinavians from the Vendel Period to the Tenth Century: An Ethnographic Perspective. Boydell Press. ISBN 978-1-84383-728-2.
