= Annals of Human Biology =

- Discipline: Human Biology
- Language: English
- Edited by: Noël Cameron, Olga Rickards, Babette Zemel

Publication details
- History: 1974–present
- Publisher: Taylor & Francis (UK)
- Frequency: Bimonthly
- Open access: no
- Impact factor: 1.240 (2016)

Standard abbreviations
- ISO 4: Ann. Hum. Biol.

Indexing
- ISSN: 0301-4460 (print); 1464-5033 (web)

Links
- Journal homepage

Annals of Human Biology is a bimonthly academic journal that publishes review articles on human population biology, nature, development and causes of human variation. It is published by Taylor & Francis on behalf of the Society for the Study of Human Biology, of which it is the official journal.

== Coverage Includes ==
- Global health
- Ageing
- Epidemiology
- Ecology
- Environmental physiology
- Human genetics
- Auxology
- Population biology

== Society ==
Annals of Human Biology is the official journal of the Society for the Study of Human Biology

== Editors-in-Chief ==
Noël Cameron, Olga Rickards, and Babette Zemel are the Editors-in-Chief of Annals of Human Biology.

== Publication Format ==
Annals of Human Biology publishes six issues per year in simultaneous print and online editions.
