= Journal of the North Atlantic =

Peer-reviewed electronic academic journal

The Journal of the North Atlantic is an annual, peer-reviewed, online-only, academic journal covering the archaeology and environmental history of the peoples of the North Atlantic. It was established in 2008 and is published by Eagle Hill Publications. The editor-in-chief is Keith Goldfarb.

The journal is abstracted and indexed in Scopus.
