= Lucrezia Marinella =

Italian poet, author, philosopher, polemicist and women's rights advocate

Lucrezia Marinelli
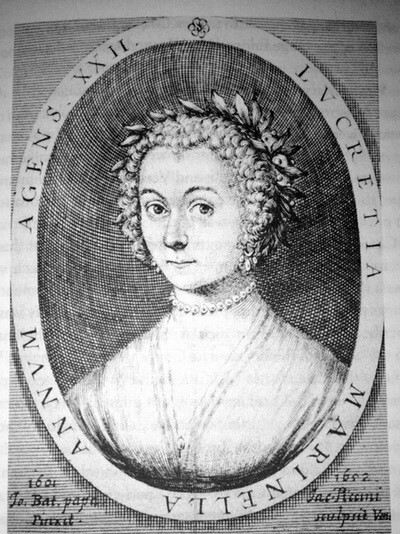
- Portrait of Marinella from 1652
- Born: Lucrezia Marinelli; 1571; Venice, Republic of Venice
- Died: 1653 (aged 81–82); Venice, Republic of Venice
- Occupations: Writer, poet
- Known for: Amore innamorato, et impazzato

Lucrezia Marinella (1571–1653) was a poet, writer, philosopher, polemicist, and women's rights advocate from the Republic of Venice. She is best known for her polemical treatise The Nobility and Excellence of Women and the Defects and Vices of Men (1600). Her works have been noted for bringing women into the philosophical and scientific community during the late Renaissance.

== Life ==
Lucrezia Marinella was the daughter of a physician and natural philosopher, Giovanni Marinelli, who wrote novels, some of which were on women’s well-being, hygiene and beauty. Although her father was not from Venice, Lucrezia and her family were "cittadinaza." Her brother, Curzo Marinella, was also a physician and Lucrezia married the physician Girolamo Vacca. None of her children seem to have been born in Venice. Her father might have been the vital link between her private studies and the writing and the wider world of Venetian literary circles, including the Accademia de’ Desiosi.

Marinella had a close relationship with Giovanni Nicoló Doglioni, one of the founders of the Venetian academy. She was supported by her peers and influential in the formation of the 'new' Venetian academy because of her powerful writing style and insight into women's rights. Marinella helped other female writers publish their works, a rarity at a time when women suffered countless restrictions. Female writers began to dispute claims made by male writers, such as Giuseppe Passi, author of the misogynist tract Dei donneschi difetti (On Women's Faults), showcasing their intelligence and rhetorical writing skills. Unlike other academies, women had institutional support from some male professors and peers, allowing them to negate prejudice about female inferiority.

In this era, many women entered convents or became courtesans (like the famous Veronica Franco). Entering a convent meant that a woman was not obligated to be married and could pursue education and spiritual development. But, at the same time the Roman Catholic Church maintained rigid theories of gender and expectations of women’s place and nature. However, Lucrezia Marinella did not enter the convent and wasn't pressured into marriage. She came from a professional family that very much encouraged her studies, and her father was extremely supportive. Although Marinella received support from her peers to delay marriage and further her education, she still had many barriers preventing her from writing. She lived during the Counter-Reformation, one of the most difficult periods in Italian history. The country was under Spanish domination, which led the Catholic church to dominate political liberty and impose new restrictions. These scrupulous religious, economic, social, and literary changes were put into effect when Marinella began her writing career. These restrictions limited her writing, but she was encouraged to persevere from emerging ideas from Christian Neoplatonists. They believed that for a perfect human mind, people must diverge from known gender differences to become a unisex being.

Although Lucrezia’s writing brought her fame, she lived her life in seclusion. It is believed that her solitary life is what allowed her to write so much so soon. But a life of seclusion was typical for women of her social rank in sixteenth-century Italy. She did not travel, except to local shrines, there is no evidence she gathered with other authors for discussions, and there is no record of her even attending meetings held in academies outside.

== Women in the Late Middle Ages and Early Renaissance ==
Women’s rights and the equality of women were a major focus of Marinella's writings. In the late Middle Ages and early Renaissance era in Italy, women were largely wives and mothers. Many women who wanted to pursue knowledge either had to be of elite standing, enter convents, or become courtesans. Women were normally not a part of political conversations and had to be extraordinary to be fully recognized in literature. Marinella talks in her writings about the tradition of female inequality that has persisted throughout Western culture and is rooted in Hebrew, Greek, Roman, and Christian ideals.

Although Marinella was one of the best recognized female writers of the time, which included Moderata Fonte, Arcangela Tarabotti and Veronica Franco. Marinella’s works mostly dealt with women’s rights and she even asserted that women were superior to men, which was a popular argument in that time for polemical and philosophical works. She does so through her work, La nobiltà et l'eccellenza delle donne co' diffetti et mancamenti de gli uomini. In response to anti-feminist writings by Passi, she notes that she is unimpressed with the thinking of men. Her writings often pursue root causes of anti-feminist thoughts.

In La nobiltà et l'eccellenza delle donne co' diffetti et mancamenti de gli uomini, she notes the root of anti-feminist thoughts potentially being attributed to the influence of Aristotle. She refuses to accept the idea of an imperfect woman, as suggested by Aristotelians. Marinella argued with their belief that women's cold humoral temperaments are inherently different, making them inferior to men. She does, however, use Aristotle's statements for support in her other arguments.

Marinella also wrote in the style of pastoral romance, as in Arcadia Felice. This genre was traditionally limited to male authors and featured male characters; however Arcadia Felice explores love and eroticism as a plot complication instead of a resolution.

The court of Ferrara encouraged writers to experiment with the pastoral form. Marinella embraced pastoral writings because it permitted her to describe a society that redefines the relationships between men and women. Pastoral writings among male writers still reinforced patriarchal values and contributed to detrimental beliefs about how women should contribute to society. Conversely, this literature style allowed female authors to experiment and expand female autonomy and power in social systems. Female writers saw writing as a form of self-expression which was discouraged in many elements of their own lives. Pastoral forms provided the perfect sanctuary for Marinella to encode details of her personal life into her writings, like in Arcadia Felice.

== Works ==
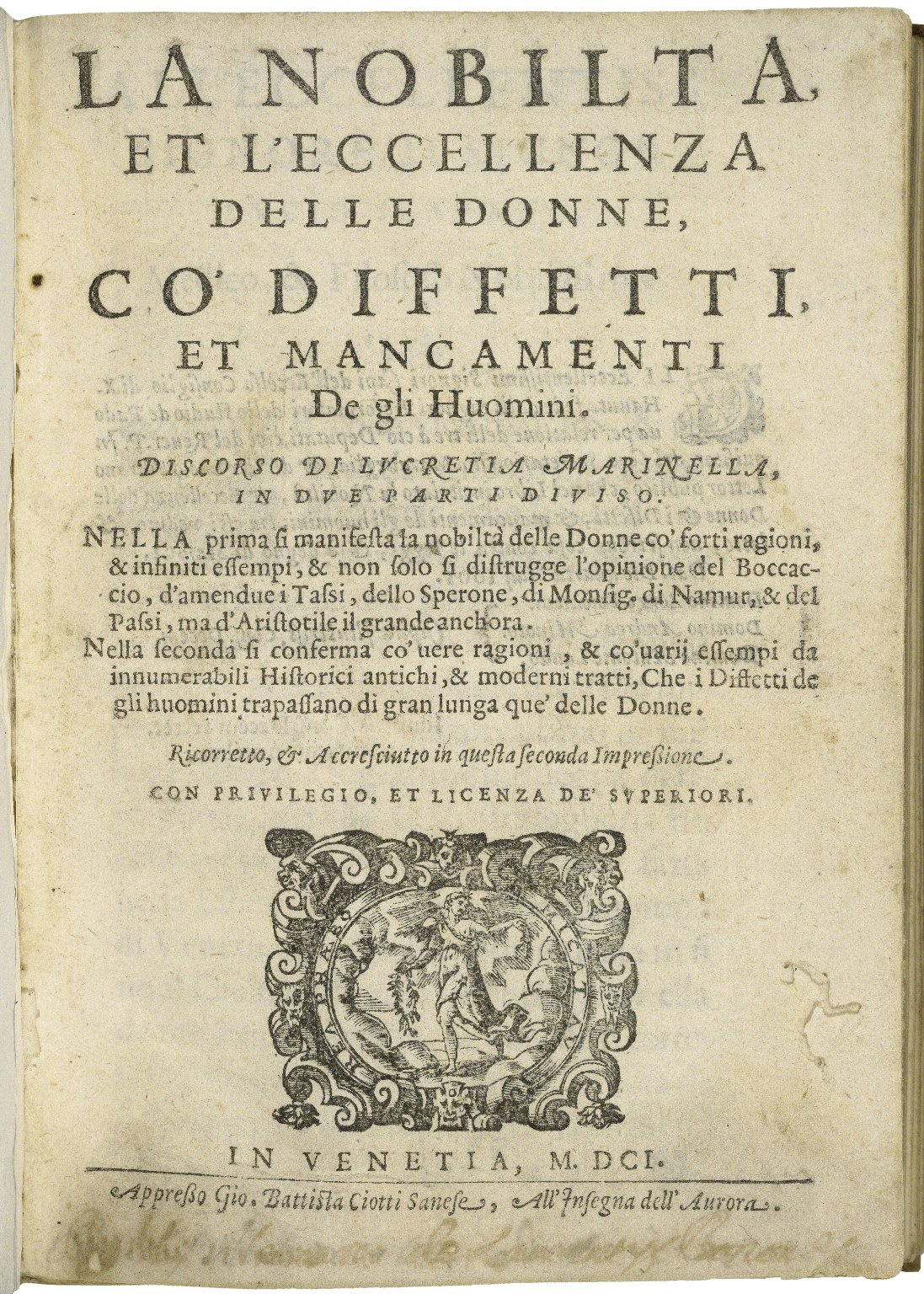
The title page of a 1601 edition of Marinella's La nobilita, et l’eccellenza delle donne.

Her work was not without controversy. She frequently wrote in response to polemics against women; La nobilita, et l’eccellenza delle donne was a defense of educated women who had the right to their opinion.

Marinella was a polished writer in many genres. Her work ranged from philosophical commentaries on poetry to religious works, and drew heavily on a wide variety of sources including scientific and mythological works. In her lifetime, Marinella published 10 books; there were sometimes as much as 10 years of silence between her works, notably after her marriage to Girolamo Vacca between 1606–1617. Her first polemic, The Nobility and Excellence of Women and the Defects and Vices of Men, saw light in 1600, and was composed quickly in response to Giuseppe Passi’s diatribe about women’s defects, “Dei donneschi difetti.” He outlines what he deems to be flaws of women including vanity, greed, and sexual excess. Marinella's articulated response to Passi's misogynistic claims propelled other people to show their disdain with his writing. Overwhelmed with feedback, Passi eventually stated that he believes he was misinterpreted and gradually moves away from spreading his extremist views about women.

Marinella took the first part of her own title from the Italian translation of a supposedly anonymous French tract, "Della nobilita et eccellenza delle donne," printed in Venice in 1549. The book was largely a long polemic of attacks against women and their defense. It also mounted an attack on men for exactly the same vices Passi had accused women of. The structure of her text follows that of Passi's, as she pits quotations and examples against each other. Many note that this was her most provocative writing and was likely set-off by Passi's demeaning of female learning and opinions. Marinella was the first woman in Italy to argue with a man in print, and it was the only time she wrote explicitly about the misogyny of Passi. Her vibrant responses to misogyny are the reason she is still recognized as one of the great examples of female erudition. It is thought that La nobilita, et l’eccellenza delle donne was published so quickly due to the connections Marinella had with the Venetian Academy.

In her work Enrico, Marinella selected a topic that was both religious and political, and that also built on her previous works. She highlighted the fact that women were excluded from the political discussion in this time. In the work, she expresses a patriotic pride in Venice and singles out a Venetian version of the events of the Fourth Crusade, about which no contemporary Venetian documents evidently existed. This point in the history of Venice reminds the reader of Venice’s destiny and import. In Enrico, Marinella chose to write in one of the highest literary genres of her time, that was for cultural reasons out of favor in Venice. Marinella’s warrior women in Enrico wear masculine armor with grace and dignity; they were written as respectable in deed and thought, and as chaste virgins (Querelle des femmes). Arcadia Felice also echoes the idea that love is restricting to women and detrimental to their liberty and creativity.

Marinella's work, Vita di Maria Vergine, written in 1602 is well known for recounting the life of the Virgin Mary. It is written in verse and prose. The sources for this work are often what sets it apart. Marinella used a combination of Gospel accounts and other gospels such as Pseudo-Matthew and the Protoevangelium of James, which are to be noted as apocryphal. However, Lucrezia Marinella has been accused of plagiarizing parts of this text. Scholar, Eleonora Carinci, noted that her work mirrored that of Pietro Aretino's.

Many Catholic females in the sixteenth and seventeenth centuries dedicated writings to the Virgin Mary. Marinella wrote one of the longest and articulated works on the Virgin Mary. She details the miracles Mary experienced and the power that can surround female propriety and interests. The importance Marinella, and other women, allocate on Mary as a positive role model was influential in redistributing purpose back to women and their abilities.

In Marinella's final work, Exhortations to Women and to Others if They Please, she seems to reverse course on her previous arguments, "praising the complete domestication of women and suggesting in the strongest of terms that they avoid scholarly pursuits...[and] remain firmly in...the private sphere, leaving the world of politics and philosophy for men...She [further] argues in favor of sequestration for women, places the greatest value on the skills women use while managing a home and raising children, and locates all female virtue in the domestic arts." ' She also lamented the state of women in literature and urged women to avoid a literary career. On seclusion, Lucrezia wrote: "I also stated this in my book entitled The Nobility and Excellence of Women, but now considering the issue in a more mature fashion, I am of the view that it is not the result of conscious manipulation nor the action of an angry soul, but the will and providence of nature and God." Despite her efforts and strong beliefs, her later writings seemed more affected by societal pressures and she seemed less convinced that women would ever fully be accepted as equals to men. In Exhortations, she warns women about pursuing professional careers out of their home because of how the system continuously oppresses the success of women.

Marinella's famous Nobility and Excellence of Women, introduced many protofeminist arguments still studied today. Her belief that the study of science was at the core of the debate surrounding women was made clear in this work. She outlines the need for equal education opportunity in both literature and sciences for women. In response to claims there were no educated women in arts and sciences, Marinella proceeds to list various intellectual achievements of women over several centuries, drawing from models such as Famous Women by Boccaccio.The Nobility and Excellence of Women, uses these past examples to construct a new definition of womanhood. This work can be viewed as not only as a women's rights argument, but also a look into women's potential in the scientific and intellectual realm. The Nobility and Excellence of Women is often compared to Moderata Fonte's The Worth of Women in academic circles.

=== List of works ===
---Marinella, L., 1595, La Colomba sacra, Poema eroico. Venice.

–––, 1597, Vita del serafico et glorioso San Francesco. Descritto in ottava rima. Ove si spiegano le attioni, le astinenze e i miracoli di esso, Venice.

–––, 1598, Amore innamorato ed impazzato, Venice.

–––, 1601a, La nobiltà et l'eccellenza delle donne co' diffetti et mancamenti de gli uomini. Discorso di Lucrezia Marinella in due parti diviso, G , Venice.

–––, 1601b, The Nobility and Excellence of Women, and the Defects and Vices of Men, Dunhill, A. (ed. and trans.), Chicago: The University of Chicago Press, 1999.

–––, 1602, La vita di Maria vergine imperatrice dell'universo. Descritta in prosa e in ottava rima, Venice.

–––, 1603, Rime sacre, Venice.

–––, 1605, L'Arcadia felice, Venice.

–––, 1605a, L'Arcadia felice, F. Lavocat (ed.), Florence: Accademia toscana di scienze e lettere, ‘La Colombaria’ 162, 1998.

–––, 1605b, Vita del serafico, et glorioso San Francesco. Descritto in ottava rima, Venice.

–––, 1606, Vita di Santa Giustina in ottava rima, Florence.

–––, 1617, La imperatrice dell'universo. Poema heroico, Venice.

–––, 1617a, La vita di Maria Vergine imperatrice dell'universo, Venice.

–––, 1617b, Vite de' dodeci heroi di Christo, et de' Quatro Evangelisti, Venice.

–––, 1624, De' gesti heroici e della vita meravigliosa della serafica Santa Caterina da Siena, Venice.

–––, 1635, L'Enrico ovvero Bisanzio acquistato. Poema heroico, Venice.

–––, 1645a, Essortationi alle donne et a gli altri se a loro saranno a grado di Lucretia Marinella. Parte Prima, Venice.

–––, 1645b, Exhortations to Women and to Others if They Please, L. Benedetti (ed. and trans.), Toronto: Centre for Reformation and Renaissance Studies, 2012.

== Personal life and influence ==
Francesco Agostino della Chiesa described her as " a woman of wondrous eloquence and learning" and asserted "it would be impossible to surpass her." Cristofero Bronzino pronounced her exceptional in writing prose and poetry, most accomplished in sacred compositions, and a supreme expert in moral and natural philosophy." Arcangela Tarabotti was also said to be one of her biggest admirers, but towards the end of her life Lucrezia was said to have "attacked" her. Her father's work as a physician influenced and spurred her curiosity about science. Marinella dedicated The Nobility and Excellence of Women to another doctor and friend of her father Lucio Scarano who took a particular interest in her literary formation. At one point, he called her "The adornment of our century" and compared her to Greek poet Corinna. Marinella dedicated her poem Amoro Innamorato et Impazzato to a female reader: Caterina de' Medici, Duchess of Mantua.

== Death ==
Marinella died of quartan fever, a form of malaria, in the Campiello dei Squillini in Venice on 9 October 1653. She was buried in the nearby parish church of S. Pantaleone.
