= Georges Ribemont-Dessaignes =

French writer, poet, playwright, and painter

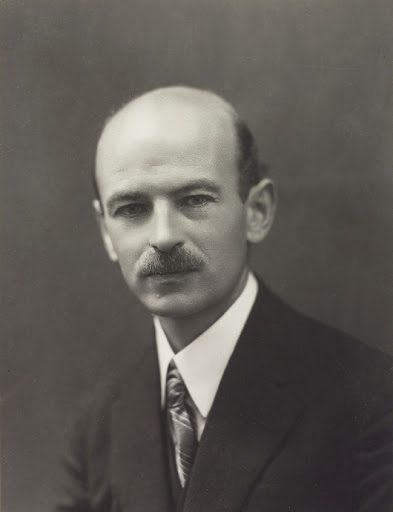
Georges Ribemont-Dessaignes photographed by Henri Manuel

Georges Ribemont-Dessaignes (June 19, 1884 – July 9, 1974) was a French anti-art painter, writer, poet, musician, playwright closely associated with the intended affront to aesthetic sensibilities that was the Dada movement. He was born in Montpellier and died in Saint-Jeannet.

Silence. (c. 1915) Oil on canvas, 36 1/4 × 28 7/8" (92.1 × 73.3 cm). In the collection of the MOMA, New York City.

His novels include L'Autruche aux yeux clos (1924), Ariane (1925), Le Bar du lendemain (1927), Céleste Ugolin (1928), and Monsieur Jean ou l'Amour absolu (1934).

== Life and work ==
As a young man, Ribemont-Dessaignes attended Académie Julian and the Ecole Beaux-Arts de Paris. In 1909 Ribemont-Dessaignes befriended Raymond Duchamp-Villon and through him met his brothers Marcel Duchamp and Jacques Villon. He joined their artistic circle at Puteaux, alongside painters Jean Metzinger, Albert Gleizes and Fernand Leger.

Following this association, he became one of the leading members of the French Dada group, alongside Tristan Tzara by creating numerous early Dada paintings and by contributing to the Dada periodical literature with plays, poetry, manifestos and opera librettos inspired by the movement’s anti-establishment principles. He contributed to Francis Picabia's magazine 391 and published several pamphlets of art criticism.

In composing aleatoric music in 1920 for Marguerite Buffet, he used chance-based procedures by using a pocket roulette wheel in the creation of his dissonant compositions Dance of the Curly Endive and Interloping Bellybutton. In a piece of Dada choreography he called Frontier Dance, Ribemont-Dessaignes remained still inside a cardboard tube as a self-imposed restriction on creative freedom that he adopted as a compositional principle.

Among Ribemont-Dessaignes' works for the theater are the plays The Emperor of China (1916) and The Mute Canary (1919), and the opera libretti The Knife's Tears (1926) and The Three Wishes (1926), both with music by Czech composer Bohuslav Martinů.

in 1922, Ribemont-Dessaignes, Tzara and Paul Eluard broke with André Breton's interpretation of Dada and Ribemont-Dessaignes became an independent writer and artist. He wrote an autobiographical book he called Adolescence that was published in 1930.

After the Second World War he settled in Juan-les-Pins, on the Côte d’Azur and wrote prefaces to literary works by such authors as Arthur Rimbaud, Denis Diderot, Stendhal, Leo Tolstoy and Voltaire. He also wrote books and articles about Modern Art artists, including Pablo Picasso, Georges Braque, Jean Dubuffet and Joan Miro and recorded radio interviews with Tristan Tzara, Marc Chagall and Henri Matisse. He also drew landscapes and published several books of his poetry. In 1955 he moved to the village of Saint-Jeannet, Alpes-de-Haute-Provence, near Vence, where he died in 1974.
