= Shakespeare Ladies Club =

London group lobbying for plays in 1730s

The Shakespeare Ladies Club (or Shakespeare Ladies' Club) refers to a group of upper class and aristocratic women who petitioned the London theatres to produce William Shakespeare's plays during the 1730s. In the 1700s they were referred to as "the Ladies of the Shakespear’s Club," (Note: In the eighteenth century Shakespeare's name was often written without the final "e"; quotations from the eighteenth century retain the original spelling in this article.) or even more simply as "Ladies of Quality," or "the Ladies." Known members of the Shakespeare Ladies Club include Susanna Ashley-Cooper, Mary Montagu, Duchess of Montagu (1689–1751),Elizabeth Boyd, and Mary Cowper. The Shakespeare Ladies Club was responsible for getting the highest percentage of Shakespeare plays produced in London during a single season in the eighteenth century; as a result they were celebrated by their contemporaries as being responsible for making Shakespeare popular again.

== History ==
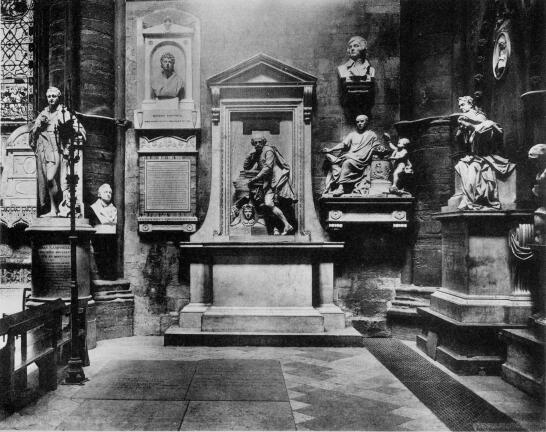
Poets' Corner in Westminster abbey, showing Scheemaker's statue of Shakespeare, paid for by the Shakespeare Ladies Club

The Shakespeare Ladies Club was organized in late 1736 with the expressed goal of persuading "London’s theatrical managers to give Shakespeare a greater share in their repertoires." The Ladies wanted to see more Shakespeare on stage because they preferred his plays to the inappropriate libertine content in Restoration comedies and the Italian operas that were dominating the London stage at the time. Within four years the Ladies’ Club had succeeded: one in every four performances in London during the 1740–41 season was a Shakespeare play. Shakespearean scholar Michael Dobson points out that this is "a record which even during Garrick’s professedly Bardolatrous management of Drury Lane was never challenged."

In addition to being responsible for the highest percentage of Shakespeare's plays performed in a single season during the eighteenth century, the Ladies’ Club was also responsible for Shakespeare's memorial statue in Poets' Corner in Westminster Abbey. Fundraising for the memorial statue began in 1738 and the statue was placed in Westminster Abbey in 1741. There were at least two benefit performances of Shakespeare plays done as part of the Ladies' Club's fundraising efforts. One was a performance of Julius Caesar on 28 April 1738 at Drury Lane. The other was a performance of Hamlet on 10 April 1739 at Theatre Royal, Covent Garden (also known as the Royal Opera House). Beyond the late 18th century the campaign of the Shakespeare Ladies Club was largely forgotten and the credit for the Poet's Corner statue was given to a committee of men

== Recognition by contemporaries ==
In January 1737 every performance of a Shakespeare play at Theatre Royal, Drury Lane (except for one command performance of Hamlet for the Prince and Princess of Wales) was done "At the Desire of several Ladies of Quality." While such a heading was not unusual in the early eighteenth century, it is significant that it occurred for every performance that month. As the Ladies’ gained influence over Drury Lane their popularity and success began to be recognized in prologues to performances of new plays and new adaptations of Shakespeare's plays. For the premiere of The Universal Passion, an adaptation of Much Ado About Nothing by James Miller, the prologue included an "ecstatic eulogy of the Shakespeare Ladies Club":

Britannia thus, with Folly’s Gloom overcast,

Has slumb’ring lain near half a Cent’ry past,
But now what Joy! to find the Night is o’er!
To see the Lamp of Science shine once more;
To see the Reign of Farce and Dulness end,
And Albion’s noble Fair to Shakespear’s Sense attend.
‘Twas this gave Birth to our Attempt to-night,
Fond to bring more of his rich Scenes to light:
But conscious how unequal to the Task,
Our Bard scarce dares your Clemency to ask:
. . . .
To You, ye Fair, for Refuge now he flies
And as you smile or frown, he lives or dies:
You are the ablest Judges of this Play,
Since Love’s almighty Pow’r’s his Theme today:
To your Protection Shakespear’s Offspring take,

And save the Orphan for the Father’s Sake.

On 4 March 1737 the manager of the New Haymarket Theater added "a New Prologue in the Characters of Shakespear’s Ghost, the Squire, Mr. Student, and Mr. Bays, concluding with an address to the Ladies of the Shakespear’s Club" to a performance of Shakespeare's The Life and Death of King John.

The benefit performance of Julius Caesar on 28 April 1738 included an epilogue from James Noel which echoed "Miller's metaphor of the Ladies' Club as mothers" responsible for the birth of Shakespeare as the nation's poet:

But here what humble thanks, what praise is due,

Ow'd to such gen'rous virtue, ow'd to you!
With grief you saw a bard neglected lie,
Whom towring genius living raised so high.
With grief you saw your Shakespeare's slighted state,
And call'd forth merit from the grave of fate.
Let others boast they smile on living worth;

You give a buried bard a brighter birth.

In addition to prologues the Shakespeare Ladies Club was also recognized in the daily newspapers. On 3 March 1737 the Grub Street Journal printed a letter from the ghosts of Shakespeare, Ben Jonson, John Dryden, and Nicholas Rowe to the theatre going public praising the Shakespeare Ladies Club for encouraging common sense and setting a good example for the gentlemen. The next day, 4 March 1737, the Daily Advertiser published a letter from Shakespeare's ghost "to the Fair Supporters of Wit and Sense, the Ladies of Great Britain." In this letter Shakespeare's ghosts praises the Ladies Club for their good taste and thanks them for forming the club and reviving "the Memory of the forsaken Shakespear."

=== David Garrick ===
David Garrick, the famous actor and theatre manager of Theatre Royal, Drury Lane, is often cited as the man responsible for Shakespeare's popularity in the eighteenth century. Garrick himself acknowledged the importance of the Ladies’ Club in a speech delivered at the Shakespeare Jubilee in 1769. In the speech Garrick said "It was You Ladies that restor’d Shakespeare to the Stage you form’d yourselves into a Society to protect his Fame, and Erected a Monument to his and your own honour in Westminster Abbey."

=== Eliza Haywood ===
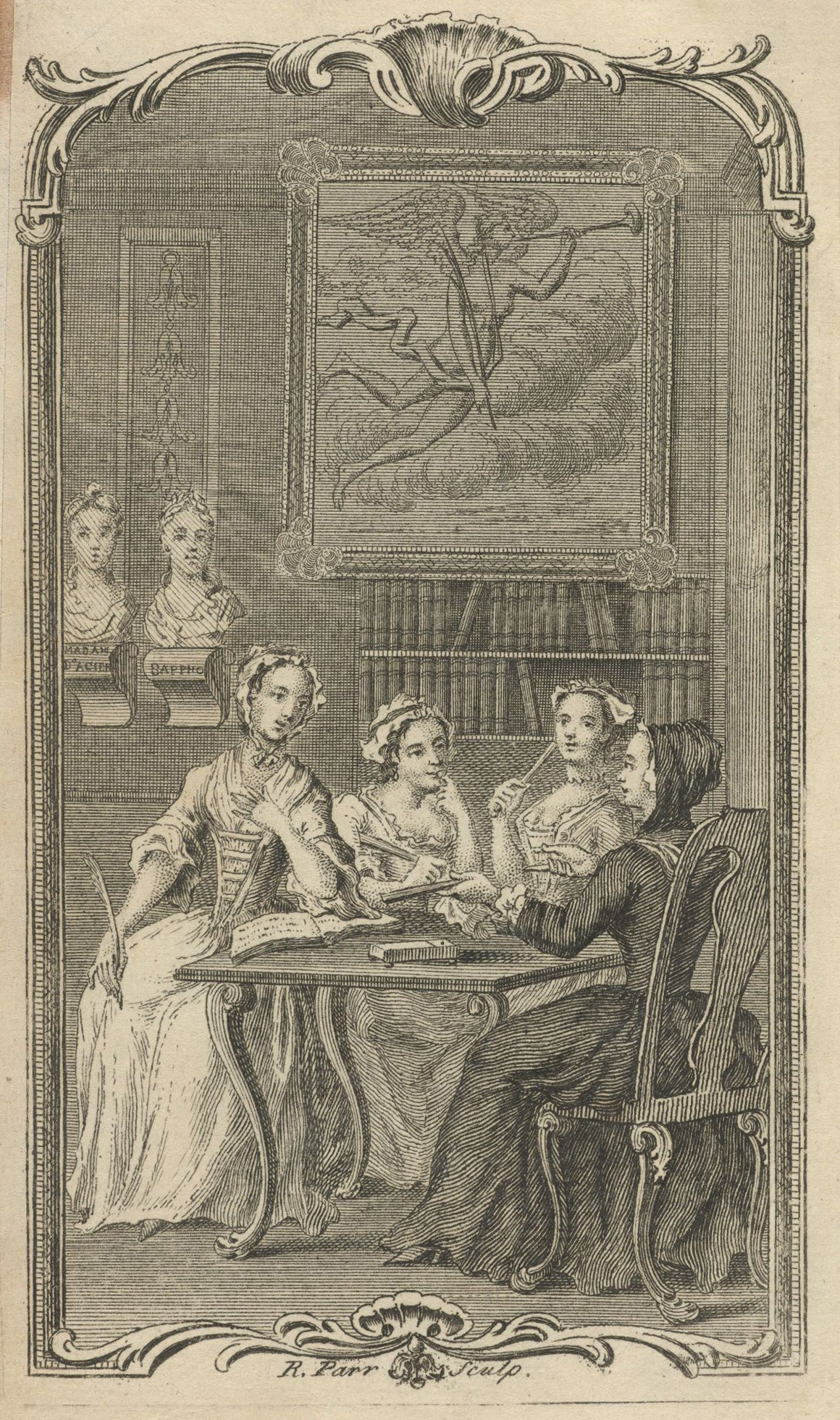
Frontispiece to The Female Spectator, Vol. 1

From April 1744 to May 1746 Eliza Haywood anonymously published The Female Spectator, a monthly periodical which was the first magazine by and for women. While discussing the arguments for and against attending theatre in The Female Spectator, Haywood references the Shakespeare Ladies’ Club's efforts to raise money for Shakespeare's memorial statue in Westminster Abbey as well as their work to see more of Shakespeare's plays produced:

Some ladies indeed have shewn a truly public Spirit in rescuing the admirable, yet almost forgotten Shakespear, from being totally sunk in oblivion:—they have generously contributed to raise a monument to his memory, and frequently honoured his works with their presence on the stage:—an action, which deserves the highest encomiums, and will be attended with an adequate reward; since, in the preserving the fame of the dead bard, they add a brightness to their own, which will shine to late posterity.

== Recognition in 2025 ==
Alerted to the historical oversight of the Shakespeare Ladies Club's campaign, in 2025 Westminster Abbey recognised their contribution.

'Westminster Abbey is officially recognising the central role played by The Shakespeare Ladies Club in reviving Shakespeare’s reputation and the campaign to erect a memorial to the writer in Poets’ Corner in 1741.

The Abbey has updated its website entry for the memorial to reflect that over time the women have been overlooked in favour of a committee of eminent men who liaised with the Abbey.

The change was recommended by the authors of a new book, The Shakespeare Ladies Club: The Forgotten Women Who Rescued the Bawdy Bard, by Christine and Jonathan Hainsworth, published by Amberley UK. They have written the first ever book devoted to The Shakespeare Ladies Club, a quartet of women who, outside pockets of academia, have been largely erased from popular culture.

The authors invited Professor Michael Dobson, Director of The Shakespeare Institute, Stratford-on-Avon, and North American scholar Genevieve Kirk, each of whom had also written on the club, to join them in creating a submission to the Abbey to explain the importance of The Shakespeare Ladies Club and their indispensable contribution to Shakespeare historiography.

The Abbey’s website entry for the Shakespeare memorial will now read:

'In modern times it has been largely forgotten that the impetus for memorialising Shakespeare in the eighteenth century came from a group of well-connected women, informally known as ‘the Shakespeare Ladies Club’. The most prominent members were: Susanna Ashley-Cooper, Countess of Shaftesbury; Mary, Duchess of Montagu; Mary Cowper, Baroness Walsingham; and Elizabeth Boyd, one of the earliest women to earn a living from her writing. They encouraged revivals of Shakespeare’s plays on the London stage, including two benefit performances given at the Drury Lane and Covent Garden theatres specifically to raise money for the Abbey memorial. 'The Ladies turned to four men to assist with obtaining permission for the statue and to arrange the necessary payments. They were Richard Boyle, Earl of Burlington, Dr Richard Mead, the poet Alexander Pope and the writer Benjamin Martyn (not, as sometimes suggested, the antiquary Tom Martin). As time has passed these men have come to receive the sole credit for the erection of Shakespeare’s memorial and the eighteenth-century revival in the popularity of Shakespeare’s plays has been attributed almost entirely to the actor David Garrick, with the crucial role of the Shakespeare Ladies Club in both enterprises being unjustly overlooked.'

== Known members ==
=== Susanna Ashley-Cooper, (nee Noel) The 4th Countess of Shaftesbury ===
Susanna Ashley-Cooper, The Countess of Shaftesbury, was "a well-known and highly regarded figure in London society." She was active in artistic circles and supported Handel. She was a patron of artists and artisans and a devotee of Shakespeare. She was raised by her mother Lady Gainsborough after her father's early death and was highly educated, progressive and 'enlightened'. She was the first wife of Anthony Ashley Cooper, 4th Earl of Shaftesbury and the daughter of Baptiste Noel, Earl of Gainsborough. Ashley-Cooper was identified as the leader of the Ladies’ Club by Thomas Cooke (author) in a poem published in 1743. The poem was titled An Epistle to the Right Honourable The Countess of Shaftesbury, with a Prologue and Epilogue on Shakespeare and his Writings. The prologue to the epistle was also performed by David Garrick at the Theatre Royal, Drury Lane.

=== Mary Montagu (nee Churchill) The 2nd Duchess of Montagu ===
Mary Montagu, Duchess of Montagu (1689–1751) is the most recently discovered member of the Shakespeare Ladies Club. Her activity within this group is confirmed by a laudatory verse written about her and her fellow club members by Francis Hawling, "An Ode: To her Grace the Dutchess of Montague And the Rest of the Illustrious Ladies of SHAKESPEAR'S Club". She was the youngest daughter of John Churchill, 1st Duke of Marlborough and Sarah Churchill, Duchess of Marlborough. She and husband John Montagu, 2nd Duke of Montagu moved in Patriot Whig circles and were devoted patrons of George Frideric Handel and various writers. John Montagu liberated Ignatius Sancho a young slave who served three sisters in Blackheath. Mary and John took Sancho into their family and social circle and Mary provided him with an education.

=== Elizabeth Boyd ===
Elizabeth Boyd (1727–1745) was an active writer during the first half of the eighteenth century. Her play, Don Sancho: or, The students whim…with Minerva’s triumph, a masque (1739), references the Ladies’ Club's plans "to erect Shakespeare’s statue as a bid to capture Shakespeare’s ghost." The play takes place in an Oxford College garden where Don Sancho conjures Shakespeare's ghost. Although Don Sancho was never performed it was given a reading in the green room of Drury Lane Theatre. In the play Boyd also expresses the Ladies’ Club's goal of seeing Shakespeare's plays replace Restoration comedies with inappropriate content: "And once again let Shakespear bless the Stage; / Soul-Soothing Shade, rouz’d by a Woman’s Pen, To Check the impious Rage of lawless Men."

=== Mary Cowper ===
The Mary Cowper who was the youngest member of the Shakespeare Ladies’ Club was the daughter of William Cowper Esq and Jane (nee Budgett). She was a great-niece of William Cowper, 1st Earl Cowper, and an elder cousin of the famous poet William Cowper. She married William de Grey, 1st Baron Walsingham in 1743. Mary Cowper recorded her involvement with the Shakespeare Ladies’ Club in a poem titled "On the Revival of Shakespear’s Plays by the Ladies in 1738," which was preserved in the Cowper Family Miscelany. The poem was reprinted in full in Michael Dobson's The Making of the National Poet. Mary Cowper was born into a family with a proud writing tradition. Her great-grandmother Sarah Cowper was a celebrated diarist, as was her great aunt Mary Cowper (nee Clavering). Her aunt was the poet Judith Madan (nee Cowper), who was a protegee of Alexander Pope who also mixed in the Shakespeare Ladies Club circles. In 2024 a bundle of letters once belonging to Mary Cowper was uncovered from the Norfolk Record Office by authors Christine and Jonathan Hainsworth. This collection included letters, poems, translations and prayers written by Cowper (later Lady Walsingham) and her 'circle'. Newly discovered was a previously unknown 'response' to Mary's poem on the Shakespeare Ladies Club written by her husband-to-be William de Grey along with a collection of proto-feminist poetry written by Mary Cowper. One poem reflects the tracts written by the unidentified Sophia, a Person of Quality in her response "To a Gentleman". The Shakespeare Ladies Club members are now considered viable candidates for "Sophia".
