= Sophia, a Person of Quality =

Pseudonymous English protofeminist

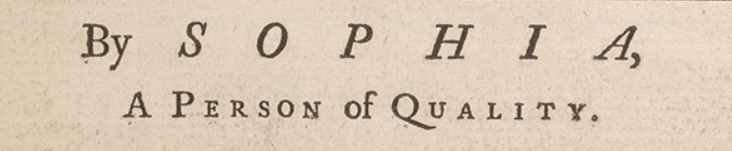
"By Sophia, a Person of Quality" on the cover of Woman Not Inferior to Man, 1739

"Sophia, a Person of Quality" was a pen name used by the author of two English protofeminist treatises published in the mid-18th century, following a period trend of women's histories and political tracts arguing in favor of equal rights known as the querelle des femmes. The first tract under the Sophia name, Woman Not Inferior to Man, was published in 1739. Largely adapting François Poullain de la Barre's 1676 De l'Égalité des deux sexes ('On the Equality of the Two Sexes'), Sophia expands on the text using Cartesian rhetoric to attack male superiority, with a focus on establishing the equality of women's abilities with men, as well as stating that women hold an inherent moral superiority. Following the publication in 1739 of an anonymous rebuttal tract, Man Superior to Woman, Sophia wrote a follow-up tract titled Woman's Superior Excellence Over Man. Published in 1740, the text accepts the rebuttal's challenge to prove the moral superiority of women in order to justify women's rights. All three of these tracts were later compiled and published as a single volume in 1751, entitled Beauty's Triumph.

The identity of Sophia remains uncertain and subject to scholarly dispute. Lady Mary Wortley Montagu and Sophia Fermor, the second wife of John Carteret, have both been proposed as the author of the tracts, although little evidence ties them to their creation. Alternate theories regarding the authorship of the tracts, such as their creation by a male author or two separate individuals, have also been proposed. Although older scholarship accused her of plagiarizing much of her work (Poullain was not attributed within the texts), she has been described as advancing many of the protofeminist concepts advocated by Poullain, and adapting the text with much more forceful and pointed language.

== Background ==
Following the English Civil War and the Glorious Revolution, the participation of women within political writing in Great Britain greatly increased. Many aristocratic women engaged in politics through their access to political figures in recreational and ceremonial contexts. A genre of women's history writing gained popularity during the period, often focusing on the biographies of "women worthies", historically renowned women such as Sappho and Joan of Arc. Additionally, a number of tracts advocating for greater social and political status of women begun to appear in the early 1700s, preempting the greater expansion of the early feminist movement in the latter portion of the century. Such positions were often referred to under the label of the querelle des femmes, Protofeminist writers such as Mary Astell and Mary Chudleigh published a number of such tracts in the late 17th and early 18th century, preempting the general expansion and development of feminist thought following the publication of Mary Wollstonecraft's 1792 Vindication of the Rights of Woman.

== Works ==
The "Sophia, a Person of Quality" moniker is used on two protofeminist treatises, the 1739 Woman Not Inferior to Man and the 1740 Woman's Superior Excellence Over Man, collectively referred to as the "Sophia pamphlets". Older scholarship interpreted Sophia's works as essentially a translation of French Cartesian philosopher François Poullain de la Barre's 1676 protofeminist tract, De l'Égalité des deux sexes ("On the Equality of the Two Sexes"), previously translated into English in 1677 under the title Woman as Good as the Man. Due to the large volume of shared text between the two tracts and De l'Égalité, a 1916 historical account described Sophia as a "rank impostor" and her plagiarism as "one of the cleverest hoaxes of her time." 56 paragraphs in Woman Not Inferior to Man and 54 in Woman's Superior Excellence Over Man are largely based on Poullain, without any attribution. Later scholarship has extended greater recognition to Sophia's adaptation of the text, noting significant expansion on Poullain's theories of gender equality, as well as a more confrontational writing style, embellishing the base text with the "violence of her vocabulary". Sophia has been described as significantly advancing and asserting protofeminist thought still undeveloped within the original work.

=== Woman Not Inferior to Man ===
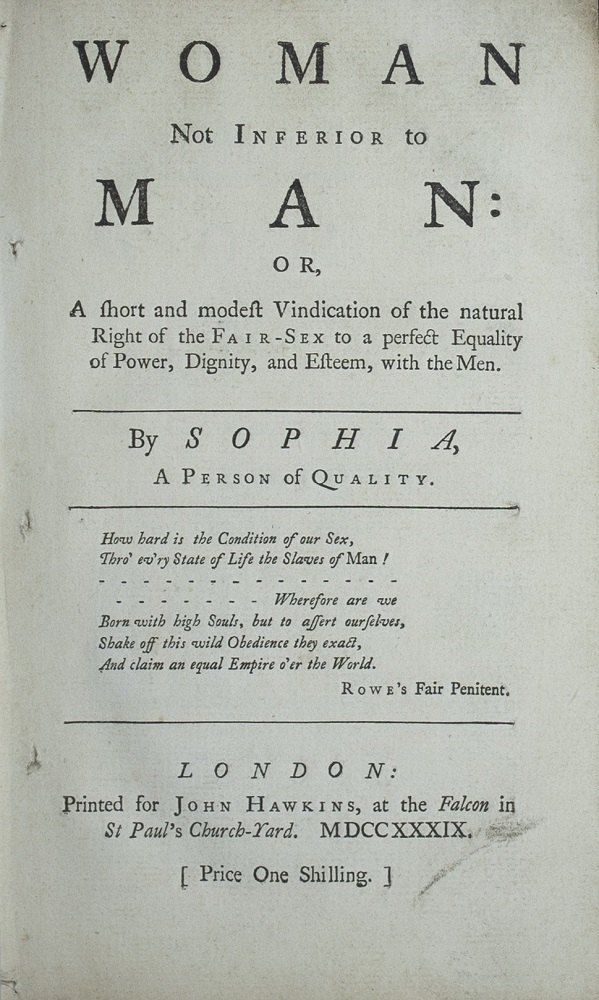
Cover of Woman Not Inferior to Man, 1739

The first tract authored by "Sophia, a Person of Quality" was published in 1739 by John Hawkins, a London-based book publisher, and sold for a price of one shilling. Fully titled Woman Not Inferior to Man: A Short and Modest Vindication of the Natural Right of the Fair-Sex to a Perfect Equality of Power, Dignity, and Esteem, with the Men, the work forms a critique of male superiority and dominance over women, and argues that women are just as, if not significantly more, suited for essentially any public office or position of authority usually occupied by men. Sophia uses both Lockean and Cartesian rhetoric to attack male superiority. Largely adhering to Poullain's Cartesianism and its mind–body dualism, she raises that men and women share fundamentally identical minds despite differences that exist in body. Lockean political rhetoric, with its focus on critiquing tyrannical systems, is used to paint male dominance as irrational, and as an unjustified and arbitrary tyranny. However, Sophia also posits that women hold an inherent moral superiority over men. She notes that relatively little physical distinction exists between men and women, with women denied advanced positions in society purely through men's prejudice. According to Sophia, when women had historically been given the opportunity to take leadership, such as the case of female sovereigns or rarely military commanders, they proved their abilities as equal to men. Any perceived lack of intelligence by women was mainly due to an absence of educational opportunities:

Why is learning useless to us? Because we have no share in public offices. And why have we no share in public offices? Because we have no learning.

While largely adapted from Poullain's De l'Égalité, Sophia's text significantly expands on some portions of the work, adding quotations from English figures such as Nicholas Rowe and Alexander Pope. Sophia's adaptation of the text, described as "highly personal [and] disarmingly frank", creates a significantly increased focus on male position within present society, to the expense of Poullain's focus on the historical trajectory of gender. Unlike Poullain, she frequently speaks of the inherent generosity of women and the "ungenerous nature" of men, and uses significantly more intense and pointed language, such as variably describing male dominance over women as slavery, tyranny, and "lawless usurpation". A greater focus on the dignity of women is a persistent theme across the text. However, modern scholarly analysis has critiqued Sophia as failing to develop many of Poullain's ideas, as well as her exclusion of Poullain's arguments against all arbitrary power more broadly.

=== Woman's Superior Excellence Over Man ===
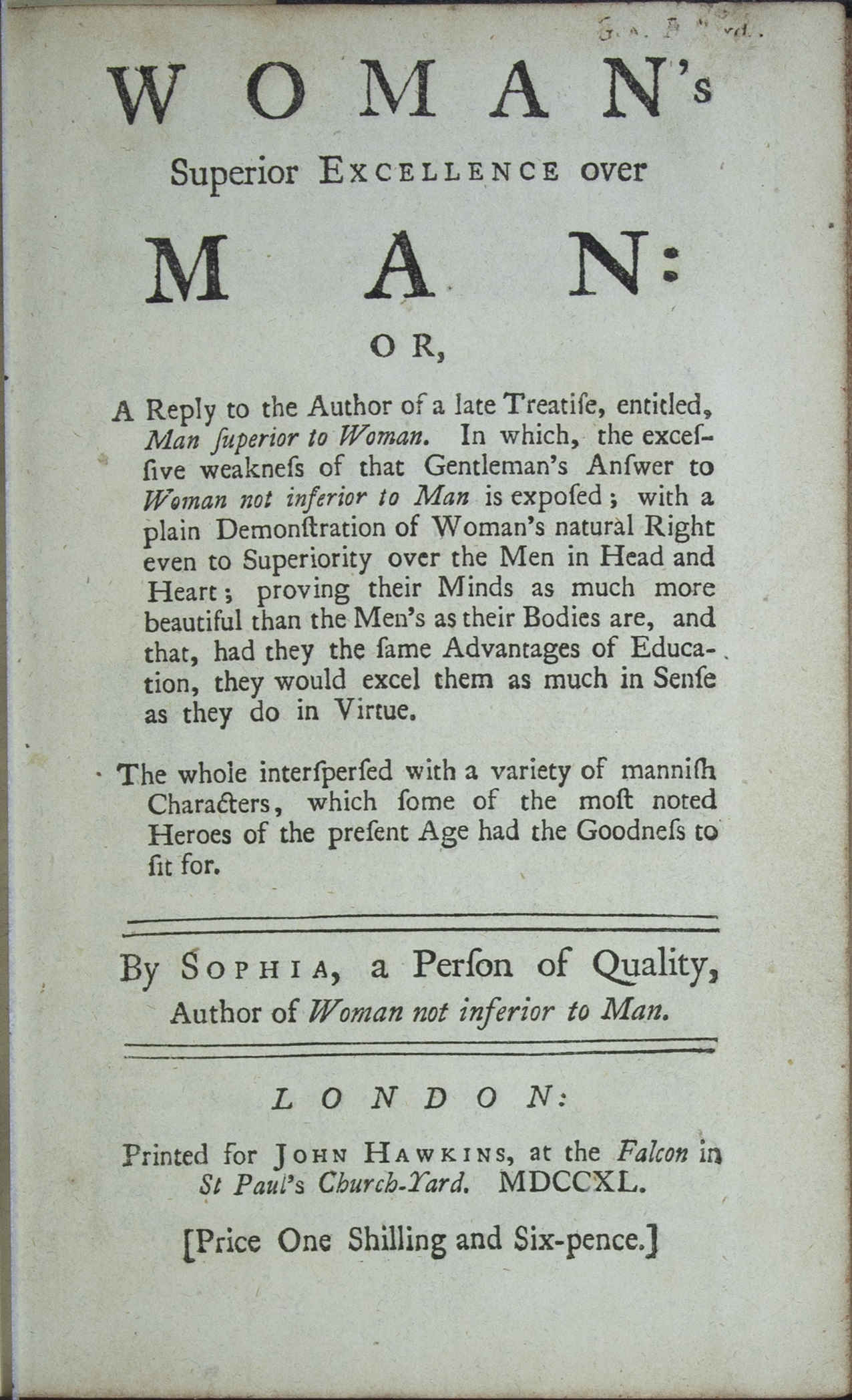
Cover of Woman's Superior Excellence Over Man, 1740

Within the year of the publication of Woman Not Inferior to Man, an anonymous rebuttal (the pamphlet credited to simply "a Gentleman") was published in response, entitled Man Superior to Woman: A Vindication of Man's Natural Right of Sovereign Authority Over the Woman. Like Sophia's previous tract, it was published by John Hawkins in London. The tract argued that women could not claim equality unless they could prove that they were superior to men. Sophia accepted the anonymous challenge in a tract published the following year, Woman's Superior Excellence Over Man. (Note: Fully titled Woman's Superior Excellence over Man: or, A reply to the author of a late treatise, entitled, Man Superior to Woman. In which, the excessive weakness of that Gentleman's answer to Woman not Inferior to Man is exposed; with a plain demonstration of woman's natural right even to superiority over the men in head and heart; proving their minds as much more beautiful than the men's as their bodies are, and that, had they the same advantages of education, they would excel them as much in sense as they do in virtue. The whole interspersed with a variety of mannish characters, which some of the most noted heroes of the present age had the goodness to sit for.)

The gentleman, my antagonist, is so weak as to dispute our equality with the Men, till we can shew a superiority over them; I think it but a justice due to my injured sex to accept of his challenge, and to prove, what is matter of fact, that Woman-kind are not only by nature equal, but far superior to the Men.

Like Poullain, Sophia drew on the lives of the famed historical "woman worthies" in some of her arguments, while also including more contemporary women into this category, such as Elizabeth Singer Rowe and Anne Finch. Sophia described the historical record of women as itself disproving claims of male dominance. A consistent claim made throughout the text is that men exercise tyranny over and enslave women, tapping into the popular anti-tyranny discourse of the period in Britain, such as the work of John Locke. Sophia argues that men achieved this position of tyrannical dominance through "fraud and violence", and while they maintain this position through brute force, women continue to hold the moral superiority and right to reassert dominance. Although rejecting any sort of violent or coerced overthrow of male power, Sophia advocates for women to claim a peaceful "right to re-entry" into power due to their superiority of virtue.

=== Later republications ===
Both of the Sophia tracts, alongside the anonymous Man Superior to Woman, were republished and sold by J. Robinson in the 1751 compilation Beauty's Triumph: Or, The Superiority of the Fair Sex Invincibly Proved. The revised version of Woman Not Inferior to Man included within the compilation features an expanded list of historically notable women. In this edition, Sophia writes that she wished to write a "a parallel history of the most eminent persons of both sexes in past ages, for virtue or vice", although this proposed work was never published.

== Identity ==
My Letters shall plague you with as much Constancy as a Quotidian Ague till you give me some Information about the Author of the pamphlet I mentioned in my 2 last.

— Elizabeth Carter, letter to Edward Cave inquiring on the identity of Sophia, December 1739

The identity of "Sophia" remains unknown, although both contemporary and modern sources have proposed possible identifications. Anonymous publication was extremely common in the 18th century, with many prominent authors initially publishing anonymously early in their careers or in the first edition of their texts. Over 80% of novels in the mid-to-late 18th century were published anonymously. The only identifying information given by Sophia is her gender and elevated social status, a guardian referred to as Honorio, a writing master known as Claudio, and her self-description as a "young lady".

Lady Mary Wortley Montagu has been proposed as a candidate, although she was in her 50s by the publication of the tracts. Further discrediting this theory is Sophia's expressed distaste for Gilbert Burnet, a figure admired by Montagu. Sophia Fermor, the second wife of John Carteret, 2nd Earl Granville, has also been proposed, although little ties her to the tracts beyond the name Sophia. The theory that Sophia may have been a man has been proposed, as well as the possibility that Woman Not Inferior to Man and Woman's Superior Excellence Over Man were actually written by different individuals, despite the shared pen name.

== Legacy ==
Another pamphlet largely translating Poullain's work, Female Rights Vindicated; or the Equality of the Sexes Morally and Physically Proved, was published anonymously in 1758. In a lengthy preface, the text reuses many of Sophia's tactics, including drawing on historical women to prove female equality to men. This tract was republished in 1780 under the name Female Restoration, by a Moral and Physical Vindication of Female Talents.
