= Bartolomeo Goggio =

Bartolomeo Goggio (Italian pronunciation: [bartoloˈmɛːo ˈɡɔddʒo]; also Bartolommeo for the given name and Goggi, Gogio or Gogo for the surname; c. 1430 in Ferrara – after 1493) was an Italian writer and notary.

He is most recognized for De laudibus mulierum [On the Merits of Women], written in the late 1480s, which was dedicated to Eleanor of Naples, Duchess of Ferrara. Only one surviving manuscript of the work, held at the British Library, is known to exist. For De laudibus mulierum, Goggio is recognized as a contributor to the "pro-woman" side of the querelle des femmes – "a debate about the nature and worth of women that unfolded in Europe from the medieval to the early modern period"; in it, he argues for the superiority of women. After Eleanor's death in 1493, Goggio wrote another philosophical work, De nobilitate humani animi opus [A Work on the Nobility of the Human Mind].
