= Virginia Cox =

British professor of Italian Literature, essayist, literary critic

- Born: 30 November 1962 (age 63)
- Education: University of Cambridge
- Occupations: British scholar of Italian literature, culture and history
- Writing career
- Notable awards: Fellow of the British Academy (2022)

Virginia Cox, FBA (born 30 November 1962) is a British scholar of Italian literature, culture and history. She is best known for her research on Renaissance and Counter-Reformation Italian literature, the reception of classical rhetorical theory in Italy between the 13th and 16th centuries and Italian early modern women's writing.

== Early life and education ==
From 1981 to 1985, she studied modern and medieval languages (Italian and Spanish) at the University of Cambridge, graduating with a Bachelor of Arts (BA) degree. She remained at Cambridge to undertake a Doctor of Philosophy (PhD) degree in Italian, which she completed in 1990.

== Career ==
Cox completed her PhD at the University of Cambridge in 1990. She has taught at the University of Edinburgh (1989-91), University College London (1991-92), the University of Cambridge (1992-2002), and New York University (2003-2021).

Since 2021, she has held the posts of Honorary Professor of Early Modern Italian Literature and Culture in the Department of Italian at Cambridge, and Senior Research Fellow at Trinity College, Cambridge.

== Honors and awards ==
Cox has received book awards from the Society for the Study of Early Modern Women in 2005, 2009, and 2012 and the American Association of Publishers in 2008, and article awards from the International Society for the History of Rhetoric (Rhetorica prize) in 2017 and the Renaissance Society of America (Nelson Prize) in 1996, 2004, and 2017.

She appeared in the 75th anniversary edition of Renaissance Quarterly.

In 2022, she was elected a Fellow of the British Academy (FBA), the United Kingdom's national academy for the humanities and social sciences.

== Selected works ==
=== Monographs ===
- Cox, Virginia (1992). The Renaissance Dialogue: Literary Dialogue in its Social and Political Contexts, Castiglione to Galileo. Cambridge: Cambridge University Press. ISBN 978-0-511-89571-5.
- Cox, Virginia (2008). Women's Writing in Italy, 1400–1650. Baltimore, MD: Johns Hopkins University Press. ISBN 978-0-8018-8819-9.
- Cox, Virginia (2011). The Prodigious Muse: Women's Writing in Counter-Reformation Italy. Baltimore: Johns Hopkins University Press. ISBN 978-1-4214-0160-7.
- Cox, Virginia (2013). Lyric Poetry by Women of the Italian Renaissance. Baltimore, MD: The Johns Hopkins University Press. ISBN 978-1-4214-0887-3.
- Cox, Virginia (2015). A Short History of the Italian Renaissance. London: I.B. Tauris. ISBN 978-0-85772-974-3.

=== Edited books ===
- The Rhetoric of Cicero in its Medieval and Renaissance Traditions. Edited by Virginia Cox and John O. Ward. Leiden: Brill, 2006. ISBN 978-90-474-0464-4
- A Cultural History of Democracy in the Renaissance. Edited by Virginia Cox and Joanne Paul. Volume 3 of A Cultural History of Democracy. Edited by Eugenio F. Biagini. London: Bloomsbury Academic, 2021. ISBN 978-1-350-04293-3
- Vittoria Colonna: Poetry, Religion, Art, Impact. Edited by Virginia Cox and Shannon McHugh. Amsterdam: Amsterdam University Press, 2021. ISBN 978-94-6372-394-7.

=== Editions of texts ===
- Fonte, Moderata (1997). The Worth of Women: Wherein Is Clearly Revealed Their Nobility and Their Superiority to Men. The Other Voice in Early Modern Europe. Translated by Virginia Cox. Chicago, IL: University of Chicago Press. ISBN 978-0-226-25682-5.
- Campiglia, Maddalena (2004). Flori, a Pastoral Drama. Edited by Virginia Cox and Lisa Sampson; translation by Virginia Cox. Chicago: University of Chicago Press. ISBN 978-0-226-09224-9.
- Fonte, Moderata (2018). The Merits of Women: Wherein Is Revealed Their Nobility and Their Superiority to Men. Translated by Virginia Cox. Chicago, IL: University of Chicago Press. ISBN 978-0-226-55077-0.
