= The Worth of Women =

1600 dialogue by Moderata Fonte

The Worth of Women: Wherein is Clearly Revealed Their Nobility and Their Superiority to Men
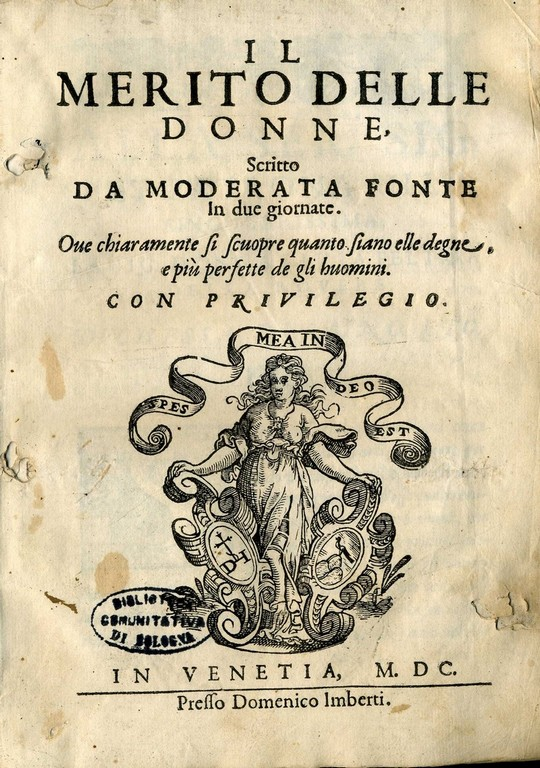
- 1600 cover of Il merito delle donne illustrated by Domenico Imberti
- Author: Moderata Fonte
- Original title: Il merito della donne
- Language: Italian
- Published: 1600
- Media type: Print

Il merito delle donne, most commonly translated The Worth of Women: Wherein is Clearly Revealed Their Nobility and Their Superiority to Men, is a dialogue by Moderata Fonte first published posthumously in 1600. The work is a dialogue between seven Venetian women discussing the worth of women and the differences between the sexes more generally. The title has also been translated The Merits of Women.

== Plot ==
The Worth of Women depicts a dialogue between seven Venetian noblewomen over the course of two days. On the first day, the women debate whether men are good or bad and also discuss the dignity of women. On the second day, they discuss an overview of general knowledge of natural history and culture but also return to their discussion of the sexes. Both days also contain critiques and discussions of marriage and dowries.

== Characters ==
Adriana - an old widow

Virginia - young and unmarried, Adriana's daughter

Leonora - a young widow

Lucretia - an older married woman

Cornelia - a young, married woman

Corinna - a young "dimmessa" (Note: Virginia Cox describes the difficulties in interpreting this term in a footnote in her 1997 translation. She writes "The noun dimmessa in this period (more usually spelled dimessa) most often indicated a member of a female tertiary order started by Padre Antonio Pagani in Vicenza in 1579 . . . There is some evidence, however, that the term was used more loosely to indicate any respectable unmarried girl living at home, rather than in a convent.")

Helena - a young woman, recently married

== Development ==
According to Fonte's biographer, Fonte completed The Worth of Women just before her death in 1592. One of Fonte's daughters claimed that Fonte finished The Worth of Women "the very day before her death in childbirth".

The Worth of Women was highly influenced by The Decameron, a work that Fonte often alludes to in the text. Fonte's work also quotes directly and indirectly from both Petrarch's "Sonnet 263" and Orlando Furioso. The dialogue style of Fonte's work was influenced by Baldassare Castiglione and Pietro Bembo.

Virginia Cox claims that the work was influenced by the changing economy of Italy in the late sixteenth-century. This period was characterized by a reduction in marriage prospects for Venetian noble women leading to an increase in the numbers of women entering convents. However, this increase in the number of women in convents meant that it became increasingly expensive for women to become nuns. Many families were then unable to send their unwed daughters to convents which led to what Cox describes as the introduction of the "virtually unprecedented figure of the secular spinster". Cox argues that these unprecedented numbers of spinsters and nuns forced women in late sixteenth-century Venice to become more aware of their vulnerability and powerlessness and thus influenced Fonte's arguments surrounding women's dowries in The Worth of Women.

=== Publication history ===
The Worth of Women was first published in 1600. The first edition was prefaced by a biography of Fonte written by Giovanni Nicolò Doglioni. It is unclear what, if any, changes Doglioni made to the text before its publication. The text was accompanied by a dedication from Fonte's daughter, Cecilia Zorzi, to Livia della Rovera who was 14 at the time of publication. The book received a second printing in 1603.

Virginia Cox's English translation of Il merito della donne, The Worth of Women, was first published by the University of Chicago Press in 1997 as part of their Other Voice in Early Modern Europe series. In 2018, the University of Chicago Press published Cox's translation under the title The Merits of Women. The 2018 edition omitted most of the scholarly footnotes and appendices published with the earlier version in an attempt to encourage a broader audience to read the text. The Merits of Women also featured a newly translated introduction from Dacia Mariani.

== Analysis ==
Adriana Chemello, Paola Malpezzi Prize, and Margaret King have all claimed that Corinna, of all the women in the dialogue, comes the closest to representing Fonte's own views and character.

=== Biblical commentary ===
Amanda W. Benckhuysen describes Fonte as presenting a "pro-woman reading of Eve" in The Worth of Women. Fonte acknowledges that man (Adam) was created before woman in Christianity, but claims that this supports the superiority of women. Eve was created as a helper to Adam, which Fonte claims demonstrates the incompleteness and inferiority of men. Fonte also sees Adam's sin as being worse than Eve's. Benckhuysen thus claims that the social hierarchy which places men above women has no basis in the Bible.

=== Friendship ===
Carolyn James claims that Fonte's depiction of ideal friendship in The Worth of Women is Ciceronian. However, James finds that Fonte departs from Cicero in that she claims that men, rather than women, lack "amicitia", the essential virtue of friendship. Unlike her contemporaries, Fonte presents friendship as a female phenomenon.

== Reception ==
The Worth of Women is seen as a part of the Renaissance 'querelle des femmes'.

== Adaptations ==
Kairos Italy Theater's adaptation of The Worth of Women made its United States' premiere in spring 2017 as part of Carnegie Hall's "La Serenissima" festival. The text was translated by Virginia Cox and the production was directed by Jay Stern in collaboration with Laura Caparrotti. The show featured music by composer Erato Kremmyda and lyricist Maggie-Kate Coleman. The cast was Carlotta Brentan, Laura Caparrotti, Tali Custer, Aileen Lanni, Marta Mondelli, Irene Turri, and Annie Watkins. In October 2019, KIT-Kairos Italy Theater re-staged their adaptation.
