= Elizabeth Boyd =

English writer and poet

- Born: 1710
- Died: 1745 (aged 34–35)
- Occupations: Writer, poet
- Writing career
- Pen name: Louisa or Eloisa
- Language: English
- Years active: 1727-1745

Elizabeth Boyd (c. 1710 – 1745) was an English writer and poet who supported her family by writing novels, poetry, a play, and a periodical. She also wrote under the noms de plume Louisa or Eloisa. Boyd is one of three known members of the Shakespeare Ladies Club.

== Life and work ==
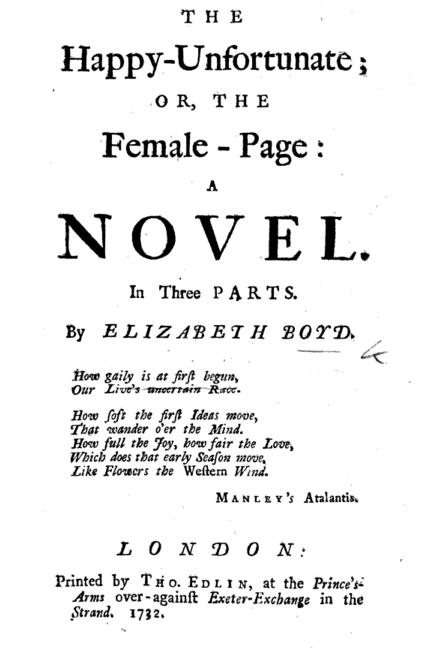
Title-page to Elizabeth Boyd's novel of 1732

Little is known of her birth or career. From her writings it can be gleaned that she came from a large family who had supported the Stuart cause. Her father enjoyed Stuart favour, her mother is said to have been worn down by the care of many children. It was to support her ailing mother that she took up writing. The subscription lists to her work contain many aristocrats which suggests the family had been well connected but had fallen on hard times.

She first published poetry under the name of Louisa, Variety:A Poem (1727) and Verses on the King's Birthday (1730). Her first major work was a novel entitled The Happy Unfortunate; Or The female page. This appeared in 1732 and was reprinted in 1737. It is a masquerade romance in which the lead female characters hide behind masks for most of the story. With money from this she set up a stationers shop in George Court, Princes Street, London, near Leicester Fields

The Humorous Miscellany of 1733 contains her best known poem On the Death of an Infant of five Days old; being a beautiful but abortive Birth. She wrote a play Don Sancho, Or The Students Whim, (1739), which was never performed. However, Don Sancho was given a reading in the green room of Theatre Royal, Drury Lane. Don Sancho takes place in an Oxford College garden and features the ghosts of William Shakespeare and John Dryden. At the end of the play, after the ghosts return to the afterlife, Minerva creates a monument to Shakespeare; this ending is why many Shakespearean scholars believe Boyd was involved in the Shakespeare Ladies Club and, specifically, the club's fundraising efforts for the Shakespeare memorial statue in Poet's Corner in Westminster Abbey.

The Snail: Or the Lady's Lucubrations (1745) was an ambitious project to produce a regular periodical aimed at aristocratic Ladies. Only one volume was produced and there is an indication in her writing that her health was failing. It contains veiled attacks on the Duke and Duchess of Marlborough, who twenty years previously had engaged in Jacobite intrigue but had abandoned their support in favour of what many saw as their own career advancement.

== Bibliography ==
=== Novels ===
- The Happy-Unfortunate; Or, the Female-Page: a Novel, Etc

=== Periodicals ===
- The Snail: Or The Lady's Lucubrations. Being entertaining letters between a lady at St. James's, and her friend at Dover, on new and curious subjects

=== Plays ===
- Don Sancho, Or The Students Whim

=== Poems ===
- On the Death of an Infant of five Days old; being a beautiful but abortive Birth
- Truth, a poem : Address'd to the Right Honourable William Lord Harrington
- Variety: A Poem, 1727
- Verses Congratulatory, on the Happy Marriage of the Right Honourable the Lady Diana Spencer with the Lord John Russel
- The humorous miscellany; or, riddles for the beaux. Humbly inscribed to the ... Earl of Cardigan
