= Moderata Fonte =

Venetian writer and poet (1555–1592)

Modesta di Pozzo di Forzi
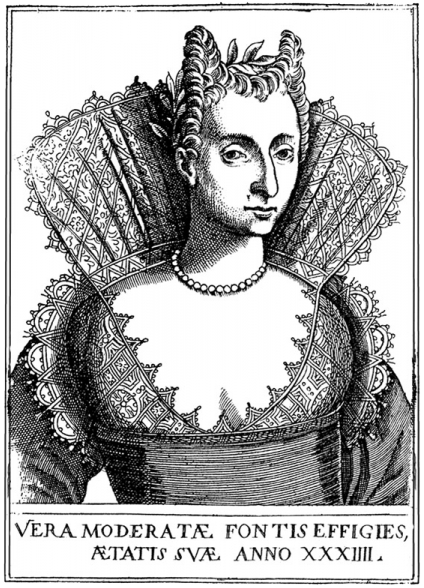
- Born: June 15, 1555
- Died: November 2, 1592
- Writing career
- Pen name: Moderata Fonte
- Language: Italian
- Period: 16th century
- Subject: Feminism
- Notable work: The Worth of Women

Moderata Fonte, directly translating to 'Moderate Well', is a pseudonym of Modesta di Pozzo di Forzi (or Zorzi), also known as Modesto Pozzo (or Modesta, feminization of Modesto), (1555–1592) a Venetian writer and poet. Besides the posthumously-published dialogues, Giustizia delle donne and Il merito delle donne (gathered in The Worth of Women, 1600), for which she is best known, she wrote a romance and religious poetry. Details of her life are known from the biography by Giovanni Niccolò Doglioni (1548-1629), her uncle, included as a preface to the dialogue.

== Life and history ==
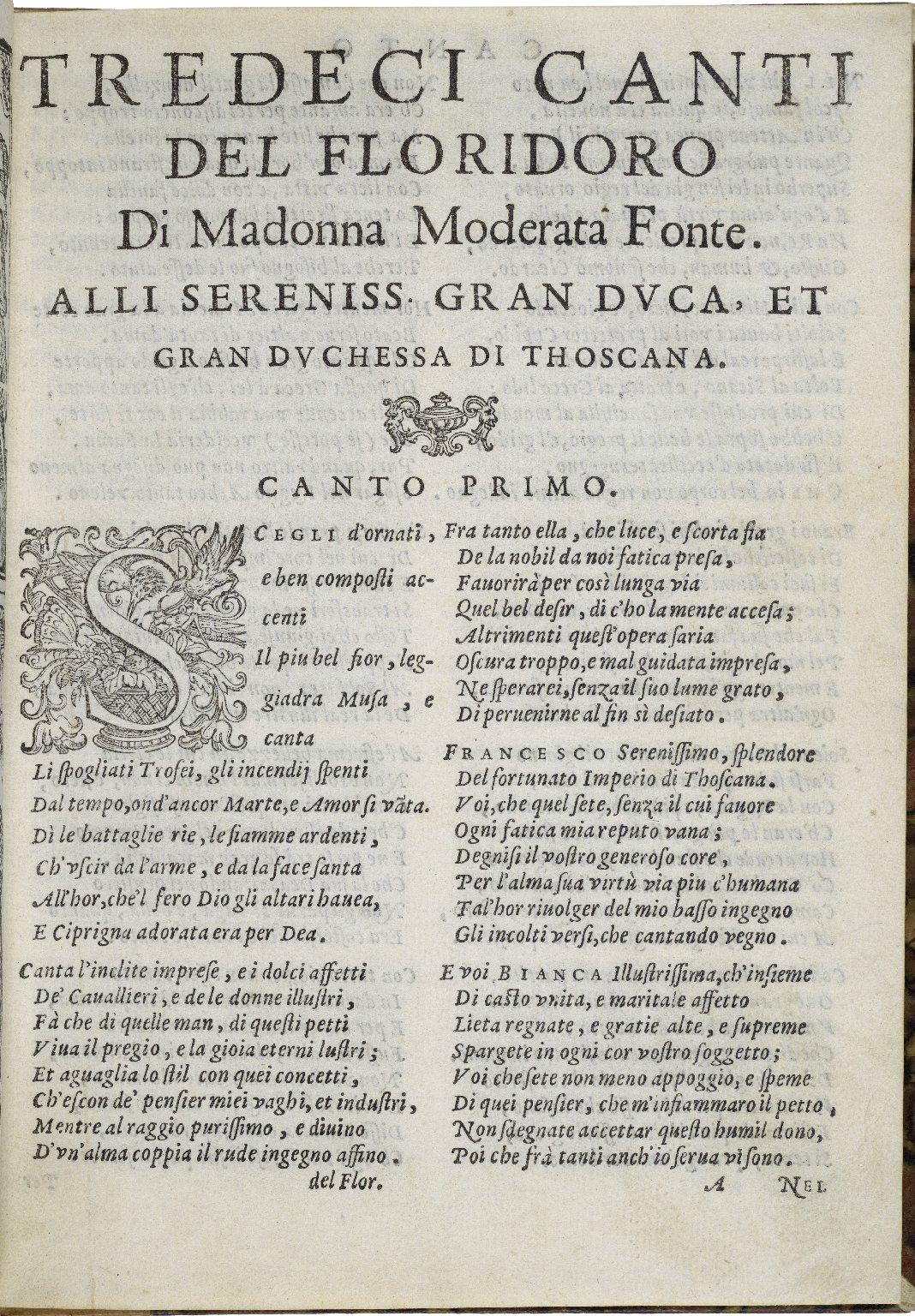
An early page in a 1581 edition of Fonte's poetry.

Pozzo's parents, Girolamo da Pozzo and Marietta da Pozzo (née dal Moro), died of the plague in 1556, when she was just a year old, and she and her older brother Leonardo were placed in the care of their maternal grandmother and her second husband. She spent several years in the convent of Santa Marta where, thanks to her extraordinary memory, she was often displayed as a child prodigy. She was able to repeat long sermons she had heard or read only once. At the age of nine she was returned to her grandmother's family where she learned Latin and composition from her grandfather, Prospero Saraceni, a man of letters, as well as from her brother, Leonardo. Her brother also taught her to read and write in Latin, draw, sing, and play the lute and harpsichord. She, in addition, had informally continued her education under the guidance of Saraceni by running his library. From 1576, in her early twenties, she would continue to have a relationship with the Saracenis as she went to go stay with their daughter, Saracena.

On 15 February 1582, at twenty-seven years old, Moderata wed lawyer and government official Filippo de’ Zorzi with whom she would later have four children. They had two sons, Pietro, who was the oldest and Girolamo, the third born. They also had two daughters, the second born Cecilia and the youngest whose name was never released. Their marriage seemed to reflect equality and mutual respect as evidenced by de’ Zorzi returning her dowry a year and a half after their wedding. An official document dated October 1583 states that de’ Zorzi returns the dowry thanks to his pure kindness and to the great love and good will that he has felt and feels for her. Likewise, Moderata Fonte describes her husband in one of her writings as a man of virtue, goodness and integrity.

These actions were significant in this time period, since women did not typically have property under their own name with which they could govern.

== Works ==
One of Fonte's first known works is a musical play performed before the Doge Da Ponte in 1581 at the festival of St. Stephen's Day. Le Feste [The Feasts] includes about 350 verses with several singing parts. Also in 1581, she published her epic poem I tredici canti del Floridoro [The Thirteen Cantos of Floridoro] dedicated to Bianca Cappello and her new husband, Francesco I de' Medici, the Grand Duke of Tuscany. This poem is the second chivalric work published by an Italian woman, after Tullia d’Aragona's Il Meschino, which appeared in 1560.

Fonte wrote two religious poems, La Passione di Cristo [Christ's Passion] and La Resurrezione di Gesù Cristo nostro Signore che segue alla Santissima Passione in otava rima da Moderata Fonte [The Resurrection of Jesus Christ, our Lord, which follows the Holy Passion in octaves by Moderata Fonte]. In these works she describes in detail the emotional reactions of the Virgin Mary and Mary Magdalen to Christ's death and resurrection, illustrating her deep belief in the active participation of women in the events of the Passion and Resurrection of Christ.

She is perhaps best known for a composition that she worked on from the years 1588 to 1592 called Il Merito delle donne [On The Merit of Women], published posthumously in 1600, in which she criticizes the treatment of women by men while celebrating women's virtues and intelligence and arguing that women are superior to men, but does not go as far as to appeal for sexual equality.

When she died in 1592 at the age of thirty-seven, Pozzo had four children according to Doglioni: the oldest aged ten years, the second aged eight, the third aged six and the newborn, whose birth caused her death. Her husband placed a marble epitaph on her tomb which describes Pozzo as ‘femina doctissima’ [a very learned woman].

=== Giustizia delle donne (The Worth of Women: Wherein is Clearly Revealed Their Nobility and Their Superiority to Men) ===
Giustizia delle donne was published after Fonte's death along with Il merito delle donne. Both literary works are influenced by Boccaccio's Decameron: they are frame stories where the characters develop their dialogues and exempla.

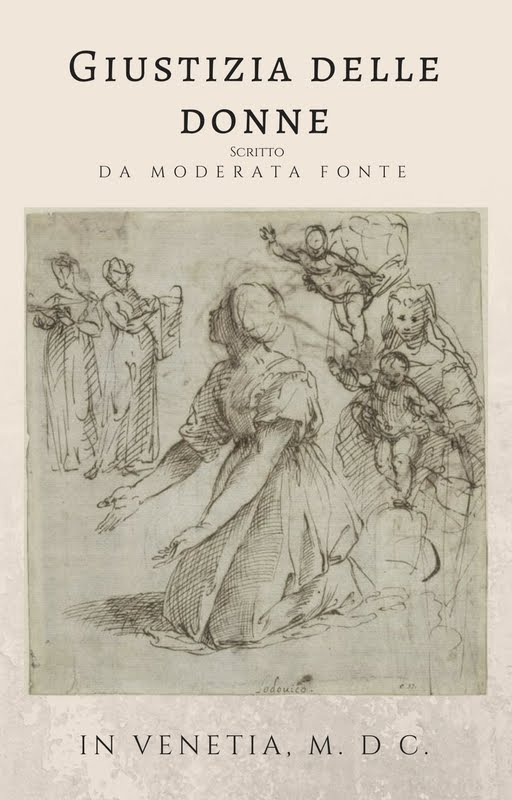

A group of women are talking in a Venetian garden when Pasquale arrives and breaks the relaxed atmosphere by referring to the last argument she has had with her husband. It leads to an inspiring conversation about "masculine behaviour" in which they complain about the unfair situations they have to face every day; they imagine twelve punishments (one per month) in order to raise awareness among men of the female plight. The punishments would require men to suffer public humiliation, become self-sacrificing parents, and live isolated from their friends and family. The most remarkable punishment is the one dedicated to silence: only women would have a voice, and that voice would allow them to finally speak and organize society.

Fonte frequently used irony, paradox, and address to the reader. She was influenced by the rhythm of Plato's dialogues.

The book is divided in 14 chapters: the first one works as an introduction or frame, the next twelve cover punishments and attacks to the masculine figure and in the last one they return to real life after their imaginary trip wiser and filled with hope.

== Themes and outcomes ==
=== Impact and contemporaries ===
Women's speech in Renaissance literature often required the absence of men. Literary dialogues often silenced or excluded women, but in The Worth of Women men are excluded. In the dialogues the worth of women is not questioned, but rather the worth of men is put on trial in their garden debate. The second part of Fonte's explicated her beliefs about the necessity of intellectual understanding and feminized friendship. The importance on female communities is an exhortation for women to realize their dignity and become politically autonomous individuals. This is reflective of Laura Cereta's idea of the 'Republic of Women'. The women in the dialog never come to a conclusion, and the space to speak freely is temporary and borrowed. The women in the end have to leave the garden to return home. The garden setting displays the potential feminized society as all of Fonte's characters express the moral capacity of women and their deserving of material means to be autonomous, though from different arguments.

=== Legacy and influence ===
Fonte was a transgressive author that influenced modern thinking and understanding of feminism in historical context. Her manuscript was published after her death, as she finished completing her writings on the day before she died giving birth to her fourth child. The themes of Moderata Fonte's works are literary spaces of reevaluation. One of the larger themes are love, freedom of speech and the worth of women. Some authors have suggested that Moderata Fonte's last work, along with other contemporaries like Lucrezia Marinella, were meant to be a critic against Giuseppe Passi's, I donneschi difetti [Women's Defects].

Before the publications of Moderata Fonte's and Lucrezia Marinella's works, men were the only authors of writings in defense of women, with the exception of Laura Cereta's letters, which circulated as a manuscript from 1488 to 1492 among humanists in Brescia, Verona, and Venice. Their personality greatly influenced the creation of the character of Isabella in the Pazzia di Isabella by Isabella Andreini and her husband Francesco, who revitalized the querelles des femmes through the vernacular performances of the commedia dell'arte. The protofeminist perspective that is developed in these literary works highlights the role of property in the devaluation of women.

The rediscovery of her work in the 20th century is due to scholar women from Italy and America such as Eleonora Carinci, Adriana Chemello, Marina Zancan and Virginia Cox. According to Cox and Finucci, Fonte argues that gendered differences are nurtured and cultural, rather than inherent to female biology. Patricia Labalme and Cox highlight the emergence of an early feminist critique of misogyny in her writings. Diana Robin writes on the integrated role of men, women and their relationships in this movement of recognizing the woman as an intellectual. Fonte became very cited in other works of commentary on women including Pietro Paolo di Ribera and Cristofano Bronzini.
