= Marguerite Buffet =

French writer (died 1680)

Marguerite Buffet (died 1680) was a French writer, grammarian, and teacher. Buffet is recognized for her contribution to the pro-woman side of the querelle des femmes – " a debate about the nature and worth of women that unfolded in Europe from the medieval to the early modern period." Her "only extant work", published in 1668, "is the Nouvelles observations sur la langue françoise, Où il est traitté des termes anciens & inusitez, & du bel usage des mots nouveaux. Avec les Éloges des Illustres Sçavantes, tant Anciennes que Modernes (New Observations on the French Language, in which Ancient and Unusual Terms are Discussed, and the Appropriate Use of New Words. With Praises of Illustrious Learned Women, both Ancient and Modern)". Buffet was inspired by Augustine, and believed that men and women are equal when it comes to Christian salvation, their souls, and their organs, but argues that women's physiology, intellectualism, and morality is superior.
