= Female superiority =

Belief that women are superior to men

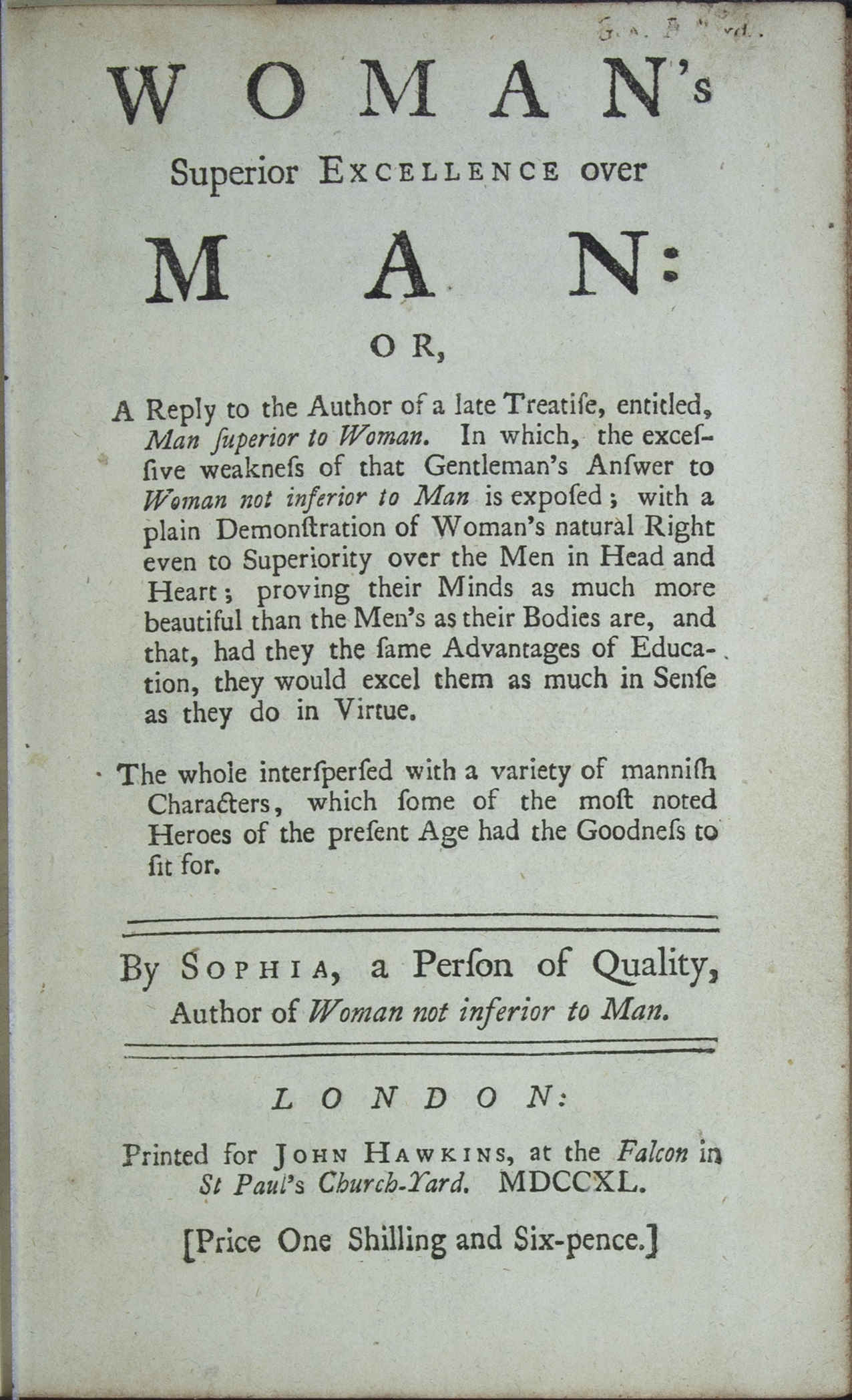
Cover of Woman's Superior Excellence Over Man by Sophia, a Person of Quality, 1740

The belief in female superiority, that women are superior to men, was present in Renaissance literature and the early modern period. It was also a part of second-wave feminist arguments.

== History ==
=== Early modern period ===
The belief that women are superior goes back to protofeminism.

Other notable examples include The Nobility and Excellence of Women and the Defects and Vices of Men by Lucrezia Marinella in 1601 and In Praise of Illustrious Learned Women, both Ancient and Modern by Marguerite Buffet in 1668. The argument for women being superior was widespread in Europe during the seventeenth century. These types of claims started through the notion that both men and women had rational souls, an idea which was uncontroversial at the time and was developed through a treatise by Cornelius Agrippa known as Declamation on the Nobility and Preeminence of the Female Sex in 1528. In the sixteenth century, pro-woman writers argued that the souls were equal and followed up with an argument that women are superior. The following century, some who argued women are superior did not believe that the sexes are equal. Marinella argued that both the bodies and the souls of women are superior to those of men, because the idea of a woman was more pleasing to God. She believed that women's bodies are more beautiful, writing "Divine beauty is . . . the first and principal cause of women's beauty", a view she claimed was inspired by Platonism. She saw women's beauty as not the cause, but the effect of women's superiority. Buffet, inspired by Augustine, argued that men and women are equal when it comes to Christian salvation, their souls, and their organs, but argues that women's physiology, intellectualism, and morality is superior.

=== Late modern period ===
Female superiority relates to the idea that women are more capable in solving political, economic, and social problems than men. A few women proposed that women are superior in the 1840s, and the idea expanded in 1874, during which Jane Fowler Willing, a staff member at Wesleyan university, Emily Huntington Miller, who worked in Northwestern university, and Martha McClellan Brown from Alliance, Ohio met together at Fairpoint, New York for a national Sunday school assembly. They believed that they could cure society's ills better than men could, and decided to combat liquor trafficking to prove that they could do it better than men. They then created an assembly and a national organization to promote this female work.

==== 20th century ====
In 1952, Ashley Montagu wrote the book The Natural Superiority of Women. In it, he argued that women are biologically superior. He argued that women have a better immune system, which makes them superior at dealing with things like sickness or fatigue. He also noted that although women may have smaller brains than men, they have more neurons within those brains, which makes women more insightful. He argues that women being superior is not meant to boast about how women are better, but to achieve equality between the sexes through men being convinced that women are superior, and that women are more equipped towards this plan than men. In the fourth edition of this book in 1992, Montagu said that "much new information bearing on the natural superiority of women has become available" as well as that "the new findings unexceptionally support and confirm the conclusions reached in this book".

Emily Stoper and Roberta Ann Johnson write that American second-wave feminists of the 1970s believed women's nature was morally superior to that of men. Writing that this "has produced certain political benefits", Stoper and Ann argue that the idea of female superiority limits women in politics and makes them psychologically weaker.

== See also ==
- Gynocentrism
- Matriarchy
- Misandry
- Sexism
- Supremacism § Sexual
