= The woman question =

Cultural discussions around the fundamental rights of women

In historiography, querelle des femmes ("dispute of women"), indicates an early-modern debate on the nature of women. This literary genre developed in Italian and French early humanist circles and was led by numerous women scholars, who wrote in Latin and vernacular to counter dominant misogynistic literature.

While the French phrase querelle des femmes deals specifically with the late medieval and Renaissance periods, the phrase woman question came to indicate feminist campaigns for social change after the 1700s, culminating in the later 19th century, with women's struggle to gain more recognition and relevance in modern industrialized societies. Issues of women's suffrage, reproductive rights, bodily autonomy, property rights, legal rights, medical rights, and marriage increasingly concerned public opinion in newspapers, political rallies and manifestos, conferences, pamphlets, and intellectual discussion. While women were leading the debate over a change in the roles played by women in the society, they initially represented a minority voice. Issues of marriage and sexual freedom often divided female public opinion.

== Context ==
The querelle des femmes or "dispute of women" originally referred to a literary genre and broad debate, that originated in humanistic and aristocratic circles in the Italian peninsula and France during the early modern period, regarding the nature of women, their capabilities, and whether they should be permitted to study, write, or govern in the same manner as men. Both in the scholarly and popular sphere, authors criticized and praised women's natures, arguing for or against their capacity to be educated in the same manner as men. As classical Aristotelianism held that women are incapable of reason, many argued that women's nature prevented them from higher learning. As the debate developed, some agreed that men were not naturally more intelligent than women – but argued that the female nature also prevented them from taking higher learning seriously. In addition, there was great controversy over Classical notions of women as inherently defective; literate women such as Christine de Pizan, Laura Cereta, Marguerite de Navarre, or Moderata Fonte refuted misogynistic attacks against women as a whole. While this debate was deeply meaningful and personal to some of the authors who wrote in support of or against women, participation in the querelle des femmes was also viewed as an intellectual exercise.

A resurgence in the debate over the nature and role of women is illustrated by the Romantic movement's exploration in fiction and drama (and opera) of the nature of "man", of human beings as individuals and as members of society. Conflict between women's prescribed roles, their own values, and their perceptions of self are prominent in such works as Die Walküre, Effi Briest, Madame Bovary, Middlemarch, Anna Karenina, A Doll's House, and Hedda Gabler. Each of these addresses women's emotional, social, economic, and religious lives, highlighting the ways in which "the woman question" had disrupted notions of a static nature which all women share.

== History ==
=== First use and traditional debate ===
The term was first used in France: the querelle des femmes (literally, 'dispute of women'). From 1450 into the years that witnessed the beginning of the Reformation, institutions controlled by the Catholic Church, had come into question. Secular states had begun to form in early modern Europe, and the feudal system was overtaken by centralized governments. This disruption extended to the relationships between men and women, and the Renaissance created a contraction of individual freedom for women, unlike men. These changes were justified through a number of arguments which referred to the inherent nature of women as subordinate to men.

On one side of the quarrel, many argued that women were inferior to men because man was created by God first, and were therefore stronger and more important. Also, much of Christianity throughout the ages, has viewed women as the Daughters of Eve, the original temptress responsible for humanity being expelled from the Garden of Eden. Augustine in particular understood women as having souls that were 'naturally more seductive', and emphasized their 'powerful inborn potential to corrupt'.

Religious justifications were not the only sources of information regarding woman's nature. As Renaissance humanism developed, there was great interest in returning to classical Greek and Roman philosophy. Classical philosophy held that women were inferior to men at a physical level, and this physical inferiority made them intellectually inferior as well. While the extent of this inferiority was hotly debated by the likes of Christine de Pizan and Moderata Fonte, women continued to be understood as inherently subordinate to men, and this was the basis for preventing women from attending universities or participating in the public sphere.

The 'defenders of women' on one side of the debate, according to Joan Kelly, "pointed out that the writings of the literate and the learned were distorted by what we now call sexism." They pointed out that accounts of women's deeds and nature were almost entirely written by men, many of whom had reasons to speak poorly of women. These writers, who were referred to as 'ladies' advocates' by the 17th and 18th centuries, promoted an empirical approach, which would measure the deeds and capabilities of women without bias. These arguments did not always insist that women were individuals, as modern feminists would argue, but often simply attempted to defend the 'nature' of women from slander.

=== 1400s ===
One of the first women to answer 'the woman question' was Christine de Pizan. She published The Book of the City of Ladies in 1405, in which de Pizan narrated her learning of the value of women and their virtue. The book is also a response to the Romance of the Rose, one of the most widely read books of the period, which attacked women and the value of marriage. While de Pizan wrote this book to justify her place in the world of literature and publishing at the time, The Book of the City of Ladies can be considered one important source in early feminism.

In the 1480s, Bartolomeo Goggio argued the superiority of women in his "De laudibus mulierum" [On the Merits of Women], which was dedicated to Eleanor of Naples, Duchess of Ferrara.

=== 1500s ===
Baldassare Castiglione contributed to the querelle in The Courtier in 1527, which voiced some support for the 'gentle' side of the debate, which favored women. In 1529, Heinrich Agrippa contended that men in society did not oppress women because of some natural law, but because they wanted to keep their social power and status. Agrippa argued for the nobility of women and thought women were created better than men. He argued that in the first place, women being made better than man, received the better name. Man was called Adam, which means Earth; woman Eva, which is by interpretation Life. Man was created from the dust of the earth, while woman was made from something far purer. Agrippa's metaphysical argument was that creation itself is a circle that began when God created light and ended when he created woman. Therefore, women and light occupy adjacent points on the circle of creation and must have similar properties of purity.

=== 1600s to 1700s ===
Moderata Fonte's The Worth of Women was published in 1600, with a preface from her daughter Cecilia and her son Pietro. According to her daughter, Moderata Fonte (Modesta di Pozzo di Zorzi) finished writing the dialog in 1592, before dying in childbirth. The dialog collected poetry and dialogues which proclaimed the value of women, arguing that their intelligence and capability to rule cannot be recognized if they are not educated. The tradition of defending women from specific attacks continued into the 1600s and 1700s:

Another poet, Sarah Fyge Field Egerton, appears to have written The Female Advocate (1686) – at age 14! – in reply to the "late satire on women" quoted for its obscenity; Judith Drake penned An Essay in Defence of the Female Sex (1696); and women of low and high station continued the polemic in the eighteenth century. – Joan Kelly, "Early Feminist Theory and the Querelle des Femmes.

The social and religious more and norms effecting the perception of women's behavior in the early modern era depended on the woman's social class, not only in terms of the expectations society had of them, but because their autonomy and ability to make choices, the legal protections and dignity privilege afforded, and access to education was not available for all women. The inequality in society was not only between men and women, but also among women of differing social and economic status. These matters took their place in the social discourse beginning only in the early 1700s, and there is little evidence that the querelle des femmes occupied a significant role in the public consciousness prior to the 18th century.

=== Victorian era ===
The term querelle des femmes was used in England in the Victorian era, stimulated, for example, by the Reform Act 1832 and the Reform Act 1867. The Industrial Revolution brought hundreds of thousands of lower-class women into factory jobs, presenting a challenge to traditional ideas of a woman's place.

A prime issue of contention was whether what was referred to as women's "private virtue" could be transported into the public arena; opponents of women's suffrage claimed that bringing women into public would dethrone them, and sully their feminine virtue.

== Areas of discussion ==
The woman question was raised in many different social areas. For example, in the second half of the 19th century, in the context of religion, extensive discussion within the United States took place on the participation of women in church. In the Methodist Episcopal Church, the woman question was the most pressing issue in the 1896 conference.

== See also ==
- A Vindication of the Rights of Woman
- Beguinage, community living for lay women
- The Book of the City of Ladies
- The Book of the Courtier
