= Callum Brown =

Callum Brown may refer to:

- Callum Brown (footballer, born 1998), Australian rules footballer who played for Collingwood
- Callum Brown (footballer, born 2000), Australian rules footballer who plays for Greater Western Sydney
- Callum Brown (author) (born 1953), Scottish historian and author
