= Callum Brown (author) =

Scottish historian and author

Emeritus Professor Callum Graham Brown FBA FRSE
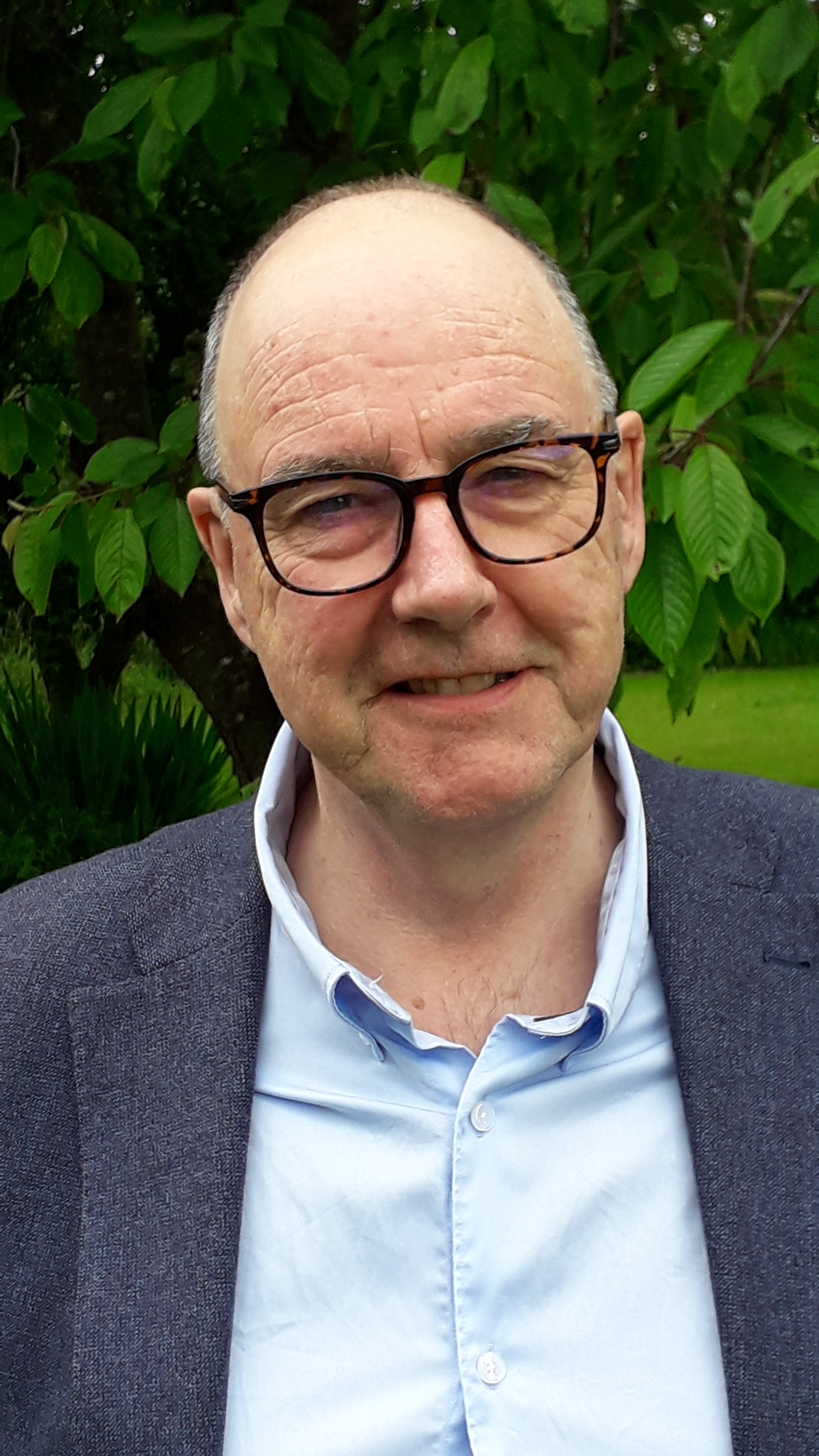
- Born: 1953 (age 72–73)
- Occupations: Historian and author
- Title: Professor Emeritus in History, University of Glasgow
- Spouse: Lynn Abrams

Academic background
- Education: M.A. Hons. Medieval and Modern History, University of St Andrews, 1975. Ph.D., Dept. of Economic and Social History, University of Glasgow, 1982.
- Alma mater: University of St Andrews, University of Glasgow
- Thesis: Religion and the development of an urban society: Glasgow 1780-1914 (1982)
- Doctoral advisor: Prof S.G Checkland and Prof R.J Holton

Academic work
- Discipline: History
- Institutions: University of Glasgow, University of Dundee, University of Strathclyde, Lancashire Polytechnic.
- Main interests: Secularisation in British society since the late 18th century, social history of atheism, secularisation theory, oral history, gender history.
- Notable works: The Death of Christian Britain, Becoming Atheist, The Battle for Christian Britain, The Humanist Movement in Modern Britain, Ninety Humanists and the Ethical Transition of Britain

Callum Graham Brown (b.1953) is a Scottish historian and author. Currently Emeritus Professor of History at the University of Glasgow, Brown is a Fellow of the British Academy and of the Royal Society of Edinburgh.

== Biography ==
Callum Brown was born in 1953 and raised in Edinburgh, Scotland. Following a brief period as a civil servant, he embarked on an academic career, teaching first at Lancashire Polytechnic (now the University of Lancashire) and then the University of Strathclyde from 1985 to 2004. He then moved to the University of Dundee, where he was Professor of History. Brown was latterly Professor of Late Modern European History at the University of Glasgow. In 2020 he celebrated his 30th year in the industry. Brown retired from teaching at the University of Glasgow in 2023. In July 2025, Brown was among 92 academics elected to the British Academy's Fellowship, recognising their outstanding contributions to the humanities and social sciences. He commented that after over forty years working as a historian, he was “delighted to be joining the British Academy.” "Though retired”, Brown said that he still “got a buzz from discovery in the archives”, and that he “hoped to continue researching and writing twentieth century British history for many years yet.” He is married to fellow historian, Lynn Abrams.

== Research and Publications ==
=== Secularisation ===
For fifty years, Callum Brown has studied the decline of religion, principally focusing upon Britain, but also Canada and the United States, and, to a lesser extent, Europe. In the first phase of his academic career, research concentrated upon the 19th century. His first monograph, the Social History of Religion in Scotland since 1730 adhered to a then current orthodoxy which envisaged the influence of religion having diminished during the late 19th century as a result of urbanisation. Later, Brown came to believe that this thesis was incorrect, and that secularisation did not properly take hold in Britain until the mid-twentieth century.^{1]} This first book was heavily revised for a new edition which appeared in 1997 as Religion and Society in Scotland since 1707.^{2]} The later edition argued that nineteenth century clergy had created a discourse of the 'unchurched' urban working classes which later influenced what historians believed, but that in reality, religiosity remained strong. It also drew upon then emerging trends in history writing, chiefly a burgeoning concern with identities. The book was perhaps the first Scottish history which related the marginalisation of a culture of puritanism in the 1960s and 1970s to arguments about changing expectations about leisure time. By the mid-2020s, Brown believed that the progress of secularisation had been sufficiently thorough in Scotland that if published today, Religion and Society in Scotland since 1707 might struggle to gain a significant readership due to low levels of public knowledge about churches, particularly amongst younger generations, coupled with the dwindling appeal of religious history.

Brown's focus then turned to reconceptualising secularisation in the twentieth century. His research moved beyond the borders of Scotland. He developed a central thesis which asserts that secularisation in the western Christian world has been both rapid and intense since the 1960s, but should not be regarded as confined to decline of churches, faith or religious behaviour. Secularisation, Brown argues, is multi-faceted. Eventually, he came to delineate five forms of secularisation which had previously been overlooked by historians, proceeding to research and write a book on each of them.

Firstly, secularisation was identified as the breakdown of hegemonic Christian culture, triggered by the collapse of conventional female piety in the 1960s, in The Death of Christian Britain (2000). Here, the ‘death’ of Christian Britain stands for the demise of the nation’s core religious and moral identity. For a thousand years, Brown reminds the reader, Christianity 'penetrated deeply into the lives of the people, enduring Reformation, Enlightenment and industrial revolution' by adapting. Then, in the 1960s, there was a ‘profound rupture’ which sent organised Christianity into a ‘downward spiral into the margins of social significance.’ When writing, Brown innovated using discourse analysis and women's history, both of which he had then recently been introduced to by Abrams, rejected the primacy of social class as insufficient to explain the magnitude of change in religious fortunes, instead alighting upon gender history. The Death of Christian Britain deployed a postmodern-inspired approach of discourse analysis and personal testimony study, combined use of which in religious history was then relatively novel. The book was widely reviewed upon publication and generated some controversy; Brown received biblical texts and warnings of hell, while some Christian historians and sociologists were hostile. In the early years of the internet, The Death of Christian Britain generated vigorous online discussion and engagement.

Secondly, in Religion and the Demographic Revolution (2012) secularisation was investigated as a demographic phenomenon. Secularisation was, Brown demonstrates, accompanied by a demographic revolution, in which family structure was revolutionised by plunging fertility and marriage rates, and in women's identities, a transformation in the social construction of gender, involving the search for autonomy in sexual expression, education and economic life. Secularisation has, Brown argues, been a gendered event, perhaps even 'highly feminine.' It emerges into sight as a 'process in which women's participation was slight before the 1960s, and major thereafter, with an impulse to reconstruction of female selfhood 'embroiled in the sixties revolution' and the ideological impulse of second-wave feminism.

Thirdly, secularisation was seen as the recrafting of the self, studied through oral history, in Becoming Atheist (2017). Based on interviews with 80 people stretching from Estonia in the east to Vancouver and San Francisco in the west, this book was the first to analyse how people narrated their loss of religion in and after the 1960s, according to gender, age, ethnicity and cultural contexts.

Fourthly, secularisation was studied as a struggle between liberal and conservative moralities in the 1960s, considered in The Battle for Christian Britain (2019). This conflict, conceived of as a 'battle' between conservative religious morality and secular humanists, a 'tiny, but well-organised group who developed, between the 1930s and the 1970s, a specific ethical polity, based on the individual’s right to control over their own body.' Sex and morality were the site of ‘battles galore’ as humanist activists sought legislative change in sexual affairs, including decriminalisation of male homosexuality, medical abortion and attempted suicide, as well as marriage law and divorce law reform, liberalised access to contraception, and an end of literary censorship. ‘Holding this ethical polity together,’ was, as lawyer Glanville Williams laid out in 1958, ‘a need to set the human body free from external, state endorsed theocratic control.’ But for conservative Christians like Roman Catholic lawyer, Norman St-John Stevas, these policies 'represented a dangerous credo which would cut the human body adrift through theology, state control and sexual restraint.' Sex was, Brown argues, ‘complexly and intensely entwined in post-war conservative Christian thought’, a ‘fuel for moral frenzy.’ The ensuing ‘battle’ was one with at least seven different front-line zones.’ First, there was the ‘struggle of conservative religionists to impose upon the British people a high degree of ignorance about the human body and sex’ through mechanisms of censorship in print, broadcasts, stage performances, film and education.’ Secondly, the struggle waged by local authorities on behalf of the churches and their members to impose moral puritanism upon the people by means of the licensing system. Brown examines this process through archival case studies of ‘licensing in the provinces’ - Blackpool, Sheffield, Glasgow, and the Isle of Lewis, showing how the local state varied in its moral priorities. Thirdly, a struggle between religionists and their opponents in the theatre of moral and medical law, and fourthly, a contest around the Christian monopoly on ethical and religious broadcasting. Fifthly, a ‘discreet tussle’ between the Church of England and the Roman Catholic Church over who could ‘pick up the moral baton dropped in the face of the secular challenge.’ The two final battles are sparingly addressed in the book, the first, he explains; the state surveillance of humanist and secularist figures is hard to address due to inaccessibility of sources, while the struggle over sex between liberalism and conservatism inside the major churches ‘awaited comprehensive scrutiny.’

Finally, in Ninety Humanists and the Ethical Transition of Britain (2026) secularisation as ethical change between 1930 and 1980 in an ‘Open Conspiracy’ of intellectuals. Here, Brown charts the role of elites in engineering ethical change, a 'fifty year transition devoid of party politics and religion' led by 'just under a hundred of Britain's leading scientists, writers and social reformers', who, inspired by the work of H.G. Wells, 'created a diverse and remarkably successful social movement', which 'led to the dismantling of 'longstanding Christian moral legislation.'

=== Oral History ===
Brown was one of the earlier pioneers of the use of oral history in Scotland. He began using the methodology in the early 1990s, when teaching and researching at the University of Strathclyde in Glasgow. In 1995, he co-founded, with Arthur McIvor, the Scottish Oral History Centre (SOHC), based at Strathclyde, as a hub for training, expertise and archiving oral history. The Centre reached its 30th anniversary in 2025. A book resulted from Brown's oral history work at Strathclyde, co-written with Arthur McIvor and the late Neil Rafeek, the University Experience 1945-75: An Oral History of the University of Strathclyde. For just under a decade, between 2009 and 2017, Brown worked on a rolling programme of oral history interviewing for his ‘Becoming Atheist’ research project, which investigated individual stories of secularisation since the 1960s. He enquired into the lives of humanists, atheists, agnostics, sceptics, secularists, rationalists, and freethinkers. Beginning in Scotland with the humanist celebrant who married him and his wife, Brown recruited informants across the United Kingdom, in Canada, and the United States, as well as in India, France and Estonia. The resulting collection of 78 interviews, supplemented by written testimonies, were transcribed manually by a team of transcribers, and assembled into a compendium of 649,257 words. Both the interview tapes and the compendia will be deposited in the Bishopsgate Archive, London. Between 2018 and 2020, Brown carried out oral history interviewing in the Western Highlands and Western Isles, investigating, with researcher, Ealasaid Munro, memories of the Highlands and Islands Film Guild, an organisation which brought cinema to rural communities.

=== Religion and the Heterosexual Revolution ===
Callum Brown's interest in secularisation led him to the history of sexualities. Drawing upon analysis of statistics for 'illegitimacy', he has argued for a 'short' sexual revolution as having taken place in England in the 1960s which proceeded the mass availability of the oral contraceptive pill. The 1960s, he has asserted, witnessed a sudden growth in pre-marital heterosexual intercourse, which implied a cultural rather than a technological cause for changing sexual behaviour. Examining social surveys, such as the published investigations by Geoffrey Gorer, Eustace Chesser and Michael Schofield, he found clear evidence of correlation between reported levels of religious activity and levels of pre-marital sexual activity. Finally, he argues that in the 1950s, the dominance of a conservative Christian culture in England restrained women's behaviour, but that attitudes changed in the 1960s, a shift led by the agency of single women. Changing female sexual behaviour and attitudes, accompanied by a collapse of 'respectability' and 'puritanism', Brown argues, constituted a significant instigator of the religious crisis of the 1960s.

=== Up Helly Aa ===
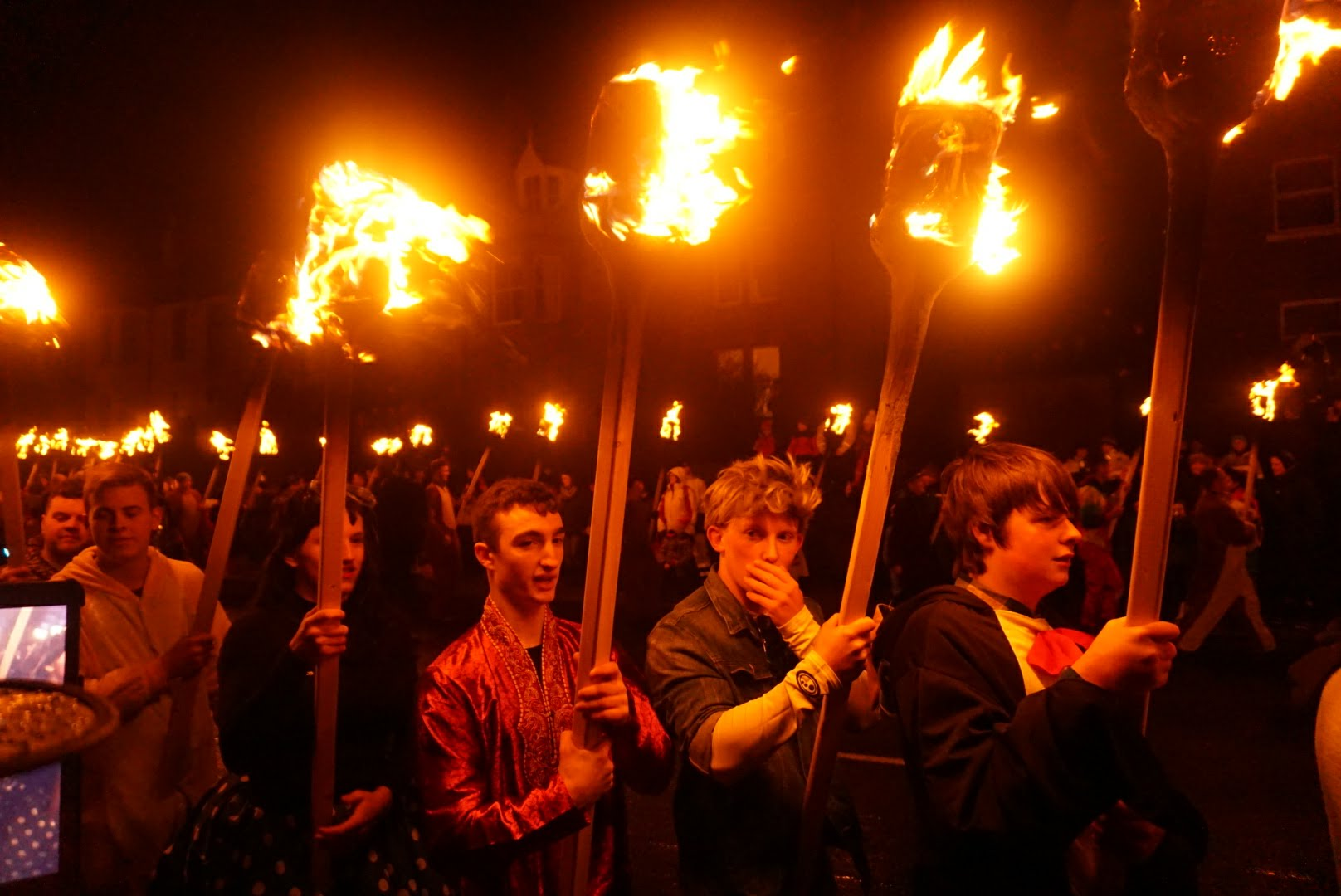
A number of guizers in fancy costumes bearing torches in the Lerwick Up Helly Aa procession captured as they marched down King Harald Street.

In the mid-1990s, Brown visited Lerwick in Shetland and became fascinated by Up Helly Aa, the large and spectacular winter fire festival for which the islands are famed. This interest resulted in his only book which is not concerned with secularisation: Up-Helly-Aa: Custom, Culture and Community in Shetland. Published in 1998, it was the first full study of the historical origins and contemporary significance of the festival. His interpretation drew upon Raphael Samuel’s concept of a ‘theatre of memory’, ‘a community place where popular history is produced without academic learning, but in which the present Shetland community is celebrated by constructing perceptions of the past within a participatory festival.’

The book explores the origins of the festival in the early 19th century, Lerwick having previously been a town in which ‘calendar rituals of inversion’ were unnecessary, because of the town’s nature as a ‘community of misrule’, an outpost of the Scottish, then British state in which insider status was demarcated by involvement in smuggling, drinking and sexual freedoms. When smuggling gave way to economic commercialisation after 1800, an effective internal hierarchy of power emerged, and chaotic yet ritualised misrule at Yule and New Year provided the town with a demonstration of plebeian power. Some of these rituals were spectacular and highly dangerous, involving guns, flaming tar barrels and home-made hand-grenades, as well as somewhat less threatening practical jokes.

In the mid-nineteenth century, the rise of a culture of restraint and respectability, fuelled by evangelical Christianity, pacified these events, and they were gradually reinvented. Up Helly Aa emerged as a ritual which combined the symbols of misrule with civic respectability. From the mid-1880s, the event took on the theme of Norse revival, with the arrival of the ‘Guizer Jarl’, his squad, the burning galley, and songs of praise to medieval Norsemen. Throughout this development, Brown argues, the people recrafted their identity again and again. Up Helly Aa, he asserts, is 'authentic' heritage, not because of its symbolisms, but because it is a 'celebration of the spirit of freedom from bumptious and interfering authority upon which Lerwick was founded in the early seventeenth century upon the shores of the Sound of Bressay.'

== Critical reception ==
Ronald Hutton considered that Up Helly Aa was 'an excellent study which links history and anthropology in a fashion that does credit to both. The whole thing is excitingly written, with a strong structure which bowls the reader along. It is both erudite and vivid.' The following year, the book won the Frank Watson Prize for best book or monograph published on Scottish History.

Death of Christian Britain was widely reviewed when first published. Richard Holloway, former Episcopalian Bishop of Edinburgh, said it was a ‘brave plunge into one of the most complex debates of the era,’ while David L. Williams, writing in The Tablet, saw a ‘study which deserved the attention of all who are seriously concerned with the history of future of British Christianity.’ Jeremy Morris, in The Historical Journal, said the book was, ‘a tour de force in the social history of religion’ and that ‘this most provocative of historians has pulled off an extraordinary feat’ (in reconceptualising secularisation from the 19th century to the 1960s) and which used a ‘range of evidence formerly untouched by historians.’ For Reviews in History, Sheridan Gilley found the book, ‘one of the most entertaining, moving and stimulating works on the subject.’ But not all reviewers felt so positively, with some taking strong issue with aspects of the book. Monica Furlong, in the Journal of Ecclesiastical History, suggested that Brown was ‘bold, and maybe a little gleeful’ in his narrative of Christian discursive decline, and also that ‘religiosity’ was, she felt, a ‘pejorative word’ which made her ‘doubt his impartiality.’

Hugh McLeod, writing in Social History, praised Becoming Atheist: Humanism and the Secular West, which appeared in 2017, for its innovative uses of oral history, saying that the ‘originality of Brown’s account lies not only in the highly detailed tracing of individual life stories, but also in showing patterns of similarity between accounts by those of the same nationality, ethnicity, gender or religious background.’ McLeod found Callum Brown’s analysis of the impact of different ethnic or religious backgrounds upon journeys to humanism, such as those of African Americans and secular Jews to be ‘especially interesting.’ McLeod did however, offer some reservations, chiefly, that the book canvased the memories of members of humanist organisations, a small group, rather than a 'random sample of atheists.' They were, he asserted, a 'distinctive group', mostly 'elderly, many well-educated and containing no less than ten-percent former clergy or trainee clergy.' McLeod was also doubtful about the primacy in a book about 'the West' of the emphasis on the 1960s as a moment of religious rupture in Britain, which 'would have been impossible if he was writing about Germany or France.' While Brown had 'been successful in showing how committed humanists saw the world', McLeod said, there remained room for a 'more detached analysis.' Edward Royle, in the Journal of Ecclesiastical History, found the book a 'carefully researched and closely argued study, written from an atheist point of view' which 'should provoke religious historians to re-examine their assumptions about how the process of secularisation should be understood in the contemporary world.'

Religion and the Demographic Revolution was appraised by Todd Green, reviewer for Church History, to have ‘delivered a persuasive argument for connections between demography, religion and secularisation. The sheer range of data he [Brown] draws on makes his case impressive.’ Given the ‘neglect of gender in traditional accounts of religious change and decline in modern histories of the West, Green felt that ‘Brown’s book is an indispensable contribution to the field’ which would ‘go a long way to helping bring gender as a crucial category of analysis from the periphery to the centre of the secularisation debate.’ S.C Williams, for the English Historical Review, considered Religion and the Demographic Revolution to be a ‘fascinating analysis’ which brought together and studied the bonds between ‘three powerful revolutions: the secular, the demographic and the revolution in women’s identities.’ She was more critical of the book’s treatment of the demographic growth of ‘other religionists’, whose mass immigration from regions with faith traditions other than Christianity ‘had become a vital characteristic of each of the countries studied.’ However, Williams concluded it ‘remained the case that Brown had produced a watershed book which opened new ground in the social history of religion.’

The Battle for Christian Britain: Sex, Humanists and Secularisation, 1945-1980, which was published in 2019, was reviewed by Jon Lawrence in the American Historical Review. Lawrence considered the book a 'rich and original study, its local case studies (of London, Sheffield, Blackpool, Glasgow and the Isle of Lewis) adding an important new dimension to our understanding of post-war social and cultural history, not just by decentring London in the story of an increasingly sexualised and permissive culture, but also by reminding us of the continued importance of local religious, political and social traditions in the practical implementation of state policies in the era.’ Lawrence also welcomed ‘Brown’s sustained focus on the role of secular humanists in driving social reforms’, but questioned whether he had adequately explained the forces eroding the culture of social deference in post-war Britain, suggesting the one pertinent factor was an elite crisis of confidence in telling other people how to live their lives. Grace France, writing in Twentieth Century British History, considered that the ‘most significant triumph’ of the book was Brown’s ‘emphasis on the content of the battles themselves and not solely on their eventual outcomes’, which ‘carved out a place for Christian activists’, whose eventual demise obscured their earlier importance. It was worth ending her review, France said, with Brown’s opening vignette of a woman in Sussex complaining about the naked mannequins in a shop window, anticipating there might be a law against such a display. ‘The book begins,’ she summarised, ‘in a culture where such a complaint was commonplace and ends in one where it was not.’ The Battle for Christian Britain is, she considered, thoroughly researched and endlessly fascinating.’

The Humanist Movement in Modern Britain, which Brown co-authored with David Nash and Charlie Lynch, appeared in 2023. Its main thesis is that organised humanism achieved a ‘disproportionate’ influence on international affairs and domestic social policy in the mid-20th century, experienced crisis and retrenchment in the 1970s and 1990s, but recovered in the 21st century by 'championing a distinctive ethical approach to human rights, sexual liberty and the autonomy of the individual.' Nathan Alexander, writing in the Journal of British Studies, appraised the book as one which, while obviously appealing to scholars of non-religion, was relevant to historians of Britain because 'it describes a phenomenon which had seemingly happened under their noses. The majority of society had become non-religious, largely holding humanist values.' John Carter Wood, in Contemporary British History, was rather more critical, adjudging that with the authors ‘very much on the side of their humanist protagonists’, the presumption that humanists formed the ‘ethical vanguard of Britain’ made for a ‘somewhat flattened story’ which overlooked ‘darker sides of secularist thought.’ However, Carter Wood decided that while the book was ‘partial in scope and partisan in its commitments, it was clearly a ‘significant achievement which offers a detailed and carefully researched study of key institutions of non-belief in Britain, effectively drawing out overarching patterns in organised non-belief.’

== Books ==
=== Monographs ===
- The Social History of Religion in Scotland since 1730 (Routledge, 1987)
- The People in the Pews: Religion and Society in Scotland since 1780 (Economic and Social History Society of Scotland, 1993)
- Religion and Society in Scotland since 1707 ( Edinburgh University Press, 1997)
- Up-helly-aa: Custom, Culture and Community in Shetland (Mandolin, 1999)
- The Death of Christian Britain: Understanding Secularisation, 1800-2000 (Routledge, 2000)
- Religion and Society in Twentieth-Century Britain (Routledge, 2006)
- Postmodernism for Historians (Routledge, 2013)
- Becoming Atheist: Humanism and the Secular West (Bloomsbury Academic, 2017)
- Religion and the Demographic Revolution: Women and Secularisation in Canada, Ireland, UK and USA since the 1960s (Boydell, 2012)
- The Battle for Christian Britain: Sex, Humanists and Secularisation, 1945-1980 (Cambridge University Press, 2019)
- Ninety Humanists and the Ethical Transformation of Britain: The Open Conspiracy, 1930-80 (Bloomsbury, 2026)

==== Co-authored volumes ====
- The University Experience 1945-1975: An Oral History of the University of Strathclyde (with Arthur J. McIvor and Neil Rafeek) (Edinburgh University Press, 2004)
- Britain Since 1707 (with Hamish Fraser) (Routledge, 2010)
- Religion in Scots Law (with Thomas Green and Jane Mair) (Edinburgh, Humanist Society Scotland, 2016), pp. 355; published online https://www.humanism.scot/what-we-do/research/religion-in-scots-law/
- The Humanist Movement in Modern Britain: a History of Ethicists, Rationalists and Humanists (with David Nash and Charlie Lynch) (Bloomsbury, 2023)

==== Edited books ====
- A History of Everyday Life in Twentieth-century Scotland (ed. Callum G. Brown and Lynn Abrams) (Edinburgh, Edinburgh University Press, 2010)
- Secularisation in the Christian World c.1750-c.2000: Essays in Honour of Hugh McLeod (ed. Callum G. Brown and Michael Snape) (Ashgate, 2010)

== Articles in refereed journals ==
- “The Curse: Film and the churches in the Western Isles 1945 to 1980” (with Ealasaid Munro), Northern Scotland v.11 iss.1 (2020), pp. 60-79.
- “The necessity of atheism: making sense of secularisation”, Journal of Religious History vol. 41(4) (2017), pp. 439-456.
- “The Unholy Mrs Knight” and the BBC: secular humanism and the threat to the Christian nation, c.1945-1960’, English Historical Review vol. 127 (2012), pp. 345-376.
- “The People of No Religion: the demographics of secularisation in the English-speaking world since c.1900”, Archiv für Sozialgeschichte vol. 51 (2011), pp. 37-61.
- “Sex, religion and the single woman c.1950-1975: the importance of a ‘short’ sexual revolution to the English religious crisis of the sixties”, Twentieth Century British History vol. 22 (2011), pp. 189-215.
- “What was the religious crisis of the 1960s?” Journal of Religious History vol. 34, No. 4 (December 2010), pp. 468-79.
- “Secularisation, the growth of militancy and the spiritual revolution: religious change and gender power in Britain 1901-2001”, Historical Research vol. 80, no. 209 (August 2007), pp. 393-418.
- “Sport and the Scottish Office in the twentieth-century: the promotion of a social and gender policy”, European Sports History Review, vol. 1 (1999), pp. 183-202.
- “Sport and the Scottish Office in the twentieth-century: the control of a social problem”, European Sports History Review, vol. 1 (1999), pp. 164-82.
- “The Scottish Office and sport 1899-1972”, Scottish Centre Research Papers in Sport, Leisure and Society, vol. 2 (1997), pp. 1-18.
- ‘“To be aglow with civic ardours’: the Godly Commonwealth in Glasgow, 1843-1914’, Records of the Scottish Church History Society, vol. 26 (1996), pp. 169-95.
- “The religion of an industrial village: the churches in Balfron 1789-1850”, Scottish Local History Journal vol. 35 (1995), pp 9-15.
- “Secularization: a theory in danger?” Scottish Economic and Social History vol. 11 (1991), pp.52-58.
- “Did urbanization secularize Britain?” Urban History Yearbook (Leicester University Press) 1988, pp. 1-14.
- “The costs of pew-renting: church management, church-going and social class in nineteenth-century Glasgow”, Journal of Ecclesiastical History, vol. 38 (1987), pp. 347-361.
- “The Sunday-school movement in Scotland 1780-1914”, Records of the Scottish Church History Society vol. xxi (1981), pp. 3-26.

== Book chapters ==
- [With Lynn Abrams] ‘“Is du da man?”: male violence and ritual in Shetland’, in Mark Smith and Ian Tait (eds.), History Maker: Essays in Honour of Brian Smith (Lerwick, Shetland Times, 2024),194-202.
- 'Secularisation and Law in Modern Societies', in R. Sandberg, N. Doe, B. Kane and C Roberts (eds.), The Research Handbook on Interdisciplinary Approaches to Law and Religion (Cheltenham, Edward Elgar Publishing, 2019)
- 'How Anglicans lose religion: an oral history of becoming secular', in Abby Day (ed.), Contemporary Issues in the Worldwide Anglican Communion: Powers and Pieties (Farnham, Ashgate, 2016), pp. 245-66
- ‘Unfettering religion: women and the family chain in the late twentieth century’, in John Doran, Charlotte Methuen and Alexandra Walsham (eds.), Religion and the Household. Studies in Church History vol. 50 (Woodbridge, Boydell Press, 2014), pp.469-91
- ‘Men losing faith: the making of modern no-religionism in the UK 1939-2010’, in Lucy Dulap and Sue Morgan (eds.), Men, Masculinities and Religious Change in Britain Since 1900 (Basingstoke, Palgrave, 2013)
- 'Atheism in the twentieth century’, in Stephen Bullivant and Michael Ruse (eds.), The Oxford Handbook of Atheism (Oxford, Oxford University Press, 2013)
- ‘Gender, Christianity and the rise of no religion: the heritage of the sixties in Britain’ in Michael Gauvreau and Nancy Christie (eds.), The Sixties and Beyond: Dechristianization in North America and Western Europe, 1945-2000 (Toronto, Toronto University Press, 2013).
- ‘From religion to ‘non-religion’? A cultural explanation of the changing religious landscape of Britain since 1945’ (with Gordon Lynch), in L. Woodhead and R. Catto (eds.), Religion in Contemporary Britain (London, Routledge, 2012), pp. 329-351
- ’Masculinity and secularisation in twentieth-century Britain’, in Yvonne-Maria Werner (ed.), Christian Masculinity: Men and Religion in Northern Europe in the 19^{th} and 20^{th} Centuries (Leuven, Leiden University Press, 2011), pp. 47-59.
- ‘Gendering secularisation: locating women in the transformation of British Christianity in the 1960s’ for I. Katznelson and G. Stedman Jones (eds.), Religion and the Political Imagination (Cambridge, Cambridge University Press, 2010), pp. 275-94.
- ‘Women and religion in Britain: the autobiographical view of the fifties and sixties’, in C. Brown and M. Snape (eds.), Secularisation in the Christian World c.1750-c.2000, pp.159-73.
- ‘Introduction: conceptualising secularisation 1974-2010: the influence of Hugh McLeod’ (with Michael Snape), in C. Brown and M. Snape (eds.), Secularisation in the Christian World c.1750-c.2000, pp.1-12.
- ‘Spectacle, restraint and the twentieth-century Sabbath wars: the “everyday” Scottish Sunday’, in L. Abrams and C.G. Brown (eds.), A History of Everyday Life in Twentieth-century Scotland (Edinburgh, Edinburgh University Press, 2010), pp. 153-80.
- ‘Charting everyday experience’, in L. Abrams and C.G. Brown (eds.), A History of Everyday Life in Twentieth-century Scotland (Edinburgh, Edinburgh University Press, 2010), pp. 19-47.
- ‘Introduction. A day in the life: conceiving the everyday in the twentieth century’ (with Lynn Abrams), in L. Abrams and C.G. Brown (eds.), A History of Everyday Life in Twentieth-century Scotland (Edinburgh, Edinburgh University Press, 2010), pp. 1-18.
- 'How religious was Victorian Britain?', Reading 15 in Kelly Boyd and Rohan McWilliam, eds., The Victorian Studies Reader (London: Routledge, 2007) pp. 244-251.
- ‘The Kirk and the Word: meanings in the ecclesiastical terminology of Scotland’, in L. Hölscher (ed), Baupläne der sichtbaren Kirche. Sprachliche Konzepte religiöser Vergemeinschaftung in Europa [Concepts of religious bodies in modern European societies] (Gőttingen, Wallstein-Verlag, 2007), pp. 151-67.
- 'The unconverted and the conversion: gender relations in the salvation narrative in Britain 1800-1960', in J.N. Bremmer, W.J. van Bekkum, and A.L. Molendijk (eds.), Paradigms, Poetics and Politics of Conversion (Leuven and Paris, Peeter, 2006), pp. 183-99.
- ‘Religion’, in L. Abrams et al. (eds.), The Gender History of Scotland (Edinburgh, Edinburgh University Press, 2006), pp. 84-110.
- 'The secularisation decade: what the 1960s have done to the study of religious history', in H. McLeod and W Ustorf (eds.), The Decline of Christendom in Western Europe 1750-2000 (Cambridge, Cambridge University Press, 2003), pp. 29-46.
- 'The myth of the Established Church of Scotland', in J. Kirk (ed.), The Scottish Churches and the Union Parliament 1707-1999 (Edinburgh, Scottish Church History Society, 2001), pp. 48-74.
- ‘Rotavating the Kailyard: re-imagining the Scottish ‘meenister’ in discourse and the parish state since 1707’ in N Aston and M. Cragoe (eds), Anticlericalism in Britain c.1500-1914 (Stroud, Sutton, 2000), pp. 138-58.
- 'The myth of the Established Church of Scotland', in J. Kirk (ed.), The Scottish Churches and the Union Parliament 1707-1999 (Edinburgh, Scottish Church History Society, 2001), pp. 48-74.
- ‘Rotavating the Kailyard: re-imagining the Scottish ‘meenister’ in discourse and the parish state since 1707’ in N Aston and M. Cragoe (eds), Anticlericalism in Britain c.1500-1914 (Stroud, Sutton, 2000), pp. 138-58.
- ‘Sport and the Scottish Office on the twentieth century: the control of a social problem’, in J.A. Mangan (ed.), Sport in Europe: Politics, Class, Gender (London, Frank Cass, 1999), pp. 164-82
- ‘Sport and the Scottish Office on the twentieth century: the promotion of a social and gender policy’, in J.A. Mangan (ed.), Sport in Europe: Politics, Class, Gender (London, Frank Cass, 1999), pp. 183-202.
- Brown, ‘Piety, gender and war in Scotland in the 1910s’, in C. Macdonald and E. McFarland (eds.), Scotland and the Great War (East Linton, Tuckwell, 1999), pp. 172-191.
