= Lynn Abrams =

Scottish historian

Professor Lynn Abrams FBA FRHistS FRSE
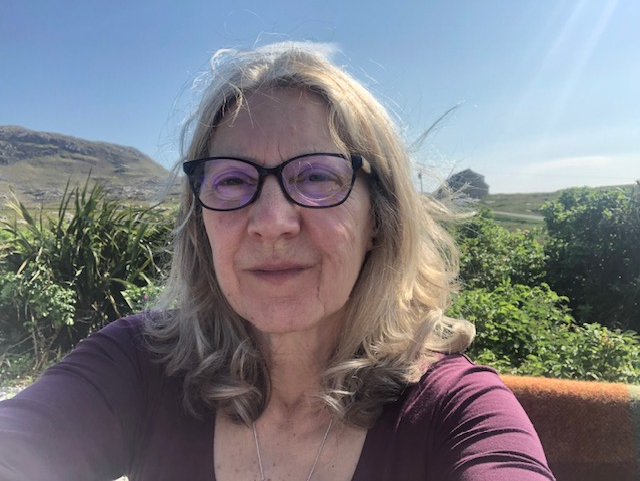
- Born: 1960 (age 65–66)
- Occupations: Historian and author
- Title: Professor of Modern History, School of Humanities, University of Glasgow
- Spouse: Callum G. Brown

Academic background
- Education: University of East Anglia
- Thesis: Aspects of popular culture, leisure and recreation in imperial Germany : with particular reference to Bochum and Düsseldorf. UEA 1988.
- Doctoral advisor: Prof Richard J. Evans

Academic work
- Discipline: History
- Sub-discipline: Gender history; Oral history; History of early childhood care and education; History of feminism; Social history
- Institutions: University of Bristol, Lancaster University, University of Glasgow.
- Notable works: Oral History Theory, Feminist Lives: Women, Feelings and the Self in Post-War Britain, Myth and Materiality in a Women's World: Shetland 1800–2000, The Orphan Country: Children of Scotland's Broken Homes, 1845 to the Present Day.

Lynn Abrams FBA FRHistS FRSE is a historian and Professor of History at the University of Glasgow, and a Fellow of the British Academy (2018). She is Chair in Modern History at the University of Glasgow, where her research and teaching interests include the history of women and gender relations in Britain, and oral history.

== Biography ==
Lynn Abrams was born in 1960. She began her career studying nineteenth century Germany, and completed her doctorate at the University of East Anglia. In 1990, she was appointed to her first permanent academic position at Lancaster University. Five years later, Lynn moved to the University of Glasgow, where, seeking a change of direction, she embarked upon research into the history of the child welfare system in Scotland. In 2003, Abrams became Professor of Gender History, and in 2013, Chair of Modern History. In 2010, she authored Oral History Theory, an overview of oral history theory, the first of its kind. Lynn has published widely in academic journals and edited volumes, and has authored five books. More recently, she has led a project on the history of the production of knitted textiles in Scotland. In 2018, Lynn was elected a Fellow of the British Academy, in recognition of her contribution to scholarship and research in the humanities.

== Research and publications ==
Abrams' work has been characterised by a concern with modern gender relations, with the experiences of women, and with accessing the voices of those who experienced past mechanisms of power. Her interest in gender history developed from her work on 19th century Germany, and became the core focus for the rest of her career. Alongside this sprung an interest in the practice and theory of oral history, and in modern Scottish social history.

=== Gender ===
One of her first published works which deployed gender history examined ‘concubinage’ and cohabitation in Düsseldorf, North Rhine-Westphalia, in the 19^{th} century. It explored the tension between middle class morality and the everyday lives of working class people, suggesting that fear of uncontrolled female sexuality fuelled attempts at legal and social regulation.

=== Oral history ===
Abrams is one of the leading figures in oral history in Britain. She began exploring the method in the late 1990s, first recording lived experiences of the care system in Scotland. While doing this, she quickly realised that her interviews were about more than the 'facts' of people's lives – they were shaped by the act of storytelling and by the lives of her informants in the present day. Abrams considers that studying narrative, the form in which people make and use stories to make sense of their lives, and accessing subjectivity – asking not merely "what happened", but about feelings and emotions – are the bread and butter of oral history. Her early understanding of oral history was influenced by Penny Summerfield, who had been a colleague at Lancaster University, who, Abrams has said, 'brought a strong, theoretical social science inflected perspective. She read, too, the work of Alessandro Portelli, Michael Frisch, and Daniel James. Her next book project shifted focus to Shetland, Myth and Materiality in a Women's World: Shetland 1800–2000. Around this time, she began engaging with feminist approaches, which she has credited with 'transforming the field and pushing the boundaries of what oral history can do.' By the 2000s, she was teaching an undergraduate course on oral history at the University of Glasgow when she realised there was not a suitable book which gave an accessible overview of the field. "I was sending them off to read original, dense, theoretical texts", she commented in a 2025 interview, "which they would not do! Therefore, I decided to dig into the theory and show how it is used in oral history." Oral History Theory, first published in 2010, is structured around key themes, including the peculiarities of oral history, selfhood, subjectivity and intersubjectivity, memory, narrative, performance and power. Central to the book is the belief that practice and analysis are inseparable and that the process of interviewing cannot be divorced from the production of an oral history narrative and its interpretation.

=== Childhood and welfare ===
In the late 1990s, Abrams had moved to Glasgow, where she had 'no immediate plans to go native.' But she stumbled, almost by chance, upon an area of Scottish social history which was then neglected: The story of children and social welfare between the mid-19th and late 20th centuries. Her research into children and the welfare and protection system, published as The Orphan Country: Children of Scotland's Broken Homes from 1845 to the Present Day, was the first comprehensive study of its kind in Scotland. It focused upon children's lived experiences, examining the consequences of family crisis and breakdown. During this project, Abrams came to realise the shortcomings of archival sources which did not tell her about lived experience, and turned to oral history in her first serious engagement with the method. She travelled across Scotland, especially the North, interviewing elderly people who had grown up in the care system. Orphan Country focused upon a time, some of which was then within lived memory, when experience of the care system was considerably more common than it was by the end of the twentieth century. This was due to the extent of rural and urban poverty then prevailing in Scotland. Although common enough in most of urban Britain, and Europe, in this period, the Scottish lower-class family, Abrams argued, suffered intensely from the social consequences of deindustrialisation, urbanisation, rural depopulation and poverty. There was a low wage and seasonal economy, high rates of mortality and poor housing. The effects of this were much exacerbated by the absence of a comprehensive welfare safety net. A distinctive feature of the system was a preference for boarding out, where children were fostered with families in rural places, especially the Highlands and Islands. The ideology of boarding out, further examined in a subsequent article, was informed by discourses of middle class family life and evangelical purity, which were used to justify disciplinary strategies, but rather than attempting to imitate bourgeois families, children were ‘rescued’ and placed with labouring families in the Highlands and Islands, and in Canada, in a ‘massive experiment in social engineering.’ More cynically, boarding out was intended to bolster the rural economy and its workforce. Foster families were rarely vetted and the system failed to account for the rights of the child. It was only in the 1940s, Abrams showed, that boarding out began to be criticised by officialdom. More recently, Abrams was commissioned by the Scottish Child Abuse Inquiry to investigate, assisted by researcher, Linda Fleming, records from Aberlour Orphanages, Quarrier's Homes and Dr Barnardo's Homes between the 1930s and the 1990s. Giving evidence to the Inquiry, headed by Lady Smith, Abrams commented upon the practice of transporting 'orphans' to Canada and Australia between the late 19th century and 1970, saying that: "Evangelical philanthropists used emigration schemes for almost 100 years as an efficient means to pursue the destruction of thousands of Scottish working class families."

=== Homes and housing ===
In the early 2010s, Lynn became interested in the contemporary history of homes and housing in Scotland. In 2011, she received a small grant from Scottish Enterprise and the University of Glasgow to collaborate with East Kilbride and District Housing Association to investigate, with Linda Fleming, the extent to which ‘modern’ homes of the new town of East Kilbride, constructed from the 1940s to the 1960s, met the expectations of its original planners. Around the same time, Abrams and Fleming began working on the history of everyday life in the Scottish home, arguing for taking the history of homes seriously, with domestic space a historical nexus for changes and continuity in the texture of everyday life, whether banal or transformative. Despite the upheavals of the twentieth century, they asserted, including changes to architecture, culture, gender ideologies, and structural and material social changes, as well as a rise in personal autonomy, levels of consumption, and access to entertainment and leisure, ‘the home remained the fulcrum of identity for most Scots.’

In 2015, she led a research project on the experiences of those who were rehoused in high rise flats in Glasgow in the 1960s and 1970s. The Housing, Everyday Life and Wellbeing team examined social history of public housing in Glasgow, focusing on 20th century social housing such as the Red Road high rise flats, rather than the tenement on which previous research had tended to focus.

Working with Valerie Wright, Lynn contributed oral history research on homes, families, community and opportunity to a co-authored volume on the social and architectural history of Scotland’s new towns: Building Modern Scotland. Commenting on the oral history element of the book, Wright has said their research identified a way in which collective narratives had emerged in the new towns, and that these have been difficult for people to contradict or challenge. For example, the ‘new town dream’ emerged from the collective effort, in the early days of these settlements, to build new communities and fulfil the aspirations of those who had moved there. A second collective narrative was that since the 1990s, the new towns had been neglected.

=== Textiles ===
Abrams’ research on Shetland, and particularly women’s work as knitters, led to an interest in the history of knitted textile production in Scotland. The project ‘Knitting in the Round’, supported by RSE Workshop and Network grants, encompassed a series of events and innovative activities involving the amateur knitting community, one creative output involved knitting the Commonwealth flags for the 2014 Glasgow games. A Knitter-in-Residence was appointed at the University of Glasgow, and there was a citizen science project knitting up samples of Shetland lace. She was awarded a UKRI Research grant in 2019 for ‘Fleece to Fashion: Economies and Cultures of Knitting in Modern Scotland’, working with Dr Sally Tuckett, Professor Marina Moskowitz, Dr Roslyn Chapman and Dr Lin Gardner, the project followed the production cycle from fleece to fashion, interrogating why and how knitting has adapted to and survived modernisation to become a distinctive heritage brand in the modern Scottish economy and culture. It also supported a second citizen science project in collaboration with National Museums of Scotland and the Klein Foundation, to throw light on the design and production practices of Scottish knitwear designer Margaret Klein.

== Editorial ==
Abrams has served on the boards of a number of academic journals. She is currently a member of the editorial board for the Journal of Scottish Historical Studies, and Studies in Oral History: The Journal of Oral History Australia. With Cordelia Beattie, Arunima Datta and Julie Hardwick, she is an editor for Manchester University Press' Gender and History book series. Between 2008 and 2015, she was convenor of Women's History Scotland, during which time the organisation published the first edition of the Biographical Dictionary of Scottish Women.

Lynn is currently Chair of the Social History Society, having been elected in 2025.

== Research ==
She coordinated the public event Reinventing Scotland's Woollen Traditions in Glasgow in 2012, which explored the history and influence of knitting on Scotland, as well as the impact of it resurgence in popularity on Scotland's creative industries and tourism.

In 2017, Abrams joined calls for public memorials to Scottish women accused of and executed for witchcraft between the 16th and 18th centuries, saying it reflected a wider dearth of visible monuments to Scottish women.

== Critical response ==
Deborah Simonton, writing in Gender and History, praised Myth and Materiality in a Woman's World as a book which, in expanding the methodology of social and gender histories ‘allows us to seek, and perhaps find answers using lateral thinking and creativity in our research and writing’, adding that some might find the book challenging to their perceptions of ‘how history is done’, showing ‘how important memory, myth making and identity are in the creation of a historical past.’ The book was, she concluded, ‘an important addition to the literature on gender and Scottish history.’

Allessandro Portelli, reviewer for Oral History, the journal of the Oral History Society, considered that Oral History Theory’s most important theoretical insight was that theory was a consequence, not a precondition, of practice. The purpose of the book, was, he said, ‘ultimately to lead practitioners towards better practices and understandings of oral history’, with Abrams providing a ‘state of the art critical survey of a plurality of approaches.’ ‘Ultimately’, Portelli concluded, Abrams ‘presents oral history as a field of tensions: between fragmentation and cohesion of the self, between individual and social, between the subjects of the field encounter and between power and the powerless.’ For the Oral History Review, Ronald J. Grele perceived a ‘book of large ambitions’ which ‘sought to winnow through the increasingly large and varied literature on oral history and its underlying body of theory.’ While making some theoretical criticisms, Grele concluded that Oral History Theory was ‘a remarkable teaching text’, which provided a ‘handy guide to relevant theories, leaving room for the engaged reader to explore beyond its boundaries.’

In 2013, Abrams' research study on masculinity in Highland men between 1760 and 1840 was subject to media attention, when it received criticism from Gaelic writer Angus Peter Campbell. Abrams studied the records of courts in Inverness and found a model of "disciplined masculinity" which subsumed a previously more lawless and violent Highland culture. Campbell argued the research was flawed because of the difficulty of understanding Highland society at that time without a knowledge of Gaelic.

Alistair Fair, for Urban History, adjudged that Glasgow: High Rise Homes, Estates and Communities, co-authored with Ade Kearns, Barry Hazley and Valerie Wright, was a ‘small but valuable book' which ‘challenged the idea that living in high-rise housing was a consistently and inevitably alienating experience.’ Through its foregrounding of resident’s voices, Fair argued, the book counters the ‘top down’ focus of much of the writing on the architecture of post-war British social democracy.

== Personal life ==
Callum Brown, a fellow historian at the University of Glasgow, is Abrams' partner.

== Books ==
=== Monographs ===
- Feminist Lives: Women, Feelings, and the Self in Post-War Britain (Oxford: Oxford University Press, 2023)
- Glasgow: High Rise Housing, Estates and Communities (London, Routledge, 2020)
- Oral History Theory (London: Routledge, 2010, 2nd edition 2016)
- Myth and Materiality in a Woman's World: Shetland 1800–2000 (Manchester: Manchester University Press, 2005)
- The Making of Modern Woman: Europe 1789–1918 (Harlow: Longman, 2002)
- The Orphan Country: Children of Scotland's Broken Homes from 1845 to the Present Day (Edinburgh: John Donald, 1998)
- Bismarck and the German Empire, 1871–1918 (London: Routledge, 1995)
- Workers' Culture in Imperial Germany: Leisure and Recreation in the Rhineland and Westphalia (London: Routledge, 1992)

=== Co-authored volume ===
- Knitting in Scotland: Craft, Culture, Industry (London, Bloomsbury, 2026) [L.Abrams, R.Chapman, L.Gardner, M.Moskowitz, S.Tuckett].

=== Edited books ===
- Nine Centuries of Man: Masculinities in Scottish History, with E. Ewan eds.(Edinburgh University Press 2016/17) Includes joint authored introduction and sole authored chapter.
- A History of Everyday Life in Twentieth Century Scotland, with C. G.Brown eds. (Edinburgh University Press, 2010)
- Gender in Scottish History, 1700 to the Present, with Eleanor Gordon, Deborah Simonton & Eileen Yeo (eds), (Edinburgh University Press, 2006)
- Gender Relations in German History: Power, Agency and Experience from the Sixteenth to the Twentieth Century, with E.Harvey eds. (UCL Press, London, 1996).

== Articles in refereed journals ==
- L. Abrams and R. Chapman, ‘Re-creating Historic Modern Hand Knitting: Working with a Community of Practice’, Textile (In Press, 2026).
- L. Abrams and M. Moskowitz, ‘History, sustainability and communities of practice’. Scottish Historical Review, 102(2), pp. 321–326.
- L. Abrams, R. Chapman, L Gardner, M. Moskowitz, and S. Tuckett (2023) 'Introduction: Creativity in Knitted Textiles in Historical Context', Textile, 21:4 (2023), pp.812–9.
- Abrams, L (2023) 'Creativity and design in a contemporary knitwear business: an interview with Di Gilpin and Sheila Greenwell.' Textile, 21:4 (2023) pp.903–11.
- Abrams, L. and Chapman, R, ‘Margaret Klein: designing and making knitwear’. In: Bernat Klein. (The Bernat Klein Foundation: Glasgow, 2022). pp. 70–81.
- Abrams, L. ‘Listening to people speak: the value of oral histories of working people’. Scottish Labour History, 57 (2022) pp. 26–35.
- Abrams L and Gardner, L. ‘Recognising the co-dependence of machine and hand in the Scottish knitwear industry’. Textile History, 52(1–2) (2021), pp. 165–189.
- Abrams, L. Hazley, B. Kearns, A, and Wright, V, ‘Place, Memory and the British High Rise Experience: negotiating social change on the Wyndford Estate, 1962–2015’, Contemporary British History, Vol. 35, Issue 1, pp. 72–91.
- Abrams, L. ‘The self and self-help: women pursuing autonomy in post-war Britain’. Transactions of the Royal Historical Society, 29 (2019), pp. 201–221.
- Abrams, L. ‘Heroes of their own life stories: narrating the female self in the feminist age.’ Cultural and Social History, 16:2 (2019) pp. 205–224
- Abrams, L. Fleming, L. Hazley, B. Kearns, A. Wright, V. ‘Isolated and dependent: women and children in high rise social housing in post-war Glasgow’, Women’s History Review 28:5 (2019) pp.794–813.
- Abrams, L. Hazley, B. Kearns, A. Wright, V. 'People and their homes rather than housing in the usual sense’? Locating the tenant’s voice in Homes in High Flats.’ Women's History Review, 28:5 (2019) pp.728–745.
- Abrams, L. Hazley, B. Kearns, A. Wright, V. ‘Aspiration, agency and the production of new selves in a Scottish new town, c.1947-c.2016’, Twentieth Century British History (2018) 29(4), pp. 576–604.
- Abrams, L. 'Liberating the female self: epiphanies, conflict and coherence in the life stories of post-war British women', Social History 39:1 (2014), pp. 14–35.
- Abrams, L. 'The Taming of Highland Masculinity: Inter-personal Violence and Shifting Codes of Manhood c.1760–1840', Scottish Historical Review 92:1 (2013), pp. 100–122.
- Abrams, L. 'Story-telling, Women’s Authority and the ‘Old Wife’s Tale’: ‘The Story of the Bottle of Medicine’, History Workshop Journal 73:1 (2012), pp. 95–117.
- Abrams, L. "There is many a thing that can be done with money": Women, barter and autonomy in a Scottish Fishing Community', Signs: Journal of Women in Culture and Society 37:3 (2012), pp. 602–9.
- Abrams, L. ‘Revisiting Akenfield: Forty years of an Iconic Text’, Oral History, vol 37:1 (2009), pp.33–42.
- Abrams, L. ‘The ‘Unseamed Picture’: Conflicting Narratives of Women in the Modern European Past’, Gender & History 20:3 (2008), pp. 628–643.
- Abrams, L. ‘Knitting, Autonomy and Identity: the role of hand-knitting in the construction of women’s sense of self in an island community, Shetland c.1850 to 2000’, Textile History 17:2 (2006) pp. 149–65.
- Abrams, L. 'Families of the Imagination: Myths of Scottish Family Life in Scottish Child Welfare Policy', Scottish Tradition 27 (2002), pp. 42–59.
- Abrams L, Hunt, K (eds.) 'Borders and Frontiers in Women's History' in special issue of Women's History Review 9:2, pp.191–200, (2000).
- Abrams, L. “There was Nobody like my Daddy”: Fathers, the Family and the Marginalisation of Men in Modern Scotland’, Scottish Historical Review LXXVIII:2, pp.219–42 (1999).
- Abrams, L. 'The Personification of Inequality: Challenges to Gendered Power Relations in the Nineteenth Century Divorce Court’, Archiv für Sozialgeschichte (1998), pp.41–56.
- Abrams, L. "Whores, Whore-chasers and Swine": The Regulation of Sexuality and the Restoration of Order in the Nineteenth-Century German Divorce Court', Journal of Family History 21:3, pp.267–80 (1996).
- Abrams, L. 'Restabilisierung der Geschlechterverhältnisse: Konstruktion und Repräsentation von Männlichkeit und Weiblichkeit in Scheidungsprozessen des 19. Jahrhunderts', Westfälische Forschungen 45, pp.9–25 (1995).
- Abrams, L. 'Concubinage, Cohabitation and the Law. Class and Gender Relations in Nineteenth Century Germany', Gender & History 5, (1993), pp.81–100.
- Abrams, L. 'Martyrs or Matriarchs? Working-Class Women's Experience of Marriage in Germany before the First World War', Women's History Review 1:3, pp.357–76 (1992).
- Abrams, L. 'From Control to Commercialization. The Emergence of Mass Entertainment in Germany, 1900–1925?', German History 8 , pp.278–93 (1990).
- Abrams, L. 'Drink and the Working Class in Late Nineteenth-Century Bochum', German History 3, pp.3–14 (1986).

== Research reports ==
- Long Term experiences of Tenants in Social Housing in East Kilbride: an Oral History Study (with Linda Fleming), University of Glasgow, 2011.
- ‘Executive Summary: Quarrier’s, Aberlour and Barnard’s Reports: Report for the Scottish Child Abuse Inquiry’ (June 2020)
- ‘Quarrier's Homes, 1930s–1990s: Report for the Scottish Child Abuse Inquiry (June 2020)
- ‘Aberlour Orphanage and Aberlour Child Care Trust, 1930s–1990s: Report for the Scottish Child Abuse Inquiry (June 2020)
- ‘Dr Barnardo's Homes (Dr Barnardo's/Barnardo's Scotland) 1930s–1990s (June 2020)
- ‘Report into the Historic System to Protect and Prevent the Abuse of Children in Care in Scotland, 1948–1995’ (2020)
