= Eustace Chesser =

Scottish psychiatrist and social reformer

- Born: 22 March 1902; Edinburgh, Scotland
- Died: 1973 (aged 70–71)
- Occupations: Psychiatrist, writer

Eustace Chesser (formerly Isaac Chesarkie) (22 March 1902 – 1973) was a Scottish psychiatrist, social reformer and writer.

== Early life ==
Eustace Chesser was born in Edinburgh on 22 March 1902, to Russian immigrants. He educated at George Watson's College and received his medical degree from the University of Edinburgh, in 1926.

== Career ==
Chesser worked for some years as a GP in Cinderford, Manchester and spent part of the Second World War as a clinical assistant at the Tavistock Clinic.

In 1940 he published a sex manual entitled Love Without Fear. It sold 5,000 copies but it was withdrawn, and Chesser was arrested for obscenity. Rather than pleading guilty and accepting a fine, Chesser chose to be tried by jury. Chesser, who pleaded not guilty, was later acquitted. During the course of the trial, three doctors expressed the opinion that the book served a very useful purpose.

In 1959 Chesser resigned from the British Medical Association after the BMA decided that no further copies of a booklet to which he had contributed, entitled 'Getting Married', should be issued. The BMA defended its decision on the grounds that the booklet had been criticised by other doctors who were members of the BMA.

== Dieting ==
Chesser authored the book Slimming for the Million in 1939. He advocated a low-carbohydrate high-protein diet. He recommended bacon, eggs, lean meats and fresh vegetables. He argued that "all sugars should be avoided like the devil", especially chocolate which he described as "one of obesity's biggest allies." His low-carb dieting ideas are a predecessor to the Atkins diet.

A review in the British Medical Journal noted that Chesser's meat or protein diet may be deficient in essential vitamins and concluded that the book "does not seem practical enough for a patient or detailed enough for a doctor."

== Personal life ==
In 1926 Chesser married Rose Morris, with whom he had a son, later the psychiatrist Edward Stewart Chesser, and a daughter, Shirley. Chesser later married Sheila Blayney-Jones, who survived him.

In 1968 Chesser suffered a serious illness which left him physically incapacitated for the remainder of his life.

Following his death, in 1973, a meeting in memory of Chesser was held at the Royal Society of Medicine.

== Bibliography ==
- Slimming for the Million (1939)
- Love Without Fear: a Plain Guide to Sex Technique for Every Married Adult (1940)
- The Practice of Sex Education: A Plain Guide for Parents and Teachers (1944)
- The Unwanted Child (1945)
- Children by Choice (1947) Reissued in 1950 as A Practical Guide to Birth Control
- Grow up - and live (1949)
- Cruelty to Children (1952)
- How to Make a Success of Your Marriage (1952)
- Successful living (1952)
- The Sexual, Marital and Family Relationships of the English Woman (1956)
- Love and Marriage (1957)
- Women (1958)
- An Outline of Human Relationships (1959)
- Odd Man Out: Homosexuality in Men and Women (1959)
- Is Chastity Outmoded? (1960)
- The Cost of Loving (1964)
- Sexual Behavior (1964)
- Shelley & Zastrozzi: Self-Revelation of a Neurotic (1965)
- Unmarried Love (1965)
- Living with Suicide (1967)
- Why Suicide? (1968)
- Sex and the Married Woman (1968)
- Twentieth Century Woman (1969)
- Strange Loves: The Human Aspects of Sexual Deviation (1970)
- Who do you Think You Are? (1970)
- Salvation Through Sex: The Life and Work of Wilhelm Reich (1972)
- Is Marriage Necessary? (1974)
