= List of fellows of the British Academy elected in the 2010s =

The Fellowship of the British Academy consists of world-leading scholars and researchers in the humanities and social sciences, A varying number of fellows are elected each year in July at the academy's annual general meeting.

== 2019 ==
The 2019 annual general meeting was held on 19 July 2019. Elected were 52 fellows, 20 corresponding fellows, and 4 honorary fellows.

Fellows

- Professor Erkko Autio, Professor in Technology Venturing and Entrepreneurship, Imperial College Business School
- Professor Christina Boswell, Professor of Politics, University of Edinburgh
- Professor Laurence Brockliss, Emeritus Professor of Early Modern French History, University of Oxford; Emeritus Fellow, Magdalen College, Oxford
- Professor Charlotte Brunsdon, Professor of Film and Television Studies, University of Warwick
- Professor Harriet Bulkeley, Professor of Geography, Durham University
- Professor Josep Call, Professor in Evolutionary Origins of Mind, University of St Andrews; Director, Budongo (Chimpanzee) Research Unit, Edinburgh Zoo
- The Rev'd Professor Sarah Coakley, Honorary Professor, Logos Institute, University of St Andrews; Norris-Hulse Professor emerita, Faculty of Divinity, University of Cambridge; Professorial Research Fellow, The Institute for Religion and Critical Inquiry, Australian Catholic University
- Professor Gregory Currie, Professor of Philosophy, University of York
- Professor Harri Englund, Professor of Social Anthropology, University of Cambridge
- Professor Geoffrey Evans, Professor of the Sociology of Politics, University of Oxford; Official Fellow, Nuffield College, Oxford
- Professor Lindsay Farmer, Professor of Law, University of Glasgow
- Professor Margot Finn, Professor of Modern British History, University College London
- Dr Annabel Gallop, Head of Southeast Asia section, The British Library
- Professor Peter Gatrell, Professor of Modern History, University of Manchester
- Professor Susan Golombok, Director, Centre for Family Research, University of Cambridge
- Professor Emily Gowers, Professor of Latin Literature, University of Cambridge; Fellow, St John's College, Cambridge
- Professor Stephen Graham, Professor of Cities and Society, Newcastle University
- Professor Louise Gullifer, Professor of Commercial Law, University of Oxford; Fellow, Harris Manchester College, Oxford
- Professor Leslie Hannah, Professor Emeritus, Department of Economic History, London School of Economics
- Professor Clare Harris, Professor of Visual Anthropology, University of Oxford; Curator for Asian Collections, Pitt Rivers Museum
- Professor Rebecca Herissone, Professor of Musicology, University of Manchester
- Professor Caroline Heycock, Professor of Syntax, University of Edinburgh
- Professor Edward Hughes, Professor of French, Queen Mary University of London
- Professor Herminia Ibarra, The Charles Handy Professor of Organisational Behaviour, London Business School
- Professor Susan James, Professor of Philosophy, Birkbeck, University of London
- Professor Deborah James, Professor of Anthropology, London School of Economics
- Professor Andrew Kahn, Professor of Russian Literature, University of Oxford; Fellow and Tutor, St Edmund Hall, Oxford
- Professor Simon Kirby, Professor of Language Evolution, University of Edinburgh
- Professor Matthew Lambon Ralph, Director MRC Cognition and Brain Sciences Unit, University of Cambridge
- Professor David Langslow, Professor of Classics and Hulme Professor of Latin, University of Manchester
- Professor Esther Leslie, Professor of Political Aesthetics, Birkbeck, University of London
- Professor Julia Lovell, Professor of Modern Chinese History and Literature, Birkbeck, University of London
- Professor Helen Margetts, Professor of Society and the Internet, Oxford Internet Institute, University of Oxford; Director, Public Policy Programme, Alan Turing Institute for Data Science and Artificial Intelligence
- Professor Jennifer Mason, Professor of Sociology, University of Manchester
- Dr Margaret Meyer, Official Fellow in Economics, Nuffield College, Oxford
- Professor Nicola Milner, Professor and Head of Department, Department of Archaeology, University of York
- Professor Irina Nikolaeva, Professor of Linguistics, School of Oriental and African Studies, University of London
- Professor Ad Putter, Professor of Medieval English, University of Bristol
- Professor Imran Rasul, Professor of Economics, University College London
- Professor James Raven, Professor of Modern History, University of Essex; Senior Research Fellow of Magdalene College, University of Cambridge
- Professor Alec Ryrie, Professor of the History of Christianity, Durham University
- Professor Katie Scott, Professor in Art History, Courtauld Institute of Art
- Professor Jason Sharman, Sir Patrick Sheehy Professor of International Relations, University of Cambridge
- Dr Alison Sheridan, Principal Archaeological Research Curator, Department of Scottish History and Archaeology, National Museums Scotland (NMS)
- Professor Elizabeth Shove, Professor of Sociology, Lancaster University
- Professor Gerry Simpson, Professor of Public International Law, London School of Economics
- Professor Peter Smith, Professor of Social Statistics, University of Southampton
- Professor Tiffany Stern, Professor of Shakespeare and Early Modern Drama, Shakespeare Institute, University of Birmingham
- Professor Robert Stern, Professor of Philosophy, University of Sheffield
- Professor Andrew Webber, Professor of Modern German and Comparative Culture, University of Cambridge
- Professor Eyal Weizman, Professor of Spatial and Visual Cultures and Director of Forensic Architecture, Goldsmiths, University of London
- Professor Ian Wood, Emeritus Professor of Early Medieval History, University of Leeds

Corresponding fellows

- Professor Gianmario Borio, Professor of Musicology, University of Pavia; Director, Institute for Music, Condazione Giorgio Cini, Venice
- Professor Veena Das, Krieger-Eisenhower Professor of Anthropology, Johns Hopkins University
- Professor Katherine Dunbabin, Professor Emerita, Department of Classics, McMaster University
- Professor Stephen Greenblatt, John Cogan University Professor of the Humanities, Harvard University
- Professor Dr. Dr. h.c. mult. Dieter Grimm, Professor Emeritus, Humboldt University Berlin; Permanent Fellow, Wissenschaftskolleg zu Berlin
- Professor Donna Haraway, Distinguished Professor Emerita, History of Consciousness Department, University of California, Santa Cruz
- Professor Cynthia Hardy, Laureate Professor of Management, University of Melbourne; Professor, Cardiff Business School
- Professor Stephanie Jamison, Distinguished Professor of Asian Languages and Cultures and of Indo-European Studies, University of California, Los Angeles
- Professor Marcia Johnson, Sterling Professor Emerita of Psychology, Yale University
- Professor Ira Katznelson, Ruggles Professor of Political Science and History, Columbia University
- Professor Valerie Kivelson, Thomas N Tentler Collegiate Professor and Arthur F Thurnau Professor of History, University of Michigan
- Professor Michèle Lamont, Robert I Goldman Professor of European Studies, Professor of Sociology and of African and African American Studies, Harvard University
- Professor Hazel Markus, Davis-Brack Professor in the Behavioral Sciences, Stanford University
- Professor Mark Mazower, Ira D Wallach Professor of History, Columbia University
- Professor Terttu Nevalainen, Professor and Research Director, Department of Languages, Faculty of Arts, University of Helsinki
- Professor Ato Quayson, Professor of English, New York University
- Professor Jean Tirole, Professor of Economics, Toulouse School of Economics
- Professor Lyn Wadley, Honorary Professor of Archaeology, Evolutionary Studies Institute, University of the Witwatersrand
- Professor Michael Watts, Class of 63 and Chancellor's Professor of Geography and Development Studies Emeritus, University of California, Berkeley
- Professor Peter Zieme, Senior Researcher, Berlin Brandenburg Academy of Science and Humanities

Honorary fellows

- Sir John Chilcot GCB, PC, Former Permanent Secretary, chair of inquiry into Iraq war
- Michael Frayn FRSL, Freelance writer
- Professor Margaret MacMillan CC, CH, Emeritus Professor of International History, University of Oxford; Professor of History, University of Toronto
- Advocate General Eleanor Sharpston QC, Advocate General, Court of Justice of the European Union

== 2018 ==
The 2018 annual general meeting was held on 20 July 2018. Elected were 52 fellows, 20 corresponding fellows, and 4 honorary fellows: this was a record number of 76 new fellows.

Fellows

- Lynn Abrams, Professor of Modern History, University of Glasgow
- Ben Ansell, Professor of Comparative Democratic Institutions, University of Oxford
- Sarah-Jayne Blakemore, Professor of Cognitive Neuroscience, University College London
- Hagit Borer, chair in Linguistics, Queen Mary University of London
- Richard Bourke, Professor in the History of Political Thought, Queen Mary University of London
- Douglas Cairns, FRSE, Professor of Classics, University of Edinburgh
- Rajesh Chandy, Tony and Maureen Wheeler Chair in Entrepreneurship, and Professor of Marketing, London Business School
- Joya Chatterji, Professor of South Asian History, University of Cambridge
- Brian Cheffins, S. J. Berwin Professor of Corporate Law, University of Cambridge
- Veronica Della Dora, Professor of Human Geography, Royal Holloway, University of London
- Tia DeNora, Professor of Sociology of Music, University of Exeter
- Christopher Evans, executive director, Cambridge Archaeological Unit, University of Cambridge
- James Fairhead, Professor of Anthropology, University of Sussex
- Simon Gaunt, Professor of French Language and Literature, King's College, London
- Maitreesh Ghatak, Professor of Economics, London School of Economics and Political Science
- David Gordon, Professor of Social Justice, University of Bristol
- Catherine Hall, Professor Emerita of Modern British Social and Cultural History, Chair of the Centre for the Study of British Slave-ownership Department of History, University College London
- Canon Professor Carol Harrison, Lady Margaret Professor of Divinity, and Canon of Christ Church Cathedral, University of Oxford
- Martin Jones, George Pitt-Rivers Professor of Archaeological Science, University of Cambridge
- Alison Liebling, Director, Prisons Research Centre; Professor of Criminology and Criminal Justice, University of Cambridge
- Elena Lieven, Professor of Psychology and Director, ESRC International Centre for Language and Communicative Development (LuCiD), University of Manchester
- Jane Lightfoot, Professor of Greek Literature, University of Oxford
- Sonia Livingstone, OBE, Professor of Social Psychology, London School of Economics and Political Science
- Ian Loader, Professor of Criminology, University of Oxford
- Eleanor Maguire, FMedSci, FRS, Hon. MRIA, Professor of Cognitive Neuroscience, University College London
- Peter Marshall, Professor of History, University of Warwick
- Peter Miller, Professor of Management Accounting, London School of Economics and Political Science
- Melinda Mills, MBE, Nuffield Professor of Sociology, University of Oxford
- Niamh Moloney, Professor of Financial Markets Law, London School of Economics and Political Science
- Hervé Moulin, FRSE, D. J. Robertson Chair in Economics, University of Glasgow
- Catherine Nash, Professor of Human Geography, Queen Mary University of London
- Lynda Nead, Pevsner Professor of History of Art, Birkbeck, University of London
- Samir Okasha, Professor of Philosophy of Science, University of Bristol
- Wen-chin Ouyang, Professor of Arabic and Comparative Literature, School of Oriental and African Studies, University of London
- Ian Rumfitt, Senior Research Fellow, All Souls College, Oxford
- David Runciman, Professor of Politics, University of Cambridge
- Timon Screech, Professor of the History of Art, School of Oriental and African Studies, University of London
- Richard Sennett, OBE, Centennial Professor of Sociology, London School of Economics and Political Science; University Professor of the Humanities, New York University
- Tom Shakespeare, Professor of Disability Research, Norwich Medical School, University of East Anglia
- Alexandra Shepard, Professor of Gender History, University of Glasgow
- Helen Small, Professor of English Literature, University of Oxford
- Edmund Sonuga-Barke, FMedSci, Professor of Developmental Psychology, Psychiatry and Neuroscience, King's College London
- Jonathan Spencer, FRSE, Regius Professor of South Asian Language, Culture and Society, University of Edinburgh
- Charles Stafford, Professor of Anthropology, London School of Economics and Political Science
- Fiona Stafford, Professor of English Language and Literature, University of Oxford
- Judith Still, Professor of French and Critical Theory, University of Nottingham
- Victor Tadros, Professor of Law and Legal Theory, University of Warwick
- Silvana Tenreyro, Professor of Economics, London School of Economics and Political Science
- The Reverend Canon Professor David Thomas, Professor of Christianity and Islam, University of Birmingham
- Gill Valentine, Provost and Deputy Vice-Chancellor, University of Sheffield
- Alan Warde, Professor of Sociology, University of Manchester
- Georgina Waylen, Professor of Politics, University of Manchester

Corresponding fellows

- Leslie Aiello, President Emerita, Wenner-Gren Foundation for Anthropological Research, New York
- Orley Ashenfelter, Joseph Douglas Green 1895 Professor of Economics, Princeton University
- Seyla Benhabib, Eugene Meyer Professor of Political Science and Philosophy, Yale University; Senior Fellow, Columbia Center for Contemporary Critical Thought, Columbia University
- Robert Brandom, Distinguished Professor, Philosophy Department, University of Pittsburgh
- Gergely Csibra, Professor, Department of Cognitive Science, Central European University, Budapest
- Okwui Enwezor, Formerly Director, Haus der Kunst, Munich
- Martha Farah, Walter H Annenberg Professor in Natural Sciences and Director, Center for Neuroscience and Society, University of Pennsylvania
- Jean-Louis Ferrary, Directeur d'études émérite à l'École Pratique des Hautes Études
- Jerry A. Hausman, Professor of Economics, Massachusetts Institute of Technology
- Corinne Hofman, Professor of Caribbean Archaeology, and Dean of the Faculty of Archaeology, Leiden University
- Robert Jervis, Adlai E Stevenson Professor of International Politics, Columbia University
- William Chester Jordan, Dayton-Stockton Professor of History, Princeton University
- Peter Lake, University Distinguished Professor of History and Martha Ingram Chair of History, Vanderbilt University
- Bruno Latour, Professor Emeritus, Sciences Po, Paris
- Angelika Neuwirth, Supervisor of the Project "Corpus Coranicum. Dokumentation und historisch-kritischer Kommentar zum Koran" at the Berlin Brandenburgische Akademie der Wissenschaften
- Carlo Ossola, Chaire de Littératures modernes de l'Europe néolatine, Collège de France
- Barbara Partee, Distinguished University Professor Emerita of Linguistics and Philosophy, University of Massachusetts Amherst
- Lucy Riall, Professor of the History of Europe in the World, European University Institute
- Cheryl Saunders, AO, Melbourne Laureate Professor Emeritus and Professorial Fellow, University of Melbourne
- Roberto Unger, Professor of Law, Harvard University

Honorary fellows

- Joan Bakewell, Baroness Bakewell, DBE, writer, broadcaster, author; President of Birkbeck, University of London
- Sir Andrew Dilnot, CBE, Warden Nuffield College, University of Oxford; chair, UK Statistics Authority
- Tony Harrison, Poet, translator and playwright
- Mary-Kay Wilmers, Editor, London Review of Books.

== 2017 ==
The 2017 annual general meeting was held on 21 July 2017. Elected were 42 fellows, 20 corresponding fellows, and 4 honorary fellows.

Fellows

- Franklin Allen, Professor of Finance and Economics and Director, Brevan Howard Centre, Imperial College London
- John Armour, Hogan Lovells Professor of Law and Finance, University of Oxford
- Alison Bashford, Vere Harmsworth Professor of Imperial and Naval History, University of Cambridge; Fellow, Jesus College, Cambridge
- Dauvit Broun FRSE, Professor of Scottish History, University of Glasgow
- Michael Burton, Professor of Psychology, University of York
- Mark Casson, Professor of Economics and Director, Centre for Institutions and Economic History, University of Reading
- Sir Paul Collier CBE, Professor of Economics and Public Policy, Blavatnik School of Government, University of Oxford; Director, International Growth Centre
- Mary Daly, Professor of Sociology and Social Policy, University of Oxford; Fellow, Green Templeton College, Oxford
- Douglas Davies, Professor in the Study of Religion, and Director of the Centre for Death and Life Studies, Durham University
- Paulo de Moraes Farias, Honorary Professor, Department of African Studies and Anthropology, University of Birmingham
- Gillian Douglas, Executive Dean and Professor of Law, The Dickson Poon School of Law, King's College London
- Christian Dustmann, Professor of Economics, and Founding Director CReAM (Centre for Research and Analysis of Migration), University College London
- Jaś Elsner, Professor of Late Antique Art, University of Oxford; Humfry Payne Senior Research Fellow, Corpus Christi College, Oxford
- Gary Gerstle, Paul Mellon Professor of American History, University of Cambridge; Fellow, Sidney Sussex College, Cambridge
- John Gowlett, Professor of Archaeology and Evolutionary Anthropology, University of Liverpool
- Emily Grundy, Professor of Demography, London School of Economics and Political Science
- Sara Hobolt, Sutherland Chair in European Institutions, London School of Economics and Political Science
- Jennifer Hornsby, Professor of Philosophy, Birkbeck, University of London; Co-Director
- Charles Hulme, Professor of Psychology and Education, University of Oxford; William Golding Senior Research Fellow, Brasenose College, Oxford
- Peter Jackson, Professor of Human Geography, University of Sheffield
- Julian Johnson, Regius Professor of Music, Royal Holloway, University of London
- Paul Kerswill, Professor of Sociolinguistics, University of York
- Melissa Leach CBE, Director, Institute of Development Studies (IDS), University of Sussex
- Richard Ned Lebow, Professor of International Political Theory, King's College London; Bye-Fellow, Pembroke College, Cambridge
- Adam Ledgeway, Professor of Italian and Romance Linguistics and Chair of the Faculty of Modern and Medieval Languages, University of Cambridge; Fellow, Downing College, Cambridge
- M. M. McCabe, Professor of Ancient Philosophy Emerita, King's College London; Keeling Scholar in Residence, University College London; Bye-Fellow, Newnham College, Cambridge
- Angela McRobbie FRSA, Professor of Communications, Goldsmiths University of London
- Charles Mitchell, Professor of Law, University College London
- Tariq Modood MBE, Professor of Sociology, Politics and Public Policy, and Director, Research Centre for the Study of Ethnicity and Citizenship, University of Bristol
- Lynne Murray, Professor of Developmental Psychology, University of Reading
- Francesca Orsini, Professor of Hindi and South Asian Literature, SOAS, University of London
- Chakravarthi Ram-Prasad, Professor of Comparative Religion and Philosophy, Lancaster University
- Nicholas Roe, Professor of English Literature, University of St Andrews
- Eugene Rogan, Professor of Modern Middle Eastern History, University of Oxford; Director, Middle East Centre; Fellow, St Antony's College, Oxford
- Ulinka Rublack, Professor of Early Modern European History, University of Cambridge; Fellow, St John's College, Cambridge
- Barbara Sahakian FMedSci, Professor of Clinical Neuropsychology, Department of Psychiatry and MRC/Wellcome Trust Behavioural and Clinical Neuroscience Institute, University of Cambridge
- Andreas Schönle, Professor of Russian, Queen Mary University of London
- Catriona Seth, Marshal Foch Professor of French Literature, University of Oxford; Fellow, All Souls College, Oxford
- Sir Hew Strachan FRSE, Professor of International Relations, University of St Andrews; Emeritus Fellow, All Souls College, Oxford; Life Fellow, Corpus Christi College, Cambridge
- Anna Vignoles, Professor of Education and Director of Research, Faculty of Education, University of Cambridge
- Teresa Webber, University Reader in Palaeography, University of Cambridge; Fellow, Trinity College, Cambridge
- Gregory Woolf, Director, Institute of Classical Studies, School of Advanced Study; Professor of Classics, University of London

Corresponding fellows

- John Agnew, Distinguished Professor of Geography and Italian, University of California, Los Angeles
- Susanne Baer, Justice, Federal Constitutional Court of Germany; Professor of Law and Gender Studies, Humboldt University; William W Cook Global Law Professor, University of Michigan
- Dr h.c. Eszter Bánffy, Director, Romano-Germanic Commission, German Archaeological Institute
- Caroline Walker Bynum, Professor Emerita of Medieval European History, Institute for Advanced Study, Princeton; University Professor Emerita, Columbia University
- William Cronon, Frederick Jackson Turner and Vilas Research Professor of History, Geography and Environmental Studies, University of Wisconsin-Madison
- Marie-Luce Demonet, Emeritus Professor of French literature (Renaissance), Senior Fellow, Institut Universitaire de France, Centre d'Etudes Supérieures de la Renaissance, University François-Rabelais, Tours
- Georges Didi-Huberman, Directeur d'Études à l'École des Hautes Études en Sciences Sociales (Paris)
- Peter Hall, Krupp Foundation Professor of European Studies, Harvard University
- Rebecca Henderson, John and Natty McArthur University Professor, Harvard University; Co-Director, Business & Environment Initiative, Harvard Business School
- Nancy Kanwisher, Walter A Rosenblith Professor of Cognitive Neuroscience, and Investigator, McGovern Institute for Brain Research, Massachusetts Institute of Technology
- Mahmood Mamdani, Herbert Lehman Professor of Government and Professor of Anthropology, Columbia University; Professor and executive director, Makerere Institute of Social Research, Makerere University
- Jay McClelland, Lucie Stern Professor in the Social Sciences, and Director, Center for Mind, Brain, and Computation, Stanford University
- Kenneth Pomeranz, University Professor in History and the College, Professor of East Asian Languages and Civilizations, The University of Chicago
- James Poterba, Mitsui Professor of Economics, Massachusetts Institute of Technology; President, National Bureau of Economic Research
- Claudia Rapp, Professor of Byzantine Studies, University of Vienna
- Ineke Sluiter, Academy Professor, Royal Netherlands Academy of Arts and Sciences (KNAW); Professor of Greek, Leiden University
- Barbara Stollberg-Rilinger, Professor of Early Modern History, Historical Institute, University of Münster
- Cass Sunstein, Robert Walmsley University Professor, Harvard Law School
- Agnès van Zanten, Senior CNRS Research Professor, Centre National de la Recherche Scientifique (CNRS)
- Manfred Woidich, Emeritus Professor of Arabic Language and Linguistics, University of Amsterdam

Honorary Fellows

- Dame Antonia Byatt DBE, CBE, FRSL, novelist
- Graça Machel Hon DBE, Chancellor of the University of Cape Town; President of the School of Oriental and African Studies (SOAS), University of London; Founder and Chair, The Graça Machel Trust
- George Soros, Chairman, Soros Fund Management; Founder and Chairman, Open Society Foundations
- Sir Tom Stoppard OM, CBE, FRSL, Playwright and screenwriter; Cameron Mackintosh Visiting professor of Contemporary Theatre, St Catherine's College, Oxford.

== 2016 ==
The 2016 annual general meeting was held on 14 July 2016. Elected were 42 fellows, 20 corresponding fellows, and 4 honorary fellows.

Fellows

- Trevor Allan
- Julia Barrow
- Stephen Broadberry
- Robin Burgess
- Robyn Carston
- Patricia Clavin
- Sean Connolly
- Steven Connor
- Peter Cooper
- Paul Crossley
- Brian Cummings
- Jonathan Dancy
- Jane Duckett
- Nancy Edwards
- Martin Eimer
- Ewan Ferlie
- Judith Freedman
- Miranda Fricker
- Robert Frost
- Douglas Gale
- Matthew Gandy
- Simon Goldhill
- Hilary Graham CBE
- John Hudson
- Lorna Hutson
- Emily Jackson
- Kelvyn Jones
- Simon Keay
- Susanne Küchler
- Nilli Lavie
- Elizabeth Eva Leach
- Michael MacDonald
- Catherine Merridale
- Catherine Morgan
- Michael Power
- Sophie Scott
- Duncan Snidal
- Judy Wajcman
- Patricia Waugh
- Fiona Williams OBE
- Michael Wright
- Patrick Wright

Corresponding fellows

- Pauline Allen
- Susan Athey
- Peter Bellwood
- Gráinne De Búrca
- Esther Duflo
- Kathleen Eisenhardt
- Laura Engelstein
- Denis Feeney
- Jane M. Jacobs
- George Lewis
- Toril Moi
- Joel Mokyr
- Elizabeth J. Perry
- Derek R. Peterson
- Robert J. Sampson
- Núria Sebastián Gallés
- Wolfgang Streeck
- Sanjay Subrahmanyam
- Judith Thomson
- Michael Walzer

Honorary fellows

- Sir Paul Nurse
- Justice Kate O'Regan
- Lord Sainsbury of Turville
- The Honorable Janet L. Yellen

== 2015 ==
The following fellows of the British Academy were elected at the annual general meeting in 2015:

Fellows

- Janette Atkinson, FMedSci. Emeritus Professor, University College London; Visiting professor, University of Oxford
- Oriana Bandiera, Professor of Economics, Director of STICERD, London School of Economics
- Melanie Bartley, Emeritus Professor of Medical Sociology, University College London
- Christine Bell, Professor of Constitutional Law, Assistant Principal and executive director, Global Justice Academy, University of Edinburgh
- Julia Black, Professor of Law and Pro Director for Research, London School of Economics and Political Science
- Cyprian Broodbank, John Disney Professor of Archaeology and Director, McDonald Institute for Archaeological Research, University of Cambridge
- David Buckingham, Emeritus Professor of Media and Communications, Loughborough University; Visiting professor, Sussex University; Visiting professor, Norwegian Centre for Child Research
- Craig Calhoun, Director and School Professor, London School of Economics
- Michael Carrithers, Professor of Anthropology, Durham University
- Dawn Chatty, Professor of Anthropology and Forced Migration, University of Oxford
- Andy Clark, FRSE. Professor of Logic and Metaphysics, University of Edinburgh
- Thomas Corns, Emeritus Professor of English Literature, Bangor University
- Elizabeth Edwards, Professor of Photographic History, Director of Photographic History Research Centre, De Montfort University
- Briony Fer, Professor of Art History, University College London
- Garth Fowden, Sultan Qaboos Professor of Abrahamic Faiths, University of Cambridge
- Robert Fowler, Henry Overton Wills Professor of Greek, University of Bristol
- Jonardon Ganeri, Professorial Research Associate, Department of the Study of Religions, School of Oriental and African Studies, London; Recurrent Visiting professor, Department of Philosophy, King's College London
- Andrew Gerstle, Professor of Japanese Studies, School of Oriental and African Studies, University of London
- Robert Gordon, Serena Professor of Italian, University of Cambridge; Fellow, Gonville and Caius College, Cambridge
- Sanjeev Goyal, Professor of Economics, University of Cambridge; Fellow, Christ's College, Cambridge
- Felicity Heal, Emeritus Fellow, Jesus College, Oxford
- Michael Heffernan, Professor of Historical Geography, University of Nottingham
- Almut Hintze, Zartoshty Brothers Professor of Zoroastrianism, School of Oriental and African Studies, University of London
- John M. Hobson, Professor of Politics and International Relations, University of Sheffield
- James Hurford, Emeritus Professor of General Linguistics, University of Edinburgh
- Robert Ladd, Emeritus Professor of Linguistics, University of Edinburgh
- Michael Lobban, Professor of Legal History, London School of Economics and Political Science
- Peter Mandler, Professor of Modern Cultural History, University of Cambridge; Bailey Lecturer in History, Gonville and Caius College, Cambridge
- Rana Mitter, Professor of the History and Politics of Modern China, Deutsche Bank Director of the University China Centre, University of Oxford
- Kia Nobre, Director, Oxford Centre for Human Brain Activity (OHBA); Professor of Translational Cognitive Neuroscience, University of Oxford
- Andy Orchard, Rawlinson and Bosworth Professor of Anglo-Saxon, University of Oxford; Fellow, Pembroke College, Oxford
- Michael Parker Pearson, Professor of British Later Prehistory, Institute of Archaeology, University College London
- Stephen Reicher, Professor of Psychology, University of St Andrews
- Gillian Rose, Professor of Cultural Geography, The Open University
- Cheryl Schonhardt-Bailey, Professor in Political Science, London School of Economics
- Sally Shuttleworth, Professor of English Literature, University of Oxford; Professorial Fellow, St Anne's College, Oxford
- Simon Swain, Professor of Classics and Greco-Arabic Studies, Pro-Vice-Chancellor (Arts and Social Sciences), University of Warwick
- Nicholas Tarrier, Professor of Clinical Psychology and eHealth Studies, King's College London
- Annette Volfing, Professor of Medieval German Literature, University of Oxford; Fellow, Oriel College, Oxford
- Joachim Whaley, Professor of German History and Thought, University of Cambridge; Fellow, Gonville and Caius College, Cambridge
- Richard Widdess, Professor of Musicology, School of Oriental and African Studies, University of London
- Hugh Willmott, Professor of Management, Cass Business School, City University London; Research Professor in Organization Studies, Cardiff Business School

Corresponding fellows

- Philippe Aghion, Robert C Waggoner Professor of Economics, Harvard University; Professeur au College de France sur la Chaire d Economie des Institutions, de l'Innovation, et de la Croissance; Centennial Professor of Economics, London School of Economics
- Mahzarin Banaji, Richard Clarke Cabot Professor of Social Ethics, Harvard University
- Lina Bolzoni, Professor of Italian Literature, Scuola Normale Superiore, Pisa
- Joan Bresnan, Sadie Dernham Patek Professor in Humanities, Emerita, Professor of Linguistics, Emerita, and Senior Researcher, CSLI, Stanford University
- Judith Butler, Maxine Elliot Professor of Comparative Literature and Critical Theory, University of California, Berkeley
- Martha Crenshaw, Senior Fellow, Center for International Security and Cooperation (CISAC), Freeman Spogli Institute for International Studies; Professor of Political Science, Stanford University
- Natalio Fernández Marcos, Professor Vinculado ad Honorem, CSIC (Consejo Superior de Investigaciones Científicas), Centro de Ciencias Humanas y Sociales
- Meric Gertler, President, University of Toronto
- Miltiades Hatzopoulos, Formerly Director of the Institute of Greek and Roman Antiquity (KERA), Athens
- Peter Katzenstein, Walter S Carpenter Jr Professor of International Relations, Cornell University
- Christine Korsgaard, Arthur Kingsley Porter Professor of Philosophy, Harvard University
- Michael Mann, Distinguished Professor of Sociology, University of California, Los Angeles; Honorary Professor, University of Cambridge
- Judith Olszowy-Schlanger, Professor of Hebrew and Judaeo-Arabic Manuscript Studies, Ecole Pratique des Hautes Etudes
- Alexander Potts, Max Loehr Collegiate Professor of History of Art, University of Michigan
- Simon Schama, University Professor of History and Art History, Columbia University
- Elizabeth Spelke, Marshall L Berkman Professor of Psychology, Harvard University
- Jane Stapleton, Research Professor of Law, College of Law, Australian National University; Ernest E Smith Professor of Law, University of Texas
- Alain Supiot, Professor, Chaire État social et mondialisation, Collège de France, Paris
- André Vauchez, Emeritus Professor of History of the Middle Ages, University of Paris-Ouest-Nanterre; Former Director of the Ecole Française de Rome
- Jane Waldfogel, Compton Foundation Centennial Professor of Social Work, Columbia University School of Social Work; Visiting professor, Centre for Analysis of Social Exclusion (CASE), London School of Economics

Honorary Fellows

- Dame Lynne Brindley DBE, FRSA. Master of Pembroke College, Oxford
- Dame Carol Ann Duffy DBE, FRSL. Professor of Contemporary Poetry and Creative Director of the Manchester Writing School, Manchester Metropolitan University; Poet Laureate
- Sir John Eliot Gardiner CBE. Founder and artistic director of the Monteverdi Choir, the English Baroque Soloists and the Orchestre Révolutionnaire et Romantique

== 2014 ==
The following fellows of the British Academy were elected at the annual general meeting in 2014:

- Roger Backhouse, Professor of the History and Philosophy of Economics, University of Birmingham; Part-time Erasmus, University of Rotterdam
- Richard Bentall, Professor of Clinical Psychology, University of Liverpool
- Francesco Billari, Professor of Sociology and Demography, University of Oxford; Fellow, Nuffield College, Oxford
- Susanne Bobzien, Professor of Philosophy, University of Oxford; Senior Research Fellow, All Souls College
- Georgina Born, Professor of Music and Anthropology, University of Oxford; Fellow, Mansfield College, Oxford; Bloch Visiting professor of music, University of California, Berkeley
- Joanna Bourke, Professor of History, Birkbeck, University of London
- Margaret Brazier, OBE. Professor of Law, University of Manchester
- Susan Brigden, Langford Fellow and Tutor in History, Lincoln College Oxford; Reader in History, University of Oxford
- Peter Buckley, OBE. Professor of International Business, University of Leeds; Cheung Kong Scholar Chair Professor, University of International Business and Economics, Beijing
- Matthew Collins, Professor of Biomolecular Archaeology, University of York
- David Crouch, Professor of Medieval History, University of Hull
- John Curtice, Professor of Politics, University of Strathclyde
- Sarah Curtis, Professor of Health and Risk and executive director, Institute of Hazard, Risk and Resilience, Durham University
- David Denison, Smith Professor of English Language and Medieval Literature, University of Manchester
- Ingrid De Smet, Professor of French and Neo-Latin Studies, University of Warwick
- Eleanor Dickey, Professor of Classics, University of Reading
- Katrin Flikschuh, Professor of Modern Political Theory, London School of Economics
- Gavin Flood, Professor of Hindu Studies and Comparative Religion, University of Oxford; Academic Director, Oxford Centre for Hindu Studies
- Marina Frolova-Walker, Professor of Music History, Faculty of Music, University of Cambridge; Fellow, Clare College, Cambridge
- Anne Fuchs, Professor of German Studies, University of Warwick
- Tamar Garb, Durning Lawrence Professor in the History of Art, University College London
- Susan Gathercole, MRC Research Professor, University of Cambridge; Director, MRC Cognition and Brain Sciences Unit, Cambridge
- Paul Gilroy, Professor of American and English Literature, King's College London
- Patrick Haggard, Professor of Cognitive Neuroscience, University College London
- Stephen Halliwell, FRSE. Professor of Greek, University of St Andrews
- Francesca Happé, Professor of Cognitive Neuroscience, Director and Head of Department, MRC Social, Genetic and Developmental Psychiatry Centre, Institute of Psychiatry, King's College London
- Henrietta Harrison, Professor of Modern Chinese Studies, University of Oxford
- Jeremy Horder, Professor of Criminal Law, London School of Economics
- Matthew Kramer, Professor of Legal and Political Philosophy, University of Cambridge; Fellow, Churchill College, Cambridge
- Neil Lazarus, Professor of English and Comparative Literary Studies, University of Warwick
- Rae Langton, Professor of Philosophy, University of Cambridge; Fellow, Newnham College, Cambridge
- Judith Lieu, Lady Margaret's Professor of Divinity, University of Cambridge; Fellow, Robinson College, Cambridge
- Christian List, Professor of Political Science and Philosophy, London School of Economics
- Jane Millar, OBE. Professor of Social Policy and Pro-Vice Chancellor (Research), University of Bath
- Ann Phoenix, Professor of Education, Institute of Education, University of London
- Carol Propper, CBE. Professor of Economics, Imperial College Business School; Professor of Economics of Public Policy, University of Bristol
- Tony Prosser, Professor of Public Law, University of Bristol Law School; Visiting professor, College of Europe, Bruges
- Charlotte Roberts, Professor of Archaeology, Durham University
- Stephen Smith, Senior Research Fellow, All Souls College, Oxford; Professor of History, University of Oxford; Honorary Research Professor, Department of History, University of Essex.
- Cecilia Trifogli, Professor of Medieval Philosophy, University of Oxford; Fellow, All Souls College, Oxford
- Dimitri Vayanos, Professor of Finance, London School of Economics
- Sarah Whatmore, Professor of Environment and Public Policy, University of Oxford; Fellow, Keble College, Oxford

== 2013 ==
The following fellows of the British Academy were elected at the annual general meeting in 2013:

- Dominic Abrams, Professor of Social Psychology and Director of the Centre for the Study of Group Processes, University of Kent
- Roderick Beaton, Koraes Professor of Modern Greek and Byzantine History, Language and Literature and Director of the Centre for Hellenic Studies, King's College London
- Sarah Birch, Chair of Comparative Politics, University of Glasgow
- Paul Boyle, Chief Executive, Economic and Social Research Council; President, Science Europe and Professor of Geography, University of St Andrews
- Michael Braddick, Professor of History and Pro-Vice-Chancellor, University of Sheffield
- Michael Bridge, Cassel Professor of Commercial Law, London School of Economics
- Stella Bruzzi, Professor of Film and Television Studies, University of Warwick
- Martin Butler, Professor of Renaissance Drama, University of Leeds
- Mary Dalrymple, Professor of Syntax, University of Oxford
- Hastings Donnan, Professor of Social Anthropology and Director of the Institute for the Study of Conflict Transformation and Social Justice, Queen's University Belfast
- Stuart Elden, Professor of Political Geography, Durham University
- Katharine Ellis, Stanley Hugh Badock Professor of Music, University of Bristol
- David Fergusson, Professor of Divinity and Principal of New College, University of Edinburgh
- Eilís Ferran, Professor of Company and Securities Law, and J. M. Keynes Fellow and Professorial Fellow of St Catharine's College, University of Cambridge
- John Gardner, Professor of Jurisprudence and Fellow of University College, University of Oxford
- Vincent Gillespie, J. R. R. Tolkien Professor of English, University of Oxford
- Usha Goswami, Professor of Cognitive Developmental Neuroscience, Director of the Centre for Neuroscience in Education and Fellow of St John's College, University of Cambridge
- John Hawthorne, Waynflete Professor of Metaphysical Philosophy and Fellow of Magdalen College, University of Oxford; Visiting professor, Princeton University
- Richard Hunter, Regius Professor of Greek and Fellow of Trinity College, University of Cambridge
- Ronald Hutton, Professor of History, University of Bristol
- Glynis Jones, Professor of Archaeology, University of Sheffield
- John Kerrigan, Professor of English 2000 and Fellow of St John's College, University Cambridge
- Diana Knight, Professor of French, University of Nottingham
- Cécile Laborde, Professor of Political Theory and Director of the Legal and Political Theory Programme, University College London
- Julia Lee-Thorp, Professor of Archaeological Science, University of Oxford
- John Lowden, Professor of History of Art, Courtauld Institute of Art, University of London
- Colin Mayer, Peter Moores Professor of Management Studies, Saïd Business School and Fellow of Wadham College, University of Oxford
- David Mosse, Professor of Social Anthropology & Head of department, School of Oriental and African Studies, University of London
- Kevin O’Rourke, Chichele Professor of Economic History and Fellow of All Souls College, University of Oxford
- Jenny Ozga, Professor of the Sociology of Education, University of Oxford
- Christopher Page, Professor of Medieval Music and Literature and Fellow of Sidney Sussex College, University of Cambridge
- Lindsay Paterson, Professor of Education Policy, University of Edinburgh
- Lucrezia Reichlin, Professor of Economics, London Business School
- Hamid Sabourian, Professor of Economics and Game Theory, and Fellow of King's College, University of Cambridge
- Joanne Scott, Professor of European Law, University College London
- Timothy Shallice, Emeritus Professor of Neuropsychology, University College London; Senior Professor, SISSA, Trieste
- David Soskice, School Professor of Political Science and Economics, London School of Economics
- Gareth Stedman Jones, Professor of the History of Ideas, Queen Mary, University of London; Director of the Centre for History and Economics and Fellow of King's College, University of Cambridge
- Roel Sterckx, Joseph Needham Professor of Chinese History, Science and Civilization and Fellow of Clare College, University of Cambridge
- Hans van de Ven, Professor of Modern Chinese History, University of Cambridge
- Jane Wardle, FMedSci. Professor of Clinical Psychology and Director, University College London
- Janet Watson, Chair in Language, University of Leeds

== 2012 ==
The following fellows of the British Academy were elected at the annual general meeting in 2012:

- Peter Biller, Professor of History, University of York
- Julian Birkinshaw, Professor of Strategic and International Management, London Business School
- Oliver Braddick, FMedSci. Emeritus Professor of Experimental Psychology, University of Oxford
- Chris Brewin, Professor of Clinical Psychology, UCL
- Chris Carey, Professor of Greek, UCL
- Nick Chater, Professor of Behavioural Science, University of Warwick
- Gillian Clark, Professor Emerita and Senior Research Fellow, University of Bristol
- Harry Collins, Distinguished Research Professor, Cardiff University
- Vincent Crawford, Drummond Professor of Political Economy, University of Oxford
- John Darwin, Beit Lecturer in the History of the Commonwealth, University of Oxford
- Robin Dennell, Professor Emeritus, University of Sheffield; Visiting Research Fellow, Chinese Academy of Sciences
- Richard Dyer, Professor of Film Studies, King's College London; Professorial Fellow in Film Studies, University of St Andrews
- Simon Franklin, Professor of Slavonic Studies, University of Cambridge
- Knud Haakonssen, Emeritus Professor of Intellectual History, University of Sussex
- Julian Hoppit, Astor Professor of British History, UCL
- Jane Humphries, Professor of Economic History, University of Oxford
- Peter Jackson, Emeritus Professor of Medieval History, Keele University
- Michael Keating, Professor of Politics, University of Aberdeen
- Hugh Kennedy, Professor of Arabic, School of Oriental and African Studies
- Kathleen Kiernan, OBE. Professor of Social Policy and Demography, University of York
- Robert Layton, Emeritus Professor of Anthropology, University of Durham
- Julian Le Grand, Richard Titmuss Professor of Social Policy, London School of Economics
- Nigel Leask, Regius Professor of English Language and Literature, University of Glasgow
- Alain de Libera (corresponding fellow), Full Professor of History of Medieval Philosophy, University of Geneva
- Peter Mack, Director of the Warburg Institute
- Miles Ogborn, Professor of Geography, University of London
- David Parker, Edward Cadbury Professor of Theology, University of Birmingham
- Huw Price, Bertrand Russell Professor of Philosophy, University of Cambridge
- Simon Schaffer, Professor of History of Science, University of Cambridge
- David Solkin, Walter H. Annenberg Professor of History of Art, University of London
- Martin Stokes, Professor of Music, University of Oxford
- Charles Tripp, Professor of Politics with reference to Middle East, SOAS
- Claudio Vita-Finzi, Research Associate, Natural History Museum
- Neil Walker, Regius Professor of Public Law and the Law of Nature and Nations, University of Edinburgh
- Helen Watanabe-O’Kelly, Professor of German Literature, University of Oxford
- Paul Whiteley, Professor of Government, University of Essex
- Bencie Woll, Professor of Sign Language and Deaf Studies, UCL
- Neil Wrigley, Professor of Geography, University of Southampton
- Lucia Zedner, Professor of Criminal Justice, University of Oxford

== 2011 ==
The following fellows of the British Academy were elected at the annual general meeting in 2011:

- Dionisius Agius, Al Qasimi Professor of Arabic Studies and Islamic Material Culture, University of Exeter
- Robin Alexander, Fellow of Wolfson College, University of Cambridge; Professor of Education Emeritus, University of Warwick
- John Baines, Professor of Egyptology, University of Oxford
- Timothy Barnes, FRSC. Honorary Professorial Fellow, School of Divinity, University of Edinburgh; Professor Emeritus of Classics, University of Toronto
- Gordon Campbell, Professor of Renaissance Studies, University of Leicester
- Janet Carsten, Professor of Social and Cultural Anthropology, University of Edinburgh
- Jenny Cheshire, Professor of Linguistics, Queen Mary University of London
- Robert Crawford, Professor of Modern Scottish Literature, School of English, University of St Andrews
- Martin Cripps, Professor of Economics, University College London
- Nicholas De Lange, DD. Professor of Hebrew and Jewish Studies, University of Cambridge
- Felix Driver, Professor of Human Geography, Royal Holloway, University of London
- Cécile Fabre, Professor of Political Philosophy and Tutorial Fellow in Philosophy at Lincoln College, University of Oxford
- Simon Frith, Tovey Professor of Music, University of Edinburgh
- Raymond Geuss, Professor of Philosophy, University of Cambridge
- Robert Gordon, Regius Professor of Hebrew, University of Cambridge
- Ruth Harris, Professor in Modern History, Fellow and Tutor at New College, University of Oxford
- John Healey, Professor of Semitic Studies, University of Manchester
- Simon Hix, Professor of European and Comparative Politics, LSE
- Sylvia Huot, Professor of Medieval French Literature, Fellow Pembroke College, University of Cambridge
- Andrew Hurrell, Montague Burton Professor of International Relations, University of Oxford
- Mark Johnson, Director, Centre for Brain and Cognitive Development, Birkbeck, University of London
- Neil Kenny, Reader in Early Modern French Literature and Thought, University of Cambridge
- Jeremy Lawrance, Professor of Spanish Golden Age Studies, University of Nottingham
- Martin Loughlin, Professor of Public Law and Head, Department of Law, LSE
- Neil Macrae, Professor in Psychology, University of Aberdeen
- Antony Manstead, Professor of Psychology, Cardiff University
- Laura Marcus, Goldsmiths’ Professor of English Literature, University of Oxford
- Alan Norrie, Professor of Law, University of Warwick
- Susan Owens, OBE. Professor of Environment and Policy, Head of Department of Geography and Professorial Fellow of Newnham College, University of Cambridge
- Andrea Prat, Professor of Economics, London School of Economics and STICERD
- Hélène Rey, Professor of Economics, London Business School
- Lyndal Roper, Regius Professor of Modern History, Oriel College, University of Oxford
- William Rowe, Anniversary Professor of Poetics, Birkbeck, University of London
- Carolyn Steedman, Professor of History, University of Warwick
- Jeremy Waldron, Chichele Professor of Social and Political Theory, University of Oxford; University Professor and Professor of Law, New York University
- Alan Walker, Professor of Social Policy and Social Gerontology, University of Sheffield
- Arne Westad, Professor of International History, London School of Economics and Political Science
- Per-Olof Wikström, Professor of Ecological and Developmental Criminology, University of Cambridge

Corresponding fellows

- David Blackbourn, Coolidge Professor of History, Harvard University.
- Michael Cook, Class of 1943 University Professor of Near Eastern Studies, Princeton University.
- William Courtenay, Hilldale Professor and Charles Homer Haskins Professor Emeritus, University of Wisconsin-Madison.
- Denis Crouzet, Professor of Modern History, Université Paris Sorbonne.
- Nicholas Evans, Head of Linguistics, School of Culture, History and Language, College of Asia-Pacific, Australian National University.
- Susan Fiske, Eugene Higgins Professor of Psychology, Princeton University.
- Patrick Geary, Distinguished Professor of History, University of California, Los Angeles.
- Jane Ginsburg, Morton L. Janklow Professor of Literary and Artistic Property Law, Columbia University.
- William Harris, Professor of History and Director of the Center for the Ancient Mediterranean, Columbia University.
- Kirsten Hastrup, Professor of Anthropology, University of Copenhagen.
- Will Kymlicka, Canada Research Chair in Political Philosophy, Queen's University, Canada.
- Patrick Le Galès, CNRS Research Professor, Centre d’Etudes Européennes, Sciences Po Paris.
- Chiara Saraceno, Forschungsprofessorin, Wissenschaftszentrum Berlin für Sozialforschung.
- Thomas Sargent, Senior Fellow, Hoover Institution, Stanford University; Professor of Economics, New York University.
- Michael Wood, Charles Barnwell Straut Class of 1923 Professor of English and Comparative Literature, Princeton University.

Honorary fellows

- Sir Tim Berners-Lee, OM, KBE, FRS, FREng, Director, World Wide Web Consortium; 3Com Founders Professor, MIT Computer Science and Artificial Intelligence Laboratory.
- Sir Richard Brook, OBE, ScD, FREng, Emeritus Professor, Department of Materials, University of Oxford; Formerly Director of The Leverhulme Trust.

== 2010 ==
The following fellows of the British Academy were elected at the annual general meeting in 2010:

- David Abulafia, Professor of Mediterranean History, University of Cambridge
- Alan Baker, Life Fellow, Emmanuel College, University of Cambridge
- Alan Barnard, Professor of the Anthropology of Southern Africa, University of Edinburgh
- Mary Beard, Professor of Classics, University of Cambridge
- Jonathan Bradshaw, CBE. Professor of Social Policy, University of York
- Francesco Caselli, Professor of Economics, London School of Economics
- Christopher Clark, Professor of Modern European History, University of Cambridge
- Eric F. Clarke, Heather Professor of Music, University of Oxford
- Rosemary Crompton, Professor Emeritus, City University
- Stephen Daniels, Professor of Cultural Geography, University of Nottingham
- Neil Duxbury, Professor of Law, London School of Economics
- Anke Ehlers, Professor of Experimental Psychopathology and Wellcome Principal Research Fellow, King's College London
- James Fawcett, Professor of International Commercial Law, University of Nottingham
- Conor Gearty, Professor of Human Rights Law, London School of Economics
- Robert Gildea, Professor of Modern History, University of Oxford
- John Gledhill, Max Gluckman Professor of Social Anthropology, University of Manchester
- Cecilia Heyes, Senior Research Fellow of All Souls College and Professor of Psychology, University of Oxford
- Deborah Howard, Professor of Architectural History; Fellow, St John's College, University of Cambridge
- Terence Irwin, Professor of Ancient Philosophy; Fellow, Keble College, University of Oxford
- Colin Kidd, Professor of Modern History, University of Glasgow
- Anthony King, Essex County Council Millennium Professor of British Government, University of Essex
- Aditi Lahiri, Professor of Linguistics, University of Oxford
- Shalom Lappin, Professor of Computational Linguistics, King's College London
- Richard Little, Professor Emeritus in International Politics, University of Bristol
- Graham Loomes, Professor of Economics, University of Warwick
- Andrew Louth, Professor of Patristic and Byzantine Studies, University of Durham
- Juliet Mitchell, Director, Expanded Programme in Theoretical Psychoanalysis, University College London; Honorary Senior Research Associate, Dept of Geography and Professor Emerita, Psychoanalysis and Gender Studies; Fellow Emeritus, Jesus College, University of Cambridge
- Karalyn Patterson, FMedSci. Senior Research Associate, Department of Clinical Neurosciences, University of Cambridge
- Nicholas Penny, Director, The National Gallery
- Emilie Savage-Smith, Professor of the History of Islamic Science, Senior Research Consultant, The Bodleian Library; Archivist (Fellow Archivist), St Cross College, University of Oxford
- Michael Sheringham, Marshal Foch Professor of French Literature, University of Oxford
- Roland R. R. Smith, Lincoln Professor of Classical Archaeology and Art, University of Oxford
- Anthony Thiselton, Professor of Christian Theology, University of Nottingham; Emeritus Professor, University of Chester
- John Van Reenen, Professor of Economics; Director, Centre for Economic Performance, London School of Economics
- Nicholas Vincent, Professor of Medieval History, University of East Anglia
- Andrew Wallace-Hadrill, OBE. Master of Sidney Sussex College, University of Cambridge
- Stephen White, James Bryce Professor of Politics, University of Glasgow
- Henry Woudhuysen, Professor of English Language and Literature; Dean, Faculty of Arts and Humanities, University College London

Corresponding fellows

- Kofi Agawu, Professor of Music, Princeton University; Adjunct Professor, The University of Ghana, Legon.
- Peter Brooks, Sterling Professor Emeritus of Comparative Literature, Yale University; Andrew W. Mellon Foundation Scholar in the University Center for Human Values and the Department of Comparative Literature, Princeton University.
- Janet Browne, Aramont Professor of the History of Science, Harvard University.
- Francis X. Clooney, Parkman Professor of Divinity and Comparative Theology, Harvard Divinity School.
- Lorraine Daston, Director, Max Planck Institute for the History of Science; Visiting professor in the Committee on Social Thought, University of Chicago.
- Stanislas Dehaene, Professor, Collège de France; Directeur, INSERM-CEA Cognitive Neuroimaging Unit.
- Philippe Descola, Professor, Collège de France; Director of Studies, École des Hautes Études en Sciences Sociales, Paris.
- Gøsta Esping-Andersen, Icrea Academia Professor of Sociology, Universita Pompeu Fabra.
- Michael F. Goodchild, Professor of Geography, University of California, Santa Barbara.
- James Gordley, W.R. Irby Professor of Law, Tulane University Law School.
- Paul Kiparsky, Robert M. and Anne T. Bass Professor in the School of Humanities and Sciences, Stanford University.
- Guy Laroque, Head of Laboratoire de Macroéconomie, INSEE-CREST; Professor of Economics, University College London.
- Hermann Parzinger, Dr. H.C. Mult. President, Prussian Cultural Heritage Foundation.
- Robert O. Keohane, Professor of International Affairs, Princeton University.
- Justin Yifu Lin, Chief Economist and Senior Vice-President, World Bank; on leave from Peking University.

Honorary fellows

- Lord Bragg of Wigton, FRS, FRSL, FRTS. Chancellor, University of Leeds; independent writer and broadcaster.
