= Harriet Hawkins =

British cultural geographer and professor

Harriet Hawkins FRGS
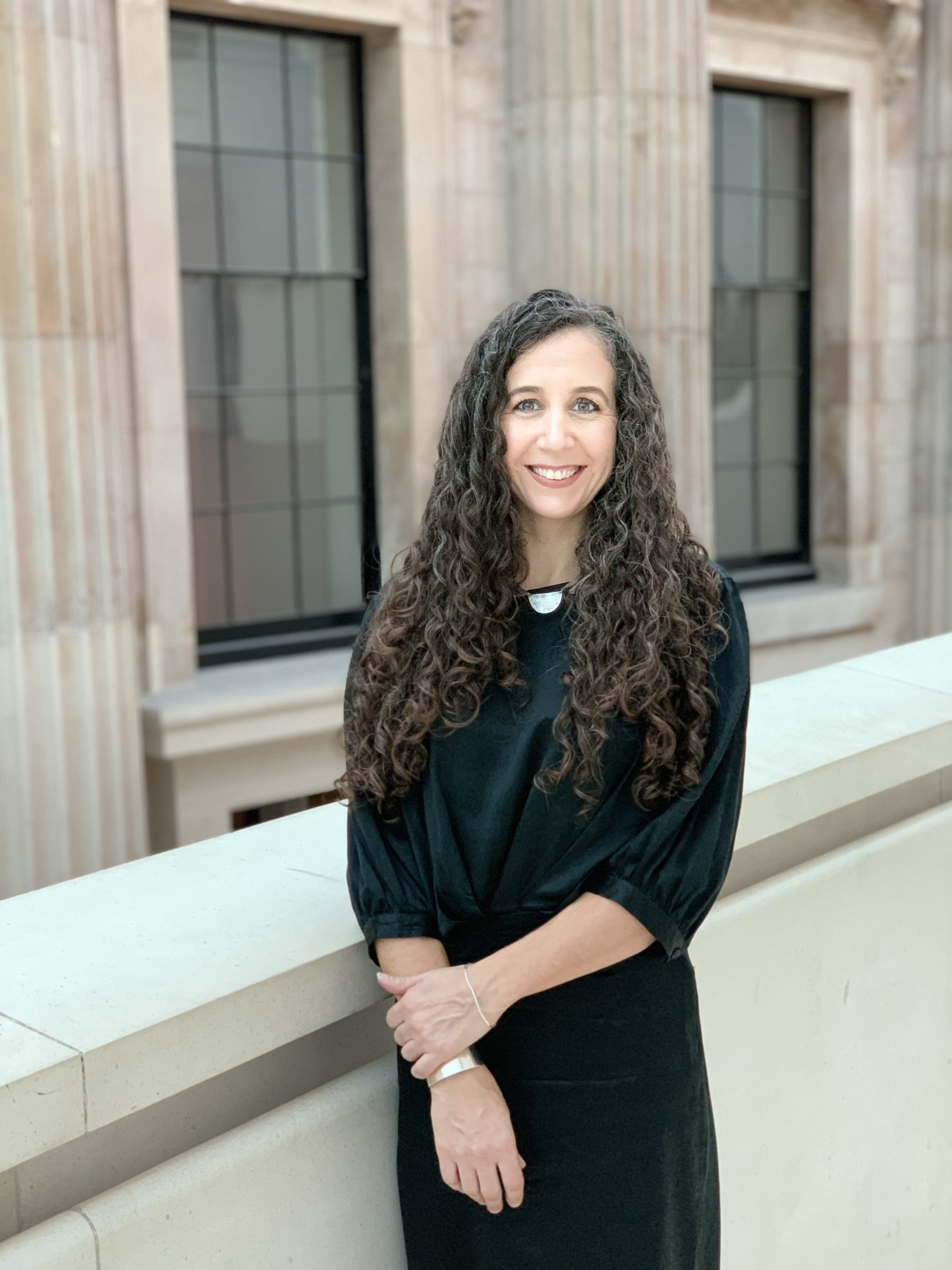
- Hawkins at British Museum in 2019
- Born: 1980 (age 45–46)
- Awards: Philip Leverhulme Prize (2016)

Academic background
- Education: University of Nottingham
- Thesis: Geographies of Art and Rubbish (2006)
- Doctoral advisor: Stephen Daniels

Academic work
- Discipline: Geography
- Sub-discipline: Cultural geography; Geohumanities
- Institutions: Royal Holloway, London; University of Bristol; University of Exeter
- Doctoral students: Nelly Ben Hayoun; Tania El Khoury
- Main interests: Geohumanities; geographies of art works and arts worlds; aesthetics; creative geographies
- Notable works: For Creative Geographies (2013); Creativity (2016); Geography, Art, Research: Artistic Research in the GeoHumanities (2020)
- Website: harriethawkins.com

Harriet Hawkins FRGS (born 1980) is a British cultural geographer. She is Professor of Cultural Geography at Royal Holloway, University of London, where she was the founding co-director of the Centre for Geohumanities (with Veronica Della Dora). As part of Research Excellence Framework 2021, she was a member of the Geography and Environmental Studies expert sub-panel. In 2016, she was winner of a Philip Leverhulme Prize and the Royal Geographical Society Gill Memorial Award. In 2019, she was awarded a five-year European Research Council grant, as part of the Horizon 2020 research and innovation programme. She was previously the Chair of the Royal Geographical Society Social and Cultural Geography Research Group.

== Career ==
Hawkins' research is focused on the advancement of the geohumanities, a field that sits at the intersection of geographical scholarship with arts and humanities scholarship and practice. Empirically, she explores the geographies of art works and art worlds.

She was educated at the University of Nottingham, where she completed a Bachelor of Arts degree in geography with first-class honours (winning the School of Geography Prize and the Edwards Prize), a Master of Arts degree in landscape and culture, and a Doctor of Philosophy degree examining the geographies of art and rubbish, funded by the Arts and Humanities Research Council (AHRC), and supervised by Stephen Daniels. After leaving Nottingham, she held AHRC Research Fellowships at the University of Exeter and Aberystwyth University, and was a lecturer at the University of Bristol, before arriving at Royal Holloway, University of London in 2012. She was promoted to professor in 2016.

At Royal Holloway, she was also founding co-director of the Centre for the Geohumanities with Veronica Della Dora. The centre connects arts and humanities scholars and practitioners, geographers and the creative and cultural sectors. It encourages work with an arts and humanities perspective on issues that have a strong geographical resonance, such as space, place, landscape, and environment. Its over 50 members include: Felix Driver, Robert Hampson, Julian Johnson, and Jo Shapcott.

Between 2019 and 2023, she served as the Director of the Technē AHRC Doctoral Training Partnership which awards 60 doctoral studentships per year, across nine academic institutions in London and the South East of England, in partnership with organisations such as Historic Royal Palaces, the Institute of Contemporary Arts, the National Theatre and the Victoria and Albert Museum.

She is also managing editor of the journal Cultural Geographies, and founding associate editor of GeoHumanities. She was the Chair of the Royal Geographical Society Social and Cultural Geography Research Group, and is currently a Panel Chair for the United Kingdom Research and Innovation Future Leader Fellowships Peer Review College. She was appointed member of the Geography and Environmental Studies expert sub-panel for the 2021 UK Research Excellence Framework assessment.

She has delivered over 70 invited lectures, keynotes and plenaries in 16 countries, and examined over 35 doctoral theses in nine countries. In April 2019, Hawkins delivered the Cultural Geographies Annual Lecture, titled Going Underground: Creating Subterranean Imaginations, at the American Association of Geographers Annual Meeting in Washington, DC. In July 2020, she will be a plenary speaker at The Institute of Australian Geographers annual conference. She went on in 2023 to deliver the Raymond F. West Memorial Lecture at Stanford University with the title, Imagine! Creating Earth Futures?, also appearing in front of a live audience on the Philosophy Talk podcast/radio program.

In December 2019, it was announced that Hawkins was one of 301 researchers, across all disciplines and from 24 countries, selected from 2,453 applicants for the award of a prestigious five-year European Research Council Consolidator Grant, as part of the Horizon 2020 research and innovation programme, for her project Thinking Deep – Novel creative approaches to the underground, providing funding of up to €2 million. This was followed by a European Research Council Proof of Concept grant in 2024.

== Honours and awards ==
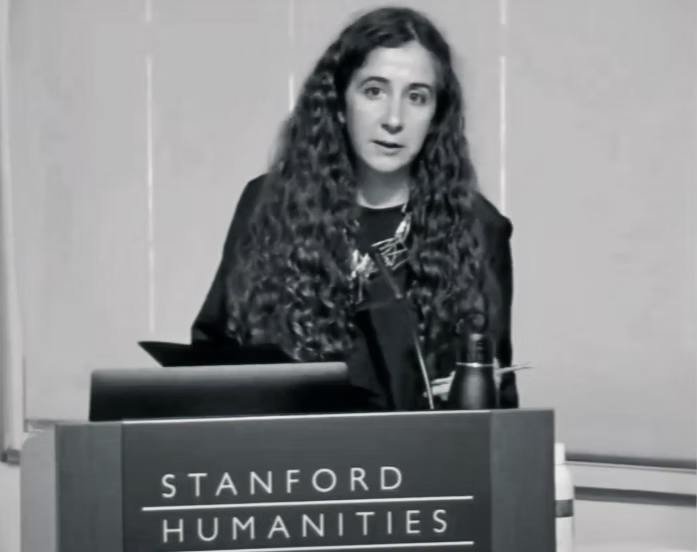
Hawkins giving the Raymond F. West Memorial Lecture at Stanford University in 2023

- European Research Council Consolidator Grant, Thinking Deep – Novel creative approaches to the underground (2020–2025)
- Raymond F. West Memorial Lecture at Stanford University, Imagine! Creating Earth Futures? (2023)
- Cultural Geographies Annual Lecture, Going Underground: Creating Subterranean Imaginations (2019)
- Chair of the Royal Geographical Society Social and Cultural Geography Research Group (2016–2019)
- AHRC Leadership Fellowship (2016–2018)
- Philip Leverhulme Prize (2016)
- Royal Geographical Society Gill Memorial Award (2016)
- Progress in Human Geography prize for the best paper of the year: Geography and Art. An Expanding Field: Site, The Body and Practice (2013)
- Fellow of the Royal Geographical Society (2007)

== Selected publications ==
Since 2009, Hawkins has achieved over 80 peer-reviewed outputs, including:

=== Books ===
- Geography, Art, Research: Artistic Research in the GeoHumanities (Routledge 2020), ISBN 0367558351
- Geographies of Making, Craft and Creativity (Editor with Laura Price) (Routledge 2018), ISBN 1315296918
- Creativity (Routledge 2016), ISBN 1317604938
- Geographical Aesthetics: Imagining Space, Staging Encounters (Editor with Elizabeth Straughan) (Ashgate 2015), ISBN 1409448010
- For Creative Geographies: Geography, Visual Arts and the Making of Worlds (Routledge 2013), ISBN 1135139679

=== Journal articles ===
- Underground imaginations, environmental crisis and subterranean cultural geographies. Cultural Geographies (2020)
- (W)holes – Volume, Horizon, Surface – Three intimate geologies. Emotion, Space and Society (2019)
- Geography's creative (re)turn: Toward a critical framework. Progress in Human Geography (2018)
- To talk of turns. Three cross-disciplinary provocations for creative turns. Journal of Contemporary Archaeology (2018)
- Creative geographic methods: knowing, representing, intervening. On composing place and page. Cultural Geographies (2015)
- Geography and art. An expanding field: Site, the body and practice. Progress in Human Geography (2013)
- Dialogues and doings: Sketching the relationships between geography and art. Geography Compass (2011)
- 'The argument of the eye'? The cultural geographies of installation art. Cultural Geographies (2010)
