= Zedner =

Zedner is a Jewish-German surname. The name originates from the town of Zehden, in Brandenburg province in Germany. Notable people with the surname include:

- Joseph Zedner (1804–1871), German bibliographer and librarian
- Lucia Zedner (born 1961), British legal scholar

== See also ==
- Zedner v. United States, 547 U.S. 489 (2006), a United States Supreme Court case
