= Sarah Curtis =

Sarah Curtis may refer to:

- Sarah Curtis (Dynasty character)
- Sarah Curtis (geographer), British geographer of health and wellbeing
- Sarah Hoadly (1676–1743), née Curtis, British portrait painter
- Sara Curtis (born 2006), Italian swimmer
