= Moral geography =

Moral geographies (a term coined by Felix Driver) are, according to David Smith (2000), the studying of human geography with a normative emphasis. The kind of questions that are examined including asking whether distance from a phenomenon lessens one's duty, whether there is a substantial difference between private spaces and public spaces and analysing which moral positions are personal, which are societal, which are absolute and which are relative. One key question is how to respect difference whilst recognizing universal rights.
