= The Oxford History of Early Modern Europe =

The Oxford History of Early Modern Europe comprises a series of self-contained monographs, usually addressing an individual country or theme.

== Books ==
- The Dutch Republic: Its Rise, Greatness, and Fall 1477–1806 (1995) by Jonathan Israel
- Contested Island: Ireland 1460–1630 (2007) by S.J. Connolly
- Divided Kingdom: Ireland 1630–1800 (2008) by S.J. Connolly
- Germany and the Holy Roman Empire, Volume I: Maximilian I to the Peace of Westphalia, 1493–1648 (2012) by Joachim Whaley
- Germany and the Holy Roman Empire, Volume II: The Peace of Westphalia to the Dissolution of the Reich, 1648–1806 (2012) by Joachim Whaley
- The Oxford History of Poland-Lithuania, Volume I: The Making of the Polish-Lithuanian Union, 1385–1569 (2015) by Robert I. Frost
- The Russian Empire 1450–1801 (2017) by Nancy Shields Kollmann
