= Denis Cosgrove =

British cultural geographer and professor

- Born: Denis Edmund Cosgrove; 3 May 1948; Liverpool, England
- Died: 21 March 2008 (aged 59); West Hollywood, California, U.S.
- Spouses: Isobel Thubron (m. 1970, divorced); Carmen Mills (m. 1989)
- Children: 3
- Awards: Royal Geographical Society Back Award (1998); Honorary Doctorate, Tallinn University (2008)

Academic background
- Education: University of Oxford (MA, DPhil); University of Toronto (MA)
- Thesis: Palladian Landscape: Geographical change and its cultural representations in 16th century Italy (1976)

Academic work
- Discipline: Geography
- Sub-discipline: Cultural Geography
- Institutions: University of California, Los Angeles; Royal Holloway, University of London; Loughborough University; Oxford Polytechnic
- Doctoral students: Professor Veronica Della Dora FBA
- Notable works: Social formation and symbolic landscape (1998); The iconography of landscape: Essays on the symbolic representation, design and use of past environments (1988) (edited with Stephen Daniels); Apollo's Eye: A cartographic genealogy of the Earth in the Western Imagination (2001)

Denis Edmund Cosgrove (3 May 1948 – 21 March 2008) was a British cultural geographer. He taught at Oxford Polytechnic, Loughborough University, Royal Holloway, University of London, where he rose to become dean of the graduate school, and finally at the University of California, Los Angeles. In 1998, he received the prestigious Back Award from the Royal Geographical Society.

== Biography ==
Cosgrove was born and raised in Liverpool, the second eldest of six children. His father, a bank manager and devout Roman Catholic, was very active in his upbringing, sending him to the Jesuit school he had himself attended, St Francis Xavier's College, Liverpool. Geography was a subject Cosgrove loved, but the school had a low opinion of it, and as an A-stream student he was forced to drop it in favour of Latin and Greek (protesting to the headmaster, a priest, his mother was told emphatically "geography is a girl's subject").

He won an open scholarship to read geography at St Catherine's College, Oxford. He graduated in 1969, going on to complete an MA in geography at the University of Toronto. After marrying his first wife in New York, he returned to the University of Oxford to do a doctorate with a "head full of new ideas", but with little academic support, and left to take a job "up the hill" as Lecturer at Oxford Polytechnic in 1972. Meanwhile, his thesis on Venetian landscape was submitted for a Bachelor of Letters (BLitt) degree, only to be successfully resubmitted for a Doctor of Philosophy (DPhil) degree in 1976 on the insistence of its examiner, David Lowenthal, who considered it an outstanding piece of work.

In 1970, Cosgrove married Isobel Thubron; they had two daughters and later divorced.

Cosgrove remained at Oxford Polytechnic until 1980, rising to be principal lecturer. He then moved to Loughborough University becoming reader in 1988, before transferring to Royal Holloway, University of London in 1994 as professor, ultimately serving as dean of the graduate school. In 1989, he married Carmen Mills, and they had a son. Cosgrove was appointed Alexander von Humboldt Professor of Geography at the University of California, Los Angeles (UCLA) in 2000, remaining a visiting professor at Royal Holloway, University of London until his death.

Cosgrove was about to become chairman of the geography department at UCLA, when he was diagnosed with stomach cancer in 2006. He had been named Getty Distinguished Scholar for 2008-9, and had planned to work on geography and art in Los Angeles. Cosgrove died of cancer at his home West Hollywood, California, on 21 March 2008, at the age of 59.

== Research ==
Cosgrove's research interests evolved from a focus on the meanings of landscape in human and cultural geography, especially in Western Europe since the 15th century, to a broader concern with the role of spatial images and representations in the making and communicating of knowledge. His work included how visual images have been used in history to shape geographical imaginations and in connection between geography as a formal discipline, imaginative expressions of geographical knowledge and experience in the visual arts (including cartography). This research made essential contributions to the development of geography of media and communication.

This broad concern was pursued through a series of focussed studies: of landscape transformation, design and images in 16th-century Venice and north Italy, of landscape writings by authors such as John Ruskin, of landscape, space and performance in 20th century Rome, of cosmography in early modern Europe (1450–1650), and of the history of Western imaginings of the globe and whole earth. He has also written extensively on theory in cultural geography and edited for six years the journal Ecumene (now titled Cultural Geographies) which publishes cross-disciplinary work on environment, culture and meaning.

Within his cultural research, Cosgrove differentiated between dominant cultures and alternative cultures. The dominant culture has the most influence in shaping a landscape. Most of what you see, he claimed, is likely to be a product of the dominant culture in a region. However, one is also likely to see evidence of alternative, or subcultures in the landscape. Within the category of alternative culture, Cosgrove differentiated between residual cultures (historic cultures that have disappeared or are in the process of fading away), emergent cultures (those that are just now appearing), and excluded cultures (those that are actively or passively excluded by the dominant culture).

== Honours and awards ==
In February 2008, Cosgrove was awarded an honorary doctorate from Tallinn University., having previously been awarded the prestigious Back Award from the Royal Geographical Society in 1988. He delivered the influential Hettner Lectures in 2005. Following his death, he was widely recognised for his contribution to the field, including an extensive reflection on his career and research in the journal Cultural Geographies. The Centre for GeoHumanities at Royal Holloway, University of London holds an annual lecture in his honour.

== Bibliography ==
- Towards a radical cultural geography: problems of theory, Antipode 15, (1983), 1–11
- The Iconography of Landscape: Essays on the Symbolic Representation, Design and Use of Past Environments, (edited with Stephen Daniels), Cambridge: Cambridge University Press, 1988
- Water Engineering and Landscape: Water Control and Landscape Transformation in the Modern Period, 192 pp. London: Belhaven, 1990 (with Geoffrey Petts)
- Cultural Landscapes, in Tim Unwin (ed) Europe: a modern geography, Longman, London, 1997, 65–81
- Social formation and Symbolic Landscape (2nd edition with additional introductory chapter), Wisconsin Univ. Press, 1998
- Urban rhetoric and embodied identities: city, nation and empire at the Vittorio Emanuele II monument in Rome 1870–1944 (with D Atkinson), Annals, Association of American Geographers, 88, 1, 1998, 28–49.
- Airport/Landscape, in J Corner (ed) Recovering Landscape Princeton Architectural Press, Princeton NJ, 1999, 221–232 (with paintings by Adrian Hemming)
- Empire in modern Rome: shaping and remembering an imperial city (with D Atkinson and A Notaro), in F Driver & D Gilbert (eds) Imperial Cities: landscape, display, identity. Manchester University Press, Manchester, 1999, 40–63
- La géographie culturelle et la signification du millénaire, Géographie et Cultures, 31, 1999, 49–64
- Liminal geometry and elemental landscape: construction and representation, in J Corner (ed) Recovering Landscape Princeton Architectural Press, Princeton NJ, 1999, 103–120
- Mappings (editor) 311 pp. Reaktion Books, London, 1999
- Global illumination and enlightenment in the geographies of Vincenzo Coronelli and Athanasius Kircher, in C Withers & D Livingstone (eds)Enlightenment Geographies, Chicago University Press, Chicago, 2000, 33–66.
- Millennial geographics, (with L Martins) Annals, Association of American Geographers 90. 1, 2000
- Apollo's Eye: a cartographic genealogy of the Earth in the Western Imagination, Johns Hopkins University Press, Baltimore, MD, 2001
- Ptolemy and Vitruvius: Spatial representation in the 16th-century texts and commentaries in Architecture and Sciences, Princeton Architectural Press, New York, NY, 2003
- "Landscape and Landschaft". Bulletin of the German Historical Institute. 35: 57–71. Fall 2004.
- Carto-City, in Else/Where: Mapping – New Cartographies of Networks and Territories, Janet Abrams and Peter Hall (eds), 148–157. Minneapolis: University of Minnesota Design Institute, 2006
- Images of Renaissance Cosmography, 1450–1650, in Cartography in the European Renaissance, David Woodward (ed), 55–98. Vol. 3 of The History of Cartography. Chicago: University of Chicago Press, 2007
- Mapping the World, in Maps: Finding Our Place in the World, James R. Akerman and Robert W Karrow, Jr (eds), 65–115. Chicago: University of Chicago Press, 2007
- High places: cultural geographies of mountains and ice, (with Veronica Della Dora), IB Tauris, 2008
