= Health geography =

Application of geographical methods to the study of health and disease

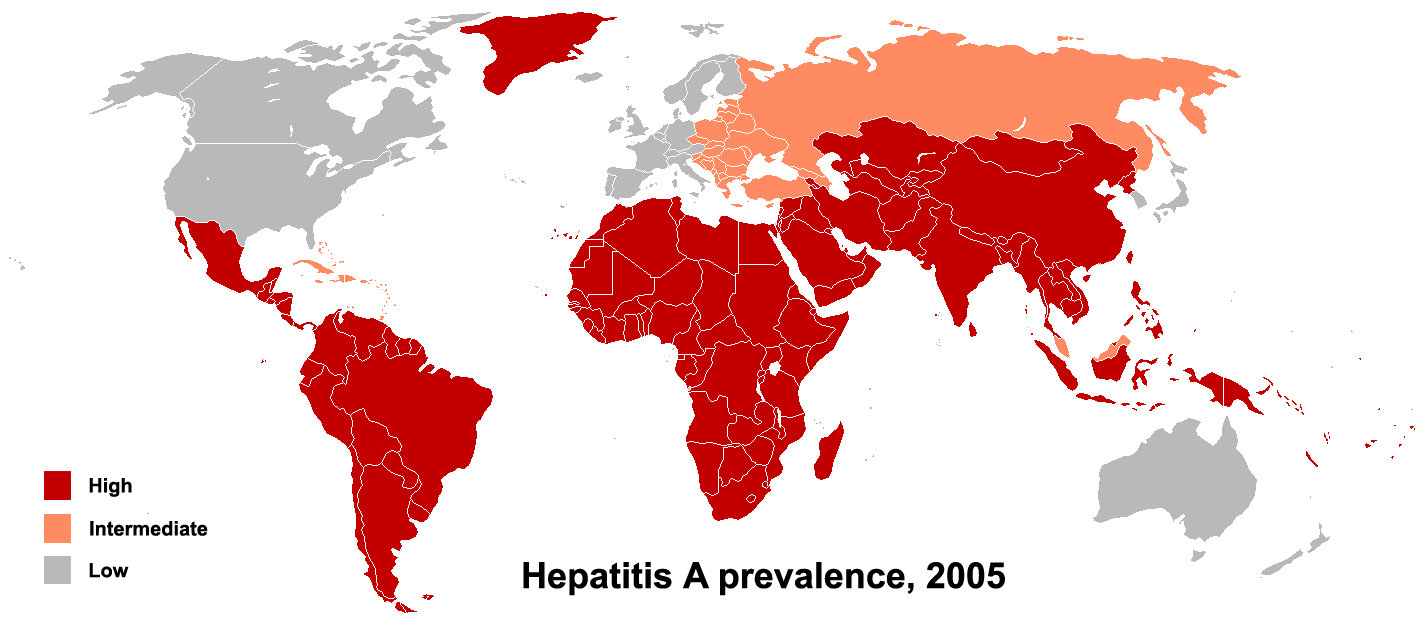
Hepatitis A prevalence worldwide, 2005.

Health geography is the application of geographical information, perspectives, and methods to the study of health, disease, and health care. Medical geography, a sub-discipline of, or sister field of health geography, focuses on understanding spatial patterns of health and disease in relation to the natural and social environment. Conventionally, there are two primary areas of research within medical geography: the first deals with the spatial distribution and determinants of morbidity and mortality, while the second deals with health planning, help-seeking behavior, and the provision of health services.

== Overview ==
=== Medical geography ===
The first area of study within medical geography has been described as geographical epidemiology or disease geography and is focused on the spatial patterns and processes of health and disease outcomes. This area of inquiry can be differentiated from the closely related discipline of epidemiology in that it uses concepts and methods from geography, allowing an ecologic perspective on health that considers how interactions between humans and the environment result in observed health outcomes. The second area of study focused on the planning and provision of health services, often with a focus on the spatial organization of health systems and exploration of how this arrangement affects accessibility of care.

=== Health geography ===
The study of health geography has been influenced by repositioning medical geography within the field of social geography due to a shift towards a social model in health care, rather than a medical model. This advocates for the redefinition of health and health care away from prevention and treatment of illness only to one of promoting well-being in general. Under this model, some previous illnesses (e.g., mental ill health) are recognized as behavior disturbances only, and other types of medicine (e.g., complementary or alternative medicine and traditional medicine) are studied by the medicine researchers, sometimes with the aid of health geographers without medical education. This shift changes the definition of care, no longer limiting it to spaces such as hospitals or doctor's offices. Also, the social model gives priority to the intimate encounters performed at non-traditional spaces of medicine and healthcare as well as to the individuals as health consumers.

This alternative methodological approach means that medical geography is broadened to incorporate philosophies such as Marxian political economy, structuralism, social interactionism, humanism, feminism and queer theory.

== History ==
John Snow's cholera map of the 1854 Broad Street cholera outbreak.

Relationships between place and health have long been recognized throughout human history, predating modern health delivery systems and providing insights into the transmission of infectious agents, well before the germ theory paradigm shift in the late 1800s. Throughout history, there have been many examples of place and location playing major roles in shaping perceptions of health and risk. The associations between geographical characteristics and health outcomes, which essentially form the foundation of modern medical geography, were recognized more than 2,000 years ago by Hippocrates in his treatise ’’On Airs, Waters, and Places’’ (c. 400 BC). The Industrial Revolution in the 1700s brought with it a plethora of novel public health issues stemming from rapid urban development and poor sanitation, conditions which fueled the development of disease mapping, or medical cartography. A precursor to medical geography, medical cartography arose from the need to communicate spatial discrepancies in risk for diseases of unknown cause, particularly urban outbreaks of cholera and yellow fever. One of the most prominent figures in both epidemiology and medical geography is John Snow, the physician who correctly identified the source of exposure during the 1854 Broad Street cholera outbreak. Snow's famous 1854 map of the cholera outbreak graphically demonstrates that cases were clustered around the Broad Street pump, the source of contaminated water that fueled the epidemic. This map led Snow to identify the contaminated pump and conclude that cholera was a waterborne illness, a remarkable feat given that bacteria were unknown to science at the time. While Snow's contributions to medical geography and epidemiology are irrefutable, the role of the map in this particular investigation is somewhat overstated. Dot maps of cases produced during the industrial period were powerful tools in communicating the findings of traditional epidemiological measures of association, but their role as analytic tools were restricted due to technological limitations.

Modern medical geography arose in the United States in the 1950s with the pioneering work of Jacques May, who worked as a surgeon in Thailand and Vietnam and noticed differences between the health experiences of his patients in these locations and in Europe. Although the notion that the environment could influence human health has been understood since Hippocrates, medical geography as envisioned by May built on this idea, describing medical geography as working to understand the nature of the relationships between pathogen transmission and geographical factors. May soon began mapping global distributions of disease and exploring the cultural and environmental factors that influenced these distributions.

== Areas of study ==
Health geography is considered to be divided into two distinct elements. The first of which is focused on geographies of disease and ill health, involving descriptive research quantifying disease frequencies and distributions, and analytic research concerned with finding what characteristics make an individual or population susceptible to disease. This requires an understanding of epidemiology. The second component of health geography is the geography of health care, primarily facility location, accessibility, and utilization. This requires the use of spatial analysis and often borrows from behavioral economics.

=== Geographies of disease and ill health ===
Health geographers are concerned with the prevalence of different diseases along a range of spatial scales from a local to global view, and inspects the natural world, in all of its complexity, for correlations between diseases and locations. This situates health geography alongside other geographical sub-disciplines that trace human-environment relations. Health geographers use modern spatial analysis tools to map the dispersion of health, including various diseases, as individuals spread them amongst themselves, and across wider spaces as they migrate. Health geographers also consider all types of spaces as presenting health risks, from natural disasters, to interpersonal violence, stress, and other potential dangers.

Health insurance coverage

=== Geography of health care provision ===
Although healthcare is a public good, it is not equally available to all individuals. Demand for public services is continuously increasing. People need advance knowledge and the latest prediction technology, that health geography offers. The latest example of such technology is Telemedicine. Many people in the United States are not able to access proper healthcare because of inequality in health insurance and the means to afford medical care.

Mobility and Disease Tracking:
With the advent of mobile technology and its spread, it is now possible to track individual mobility. By correlating the movement of individuals through tracking the devices using access towers or other tracking systems, it is now possible to determine and even control disease spread. While privacy laws question the legality of tracking individuals, the commercial mobile service providers are using covert techniques or obtaining government waivers to allow permission to track people.

== Methods ==
Geographic Information Systems (GIS) are used extensively in medical geography to visualize and analyze georeferenced health-related data. These spatial data can be vector (point, line, or polygon) or raster (continuous grid) format and are often presented in quantitative thematic maps. Disease outcomes and sociodemographic characteristics collected through surveillance systems and population censuses are frequently used as data sources in medical geography studies. In disease ecology studies, interpolated climate data, gridded land surveys, and remote sensing imagery are examples of data used to quantify the environmental characteristics of disease systems. Spatial statistics or analysis are applied to test hypotheses regarding patterns or relationships within these data, such as the property of spatial dependency (spatially closer entities are more similar or related than spatially distant entities) or spatial heterogeneity (locations are unique relative to other locations). Some examples of the spatial analyses used in medical geography include point pattern analysis, tests for spatial autocorrelation, geographically weighted regression (GWR), ecological niche modeling, spatial scan statistics, and network analysis.

== Health geographers ==
Notable health geographers include:

- Sarah Curtis
- William C. Gorgas
- Kelvyn Jones
- John Snow
- Mei-Po Kwan
- Nadine Schuurman
- Kirsty Duncan

== See also ==
- Cluster (epidemiology)
- Social model of disability
- Spatial epidemiology
- Tobler's first law of geography
- Tobler's second law of geography
