= Veronica della Dora =

Italian cultural geographer and professor

Veronica della Dora FBA
- Born: 1976 (age 49–50); Venice, Italy

Academic background
- Education: University of California, Los Angeles
- Thesis: Geographies of the Holy Mountain (2005)
- Doctoral advisor: Denis Cosgrove

Academic work
- Discipline: Geography
- Sub-discipline: Cultural geography; geohumanities
- Institutions: Royal Holloway, London; University of Bristol; Getty Research Institute
- Main interests: Geo-humanities; landscape studies; history of cartography; sacred geographies; Byzantine and post-Byzantine studies
- Notable works: High Places (2008); Landscape, Nature and the Sacred in Byzantium (2017)

Veronica della Dora FBA (born 1976) is an Italian cultural geographer. She is Professor of Human Geography at Royal Holloway, University of London, where she is Director of the Social, Cultural & Historical Geography Group and Co-Director of the Centre for GeoHumanities (with Harriet Hawkins).

Della Dora comes from Venice and grew up living on the Lido. She gained a PhD from University of California, Los Angeles (UCLA) in 2005, under the supervision of Denis Cosgrove. After leaving UCLA, she joined the Getty Research Institute, Los Angeles as a post-doctoral fellow, before moving to the University of Bristol in 2007 as a lecturer. She joined Royal Holloway, University of London as Professor in September 2013.

Her first monograph Imagining Mount Athos: Visions of a Holy Mountain from Homer to World War II was shortlisted for the Criticos Prize in 2012. Landscape, Nature and the Sacred in Byzantium was nominated for the 2017 Runciman Award. In 2018, della Dora was elected a Fellow of the British Academy.

== Selected publications ==
- High Places: Cultural Geographies of Mountains and Ice (2008, Cosgrove, D and della Dora, V.; I.B. Tauris: ISBN 9781845116170)
- Visual and Historical Geographies: Essays in Honour of Denis E. Cosgrove (2010, edited by della Dora, V; Digby, S; Basdas, B.; Royal Geographical Society - Institute of British Geographers, 2010: ISBN 9781870074247)
- Imagining Mount Athos: Visions of a Holy Place from Homer to World War II (2011, University of Virginia Press: ISBN 978-0-8139-3259-0)
- Christian Pilgrimage, Landscape, and Heritage: Journeying to the Sacred (2014, Maddrell, Avril; della Dora, Veronica; Scafi, Alessandro; Walton, Heather; Routledge: ISBN 978-0-415-84398-0)
- Mountain: Nature and Culture (2016, Reaktion Books: ISBN 9781780236476)
- Landscape, Nature, and the Sacred in Byzantium (2016, Cambridge University Press: ISBN 9781107139091)
- The Mantle of the Earth: Genealogies of a Geographical Metaphor (2021, University of Chicago Press: ISBN 9780226741321)
