= David Smith (geographer) =

British human geographer (1936–2021)

David M. Smith (1936–2021) was a British human geographer. He made attempts to bring moral philosophy into human geography, thus enabling the development of moral geographies as a field of study. He worked until his retirement as a professor of geography at Queen Mary University of London and had previously worked at the University of Manchester, University of Southern Illinois, University of Florida and had short-term lectureships at the University of Natal, the University of the Witwatersrand and the University of New England. Major influences on his approach were August Lösch's Economics of Location and Harold Lasswell's argument that politics is about who gets what, when and how to which he added the human geographers where.

Smith was elected a Fellow of the British Academy in 2009.

== Selected publications ==
- Smith, D. M. (2000). Moral geographies: Ethics in a world of difference. Edinburgh University Press.
- Smith, D. M. (1994). Geography and social justice. John Wiley & Sons
- Smith, D. M. (1977) Human Geography: A Welfare Approach, Edward Arnold
