= Jonathan Israel =

British historian (born 1946)

Jonathan Israel FBA
- Born: Jonathan Irvine Israel; 22 January 1946 (age 80); London, England
- Occupations: Academic, historian
- Awards: Wolfson History Prize; Fellow of the British Academy; Leo Gershoy Award; Order of the Netherlands Lion; Dr A.H. Heineken Prize; Benjamin Franklin Medal; PROSE Award

Academic background
- Education: Queens' College, Cambridge; University of Oxford

Academic work
- Institutions: Newcastle University (1970–1972); University of Hull (1972–1974); University College London (1974–2001); Institute for Advanced Study, Princeton (2001–present); University of Amsterdam (2007)
- Main interests: Dutch history Age of Enlightenment; European Jews; Spinoza

Jonathan Irvine Israel FBA (born 22 January 1946) is a British historian specialising in Dutch history, the Age of Enlightenment, Spinoza's philosophy and European Jews. Israel was appointed as Andrew W. Mellon Professor in the School of Historical Studies at the Institute for Advanced Study, Princeton, New Jersey, in January 2001 and retired in July 2016. He was previously Professor of Dutch History and Institutions at the University College London.

In recent years, Israel has focused his attention on a multi-volume history of the Age of Enlightenment. He contrasts two camps. The "radical Enlightenment" was founded on a rationalist materialism first articulated by Spinoza. Standing in opposition was a "moderate Enlightenment" which he sees as weakened by its belief in God.

== Life ==
Israel's career until 2001 unfolded in British academia. He attended Kilburn Grammar School, and like his school peer and future fellow historian Robert Wistrich went on to study History as an undergraduate at Queens' College, Cambridge, graduating with a first-class degree in Part II of the Tripos in 1967. His graduate work took place at the University of Oxford and the El Colegio de México, Mexico City, leading to his D.Phil. from Oxford in 1972. He was named Sir James Knott Research Fellow at the University of Newcastle upon Tyne in 1970, and in 1972 he moved to the University of Hull where he was first an assistant lecturer then a lecturer in Early Modern Europe. In 1974 he became a lecturer in Early Modern European History at University College London, progressing to become a reader in Modern History in 1981, and then to Professor of Dutch History and Institutions in 1984.

In January 2001, Israel became a professor of modern European history in the School of Historical Studies at the Institute for Advanced Study, Princeton, New Jersey. In 2007, the 375th anniversary of the birth of Spinoza, he held the Spinoza Chair of Philosophy at the University of Amsterdam.

== Views ==
Israel has defined what he considers to be the "Radical Enlightenment," arguing it originated with Spinoza. He argues in great detail that Spinoza "and Spinozism were in fact the intellectual backbone of the European Radical Enlightenment everywhere, not only in the Netherlands, Germany, France, Italy, and Scandinavia but also Britain and Ireland", and that the Radical Enlightenment, leaning towards religious skepticism and republican government, leads on to the modern liberal-democratic state.

Israel is sharply critical of Jean-Paul Marat and Maximilien de Robespierre for repudiating what he sees as the true values of the Radical Enlightenment and grossly distorting the French Revolution. He argues that, "Jacobin ideology and culture under Robespierre was an obsessive Rousseauiste moral Puritanism steeped in authoritarianism, anti-intellectualism, and xenophobia, "and it repudiated free expression, basic human rights, and democracy."

In response to Israel's series on the Enlightenment, writes Johnson Kent Wright, there appeared —

a series of in-depth critiques, from leading practitioners of every stripe, including Theo Verbeek, Harvey Chisick, Anthony La Vopa, Antoine Lilti, Samuel Moyn, and Dan Edelstein. Though all expressed admiration for the breadth of Israel's reading and display of sheer scholarly stamina, they also reached a strikingly unanimous verdict. In the eyes of his critics, Israel's interpretation of the Enlightenment is a kind of academic juggernaut, careening destructively through the discipline, in the service of a false idol—Spinoza, supposed demiurge of modernity—and an unsustainable principle—the idea of an umbilical connection between metaphysical monism and political radicalism.

A Marxist defense of Israel against one critic (Samuel Moyn) appeared in 2010 on the World Socialist Web Site, particularly in the article, "The Nation, Jonathan Israel and the Enlightenment". The two defenders also criticize Israel, saying:

There are problems in his argument. The dichotomy between a radical and moderate Enlightenment, however suggestive and stimulating, tends at times to overly simplify complex and contradictory processes in the development of philosophical thought. It is not always the case, as Professor Israel seems to suggest, that the most significant advances in philosophical thought were made by individuals who held the most politically radical views.

In 2004, in response to a Historisch Nieuwsblad survey, which asked members of the Royal Netherlands Historical Society what were the classic works about Dutch history, The Dutch Republic: Its Rise, Greatness and Fall, 1477–1806 came in second place.

== Honors and awards ==
He was made a Fellow of the British Academy in 1992, Corresponding Fellow of the Koninklijke Nederlandse Akademie van Wetenschappen (Royal Netherlands Academy of Arts and Sciences) in 1994, won the American Historical Association's Leo Gershoy Award in 2001, and was made Knight of the Order of the Netherlands Lion in 2004. In 2008, he won the Dr A.H. Heineken Prize for history, medicine, environmental studies and cognitive science.

In 2010 he was awarded the Benjamin Franklin Medal by the Royal Society for the Encouragement of Arts, Manufactures and Commerce (RSA) for his outstanding contribution to Enlightenment scholarship.

In 2015 he was awarded the PROSE Awards in European & World History by the Association of American Publishers (AAP) for professional and scholarly excellence.

In 2017 Israel received the Comenius Prize by the Comenius Museum for his work on the Age of Enlightenment, Dutch history, and European Jewry and his ability to connect economic and intellectual history with the history of politics, religion, society, and science.

== Bibliography ==
- Race, Class and Politics in Colonial Mexico, 1610–70. Oxford Historical Monographs. 1975. ISBN 0-19-821860-5 HB.
- The Dutch Republic and the Hispanic World, 1606–61. 1982. ISBN 0-19-826534-4 HB; ISBN 0-19-821998-9 PB.
- European Jewry in the Age of Mercantilism, 1550–1750. 1985. ISBN 0-19-821928-8 HB; ISBN 1-874774-42-0 PB.
- Dutch Primacy in World Trade, 1585–1740. 1989. ISBN 0-19-821139-2 PB.
- Empires and Entrepots: The Dutch, the Spanish Monarchy and the Jews, 1585–1713. 1990. ISBN 1-85285-022-1 HB.
- The Anglo-Dutch Moment: Essays on the Glorious Revolution and Its World Impact. 1991. (editor). ISBN 0-521-39075-3 HB; ISBN 0-521-54406-8 PB.
- From Persecution to Toleration: Glorious Revolution and Religion in England. 1991. (co-editor) ISBN 0-19-820196-6 HB.
- The Dutch Republic: Its Rise, Greatness and Fall, 1477–1806. Oxford History of Early Modern Europe. 1995. ISBN 0-19-873072-1 HB; ISBN 0-198-20734-4 PB.
- Conflicts of Empires: Spain, the Low Countries and the Struggle for World Supremacy, 1585–1713. 1997. ISBN 1-85285-161-9 HB.
- Radical Enlightenment: Philosophy and the Making of Modernity, 1650–1750. 2001. ISBN 0-19-820608-9 HB; ISBN 0-199-25456-7 PB.
- Diasporas Within a Diaspora: Jews, Crypto-Jews and the World of Maritime Empires (1540–1740). Brill's Series in Jewish Studies. 2002. ISBN 90-04-12765-8 HB.
- Dutch Jewry: Its History and Secular Culture (1500–2000). Brill's Series in Jewish Studies. 2002. (co-editor) ISBN 90-04-12436-5 HB.
- Enlightenment Contested: Philosophy, Modernity, and the Emancipation of Man, 1670–1752. 2006. ISBN 0-19-927922-5 HB.
- Benedict de Spinoza, Theological-Political Treatise. 2007. (co-editor) ISBN 978-0-521-53097-2 HB.
- A Revolution of the Mind: Radical Enlightenment and the Intellectual Origins of Modern Democracy. 2009. ISBN 978-0-691-14200-5 HB.
- Democratic Enlightenment: Philosophy, Revolution, and Human Rights 1750–1790. 2011. ISBN 978-0-199-54820-0 HB.
- Revolutionary Ideas: An Intellectual History of the French Revolution from The Rights of Man to Robespierre. 2014. ISBN 978-0-691-15172-4 HB.
- The Expanding Blaze: How the American Revolution Ignited the World, 1775-1848. 2017. ISBN 978-0-691-17660-4 HB.
- The Enlightenment That Failed: Ideas, Revolution, and Democratic Defeat, 1748-1830. 2019. ISBN 978-0-198-73840-4 HB.
- Revolutionary Jews from Spinoza to Marx. The Fight for a Secular World of Universal and Equal Rights. 2021. ISBN 978-0-295-74866-5 HB.
- Historical Dictionary of the Enlightenment. 2023. ISBN 978-1-538-12313-3 HB.
- Spinoza: Life and Legacy. 2023. ISBN 978-0-198-85748-8 HB.

(Radical Enlightenment (2001), Enlightenment Contested (2006), and Democratic Enlightenment (2011) constitute a trilogy on the history of the Radical Enlightenment and the intellectual origins of modern democracy. A Revolution of the Mind (2009) is a shorter work on the same theme.)

== See also ==
- Counter-Enlightenment
