= Regius Professor of Music =

Named chair at the University of London

The Regius Professorship of Music was established at Royal Holloway, University of London, in 2013 to mark the Diamond Jubilee of Elizabeth II and recognise "exceptional standards of teaching and research" in the music department.

The first Regius Professor was Julian Johnson, FBA, who had been Professor of Music at Royal Holloway since 2007.
