= Catherine Nash =

Irish geographer

Catherine Nash FBA is Professor of Human Geography at the University of London.

Nash studies Feminist cultural geography, geographies of relatedness, Irish studies. Recently, her work has regarded the meaning of ancestry and origins in the making of ethnic, national and diasporic identities through research on traditional and new forms of genealogical practices.

She teaches at the Department of Geography at the University of London.

In July 2018 Nash was elected a Fellow of the British Academy (FBA).

== Bibliography ==
- Nash, C. (2008), Of Irish Descent: Origin Stories, Genealogy, and The Politics of Belonging, Syracuse University Press.
- Nash, C. (2007), Eef Birthing
- Nash, C. (2007) Mapping origins: race and relatedness in population genetics and genetic genealogy in Paul Atkinson and Peter Glasner eds. New Genetics, New Identities, Routledge, 77–100.
- Nash C. (2006) Irish Origins, Celtic Origins: Population Genetics, Cultural Politics, Irish Studies Review, 14 (1): 11-37
- Graham, B. and Nash C. (2006) A Shared Future: Territoriality, Pluralism and Public Policy in Northern Ireland, Political Geography 25(3): 253-278
- Nash, C. (2005) Geographies of Relatedness, Transactions of the Institute of British Geographers 30 449–462
- Nash, C. (2005) Local Histories in Northern Ireland, History Workshop Journal 60 45–68
- Nash, C. (2005) Equity, diversity and interdependence: cultural policy in Northern Ireland, Antipode 37(2): 272–300
- Nash, C. (2005) Mapping Emotion: longing and location in the work of Kathy Prendergast, in Fintan Cullen ed. A Shared Legacy: essays on Irish and Scottish Art and Visual Culture, Ashgate, 272–245
- Nash, C. (2004) Genetic kinship, Cultural Studies, 18(1): 1–34
- Jacobs, J. M. and Nash, C. (2003) Too Little, Too Much: cultural feminist geographies Gender, Place and Culture: A Journal of Feminist Geography, 10(3): 265–279
- Nash, C. (2003) "They’re family!": cultural geographies of relatedness in popular genealogy in Sara Armed, Anne-Marie Fortier and Mimi Sheller eds. Uprootings/Regroundings: Questions of Home and Migration, Berg, Oxford and New York, 179–203
- Nash, C. (2003) Setting roots in motion: genealogy, geography and identity in David Trigger and Gareth Griffiths eds. Disputed Territories: Land, Culture and Identity in Settler Societies, Hong Kong University Press, Hong Kong, 29–52
- Nash, C. (2002) Genealogical identities, Environment and Planning D: Society and Space 20(1): 27–52
