= Patricia Waugh =

Professor Patricia Waugh FBA
- Born: 25 April 1956 (age 70)
- Education: University of Birmingham
- Occupation: Professor of English
- Organization: Durham University
- Known for: work on literary theory, metafiction, intellectual history, literature and neuroscience and postmodernism
- Notable work: Metafiction: the Theory and Practice of Self-Conscious Fiction

Professor Patricia Waugh FBA (born 25 April 1956) is a literary critic, intellectual historian and Professor of English Literature at Durham University. She is a leading specialist in modernist and post-modernist literature, feminist theory, intellectual history, and postwar fiction and its political contexts. Along with Linda Hutcheon, Waugh is notable as one of the first critics to work on metafiction and, in particular, for her influential 1984 study, Metafiction: the Theory and Practice of Self-Conscious Fiction.

Waugh completed her PhD at the University of Birmingham under the supervision of David Lodge. She joined the Department of English Studies at Durham University in 1989, became a Professor in 1997, and was Head of the Department of English Studies between 2005 and 2008.

In 2014, Waugh gave the first lecture, entitled "Fiction as Therapy: Towards a Neo-Phenomenological Theory of the Novel", in the British Academy's Lecture on the Novel in English series.

Waugh was invited, in 2015, to contribute to the Chief Scientific Adviser's Report to the Government on Science arguing the case for the importance to scientific development of the humanities.

In 2016, she was elected a Fellow of the British Academy.

Waugh has won over £5 million in research funding and has been the external examiner of over 90 PhD theses.

== Current work ==
Waugh is completing a monograph entitled, The Fragility of Mind in Modernism and After: Voices in the Risk Society, examining the relationship between literary cultures and texts and theories and philosophies of mind since 1900.

With Marc Botha, she is completing a book project entitled Critical Transitions: Genealogies of Intellectual Change arising out of her work as PI on a collaborative Leverhulme funded project at Durham University on Tipping Points which examines issues around modelling complex dynamic systems from a humanities and science perspective with respect to climate change, social behaviours, and economic tips. The project is an investigation of radical change: how the new comes into the world.

Waugh is also known for her work on literature and science. Her current work includes a collaborative Wellcome Trust-funded project, on which she is PI, with neuroscientists entitled Hearing the Voice. As part of this, she is developing a new monograph on voices in literature, focusing on Virginia Woolf and examining Woolf's experiments with voice in relation to narratological and aesthetic, psychological and philosophical theories of voice and hearing voices and her own experiences as a voice hearer with the medicine of her day.

== Bibliography ==
=== Monographs ===
- Blackwell History of British Fiction: 1945-present (Oxford: Blackwell, 2009)
- Metafiction: the Theory and Practice of Self-Conscious Fiction (London: Routledge, 1984)
- Revolutions of the Word: Intellectual Contexts for the Study of Modern Literature (London: Edward Arnold, 1997)
- The Harvest of the Sixties: English Literature and its Backgrounds, 1960-1990 (Oxford: Oxford UP, 1995)
- Feminine Fictions: Revisiting the Postmodern (Oxford: Routledge, 1989)

=== Edited works ===
- Literary Theory and Criticism: an Oxford Guide (Oxford: Oxford University Press, 2006)
- With Philip Rice, Modern Literary Theory: A Reader (New York: Hodder Arnold, 2001)
- With David Fuller, The Arts and Science of Criticism (Oxford: Oxford University Press, 1999)
