= Felix Driver =

British historical geographer and professor

Professor Felix Driver FBA FAcSS
- Born: 23 August 1961 (age 65)
- Occupations: Academic; Historical Geographer
- Awards: Fellow of the British Academy (2011); Fellow of the Academy of Social Sciences (2007); Royal Geographical Society Murchison Award (2000)

Academic background
- Education: University of Cambridge; (MA, PhD)
- Thesis: The English bastile: dimensions of the workhouse system, 1834-1884 (1987)
- Doctoral advisor: Professor Derek Gregory
- Influences: Professor Denis Cosgrove; Professor Stephen Daniels

Academic work
- Discipline: Geography
- Sub-discipline: Historical Geography
- Institutions: Royal Holloway, University of London
- Main interests: Cultural history of collections and collecting; Visual culture of exploration, geography and empire, and imperial cities
- Notable works: Geography Militant: Cultures of Exploration and Empire (2001); Power and Pauperism: The Workhouse System, 1834-1884 (1993)

Felix Driver FBA FAcSS (born 23 August 1961) is a distinguished British historical geographer and Professor of Human Geography at Royal Holloway, University of London.

Driver is a historical geographer with a particular interest in the history of cultural collections. He has also examined the culture of exploring, empire and imperial cities. He has overseen collaborative research projects, in partnership with leading cultural institutions such as the British Museum and the V&A.

In 2000, he was the winner of the prestigious Royal Geographical Society Murchison Award. He was appointed a Fellow of the Academy of Social Sciences in 2007 and a Fellow of the British Academy in 2011.
