= Diana Knight =

Diana Marilyn Knight FBA (born November 1949) is a British scholar of French literature, who specialises in 19th-century French literature, Honoré de Balzac, and Roland Barthes. is Emeritus Professor of French at the University of Nottingham.

She was elected as a Fellow of the British Academy (FBA) in 2013.

== Selected works ==
- Flaubert's Characters: The Language of Illusion (1985, 2009)
- Feminism (1986) (ed)
- Women and Representation (1995) (eds, with Judith Still)
- Barthes and Utopia: Space Travel Writing (1997)
- Roland Barthes (1997) (ed)
- Critical Essays on Roland Barthes (2000) (ed)
- Balzac and the Model of Painting: Artist Stories in 'La Comédie humaine' (2007)
