= Nicholas Tarrier =

Nicholas Tarrier, FBA, FBPsS (born 1 May 1951) is a psychologist and academic. He was Professor of Clinical Psychology at the University of Manchester from 1991 to 2011, and Professor of Clinical Psychology and eHealth Studies at King's College London from 2011 to 2014.

== Career ==
Born on 1 May 1951, Nicholas Tarrier completed his undergraduate studies in Zoology at the University of Nottingham, graduating in 1972 with a first class Honours degree. The following year, he graduated from the University of Sussex with a master's degree in experimental psychology. He then completed his doctorate at the Institute of Psychiatry; his PhD was awarded in 1977 for his thesis "Measures of arousal in Schizophrenic patients in relation to their social environment". He then spent two years as Professor of Psychology at the Federal University of Paraíba, before training as a clinical psychologist at the University of Manchester; after receiving a master's degree in the discipline in 1981, he spent eight years as a clinical psychologist in the NHS in Salford DHA. He then spent two years lecturing at the University of Sydney, before joining the University of Manchester as Professor of Clinical Psychology; in 2011, he was appointed Professor of Clinical Psychology and eHealth Studies at King's College London, before retiring in 2014 (he then became an emeritus professor at Manchester).

According to his British Academy profile, Tarrier's research focuses on "the understanding of psychological and psychosocial mechanisms underlying mental disorders, particularly schizophrenia, psychoses and post-traumatic stress and the development and evaluation of psychological treatments to improve outcomes".

== Awards and honours ==
He was awarded a Nottingham University Exhibition in 1970. In 1989, Tarrier was elected a Fellow of the British Psychological Society and in 2007 he was the recipient of the M. B. Shapiro award for career contributions to clinical psychology . In 2015, he was elected a Fellow of the British Academy, the United Kingdom's national academy for the humanities and social sciences. He was appointed as Honorary Fellow of The British Association for Behavioural and Cognitive Psychotherapy in 1988, and he was Chair of the Association in 1994-1995. In 2008 he was the recipient of a Trail Blazer award from the US Association for Behavioral and Cognitive Therapies. He was one of the first recipients of the prestigious Senior Investigator awards, 2008-2013, from the National Institute for Health Research (NHS). He was awarded a Gold sports award from Nottingham University for karate in 1971 and was a member of the Nottingham University karate team that won the British Universities Karate Federation annual National Championships in 1971. He was awarded his black belt in Shotokan Karate (KUGB/JKA) in 1975.
