= Joachim Whaley =

British historian (born 1954)

Joachim Whaley FBA (born 25 August 1954 in Dulwich, London) is a historian and linguist at Cambridge University where he is Professor of German History and Thought. He has been a Fellow of Gonville and Caius College since 1987.

Joachim Whaley was educated at St Joseph's Academy, Blackheath and Christ's College, Cambridge, where he received his BA (1975) and PhD (1983) in History. He primarily teaches and researches in German history and culture since 1500 and contemporary German politics; additionally, he is an instructor of the German language and has a special interest in translation. Whaley is the author of Religious Toleration and Social Change in Hamburg, 1529–1819 (Cambridge, 1985) and Germany and the Holy Roman Empire 1493-1806 (Oxford, 2012), a study of the Holy Roman Empire published in two volumes as part of the Oxford History of Early Modern Europe. He currently has 27 works in 102 publications in two languages (English and German); both his books on religious toleration and on the Holy Roman Empire have been translated into German, while his edited volume Mirrors of Mortality: studies in the social history of death has gone through 24 English editions between 1981 and 2012. In 2010 he was awarded a Pilkington Teaching Prize by the University of Cambridge.

Whaley has been a Fellow of the Royal Historical Society since 1984. In 2013 he was awarded a LittD by the University of Cambridge for his books and articles on early modern German history. He was elected Fellow of the British Academy in July 2015.
