= Joanne Scott =

Professor of European law

Joanne Scott FBA FRSE FAcSS (b. 1965) is a legal scholar. She is professor of European law at the European University Institute. She is also co-director of the Academy of European Law at the EUI and Honorary Professor at the Faculty of Laws, UCL. She served as head of the Law Department at the EUI from 2021 to 2023.

== Biography ==
Scott has previously taught at several universities, including the University of Kent, Queen Mary University, and the University of Cambridge. She has held visiting professorships at Columbia Law School and Harvard Law School. Scott was elected as a Fellow of the Royal Society of Edinburgh in 2012 and as a Fellow of the British Academy in 2013. She is also a Fellow of the Academy of Social Sciences.

== Academic contributions ==
Joanne Scott is a legal scholar, with over 8,900 citations to her work being recorded in Google Scholar by 2024. Main lines of her research include environmental law, governance mechanisms, and the implication of European Union law beyond the borders of the Union.

Within the field of environmental law, Scott was responsible for the first edition of The WTO Agreement on Sanitary and Phytosanitary Measures: A Commentary, which was reviewed by journals including World Trade Review and the European Journal of Risk Regulation. Her books on the environmental law of the European Union have been reviewed by the Yearbook of European Law and the Journal of Environmental Law. Additionally, Scott also published articles on the subject in the European Journal of International Law, the Columbia Journal of European Law, and International & Comparative Law Quarterly.

Scott, with David M Trubek, edited a special issue of the European Law Journal on new governance, as well as a book on the subject (edited with Gráinne de Búrca).

As a scholar of extraterritorial jurisdiction, Scott is known for introducing the concept of "territorial extensions" to describe situations in which a state (or the European Union) uses a territorial link to exercise its jurisdiction beyond its borders.

== Select publications ==
- Kilpatrick, C., and Scott, J. (eds) 2021. Contemporary challenges to EU legality (Collected Courses of the Academy of European Law; XXIX/1). Oxford University Press.
- Kilpatrick, C., and Scott, J. (eds) 2020. New legal approaches to studying the Court of justice : revisiting law in context (Collected Courses of the Academy of European Law; XXVIII). Oxford University Press.
