= Peter Cooper (psychopathologist) =

Peter J. Cooper, FBA is a British psychopathologist and academic. He is Professor of Psychopathology at the University of Reading. He was elected a fellow of the British Academy in 2016. Cooper is a specialist in intergenerational transmission of psychopathology, child cognitive and socio-emotional development in the developing world, and the development evaluation and dissemination of parenting interventions.

== Selected works ==
- Murray, Lynne; Cooper, Peter J., eds. (1997). Postpartum Depression And Child Development. New York: Guilford Press. ISBN 978-1572301979.
- Cooper, Peter J., ed. (1993). Overcoming Bulimia Nervosa and Binge-Eating (PDF). London: Robinson. ISBN 9781849010757.
