= Anne Fuchs =

Professor Anne Fuchs FBA MRIA

Academic background
- Education: University of Konstanz
- Thesis: Dramaturgie des Narrentums. Das Komische in der Prosa Robert Walsers (1991)

Academic work
- Discipline: Modern German literature and culture
- Sub-discipline: Memory studies Temporality studies Modernism Intermediality
- Institutions: University College Dublin

Anne Fuchs, FBA MRIA is an academic specialist on modern and post-war German literature and culture.

== Career ==
Fuchs studied German and English Literature at the University of Konstanz, obtaining her M.A. in 1988 and her doctorate in 1991. Her doctoral dissertation on humour in the prose of the Swiss writer Robert Walser was published as Dramaturgie des Narrentums. Das Komische in der Prosa Robert Walsers (Munich, Fink, 1993). Her research addresses German cultural memory since 1945, German literature in the 20th and 21st centuries, German-Jewish literature, modernism, and the experience of time and temporality in modern culture. For a number of years she has been particularly concerned with "German memory contests", i.e. a series of intensely fought public debates about German cultural identity in the aftermath of the Holocaust, World War II and unification. The growing distance to the Nazi past and unification have led to a new memory contest that concerns the legacy of the GDR and of the old Federal Republic in the context of globalisation.

She went on to work at University College London, and from 1992 to 2010 at University College Dublin, where she became Professor of Modern German Literature and Culture. She moved to the University of St Andrews in 2011 and then to the University of Warwick, as Professor of German Studies, in 2012. In 2016 she returned to University College Dublin as Director of the UCD Humanities Institute.

In 2009, she was elected a member of the Royal Irish Academy (MRIA). In 2014, she was elected a Fellow of the British Academy (FBA), the United Kingdom's national academy for the humanities and social sciences.

== Publications ==
Monographs:

- Dramaturgie des Narrentums: Das Komische in der Prosa Robert Walsers. [Series: Theorie und Geschichte der Literatur und der schönen Künste, ed. by Manfred Fuhrmann, Wolfgang Iser, Hans Robert Jauss, Wolfgang Preisendanz], Munich: Fink, pp. 191.
- A Space of Anxiety: Dislocation and Abjection in Modern German-Jewish Literature.[Amsterdamer Publikationen zur Sprache und Literatur, 138], Rodopi: Amsterdam, pp. 200
- "Die Schmerzensspuren der Geschichte": Zur Poetik der Erinnerung in W.G. Sebalds Prosa. Weimar, Vienna, Cologne: Böhlau, 2004.
- Phantoms of War in Contemporary German Literature, Films and Discourse: The Politics of Memory. Basingstoke, Houndmills: Palgrave Macmillan, 2008. 2nd paperback ed. 2010
- After the Dresden Bombing: Pathways of Memory, 1945 to the Present. Basingstoke, Houndmills: Palgrave Macmillan, 2012.
- Precarious Times. Temporality and History in Modern German Culture. Ithaca: Cornell University Press: Cornell University Press 2019.

Select edited books/special issues

- Ästhetische Eigenzeit in Contemporary Literature and Culture, special issue, eds. Anne Fuchs and Ines Detmer, Oxford German Studies vol. 46.3 and 46.4 (2017).
- Time in German Literature and Culture, 1900 – 2015: between Acceleration and Slowness, eds. Anne Fuchs and J.J. Long. Basingstoke: Palgrave Macmillan, 2016 (Palgrave Series in Modern European Literature).
- Transformations of German Cultural Identity 1989-2009, special issue eds. Anne Fuchs and Kathleen James-Chakraborty. New german critique 116 vol. 39 (2012).
- Debating German Cultural Identity since 1989, eds Anne Fuchs, Kathleen James-Chakraborty, Linda Shortt. Rochester: Camden House,2011, pp. 256.
- W. G. Sebald and The Writing of History, eds Anne Fuchs and J.J. Long. Würzburg: Königshausen & Neumann, 2007, pp. 223.
- German Memory Contests: The Quest for Identity in Literature, Film and Discourse since 1990, eds Anne Fuchs, Mary Cosgrove and Georg Grote. Rochester: Camden House, 2006; pp. 344.
- Memory Contests, ed. and introduced by Anne Fuchs and Mary Cosgrove. special issue German Life & Letters 59/2 (2006).
- Cultural Memory: Essays on European Literature and History, eds Edric Caldicott and Anne Fuchs. Oxford: Peter Lang, 2003, pp. 422.
- Sentimente, Gefühle Empfindungen: Zur Geschichte und Literatur des Affektiven von 1770 bis heute, eds Anne Fuchs and Sabine Strümper-Krobb. Würzburg: Königshausen & Neumann, 2003 pp. 272.
- Ghetto Writing. Traditional and Eastern Jewry in German-Jewish Ghetto Writing from Heine to Hilsenrath, eds Anne Fuchs and Florian Krobb [Series: Studies in German Literature, Linguistics and Culture]. Drawer, Columbia: Camden House: 1999, pp. 232.
- Reisen im Diskurs. Modelle der literarischen Fremderfahrung von den Pilgerberichten bis zur Postmoderne, eds Anne Fuchs and Theo Harden [Series: Neue Bremer Beiträge, ed. by Hans-Wolf Jäger und Gert Sautermeister]. Heidelberg: Carl Winter Universitätsverlag, pp. 686.
