= Robert I. Frost =

British historian and academic

Robert I. Frost FBA FRSE
- Born: June 20, 1958 (age 68)
- Citizenship: United Kingdom
- Title: Burnett-Fletcher Chair of History

Academic background
- Education: University of St Andrews; Jagiellonian University; UCL School of Slavonic and East European Studies
- Doctoral advisor: Norman Davies

Academic work
- Era: Early modern period
- Discipline: History
- Sub-discipline: Polish–Lithuanian Commonwealth, Military history
- Institutions: King's College London; University of Aberdeen
- Main interests: Eastern and Northern European history

Robert I. Frost FBA FRSE (born 20 June 1958/1960) is a British historian and academic. His interests are in the history of Eastern and Northern Europe of the 14th to the 19th centuries, with a primary focus on the Polish–Lithuanian Commonwealth and the history of warfare of the period.

== Biography ==
Frost attended the University of St Andrews and the Jagiellonian University in Kraków, Poland. He earned his doctorate at the UCL School of Slavonic and East European Studies under Norman Davies.

Frost was a schoolmaster for three years in the mid-1980s. He became a temporary and permanent lecturer in history at King's College London, in 1987 and 1988 respectively, and Reader in 2001. He served as head of department there for three years. In 2004, he was appointed professor of early modern history at the University of Aberdeen, and there he served as head of the School of Divinity, History and Philosophy from 2004 to 2009. In 2013, he was appointed to the Burnett-Fletcher Chair of History.

== Bibliography ==
- The Northern Wars, War, State and Society in Northeastern Europe, 1558-1721, 2000
- After the Deluge: Poland–Lithuania and the Second Northern War, 1655-1660, 1994
- Co-editor, with Anne Goldgar, Institutional Culture in Early Modern Society, 2004
- The Oxford History of Poland–Lithuania (The Oxford History of Early Modern Europe)
  - Vol. I: "The Making of the Polish–Lithuanian Union, 1385-1569", 2015, ISBN 0198208693
