= Ewan Ferlie =

British social scientist

Ewan Balfour Ferlie FBA (born May 1956) is a British social scientist, whose work has made an important contribution to the academic literature on public sector management. He has published widely and internationally on narratives of public management reform and also on questions of organizational change in public services organizations, especially in health care and higher education. His well-cited works include co-authored monographs, Oxford University Press handbooks and peer reviewed articles. He is currently professor of public services management at King's College London.

== Education ==
Ewan Ferlie was originally educated at Kenilworth Grammar School and then Balliol College, Oxford (BA then Master of Arts, Oxon |MA]) with a first-class degree in Modern History 1977, also awarded the Roger Hall prize in history; then a MSc in Social Research and Social Policy at also at Oxford 1979). In 1986, he received a PhD in Social Policy from the University of Kent. He was President of Oxford University Liberal Society in 1976.

== Career ==
After leaving Oxford, Ewan Ferlie first worked as a researcher in the Personal Social Services Research Unit at the University of Kent (1979–86) where he also studied for his PhD (1986) and then in the Centre for Corporate Strategy and Change at Warwick Business School (1986-1997). He was a professor of public services management and then Director of Research at Imperial College Management School from 1997 to 2003. He was Professor and Head of the School of Management at Royal Holloway, University of London (2003-2008). He was head of the Department of Management at King's College London between 2008 and 2011.

He was a co-founder, chair and trustee of the Society for Studies in Organizing Healthcare, a learned society within the Academy of Social Sciences.

== Honors, awards and recognition ==
In 2008, Ewan Ferlie was elected a fellow of the Academy of Social Sciences. He was elected a fellow of the British Academy in 2016.

His co-authored paper "The nonspread of innovations: The mediating role of professionals" received the Academy of Management Journal Best Article Award for 2005.

== List of key works ==
Pettigrew, A., Ferlie, E. and McKee, L. (1992) Shaping Strategic Change. London: Sage.

Ferlie, E., Ashburner. L. Fitzgerald, L. and Pettigrew, A., (1996) The New Public Management in Action. Oxford: Oxford University Press.

Ferlie, E.B. and Shortell, S.M., 2001. Improving the quality of health care in the United Kingdom and the United States: A framework for change. The Milbank Quarterly, 79(2), pp. 281–315.

Ferlie, E., Fitzgerald, L., Wood, M. and Hawkins, C., 2005. The nonspread of innovations: The mediating role of professionals. Academy of Management Journal, 48(1), pp. 117–134.

Ferlie, E., Lynn Jr, L.E. and Pollitt, C. eds., 2005. The Oxford Handbook of Public Management. Oxford University Press.

Ferlie, E., Fitzgerald, L., McGivern, G., Dopson, S. and Bennett, C., 2013. Making wicked problems governable? The case of managed networks in health care. Oxford University Press.

Ferlie, E. and Ongaro, E., 2015. Strategic Management in Public Services Organizations: Concepts, Schools and Contemporary Issues. Routledge.

Ferlie, E., Montgomery, K. and Pedersen, A.R. eds., 2016. The Oxford Handbook of Health Care Management. Oxford University Press.
