= Lynne Murray =

British psychopathologist

Lynne Murray, FBA is a British psychopathologist and academic, specialising in child development. She is Professor of Developmental Psychology at the University of Reading. She has authored The Social Baby (2000) and The Psychology of Babies (2014), in addition to more than 200 academic papers.

== Honours ==
In July 2017, Murray was elected a Fellow of the British Academy (FBA), the United Kingdom's national academy for the humanities and social sciences.

== Selected works ==
- Murray, Lynne; Cooper, Peter J., eds. (1997). Postpartum Depression And Child Development. New York: Guilford Press. ISBN 978-1572301979.
- Murray, Lynne; Andrews, Liz (2000). The Social Baby. Richmond: CP Publishing. ISBN 978-1903275016.
- Murray, Lynne (2014). The psychology of babies: how relationships support development from birth to two. London: Robinson. ISBN 978-1849012935.
