= Richard Widdess =

British musicologist and academic

David Richard Widdess, FBA (born 8 June 1951) is a musicologist and academic. Since 2005, he has been Professor of Musicology at the School of Oriental and African Studies, University of London.

== Career ==
Born on 8 June 1951, David Richard Widdess completed his undergraduate studies at Gonville and Caius College, Cambridge, graduating in 1972 with a Bachelor of Arts degree in music. The following year, he received the Bachelor of Music degree from the University of Cambridge, before earning a Master of Arts degree in South-East Asian area studies at the School of Oriental and African Studies, University of London (SOAS), in 1974. He returned to Cambridge to carry out his doctoral studies under the supervision of Laurence Picken (1974–79); his PhD was awarded in 1981 for his thesis "Early Indian musical forms: a study of notated examples from sources c. 600–1250". From 1977 to 1979, he was a research fellow at Christ's College, Cambridge, and remained there as Director of Music Studies (from 1978 to 1982). In 1979, he was appointed to a lectureship in Indian music at SOAS; Widdess was promoted to a senior lectureship in ethnomusicology in 1992, and then to a readership six years later. He was head of the Department of Music at SOAS from 1999 to 2002, and since 2005 has been Professor Musicology at the institution. He was also co-editor of the British Journal of Ethnomusicology from 1992 to 1997.

According to his British Academy profile, Widdess's research focuses on the "musicology of South Asia, including history, theory, analysis and social context of music in North India and Nepal", as well as "music and religion in South Asia; analysis of world music; [and] music cognition, performance and meaning in oral traditions".

== Awards and honours ==
In 2006, Widdess received the Music Forum (Mumbai) Award for contributions to Indian Music. In 2015, Widdess was elected a Fellow of the British Academy, the United Kingdom's national academy for humanities and social sciences.

== Selected publications ==
- (Co-editor with R. F. Wolpert) Music and Tradition: Essays on Asian and Other Musics Presented to Laurence Picken (Cambridge University Press, 1981).
- (Editor) Musica Asiatica, vol. 5 (Cambridge University Press, 1988).
- The Rāgas of Early Indian Music: Modes, Melodies and Musical Notations from the Gupta period to c. 1250 (Clarendon Press, 1995).
- (Co-author with Ritwik Sanyal) Dhrupad: Tradition and Performance in Indian Music (Ashgate, 2004).
