= Dimitri Vayanos =

Dimitri Vayanos, FBA, is an economist and academic. Since 2004, he has been professor of finance at the London School of Economics.

== Education ==
Vayanos graduated with a Diplôme d'Ingénieur from the École Polytechnique in Paris in 1988, and then completed his doctoral studies at the Massachusetts Institute of Technology (MIT); his PhD was awarded in 1993 with a thesis entitled "Three essays in microeconomic theory"; his doctoral adviser was Jean Tirole.

== Career ==
From 1993 to 1997, Vayanos was an assistant professor of economics at Stanford University; he then joined MIT as an assistant professor of finance, and was promoted to an associate professorship in 2001. In 2004, he moved to the London School of Economics to be professor of finance and director of the Paul Woolley Centre for Study of Capital Market Dysfunctionality. According to his British Academy profile, Vayanos's research focuses on "financial markets, and especially on what drives market liquidity, why asset prices can differ from assets' fundamental values, why bubbles and crises can occur, and what are appropriate regulatory and policy responses".

Between 2011 and 2015, Vayanos was editor of The Review of Economic Studies.

He was elected a Fellow of the British Academy, the United Kingdom's national academy for the humanities and social sciences, in 2014.
