= Sean Connolly (academic) =

Irish historian and gay rights activist who died in 2026

Sean Joseph Connolly, FBA, MRIA, FRHistS (born 9 December 1951) is an Irish historian, initially specialising in the social history of Irish Catholicism in the late eighteenth and early nineteenth centuries, but more recently on post-Reformation and early modern Ireland and modern Belfast. From 1996 to 2017, he was professor of Irish history at Queen's University Belfast, and has been emeritus professor there since 2017. After completing his undergraduate degree at University College, Dublin, and his doctorate at the University of Ulster, Connolly worked as an archivist at Public Record Office of Ireland from 1977 to 1980, before spending a year lecturing in history at St Patrick's College, Dublin; he returned to the University of Ulster in 1981 as a lecturer and became a reader there in 1990. Connolly was also Vice-President of the Royal Historical Society from 2014 to 2016, and was twice editor of the journal Irish Economic and Social History (from 1982 to 1990, and from 2000 to 2002).

== Honours ==
In July 2016, Connolly was elected a Fellow of the British Academy (FBA), the United Kingdom's national academy for the humanities and social sciences. He was also elected a Member of the Royal Irish Academy in 1995 and is a Fellow of the Royal Historical Society.

== Selected works ==
- Priests and People in Pre-Famine Ireland 1780–1845, 1982
- Religion and Society in Nineteenth-Century Ireland (Dublin: Economic and Social History Society of Ireland, 1985).
- Religion, Law and Power: the making of Protestant Ireland 1660–1760, 1992
- (Editor) Conflict and Identity: Scotland and Ireland 1500-1939 (Carnegie Publishing, 1995).
- (Editor) The Oxford Companion to Irish History (Oxford: Oxford University Press, 1998).
- (Editor) Kingdoms United? Great Britain and Ireland since 1500: Integration and Diversity (Dublin: Four Courts Press, 1998).
- (Editor) Political Ideas in Eighteenth-Century Ireland (Dublin: Four Courts Press, 2000).
- Contested Island: Ireland 1460–1630, Oxford History of Early Modern Europe (Oxford: Oxford University Press, 2007).
- Divided Kingdom: Ireland 1630–1800, Oxford History of Early Modern Europe (Oxford: Oxford University Press, 2008).
- (Editor) Belfast 400: People, Place and History (Liverpool University Press, 2012).
