= Thomas Corns =

British literary scholar

Thomas Nicholas Corns, FBA (born 1949), is a literary scholar. He was Professor English Literature at Bangor University from 1994 to 2014.

== Career ==
Thomas Nicholas Corns was born in Prescot. After attending the city's grammar school, he was educated at Brasenose College, Oxford, graduating in 1972. He completed his doctoral studies at University College, Oxford; his DPhil was awarded in 1978 for his thesis "Studies in the development of Milton's prose style". Corns joined the University College of North Wales at Bangor as a lecturer in 1975, and was promoted to a senior lectureship in 1987. In 1992, he was appointed to a readership there, and then in 1994 became Professor of English Literature. By the time he retired in 2014, the institution had become Bangor University; he remains there as an emeritus professor. Corns also spent time as head of his department, head of the School of Arts and, between 2004 and 2007, as Pro-Vice-Chancellor at the university.

According to his British Academy profile, Corns's research entails "the historically-informed study of seventeenth-century English literature; scholarly editing of seventeenth-century texts; [and] stylistic criticism". He is a specialist on John Milton and has published widely on him and the mid-17th-century political literature.

== Honours and awards ==
In 2015, Corns was elected a Fellow of the British Academy, the United Kingdom's national academy for the humanities and social sciences. In 1997 he gave the British Academy's Warton Lecture on English Poetry.

== Selected publications ==
- The Development of Milton’s Prose Style, Oxford English Monographs (Clarendon Press, 1982).
- Milton’s Language (Basil Blackwell, 1990).
- Uncloistered Virtue: English political literature, 1640–1660 (Clarendon Press, 1992).
- (Editor) The Cambridge Companion to English Poetry: Donne to Marvell (Cambridge University Press, 1993).
- Regaining Paradise Lost (Longman, 1994).
- John Milton: The Prose Works (Twayne Publishers, 1998).
- (Editor) The Royal Image: Representations of Charles I (Cambridge University Press, 1999).
- (Editor) Blackwell Companion to Milton (Blackwell, 2001).
- A History of Seventeenth-Century English Literature (Blackwell, 2006).
- (Co-authored with Gordon Campbell, John Hale and Fiona Tweedie) John Milton and the Manuscript of De Doctrina Christiana (Oxford University Press, 2007).
- (Co-authored with Gordon Campbell) John Milton: Life, Work, and Thought (Oxford University Press, 2008).
- (Co-edited with David Loewenstein and Ann Hughes) The Complete Works of Gerrard Winstanley, 2 vols. (Oxford University Press, 2009).
- (Editor) The Milton Encyclopedia (Yale University Press, 2012).
- (Editor) A New Companion to Milton (Wiley-Blackwell, 2016).
