= Katrin Flikschuh =

Professor of political theory

Katrin Flikschuh (2016)

Katrin A. Flikschuh FBA is professor of political theory at the London School of Economics (LSE). Flikschuh's research interests relate to the political philosophy of Immanuel Kant, metaphysics and meta-level justification in contemporary political philosophy, global justice and cosmopolitanism, and the history of modern political thought.

== Education ==
Flikschuh earned her BA at the University of Essex and her MSc from the School of Oriental and African Studies. She received her PhD from the University of Essex.

== Professional career ==
Flikschuh was a lecturer in philosophy at the University of Essex and has held lectureships in philosophy at the University of Bristol and in politics at the University of Manchester. She joined the LSE Government Department in 2003.

In 2014, Flikschuh was elected a fellow of the British Academy, the United Kingdom's national academy for the humanities and social sciences.

Flikschuh has travelled throughout West Africa. She was appointed Principal Investigator of a Leverhulme Trust International Networks Project, which explores connections between African and Western social and political thought.

Flikschuh speaks French and German.

== Books ==
She published her book "Kant and Modern Political Philosophy" in 2000 (paperback edition was published in 2008). In this book she speaks about the relevance of Kant's political thought to major issues and problems in contemporary political philosophy.

== Athletics ==
Flikschuh has a marathon personal best of 3:14:27. This ranks as the all-time fifth best performance for the UK Women's V60 category.

== Selected publications ==
- Kant and Modern Political Philosophy. Cambridge University Press, Cambridge, 2000. ISBN 9780521662376
- Freedom: Contemporary Liberal Perspectives. Key Concepts. Polity, Cambridge, 2007. ISBN 9780745624372
- What is Orientation in Global Thinking? A Kantian Inquiry. Cambridge University Press, Cambridge, 2017. ISBN 9780511777264
- "Reason, right, and revolution: Kant and Locke." Philosophy and Public Affairs, 36 (4), 2008, pp. 375–404.
- "On the cogency of human rights", Jurisprudence, 2 (1), 2011. pp. 17–36.
