= Gordon Campbell (scholar) =

Gordon Campbell FBA (born 1944) is a professor of Renaissance Studies at the University of Leicester known for his work on Milton and on the King James Bible. Campbell is one of the "world's leading authorities on the King James Bible." He has published extensively in a number of areas.

== Work ==
The Guardian called Campbell's book on Milton the "definitive biography" of our era.

In 2021, in a new book and an article for Time, Campbell discusses the Norse colonization of North America as being distorted for political ends, including some which promote white supremacy.

== Books ==
- (With Thomas Corns) John Milton: Life, Work and Thought (Oxford University Press, 2008)
- Bible: the Story of the King James Version 1611-2011 (Oxford University Press, 2010)
- The Hermit in the Garden: from Imperial Rome to Ornamental Gnome (Oxford University Press, 2013)
- Norse America: The Story of a Founding Myth (Oxford University Press, 2021)
