= Geohumanities =

Interdisciplinary field of study

Geohumanities, sometimes written GeoHumanities or The GeoHumanities, is a term that has been used with varied meanings to describe areas of academic study.

The book GeoHumanities: Art, History, Text at the Edge of Place was published in 2011 edited by Michael Dear and others, and "explores the humanities' rapidly expanding engagement with geography, and the multi-methodological inquiries that analyze the meanings of place, and then reconstructs those meanings to provoke new knowledge as well as the possibility of altered political practices." A reviewer in Time + Space described it as "a terrific introduction to a segment of interdisciplinary studies which seems to be on the verge of explosion", while the reviewer for the Annals of the American Association of Geographers said:

The contribution of the book lies in its "breaching" (as the editors put it) of the conventional boundaries between geography and the humanities rather than the conventional liberal-arts-college sense of a set of discrete fields engaging with one another for mutual benefit. It is, if you like, trans- rather than interdisciplinary.

The GeoHumanities Special Interest Group of the Alliance of Digital Humanities Organizations was established in 2013, focusing on "geospatial and spatial-temporal perspectives in the digital humanities".

The journal Geohumanities has been published since 2015 by the American Association of Geographers, and "span[s] conceptual and methodological debates in geography and the humanities; critical reflections on analog and digital artistic productions; and new scholarly interactions occurring at the intersections of geography and multiple humanities disciplines".

The Centre for the GeoHumanities of Royal Holloway, University of London (established in or before 2016) describes itself as

a major initiative linking arts and humanities scholars and practitioners, geographers and the creative, cultural and heritage sectors. It showcases and fosters work with an arts and humanities orientation on issues that have a strong geographical resonance, such as space, place, landscape and environment.

and states:

The GeoHumanities also have a longer intellectual history rooted in the pre-disciplinary origins of Geography as ‘earth writing’. Geography has never been the exclusive preserve of geographers and has always posed a challenge to modern disciplinary thinking.

As of April 2025 the word geohumanitities does not appear in the online Oxford English Dictionary.
