= Lucia Zedner =

British legal scholar (born 1961)

Lucia Zedner FBA
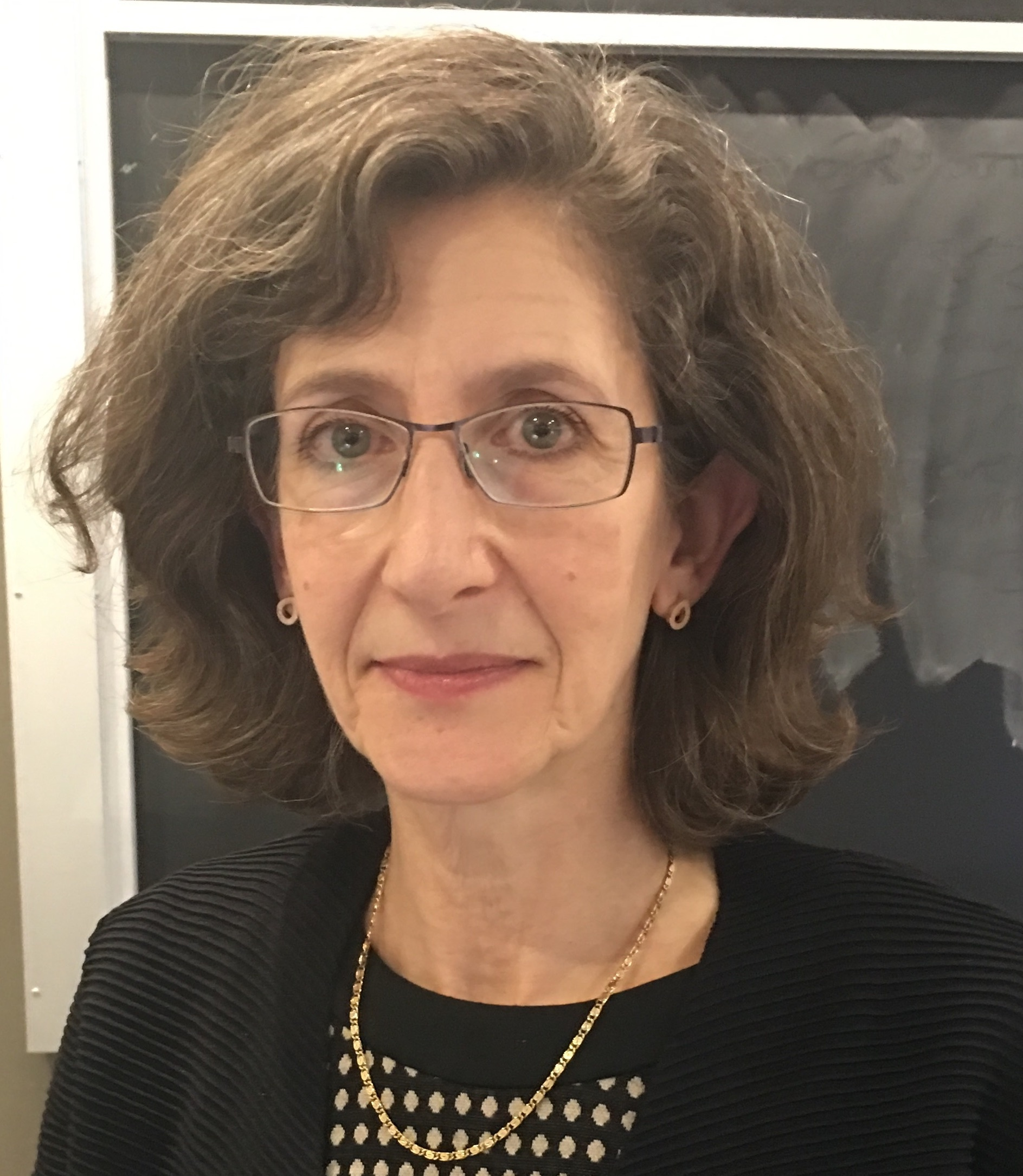
- Zedner in October 2017
- Born: 20 February 1961 (age 65); Kingston, Surrey, England

Academic background
- Education: University of York (BA); Nuffield College, Oxford (DPhil)

Academic work
- Discipline: Criminal justice
- Institutions: London School of Economics; University of Oxford

Lucia Zedner FBA (born 20 February 1961) is a British legal scholar. She is a professor of criminal justice at the University of Oxford and a senior fellow of All Souls College, Oxford.

== Biography ==
Zedner was born on 20 February 1961 in Kingston, Surrey, England. She studied at the University of York, graduating with a Bachelor of Arts (BA) degree. She studied for her doctorate at Nuffield College, Oxford, between 1984 and 1989. Her doctoral thesis was titled "The criminality of women and its control in England 1850–1914".

She became a Member of the Centre for Criminology (1988), and a Prize Research Fellow. She later became a lecturer in Law at the London School of Economics where she was, beginning in 1991, assistant director of the Manheim Centre for Criminology and Criminal Justice. In 1994, Zedner returned to Oxford to become a Law Fellow at Corpus Christi College and rejoined the Centre for Criminology. She held a two-year British Academy Research Readership from 2003 to 2005. She was awarded the title of reader in 1999 and of Professor of Criminal Justice in 2005. In 2012, she was elected as a Fellow of the British Academy (FBA).

== Publications ==
Zedner's teaching and research interests include penal theory, comparative criminology, victims, security, risk and anti-terrorist policy. Some of Zedner's publications, collaborations, with reviews, include:

- Women, Crime and Custody in Victorian England, (1991)
  Journal of Interdisciplinary History, Spring, 1994, vol. 24, no. 4, p. 711–712.
  Albion: A Quarterly Journal Concerned with British Studies, Winter, 1992, vol. 24, no. 4, p. 683–684.
  The American Journal of Legal History, Jan., 1993, vol. 37, no. 1, p. 112–113.
  Review, Law and History Review, Spring, 1996, vol. 14, no. 1, p. 128–131.
- Child Victims in the Criminal Justice System (with Jane Morgan, 1992)
  Social Legal Studies Little 2 (1): 118. Social Legal Studies
  The Modern Law Review, Jul., 1993, vol. 56, no. 4, p. 611–613.
- The Criminological Foundations of Penal Policy, co-edited with Andrew Ashworth (2003)
- Criminal Justice (2004)
  D. Downes, British Society of Criminology Newsletter
- Security London: Routledge, 2009.

ResearchGate, the social networking site for scientists and researchers, lists 39 publications by Lucia Zedner.
