= Julian Johnson (academic) =

English musicologist (born 1963)

Julian Michael Johnson FBA (born 1 July 1963) is a musicologist, specialising in music history and the aesthetics of modern music. Since 2013, he has been Regius Professor of Music at Royal Holloway, University of London. After completing his undergraduate degree at Pembroke College, Cambridge, Johnson studied for his master's degree at the University of Sussex, which also awarded him his doctorate in 1994. He then lectured at Sussex until 2001, when he became a reader in the University of Oxford's Faculty of Music, and a fellow of St Anne's College, Oxford. In 2007, he joined Royal Holloway as Professor of Music.

== Honours ==
In July 2017, Johnson was elected a Fellow of the British Academy (FBA), the United Kingdom's national academy for the humanities and social sciences.

== Selected works ==
- Johnson, Julian (2012). Classical Music: A Beginner's Guide. Oneworld Publications. ISBN 978-1-78074-141-3.
- Johnson, Julian (1999). Webern and the Transformation of Nature. Cambridge: Cambridge University Press. ISBN 9780521027861.
- Who Needs Classical Music? Cultural Choice and Musical Value (New York: Oxford University Press, 2002).
- Mahler's Voices: Expression and Irony in the Songs and Symphonies (Oxford: Oxford University Press, 2009).
- Out of Time: Music and the Making of Modernity (New York: Oxford University Press, 2015).
- (Edited with Guldbrandsen) Transformations of Musical Modernism, Music in the Twentieth Century series (Cambridge: Cambridge University Press, 2015).
- After Debussy: Music, Language, and the Margins of Philosophy (New York: Oxford University Press, 2020)
