= Cultural Geographies =

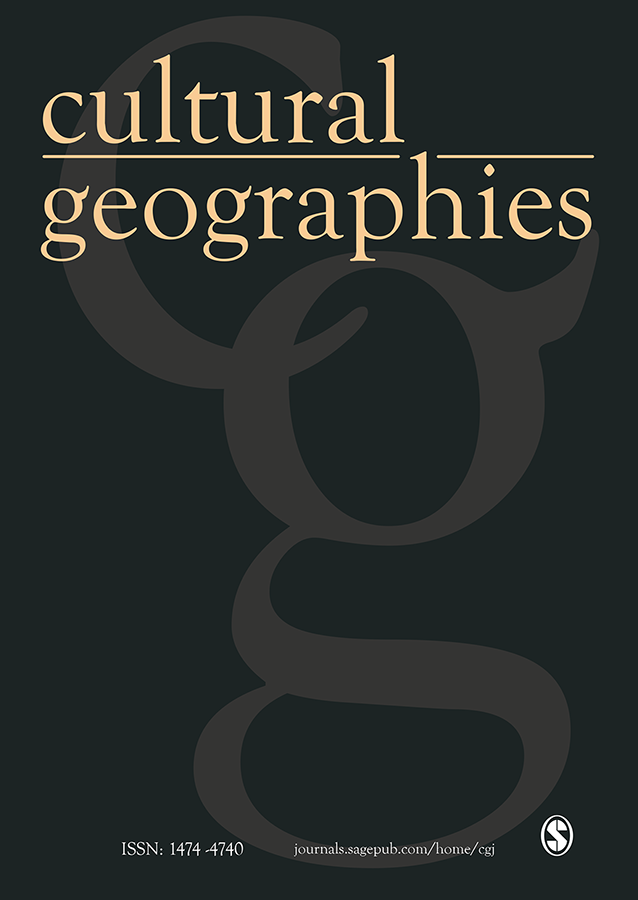
- Discipline: Cultural geography
- Language: English
- Edited by: Dydia DeLyser

Publication details
- Former name: Ecumene
- History: 1994-present
- Publisher: SAGE Publications
- Frequency: Quarterly
- Impact factor: 2.095 (2015)

Standard abbreviations
- ISO 4: Cult. Geogr.

Indexing
- ISSN: 1474-4740 (print); 1477-0881 (web)
- LCCN: 2002235404
- OCLC no.: 488157568

Links
- Journal homepage; Online access; Online archive

Cultural Geographies (stylized in lowercase as cultural geographies) is a quarterly peer-reviewed academic journal covering research and commentaries on the cultural appropriation and politics of nature, environment, place, and space. The journal was established in 1994 as Ecumene, name changed in 2002. It is published by SAGE Publications and edited by Dydia DeLyser.

== Abstracting and indexing ==
Cultural Geographies is abstracted and indexed in Scopus and the Social Sciences Citation Index. According to the Journal Citation Reports, its 2015 impact factor is 2.095, ranking it 14th out of 77 journals in the category "Geography" and 27th out of 104 in the category "Environmental Studies".
