= Stephen Daniels (geographer) =

British cultural geographer and professor

Stephen Daniels FBA FAcSS FSA FRGS
- Born: Stephen John Daniels; 11 May 1950 (age 76)
- Awards: Victoria Medal (2015)

Academic background
- Education: University of St Andrews; University of Wisconsin; University College, London
- Thesis: Moral Order and the Industrial Environment in the Woollen Textile Districts of West Yorkshire, 1780–1880 (1980)
- Doctoral advisor: Hugh Prince

Academic work
- Discipline: Geography
- Sub-discipline: Cultural geography
- Institutions: University of Nottingham
- Doctoral students: Harriet Hawkins
- Main interests: History of landscape representation, design, and management; landscape arts of 18th-century Britain; history of geographical knowledge and imagination
- Notable works: Fields of Vision (1993); The Iconography of Landscape (1998)

Stephen John Daniels FBA FAcSS FSA FRGS (born 11 May 1950) is a British cultural geographer. He was Professor of Cultural Geography, and is now Emeritus Professor, at the University of Nottingham. In 2015, he received the prestigious Victoria Medal from the Royal Geographical Society which is awarded "for conspicuous merit in research in geography".

Daniels studied at the University of St Andrews and the University of Wisconsin–Madison, before completing a PhD at University College London examined by Denis Cosgrove. He joined the University of Nottingham as a lecturer in 1980.

His research interests include the history of landscape representation, design and management, the landscape arts of eighteenth century Britain, the history of geographical knowledge and imagination. His books include the highly influential The Iconography of Landscape (1988) edited with Denis Cosgrove, Fields of Vision (1992), and Humphrey Repton: Landscape Gardening and the Geography of Georgian England (1999), and the exhibition catalogues Art of the Garden (2004) and Paul Sandby: Picturing Britain (2009). He has curated exhibitions at the Tate and Royal Academy of Arts.

He has been recognised as a Fellow of the British Academy, Fellow of the Academy of Social Sciences, Fellow of the Society of Antiquaries of London and Fellow of the Royal Geographical Society.
