= Sarah Curtis (geographer) =

British geographer and academic

Sarah Elizabeth Curtis, FBA, FRGS, FAcSS is a British geographer and academic, specialising in health geography. From 2006 to 2016, she was Professor of Health and Risk at Durham University; she is now professor emeritus. A graduate of St Hilda's College, Oxford, she was Director of the Institute of Hazard Risk and Resilience at Durham between 2012 and 2016. She previously researched and taught at the University of Kent and at Queen Mary, University of London.

== Honours ==
In 2014, Curtis was elected a Fellow of the British Academy (FBA), the United Kingdom's national academy for the humanities and social sciences. She is also a Fellow of the Academy of Social Sciences (FAcSS), and a Fellow of the Royal Geographical Society (FRGS).

== Selected works ==
- Curtis, Sarah (1989). The Geography of Public Welfare Provision. Abingdon: Routledge. ISBN 978-0-415-03472-2.
- Curtis, Sarah; Taket, Ann (1996). Health and Societies: Changing Perspectives. London: Arnold. ISBN 978-0-340-62513-2.
- Boyle, Paul; Curtis, Sarah; Graham, Elspeth; Moore, Eric, eds. (2003). The Geography of Health Inequalities in the Developed World: Views from Britain and North America. Aldershot: Ashgate. ISBN 978-0754613985.
- Curtis, Sarah (2004). Health and Inequality: Geographical Perspectives. London: SAGE Publications. ISBN 978-0-7619-6823-8.
- Curtis, Sarah (2010). Space, Place and Mental Health. Farnham: Ashgate Publishing, Ltd. ISBN 978-0-7546-7331-6.
