= Department of Geography, University of Cambridge =

Academic department of the University of Cambridge

Department of Geography
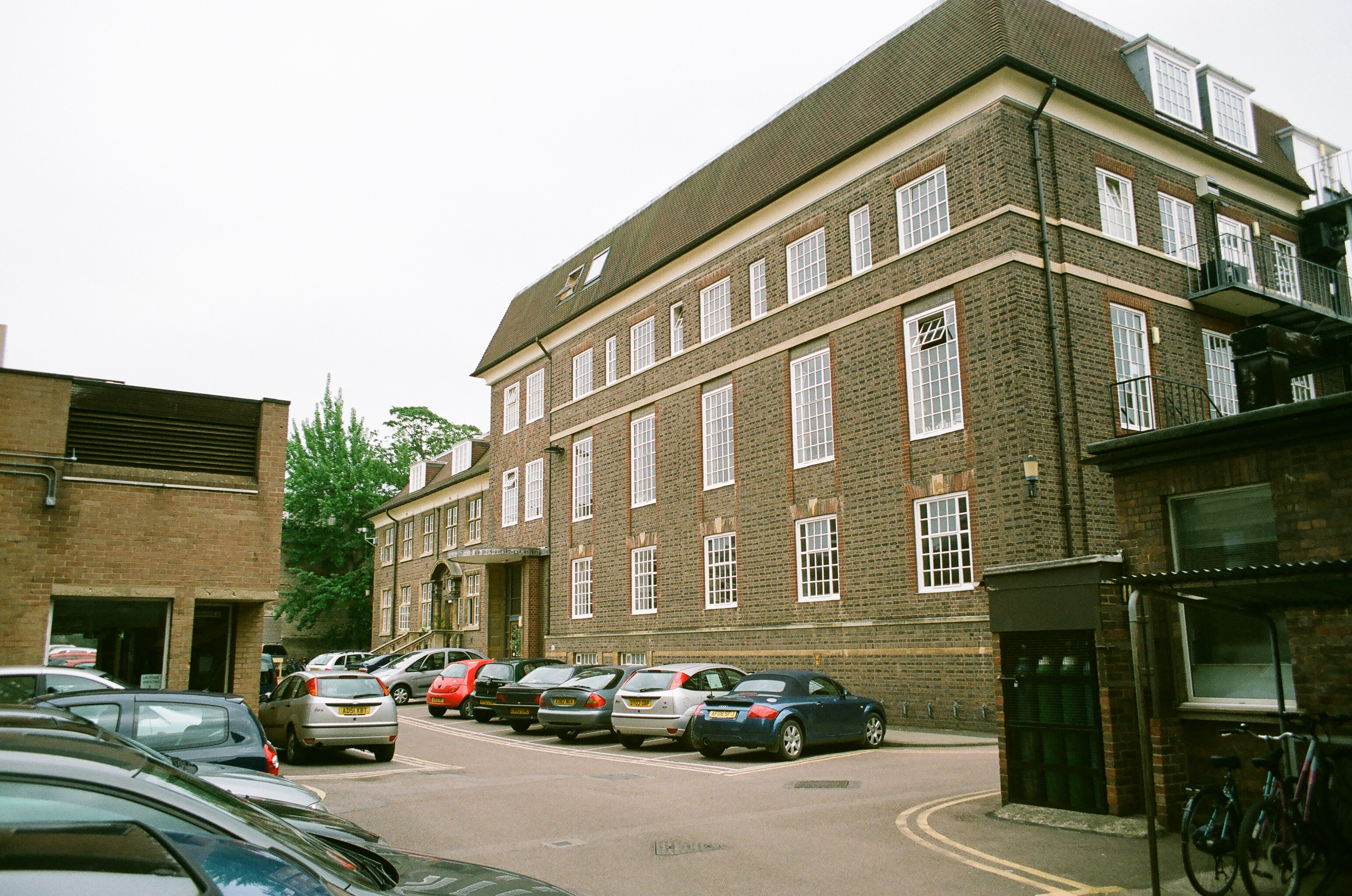
- Established: 1888
- Head of Department: Professor Emma Mawdsley
- Location: Cambridge, United Kingdom; 52.2018°N 0.1236°E
- Website: www.geog.cam.ac.uk

The Department of Geography is one of the constituent departments of the University of Cambridge and is located on the Downing Site.

The department is consistently rated amongst the best Geography departments in the world, in rankings tables.

== History ==
There is a long tradition of geography at Cambridge stretching back to the first University Lecturer in Geography, Henry Guillemard, appointed in 1888 which was funded by the Royal Geographical Society, which was keen to promote the teaching of Geography at Oxford and Cambridge.

Teaching was initially for a special examination leading to a diploma in geography. The Geographical Tripos - the examination for a B.A. degree - was established in 1919. In 1931 the first professor, Frank Debenham OBE, was appointed and in 1933 the department moved into its own accommodation. That building, which now constitutes the eastern end of the department, was considerably extended in the 1930s, with the construction of new lecture theatres and laboratories. In the 1980s, the building was further extended with the addition of a top floor to provide a new laboratory for computing, remote sensing and geographical information systems. In 1999 the department expanded again, to occupy two floors in an adjacent building where new laboratories, seminar rooms and offices are housed.

Since then, the Cambridge Group for the History of Population and Social Structure (CAMPOP) has been integrated into the teaching and research activities of the Department (2001), and the Scott Polar Research Institute became a sub-department in 2002. Today, the Department has 35 academic staff including ten professors and four readers.

== Research ==
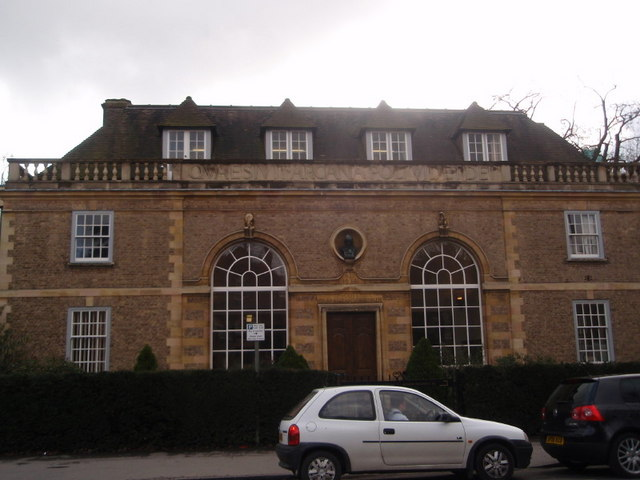
Scott Polar Research Institute, a sub-department of the Department of Geography

Research in the department is organised in the following thematic research groups:

- Vital Geographies
- Infrastructural Geographies
- Geographies of Knowledge
- Biogeography and Biogeomorphology
- Climate and Environmental Dynamics
- Glaciology and Glacial Geology

== Notable alumni and staff ==
The department has produced a range of notable alumni, including David Harvey, the world's most cited academic geographer, and winner of the Lauréat Prix International de Géographie Vautrin Lud. Other notable alumni and staff include:

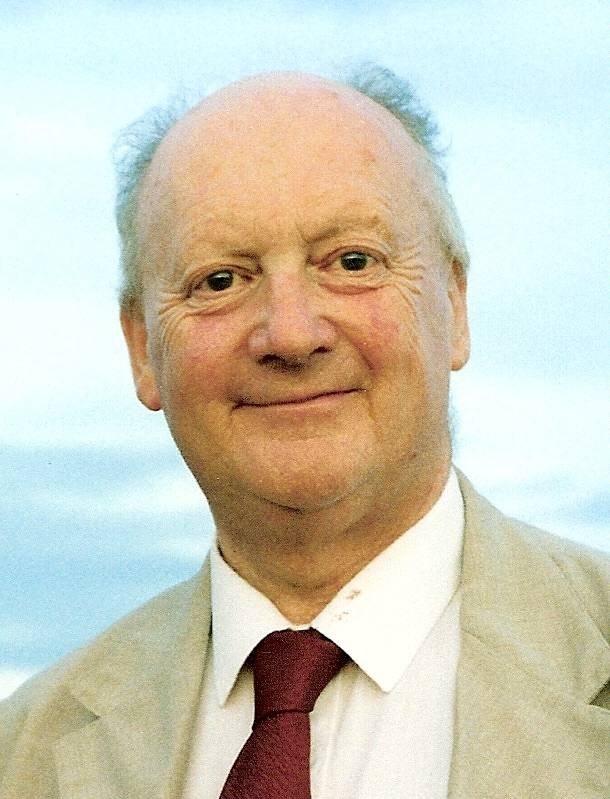
Richard Chorley, leading figure in the late 20th century for his work in quantitative geography

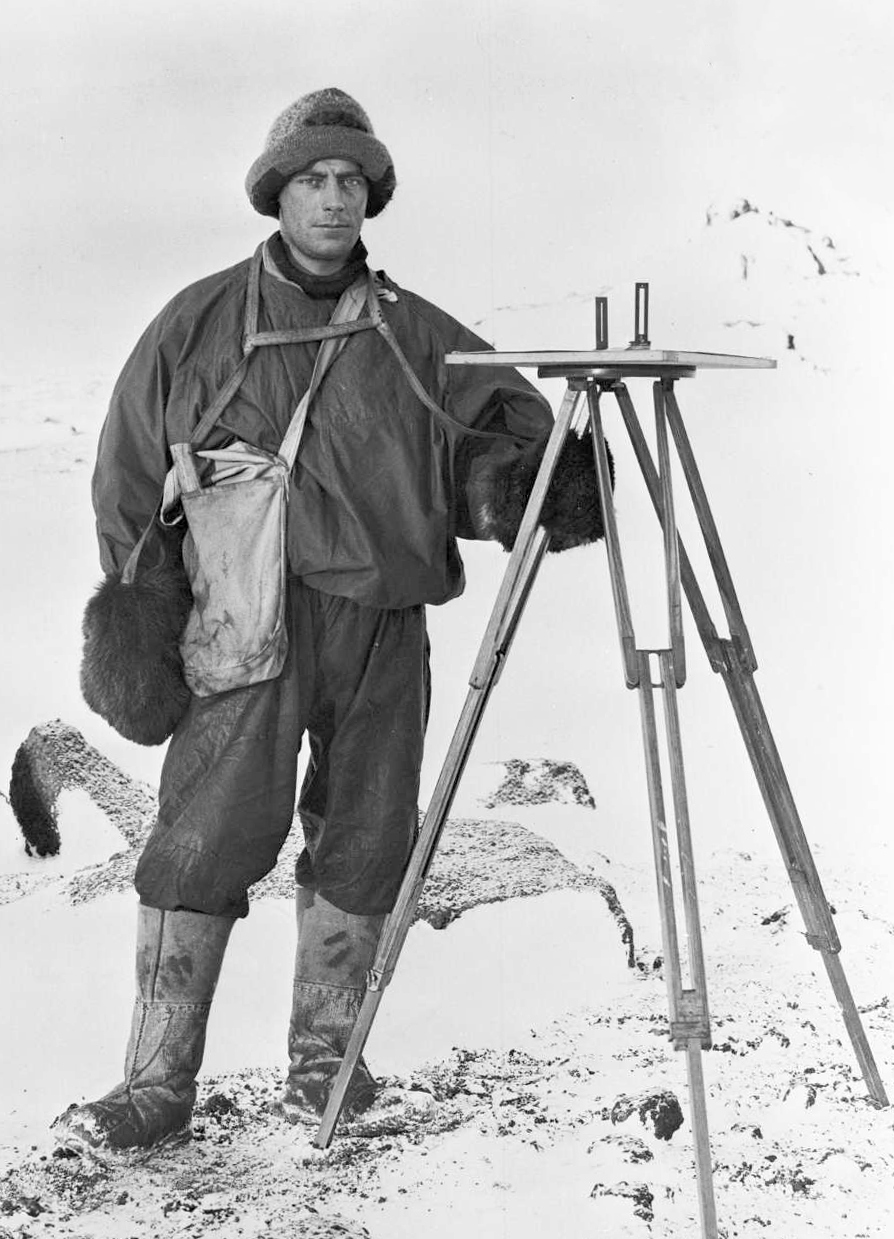
Frank Debenham, first director of the Scott Polar Research Institute

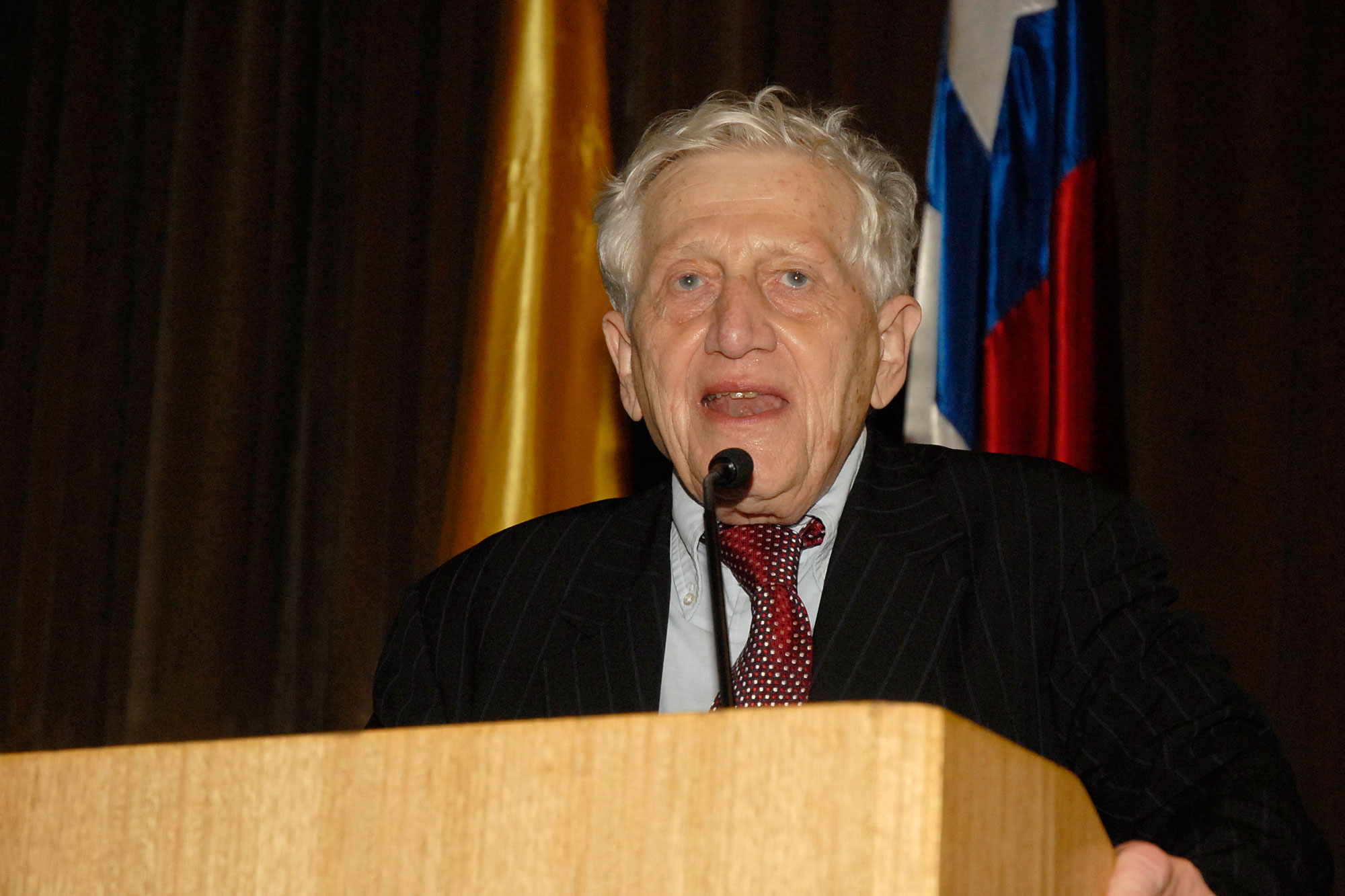
Sir Peter Hall, town planner and urbanist

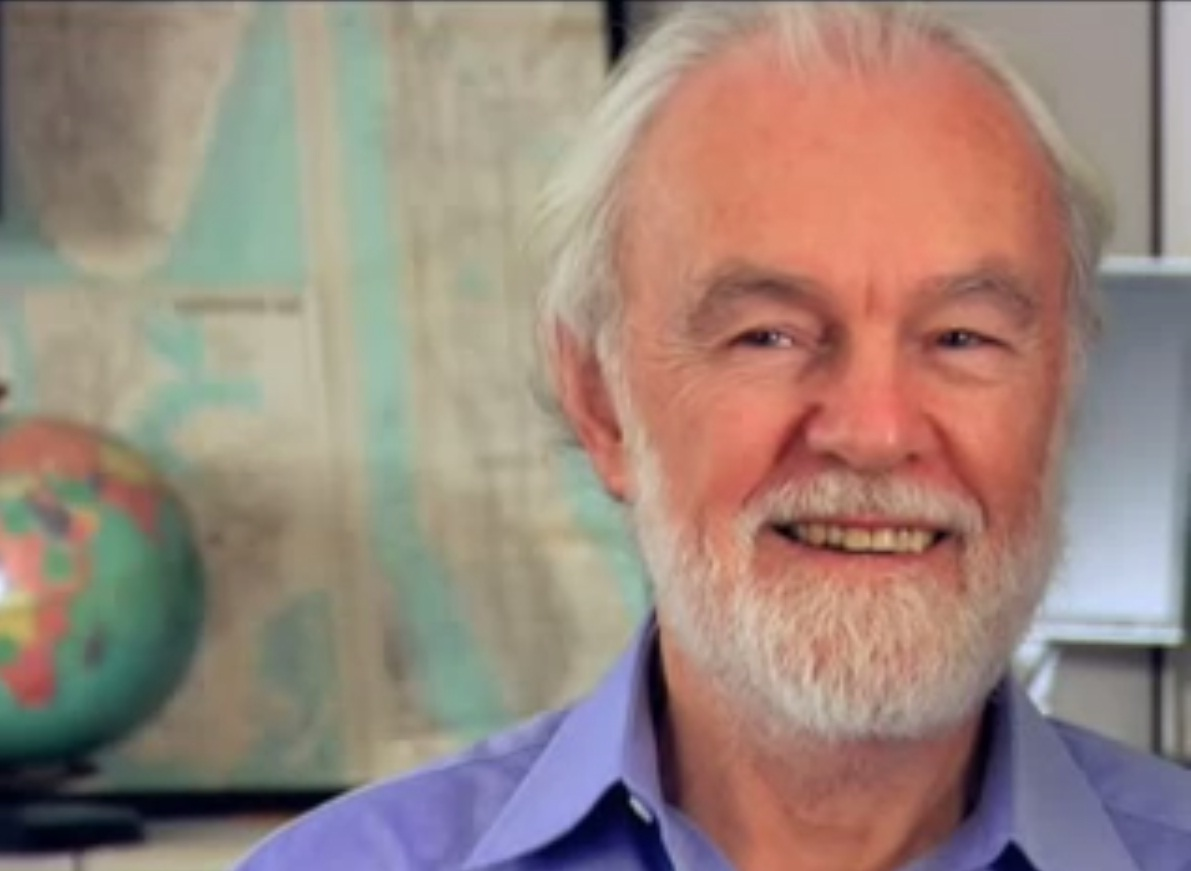
David Harvey, the world's most cited academic geographer

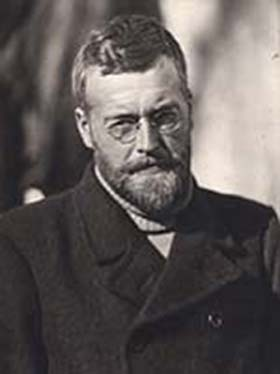
Sir James Wordie, Scottish polar explorer and geologist
- Bill Adams
- Dawn Airey
- Ash Amin
- John Barrett
- Anthony Bebbington
- Piers Blaikie
- William Maurice Brown
- Paul Brummell
- Sylvia Chant
- Richard Chorley
- Miles Clark
- Roger Clarke
- Mark Cleary
- John Terence Coppock
- Bernie Cotton
- Kevin R. Cox
- Philip Cox
- Mike Crang
- Gabriel Crouch
- Frank Debenham
- Hugh Dennis
- Robin Donkin
- Julian A. Dowdeswell
- George Freeman
- Phil Gibbard
- Andrew Goudie
- Derek Gregory
- A. T. (Dick) Grove
- Jean Grove
- Peter Haggett
- Peter Hall
- John Heap
- Michael Heffernan
- Bronwyn Hill
- Mike Hulme
- Mike Kirkby
- William Vaughan Lewis
- Hal Lister
- Sylvia Law
- Huw Lewis-Jones
- Linda McDowell
- Paul Madden
- Gordon Manley
- Ron Martin
- Ann Mather
- Michael Mortimore
- John Noble
- James Oldfield
- Joe Painter
- Chris Philo
- Luke Piper
- Matthew Price
- Sarah A. Radcliffe
- Phil Rees
- Chris Robinson
- John Rymill
- Susan J. Smith
- Oskar Spate
- Alfred Steers
- Ken Sykora
- Sam Toy
- Piers Vitebsky
- Andrew Warren
- George T. Whitesides
- David Wilshire
- Charles W. J. Withers
- James Wordie
- Tony Wrigley

== See also ==
- Professor of Geography (Cambridge)
