= Pushkin Phartyal =

Indian journalist

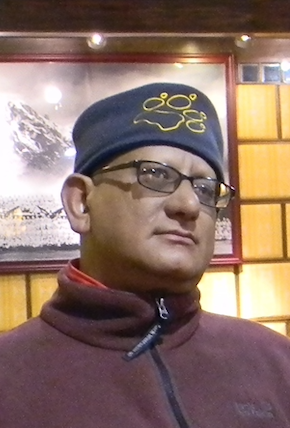
- Born: March 1968
- Died: 4 February 2016 (aged 47)
- Occupations: Journalist, social worker, environmentalist
- Known for: Work with Himalayan communities of Uttarakhand, India

Pushkin Phartyal (March 1968 – 4 February 2016) was a journalist and social worker from Uttarakhand, India. He was noted for his work in alleviating rural poverty, strengthening local institutions and rural livelihoods, and climate change mitigation in the Himalayas of Uttarakhand.

== Personal life and education ==
Phartyal had a PhD in history, postgraduate degrees in history and sociology, a postgraduate diploma in journalism and mass communication, and a diploma in tourism. At the Kumaon University, he was an active member of the National Cadet Corps, and won the gold medal for the best cadet in the Uttar Pradesh state. He was also elected as the joint secretary and the president of the student union at Kumaon University. Phartyal's friend Girish Ranjan Tiwari writes in his commemorative essay that Phartyal had been active in the student movement of 1990 and as a consequence had to spend several days in prison at Fatehgarh.

Phartyal belonged to the town of Nainital, in Uttarakhand. He was married and had a daughter.

== Career ==
After attaining his PhD, Phartyal worked as a journalist for the Hindi daily Dainik Jagran and the Press Trust of India (PTI). He remained associated with PTI till his death.

In 2003, Phartyal joined, on invitation, the Nainital-based NGO Central Himalayan Environmental Association (CHEA). In 2008, he took over as its executive director. In this capacity, he founded the Indian Mountain Initiative, later known as the Integrated Mountain Initiative, a platform for policy advocacy in relation to various interlinked issues of mountain-dwelling communities of twelve Indian states with mountains. As part of his work for CHEA, Phartyal introduced the concept of community carbon forestry with ecosystem services, trained village communities in sustainable development strategies, and worked on restoring Uttarakhand's Van Panchayats, all while actively involving the state in this work.

Phartyal represented CHEA at various UNFCCC meetings. Till early 2016, he also led CHEA's participation in the Kailash Sacred Landscape Conservation and Development Initiative, a transboundary programme between India, China, and Nepal stewarded by ICIMOD.

Phartyal served as a faculty member of the Centre for Development Studies of the Uttarakhand Academy of Administration in Nainital for seven years.

Phartyal also acted as the treasurer of the Nainital Mountaineering Club.

== Death ==
In January 2016, Phartyal was on an academic visit to the Department of Geography, Cambridge University, in collaboration with Prof. Bhaskar Vira. During this visit, a tumour was detected in Phartyal's brain. Pushkin Phartyal died in Lucknow on 4 February 2016, at the age of 47, from brain cancer.

== Recognition ==
- Phartyal was a LEAD Fellow, a Synergos Senior Fellow, and an Ashoka Fellow.
- Phartyal was conferred the National Award for Excellence in Writing for the year 1998–1999 by the Ministry of Tourism, Government of India, for his book on trekking in India. He was again conferred this award for 2000-2001 and 2001–2002, in recognition of articles written by him.
- In 2006, he was awarded a GIAN prize for his article on community-managed low-cost ropeways in Uttarakhand. This article is archived in the online library of ICIMOD.
- Over 2011–2012, he was the recipient of a Rufford Small Grant.
- In 2012, he was awarded the World of Difference Award by The International Alliance for Women, for his contributions in reducing drudgery and strengthening livelihoods for mountain women.
- In 2015, he was awarded the Social Innovation Leadership Award by the World CSR Congress.
- In February 2016, following Phartyal's sudden death, various institutions and individuals expressed condolences. These included Harish Rawat, then chief minister of Uttarakhand, and the Food and Agriculture Organisation's Mountain Partnership.
- In July 2019, a seminar in the memory of Pushkin Phartyal was organised by CHEA at Nainital. Prof. Shekhar Pathak was one of the speakers at the event.
- In December 2022, an annual Pushkin Phartyal Memorial Talk was instituted in Nainital, which would be delivered every year at CHEA's annual general meeting.

== Select bibliography ==
- Danielsen, F., Skutsch, M., Burgess, N.D., Jensen, P.M., Andrianandrasana, H., Karky, B., Lewis, R., Lovett, J.C., Massao, J., Ngaga, Y. and Phartyal, P., 2011. At the heart of REDD+: a role for local people in monitoring forests?. Conservation letters, 4(2), pp. 158–167.
- Skutsch, M.M., van Laake, P.E., Zahabu, E.M., Karky, B.S. and Phartyal, P., 2009. Community monitoring in REDD+. Realising REDD, p. 101.
- Tewari, A. and Phartyal, P., 2006. The carbon market as an emerging livelihood opportunity for communities of the Himalayas. ICIMOD Mountain Development, 49, pp. 26–27.
- Singh, I.H.S., Tewari, A. and Phartyal, P., 2012. Community carbon forestry to counter forest degradation in the Indian Himalayas. In Community Forest Monitoring for the Carbon Market (pp. 138–153). Routledge.
- Uma, P., Tej, P., Sharma, H.K., Pushkin, P., Aungsathwi, M., Tamang, N.B., Tan, K. and Munawar, M.S., 2012. Value of insect pollinators to Himalayan agricultural economies. Value of insect pollinators to Himalayan agricultural economies.
- Semwal, R.L., Bisht, R.S. and Phartyal, P., 2012. Community Forestry in the Indian Himalayan Region. Glimpses of Forestry Research in the Indian Himalayan Region, p. 25.
- Tewari, P., Mittra, B. and Phartyal, P., 2008. Perennial fodder grasses: Key for management of community forests in Indian Himalaya. In IASC 12th Biennial International Conference Governing Shared Resources: Connecting Local Experience to Global Challenges, Cheltenham, United Kingdom.
