= Kevin Cox =

Kevin Cox may refer to:

- Kevin R. Cox, British-American geographer
- Kevin Cox (politician), American politician from Oklahoma
