= Zoological Society of London =

English charity devoted to animal conservation

- Founded: 1826; 200 years ago
- Founders: Sir Stamford Raffles, Marquess of Lansdowne, Lord Auckland, Sir Humphry Davy, Sir Robert Peel, Joseph Sabine, Nicholas Aylward Vigors and others
- Type: Charitable organization within the Non-profit sector of the United Kingdom
- Purpose: To promote worldwide conservation of animals and their habitats; London Zoo and Whipsnade Zoo, research in Institute of Zoology, field conservation
- Headquarters: London, England
- Location: London Zoo, Whipsnade Zoo
- Coordinates: 51.5357°N 0.1575°W
- Website: www.zsl.org

The Zoological Society of London (ZSL) is a charitable organization devoted to the worldwide conservation of animals and their habitats.ZSL was founded in 1826. Since 1828, it has maintained London Zoo, and since 1931 Whipsnade Zoo.

== History ==
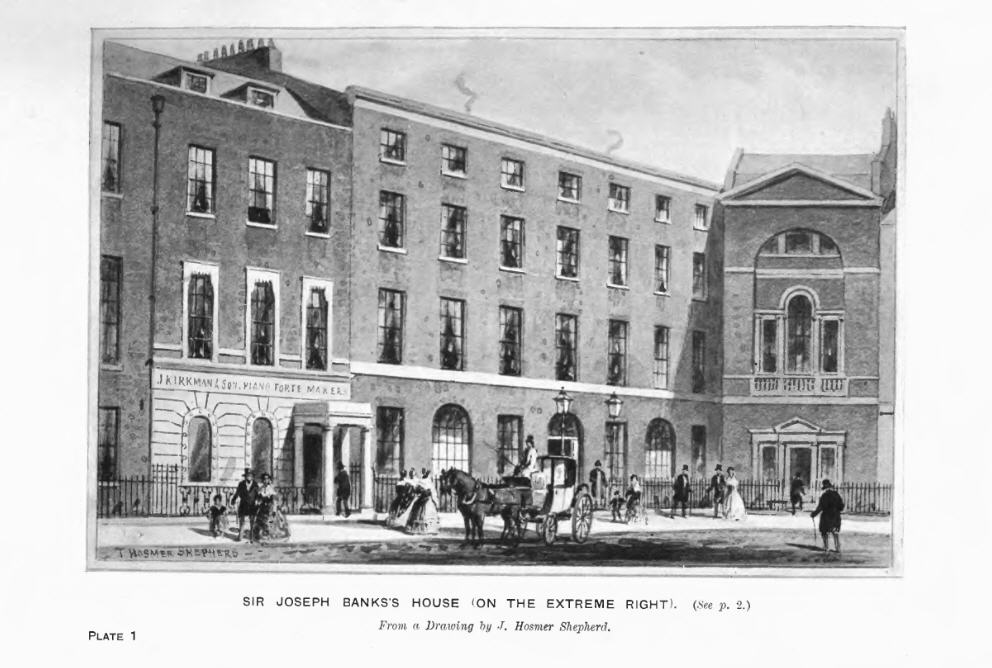
Sir Joseph Banks' house was the initial meeting place for the Zoological Society.

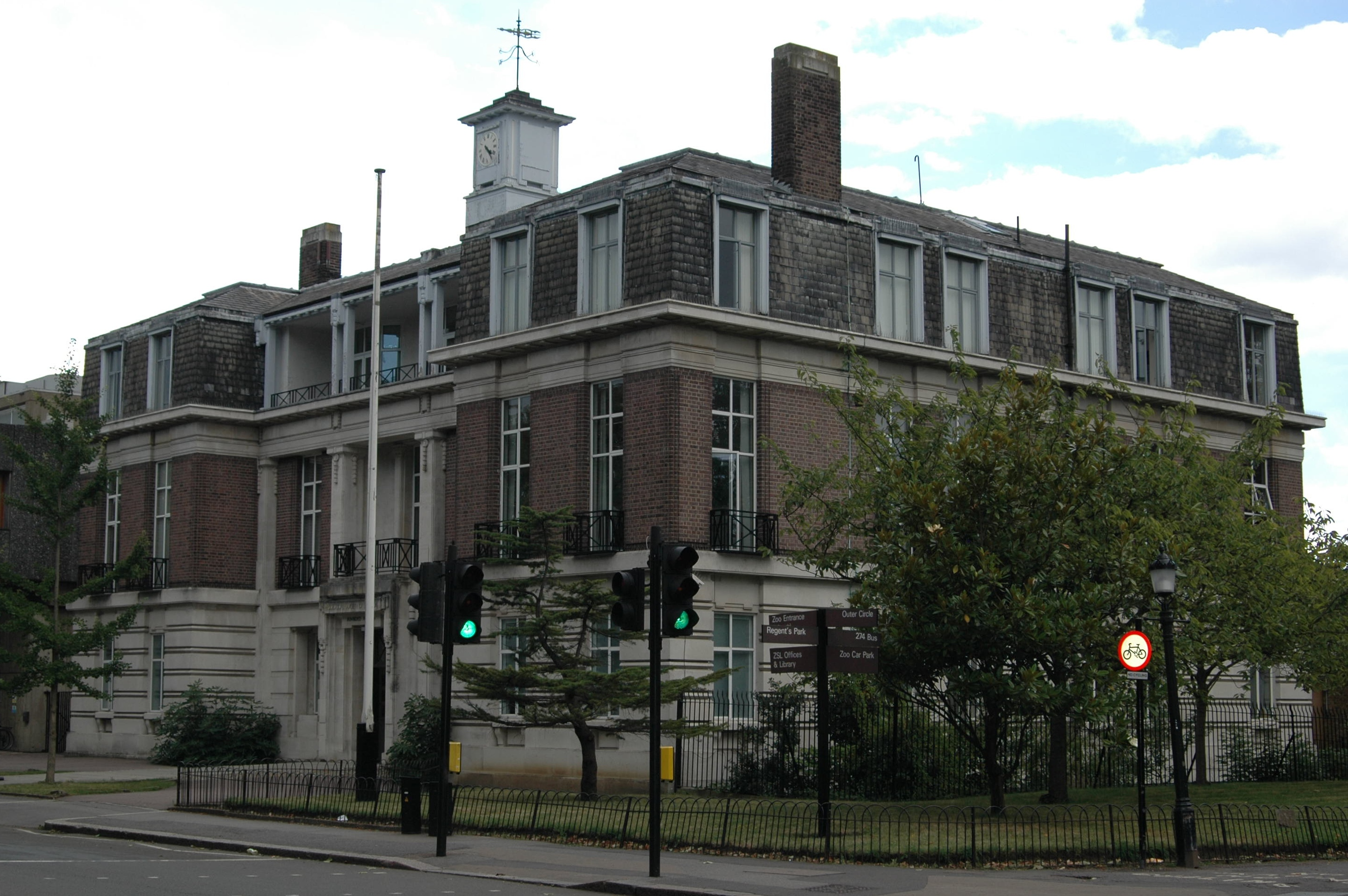
Zoological Society of London (ZSL), Main Building by John Belcher and John James Joass

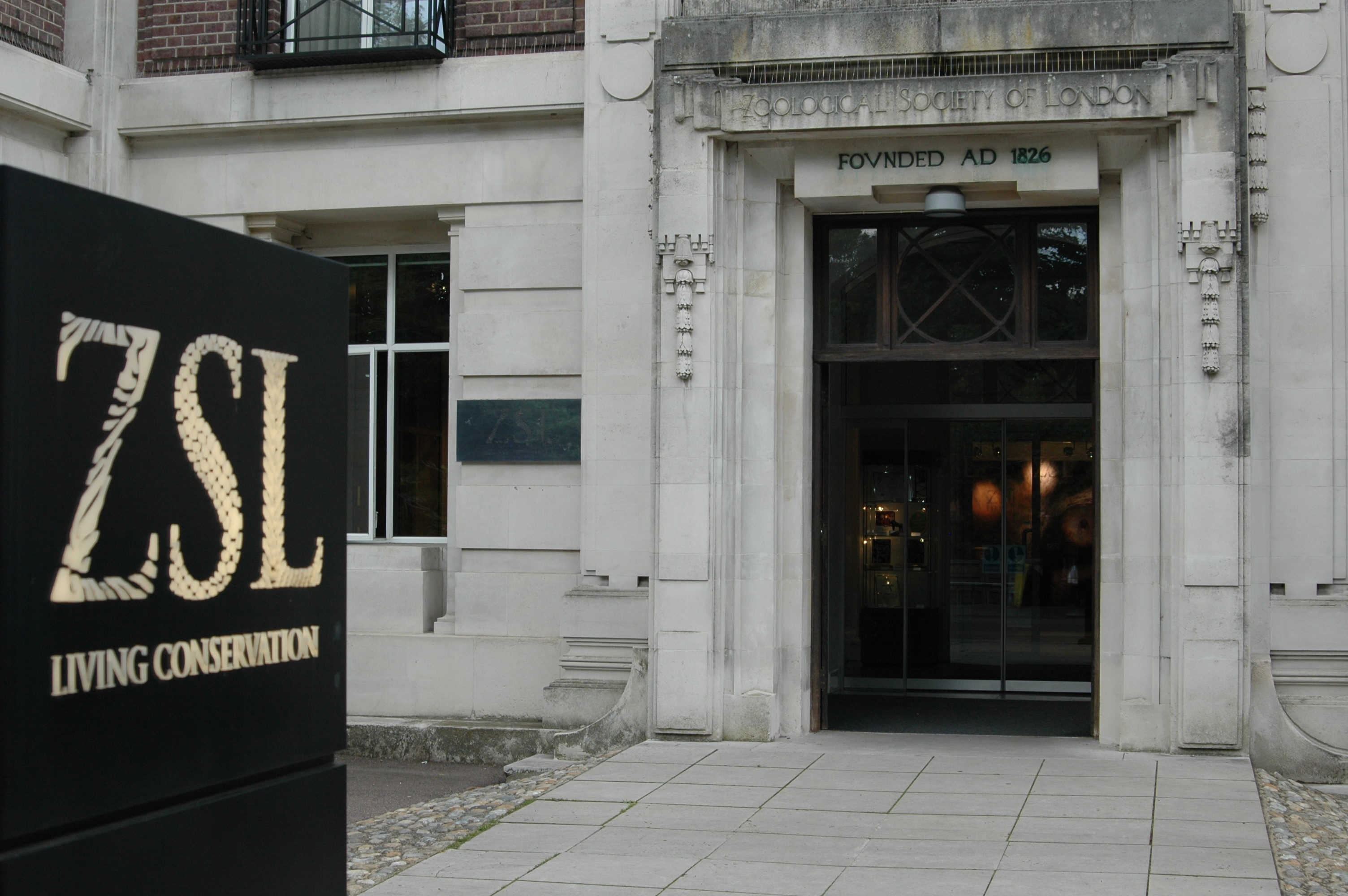
Zoological Society of London (ZSL), Main Building, Entrance

On 29 November 1822, the birthday of John Ray, "the father of modern zoology", a meeting held in the Linnean Society in Soho Square led by Rev. William Kirby, resolved to form a "Zoological Club of the Linnean Society of London". Between 1816 and 1826, discussions between Stamford Raffles, Humphry Davy, Joseph Banks and others led to the idea that London should have an establishment similar to the Jardin des Plantes in Paris. It would house a zoological collection "which should interest and amuse the public."

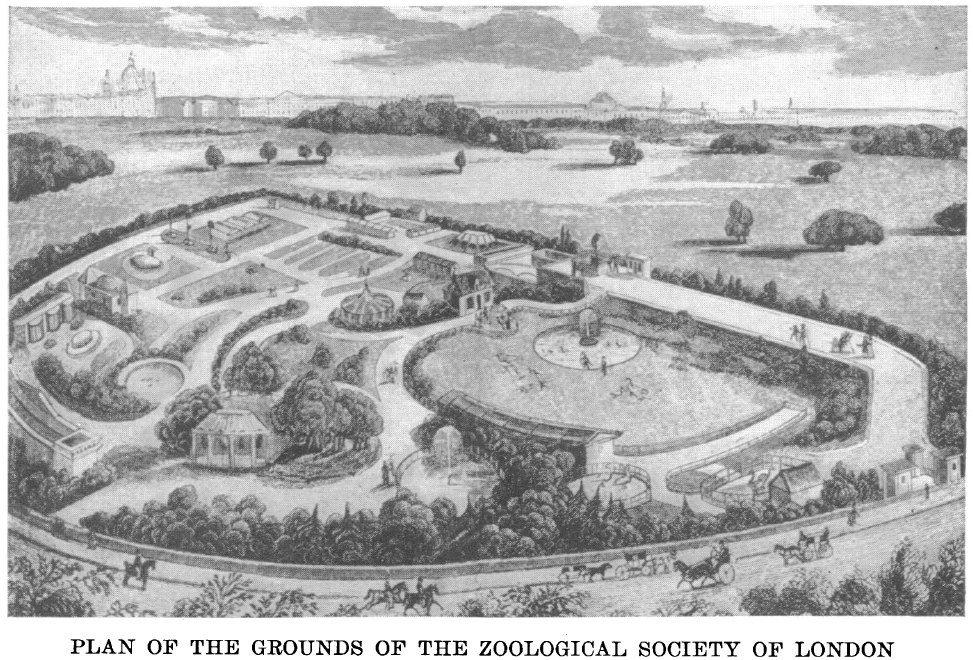
Plan of the Zoological Society of London (1829)

The society was founded in April 1826 by Sir Stamford Raffles, the Marquess of Lansdowne, Lord Auckland, Sir Humphry Davy, Robert Peel, Joseph Sabine, Nicholas Aylward Vigors along with various other nobility, clergy, and naturalists. Raffles was the first chairman and president, but died after only a few months in office, in July 1826. He was succeeded by the Marquess of Lansdowne who supervised the building of the first animal houses, a parcel of land in Regent's Park having already been obtained from the Crown at the inaugural meeting. It received a royal charter from George IV on 27 March 1829.

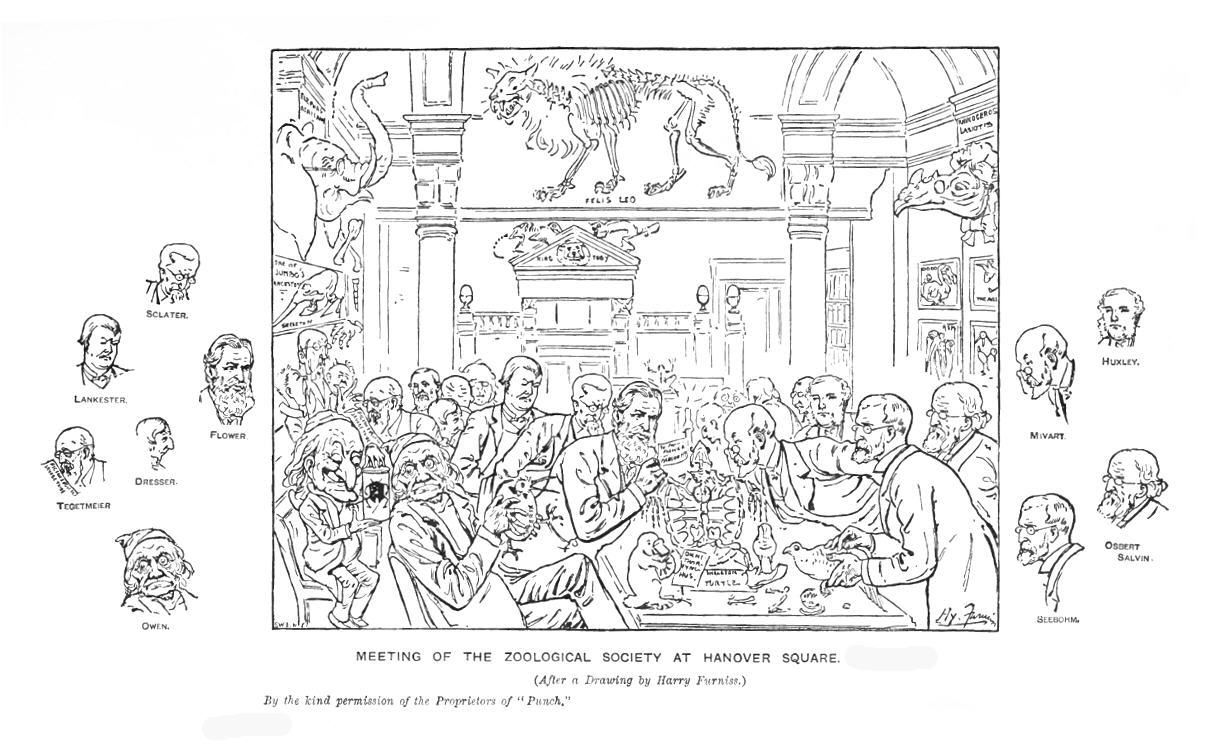
Punch illustration of a meeting of the zoologists

The purpose of the society was to create a collection of animals for study at leisure, an associated museum and library. In April 1828, the Zoological Gardens were opened to members. In 1831 William IV presented the Royal Menagerie to the Zoological Society, and in 1847 the public was admitted to aid funding, and Londoners soon christened the Zoological Gardens the "Zoo". London Zoo soon had the most extensive collection of animals in the world.

A History of the ZSL, written by Henry Scherren (FZS), was published in 1905. The History was criticised as inadequately researched by Peter Chalmers Mitchell in 1929; both histories were labelled inaccurate by John Bastin in 1970.

Former ZSL logo

As the twentieth century began, the need to maintain and research large animals in a more natural environment became clear. Peter Chalmers Mitchell (ZSL Secretary 1903–35) conceived the vision of a new park no more than 70 miles (110 km) away from London and thus accessible to the public, and at least 200 acres (0.81 km^{2}) in extent. In 1926, profiting from the agricultural depression, the ideal place was found: Hall Farm, near Whipsnade village, was derelict, and held almost 600 acres (2.4 km^{2}) on the Chiltern Hills. ZSL bought the farm in December 1926 for £13,480 12s 10d. In 1928 the first animals arrived at the new Whipsnade Park—two Amherst pheasants, a golden pheasant and five red jungle fowl. Others soon followed, including muntjac deer, llamas, wombats and skunks. In 1931 Whipsnade Park was opened to the public as the world's first open zoological park.

In 1960–61, Lord Zuckerman, then Secretary of ZSL, raised funds from two medical foundations to found laboratories as an Institute of Zoology where scientists would be employed by ZSL and undertake research.

The Society is a registered charity under English law.

=== Leases from the Crown Estate ===
Zoological Society of London (Leases) Act 2024 (Note: Section 2(3).)
- Act of Parliament
- Parliament of the United Kingdom
- Long title: An Act to amend the Crown Estate Act 1961 to increase the maximum term of the lease that may be granted to the Zoological Society of London in respect of land in Regent's Park.
- Citation: 2024 c. 20
- Territorial extent: England and Wales; Scotland; Northern Ireland; (Note: Section 2(1).)

Dates
- Royal assent: 24 May 2024
- Commencement: 24 July 2024 (Note: Section 2(2).)
Other legislation
Amends	Crown Estate Act 1961

Status: Current legislation

History of passage through Parliament

Text of statute as originally enacted

Under the Crown Estate Act 1961, the ZSL had a maximum lease length of 60 years from the Crown Estate, but this was changed to 150 years by the Zoological Society of London (Leases) Act 2024 (c. 20).

== The Institute of Zoology ==
The Institute of Zoology is the scientific research division of the ZSL. It is a government-funded research institute, which specialises in scientific issues relevant to the conservation of species and their habitats. The Institute of Zoology focuses its research on five areas:

- Biology and recovery of small populations
- Co-existence between wildlife and people
- Global biodiversity monitoring
- Mitigating the impacts of climate change on biodiversity
- Wildlife health.

The Institute of Zoology was graded 4 in the 1997–2001 UK Research Assessment Exercise, and publishes reports annually. From the late 1980s the Institute of Zoology had been affiliated to the University of London. In 2000 this was replaced with a partnership with the University of Cambridge, but in 2011, the institute became affiliated with University College London.

== Zoos and publications ==
ZSL runs London Zoo, Whipsnade Zoo and had planned to open an aquarium, Biota!. The society published the Zoological Record (ZR) from 1864 to 1980, when the ZR was transferred to BIOSIS. The Society has published the Proceedings of the Zoological Society of London, now called the Journal of Zoology, since 1830. Since 1998 it has also published Animal Conservation. Other publications include the International Zoo Yearbook and Remote Sensing in Ecology and Conservation.

== Awards ==
The society administers the following award programmes:

- Frink Medal
- Stamford Raffles Award
- Silver Medal
- ZSL Scientific Medal
- Marsh Award for Conservation Biology
- Marsh Award for Marine and Freshwater Conservation
- Thomson Reuters/Zoological Record Award for Communicating Zoology
- Prince Philip Award and Marsh Prize
- Charles Darwin Award and Marsh Prize
- Thomas Henry Huxley Award and Marsh Prize
- the Landseer Medal

== Fellows ==
Individuals can be elected Fellows of the Zoological Society of London and therefore granted the post-nominal letters FZS.

== Honorary fellows ==
Living Honorary ZSL Fellows (Hon. FZS) comprise:

- 1988: Milton Thiago de Mello
- 1991: Emperor Akihito of Japan
- 1998: Sir David Attenborough
- 2003: Professor Sir Brian Follett FRS, DL
- 2004: Sir Martin Holdgate
- 2005: Sir John Krebs; Katherine Ralls; Sir Brian Heap
- 2006: Sir John Lawton
- 2007: Sir John Beddington
- 2010: Robert Edward Fiennes-Clinton
- 2012: Desmond Morris
- 2013: Kenneth Sims
- 2019: Swraj Paul, Baron Paul
- 2020: Albert II, Prince of Monaco
- 2021: Michael Brambell; Jim Cuthbert Smith (President ZSL)

== Council ==
The council is the governing body of the ZSL. There are 15 council members, led by the president and served by the secretary and treasurer. Council members are the trustees of the society and serve for up to five years at a time.

== Presidents ==
The Presidency is a voluntary position, with the role of leading the ZSL Council. The society's presidents and their dates in office are:

- Sir Stamford Raffles (1826)
- Henry Petty-Fitzmaurice, 3rd Marquess of Lansdowne (1827–1831)
- Edward Smith-Stanley, 13th Earl of Derby (1831–1851)
- Albert, Prince Consort (1851–1862)
- Sir George Clerk, 6th Baronet (1862–1868)
- Arthur Hay, 9th Marquess of Tweeddale (1868–1878)
- William H. Flower (1879–1899)
- Herbrand Russell, 11th Duke of Bedford (1899–1936)
- Richard Onslow, 5th Earl of Onslow (1936–1942)
- Henry Gascoyne Maurice (1942–1948)
- Edward Cavendish, 10th Duke of Devonshire (1948–1950)
- Alan Brooke, 1st Viscount Alanbrooke (1950–1954)
- Landsborough Thomson (1954–1960)
- Prince Philip, Duke of Edinburgh (1960–1977)
- Solly Zuckerman, Baron Zuckerman (1977–1984)
- Sir William MacGregor Henderson FRS (1984–1989)
- Avrion Mitchison (1989–1992)
- John Chapple (1992–1994)
- Martin Holdgate (1994–2004)
- Patrick Bateson (2004–2014)
- John Beddington (2014–2022)
- Jim Cuthbert Smith (2022–present)

== Secretaries ==
The post of secretary is honorary and under the society's constitution carries the responsibility for the day-to-day management of the affairs of the ZSL. The secretaries and their dates in office are:

- Nicholas Aylward Vigors (1826–1833)
- Edward Turner Bennett (1833–1836)
- William Yarrell (1836–1838)
- John Barlow (1838–1840)
- William Ogilby (1840–1847)
- David William Mitchell (1847–1859)
- Philip Lutley Sclater (1859–1902)
- William Lutley Sclater (1903)
- Sir Peter Chalmers Mitchell (1903–1935)
- Sir Julian Huxley (1935–1942)
- Sheffield Airey Neave (1942–1952)
- The 3rd Viscount Chaplin (1952–1955)
- The Lord Zuckerman (1955–1977)
- Ronald Henderson Hedley (1977–1980)
- Erasmus Darwin Barlow (1980–1982)
- John Guest Phillips (1982–1984)
- Richard M. Laws (1984–1988)
- Sir Barry Cross (1988–1992)
- McNeill Alexander (1992–1999)
- Paul H. Harvey (2000–2011)
- Geoffrey Boxshall (2011–2021)
- Sir Jim Smith (2021–2022)

== Coat of arms ==
Coat of arms of Zoological Society of London
Notes Granted 10 February 1959 Crest On a wreath Or and Sable, an osprey, wings extended, perched upon and grasping in talons a fish fesswise Proper. Escutcheon Gules, a lion passant guardant Or, armed and langued Azure, holding in the dexter paw a torch Or, enflamed Proper, the flame irradiated also Or. Supporters On either side a zebra Proper, collared Or.
