= List of recipients of the W. S. Bruce Medal =

This is a list of recipients of the W. S. Bruce Medal.

Established in 1923, the medal is awarded quinquennially for notable contributions to "Zoology, Botany, Geology, Meteorology, Oceanography or Geography, where new knowledge has been gained through a personal visit to polar regions." and is open to researchers of all nationalities, preferably of Scottish birth or origin, and preferably at the outset of their careers. It commemorates the work of Dr William Spiers Bruce, an explorer and scientific investigator in polar regions.

The award is made and administered by the Royal Scottish Geographical Society in conjunction with the Royal Society of Edinburgh and the Royal Physical Society of Edinburgh.

== Recipients ==
Source: Royal Scottish Geographical Society

- 1926 – James Mann Wordie
- 1928 – Harald Ulrik Sverdrup
- 1930 – Neil Alison Mackintosh
- 1932 – Henry George "Gino" Watkins
- 1936 – James William Slessor Marr
- 1938 – Alexander Richard Glen
- 1940 – Brian Birley Roberts
- 1942 – Dr George Colin Lawder Bertram
- 1944 – Lieutenant Thomas Henry Manning
- 1946 – Lt-Col Patrick Douglas Baird
- 1948 – Dr William Alexander Deer
- 1950 – Dr Maxwell John Dunbar
- 1952 – Gordon de Quetteville Robin
- 1954 – Dr Richard Maitland Laws
- 1956 – J W Cowie
- 1958 – Dr Hal Lister
- 1960 – J MacDowall
- 1962 – Ken V Blaiklock
- 1964 – Dr Martin Wyatt Holdgate
- 1966 – Dr S Evans
- 1968 – Dr William Stanley Bryce Paterson
- 1972 – Dr P Friend
- 1977 – Dr Peter Wadhams
- 1980 – Dr A Clarke
- 1987 – Dr J E Gordon
- 1994 – Dr Ian Lamont Boyd
- 1999 – Professor D Marchant
- 2004 – Dr Michael J Bentley
- 2010 – Alison Cook
- 2016 – Andy Hein
- 2019 – Professor Julian Dowdeswell
- 2020 – Professor Peter Nienow

== See also ==
- List of general science and technology awards
- List of awards named after people
- William Speirs Bruce
