= Mortimore =

Mortimore may refer to:

- Jim Mortimore, British science fiction writer
- John Mortimore (cricketer) (1933–2014), English cricketer
- John Mortimore (footballer) (1934–2021), English association football player and manager
- Malcolm Mortimore (born 1953), drummer who has played with Gentle Giant, Spike Heatley, Tom Jones and many other artists
- Michael Mortimore (1937–2017), British geographer and a prolific researcher of issues in the African drylands
- Nathan Mortimore Newmark (1910–1981), American structural engineer and academic

== See also ==
- Mortimer
