= Christopher Robinson =

Chris or Christopher Robinson may refer to:

== Entertainment ==
- Christopher Robinson (musician) (born 1936), former Director of the Music, Choir of St John's College, Cambridge
- Chris Robinson (American actor) (1938–2025), soap opera actor
- Chris Robinson (Canadian actor), Canadian actor and comedian
- Chris Robinson (radio personality) (born 1956), Canadian travel writer and radio broadcaster
- Chris Robinson (writer) (born 1967), Canadian writer, animation historian and director of the Ottawa International Animation Festival
- Chris Robinson (singer) (born 1966), American rock singer for the Black Crowes
- Chris Robinson (director) (born 1967), music video director

== Government ==
- Sir Christopher Robinson (English judge) (1766–1833), admiralty lawyer, legal writer and MP
- Christopher Robinson (Upper Canada politician) (1763–1798), soldier, lawyer and political figure in Upper Canada
- Christopher Robinson (Rhode Island politician) (1806–1889), U.S. Representative and Minister to Peru
- Christopher Robinson (Virginia politician) (1645–1693), planter and politician in the colony of Virginia
- Christopher Robinson (burgess) (1681–1727), his son, Virginia-born planter and politician
- Christopher Robinson (Irish judge) (1712–1787), Irish lawyer, judge and bibliophile
- Christopher T. Robinson, American diplomat

== Other ==
- Christopher Robinson (priest) (died 1598), English Catholic priest and martyr, beatified in 1987
- Christopher Robinson (bishop) (1903–1988), Anglican bishop in India
- Christopher Robinson (Canadian lawyer) (1828–1905), Canadian lawyer and prosecutor

== Sports ==
- Chris Robinson (baseball) (born 1984), professional baseball player
- Chris Robinson (basketball) (born 1974), basketball player
- Chris Robinson (hurdler) (born 2001), American athlete
