= Alan R. Katritzky =

American chemist

Alan Katritzky
- Alan Roy Katritzky FRS
- Born: Alan Roy Katritzky; 18 August 1928; Harringay
- Died: 10 February 2014 (aged 85)
- Education: St Catherine's College, Oxford; Trinity Hall, Cambridge
- Spouse: Agnes Juliane Dietlinde Kilian (Linde)
- Scientific career
- Workplaces: University of Oxford; University of Cambridge; University of East Anglia; University of Florida
- Doctoral advisor: Sir Robert Robinson
- Website: www.ark.chem.ufl.edu

Alan Roy Katritzky FRS (18 August 1928 – 10 February 2014) was a British-born American chemist, latterly working at the University of Florida. He was a heterocyclic chemistry pioneer, who played a leading role in the subject’s elucidation and development.

== Early life and education ==
Alan Roy Katritzky was born in Harringay on 18 August 1928, son of Frederick Charles Katritzky, a tailor, and Emily Catherine (née Lane). In 1940 he was evacuated with other children from his secondary school (Hornsey County Grammar School) to Wisbech in Cambridgeshire, and it was there that "his passion for chemistry was inspired by the chemistry master, W. E. Fieldhouse". Having returned to Harringay, he set up his own laboratory at home and on his fifteenth birthday he prepared his first heterocyclic compound, the barbiturate drug Veronal. After 18 months of National Service, he entered St Catherine's College, Oxford in 1948. He obtained a first-class honours degree, and went on to study for a DPhil, which he gained in 1954. Katritzky’s research was on the structure of strychnine, supervised by Sir Robert Robinson.

== Career ==
Katritzky stayed on at Oxford as an independent researcher, from 1954 to 1958, directing a small group at the Dyson Perrins Laboratory; his main interest was in pyridines. He moved to Cambridge in 1958, initially to Trinity Hall, before becoming a founding fellow of Churchill College. During his time in Cambridge, he continued his research on pyridines as well as branching out into other areas. One such – NMR – particularly caught his interest, as it gave new insights into structure while leaving the sample intact. In 1963 Cambridge University honored him with the award of a DSc degree.

At the age of 34 Alan Katritzky was appointed professor of chemistry and head of a new school of physical sciences at UEA. Facing considerable opposition he argued that he should be head of a school of chemical sciences. He was supported by Alexander Todd, Robinson and Cockcroft, and won the day. Much effort was expended in preparing undergraduate courses, designing and building new laboratories, and recruiting some 25 faculty members, in addition to carrying out his research in heterocyclic chemistry. During this period his research elucidated understandings of aromaticity, structure and mechanisms of electrophilic substitution. In 1967 together with Gurnos Jones and Charles Rees, he played a leading role in the creation of the Heterocyclic Group of the Chemical Society. He was elected a Fellow of the Royal Society (FRS) in 1980. Overall, Katritzky’s stay at UEA was “immensely productive”.

By 1980, the administrative load in the job was becoming too much, and he realised that if he stayed in the UK retirement was on the horizon. So, in that year, Katritzky accepted the Kenan Chair of Chemistry at the University of Florida, which was a research professorship, with no requirement to provide lectures to undergraduates. It proved to be another very productive phase of Katritzky’s career, during which he established the Florida Center for Heterocyclic Compounds, developed and made available a computer program (Codessa Pro: COmprehensive DEscriptors for Structural and Statistical Analysis) and extensively researched the versatility of benzotriazoles in the synthesis of biologically interesting compounds. During his career, he supervised more than "300 graduate students and he worked with over 500 visiting faculty and postdoctoral fellows". He has been described as "forceful, direct and resolute in his professional life, but compassionate and warm in personal relationships."

For many years, Katritzky conducted annual worldwide lecture tours and over the course of his career "he served as a consultant to 32 companies throughout Europe and North America". When required, he was able to lecture and answer questions in German, French and Italian. Many of his lecture tours were organized through the British Council, national academies of science and chemical societies. Two of the companies for which he did consultancy were 3M and Pfizer. His consultancy for 3M continued for a long time, with visits to their headquarters at St Paul, Minnesota, their Harlow laboratories, and their subsidiary Ferrania in Savona, Italy.

== Publications ==
“During 60 years of research, Professor Katritzky's output was prodigious with over 2170 papers in the primary scientific literature plus authorship or editorship of more than 200 books. In the 1960s, Katritzky collaborated with Jeanne Lagowski to write two seminal textbooks: Heterocyclic Chemistry 1960 and Principles of Heterocyclic Chemistry 1967. The second book was translated into seven languages. In 1962 and 1965 respectively, he took on the editorship of two organic chemistry journals: Advances in Heterocyclic Chemistry and Tetrahedron Letters (UK editor). He relinquished the latter when he moved to the US in 1980, but in the same year he started as US editor for Tetrahedron and continued in this role until 1998. He and Charles Rees were jointly editors-in-chief of the eight volume Comprehensive Heterocyclic Chemistry, which was published in 1984. Katritzky also participated as an editor-in-chief of updates of this work, which were published in 1996 (eleven volumes) and 2008 (fifteen volumes).

In 2000, Katritzky founded Arkivoc, an open access journal which is free to both readers and authors. He and his wife Linde made a charitable donation to start Arkivoc, hoping that the journal would particularly help authors and readers in developing countries. In the same year, Katritzky started annual Florida Heterocyclic & Synthetic Chemistry (FloHet) conferences, anticipating that they could provide revenue to support the journal.

== Honors and awards ==
"His work was recognized throughout the world by 33 honorary doctorates or professorships and awards.” Amongst the latter were:

- Tilden Medal of the Royal Society of Chemistry (1975)
- Fellow of the Royal Society, England (1980)
- Fellow of the American Association for the Advancement of Science (2000)
- Cope Senior Scholar Award of the American Chemical Society (2002)
- Robert Robinson Lectureship (2009)

== Family ==
Alan Katritzky met Agnes Juliane Dietlinde Kilian (Linde) while skiing in Germany in 1949. They married in Munich on 5 August 1952. They had four children: Margaret, Erika, Rupert, and Freda.
