= Mary Tiffen =

British economic historian, scholar, and development professional (1931–2020)

Mary Tiffen (née Steele-Perkins; 16 July 1931 – 23 April 2020) was a British economic historian, scholar and development professional. She specialised in ancient irrigation systems and African drylands.

== Background ==
Tiffen was the daughter of Gwendolen (nee Carrall) and Horace Steele-Perkins, raised in Farnborough, Hampshire. Her father was an RAF officer and worked during WWII in Hong Kong. After WWII, Mary moved to India, and finished her schooling in Devon, and took a history degree at Girton College, Cambridge (1952). She then taught and worked for NGOs, from 1960 accompanying her husband on overseas missions and conducting independent research. Her Doctor of Philosophy (PhD) was from the London School of Economics (1974).

From 1983 to 1994, she worked at the Overseas Development Institute in London. She then set up a policy consultancy with Michael Mortimore, Dryland Research, which ran until the 2000s.

== Contributions ==
She carried out fieldwork in Africa and the Middle East; including in Nigeria, Malawi, Kenya, Senegal, Niger, and Iraq (on irrigation). Her PhD work was in Gombe Emirate, North Eastern State, Nigeria and concerned the economics of peasant livelihoods. She was struck by the innovative success of livelihoods under harsh conditions, and developed an interest in enhancements to market systems.

She is best known for a revisionist account of livelihoods in Machakos, Kenya entitled More People, Less Erosion (with Michael Mortimore and F. Gichuki, 1994). From 1991, she and Mortimore embarked on a major project with Francis Gichuki, in the Machakos Hills. This region was long held to have suffered serious erosion accompanied by population growth. The researchers – after securing funding from a variety of sources – set about testing population-environment models and relationships, discovering something unexpected. Landscapes and livelihoods had been enhanced while population density grew. Leaning on (and improving on) Ester Boserup's work, they discovered environmental enhancement occurred through multicropping and other farming methods, terracing, and strong community organisations. Mortimore and Tiffen's comparisons of photographs from 1930 and 1990 showed these trends: an improvement in landscapes and in resource management (rather than degradation and impoverishment), albeit with much higher population densities and altered labour regimes.

This finding 'controverted' Malthusian thinking. The 1993 launch of More People, Less Erosion at the ODI in London was electric – several staff members of the UK Department for International Development, the World Bank, and academic researchers from East Africa were there, and the study has echoed through revisionist thinking about African degradation myths and agrarian policy ever since. It remains a controversial and talked-about thesis on African development paths. It has been cited over 2300 times.

== Personal life ==
In 1960, she married Brian Tiffen, who worked for the British Council (d. 2014). He worked in Nigeria, Malawi, Iraq and elsewhere and she developed research in these countries. She had two children, Martin and Jenny, and five grandchildren.

Tiffen died at the age of 88, from Covid-19.

== Selected works ==
- Tiffen, Mary (1976). The Enterprising Peasant: Economic Development in Gombe Emirate, North Eastern State, Nigeria, 1900-1968. London: H.M. Stationery Office.
- Tiffen, Mary; Mortimore, Michael (1990). Theory and practice in plantation agriculture: An economic review. London: Overseas Development Institute.
- Tiffen, M, Mortimore MJ. and F Gichuki. 1994. More people, less erosion. Environmental recovery in Kenya. Chichester: John Wiley.
- Tiffen, Mary; Mortimore, Michael (1994). "Malthus controverted: The role of capital and technology in growth and environment recovery in Kenya". World Development. 22 (7): 997–1010. doi:10.1016/0305-750X(94)90144-9.
- English, John; Tiffen, Mary; Mortimore, Michael (1994). Land Resource Management in Machakos District, Kenya, 1930-1990. World Bank.
- Tiffen, Mary (2003). "Transition in sub-Saharan Africa: agriculture, urbanization and income growth". World Development. 31 (8): 1343–1366. doi:10.1016/S0305-750X(03)00088-3.
- Tiffen, M. 2012. Friends of Sir Robert Hart: Three Generations of Carrall Women in China. Self-published.
- Tiffen, M. 2017. Testimony to Love. Self-published.
