= Bhaskar Vira =

British-Indian economist and geographer

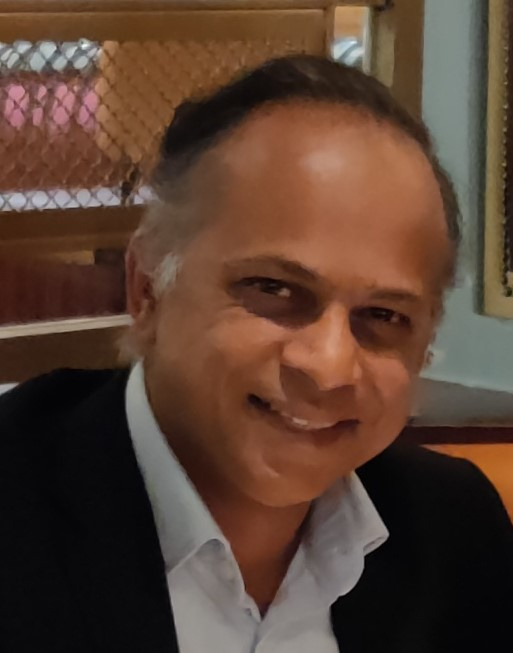
- Born: 21 July 1967 (age 59); New Delhi, India
- Education: The Doon School; St. Stephen's College, Delhi; St. John's College, Cambridge
- Spouse: Shiraz Vira (m. 1991)
- Awards: Busk Medal, Royal Geographical Society (2018); Fellow, Academy of Social Sciences (2021)
- Scientific career
- Fields: Political economy, political ecology, development studies, human geography, environmental conservation
- Workplaces: St. John's College, Cambridge; Mansfield College, Oxford; Fitzwilliam College, Cambridge

Bhaskar Vira is an Indian academic, professor of Political Economy, and the current Pro Vice Chancellor for Education for Cambridge University. From 2019 until 2022, he was Head of Department of Geography, University of Cambridge. He was the founding director of the University of Cambridge Conservation Research Institute, and is a fellow of Fitzwilliam College, Cambridge. In 2018, he was awarded the Busk Medal by the Royal Geographical Society for his contributions in the fields of environment, development and economy. In 2021, he was elected to a Fellowship of the Academy of Social Sciences for his contributions to social science.

== Biography ==
Vira was born in New Delhi, India and was educated at The Doon School in Dehradun. After Doon, he went to St. Stephen's College, Delhi for a bachelor's degree in economics and then got a second BA from St. John's College, Cambridge. He then stayed in Cambridge to pursue an MPhil and a PhD in economics and political economy respectively.

== Career ==
While working on his doctorate, Vira lectured at St. John's College, Cambridge in 1993–94. After receiving his doctorate in 1994, Vira became a Research Fellow at the Oxford Centre for Environment, Ethics and Society in Mansfield College, University of Oxford, and remained there till 1997. He then joined the Department of Geography at the University of Cambridge and became a fellow and graduate tutor at Fitzwilliam College, Cambridge. In 2013, he became the founding director of the University of Cambridge Conservation Research Institute. He was appointed Head of Department of Geography, University of Cambridge in October 2019. He regularly writes for various newspapers and magazines, including The Guardian, The Independent, Quartz, and The Wire. He was awarded the Busk Medal by Royal Geographical Society in 2018, for his interdisciplinary contributions in the fields of environment, development and economy. In 2021, he was elected to a Fellowship of the Academy of Social Sciences for his contributions to social science. Environmental issues in the Himalayas feature among Vira's varied research interests. Vira also sits on the advisory board of the G12++ certificate, a high school-equivalent certificate tailor-made for refugees by Alsama Project.

== Selected publications ==
- Vira, Bhaskar (1995). Rights, Property Rights, and their Protection: Implications for the Analysis of Environmental Policy. Oxford Centre for the Environment, Ethics & Society. ISBN 978-1900316019.
- Vira, Bhaskar, ed. (2001). Conflict and Cooperation in Participating Natural Resource Management. Palgrave Macmillan UK. ISBN 978-0-230-59661-0.
- Vira, Bhaskar; Jeffery, Roger, eds. (2001). Analytical Issues in Participatory Natural Resources. Palgrave Macmillan UK. ISBN 978-0333792766.
- Vira, Bhaskar; Wildburger, Christoph; Mansourian, Stephanies, eds. (2015). Forests and Food: Addressing Hunger and Nutrition Across Sustainable Landscapes. Open Book. ISBN 978-1783741946.
