= Ron Martin (geographer) =

Ronald Leonard Martin FBA FAcSS (born 17 April 1948) is professor of economic geography at the Department of Geography University of Cambridge. He is a fellow of the Cambridge-MIT Institute, research associate of the Centre for Business Research and professorial fellow of St Catharine's College, Cambridge.

Martin's research focuses on the geographies of work and of financial systems, regional economic development, economic theory and economic geography, and the interface between geography and public policy. He is the editor of the journal Cambridge Journal of Regions, Economy and Society, published by Oxford University Press. He was elected a Fellow of the British Academy in 2005, and awarded a Leverhulme Trust Major Research Fellowship for 2007–2010.

Outside of his academic work, he is an associate director of the Local Futures Group, an economic-geographic consultancy.

== Awards and recognition ==
- British Academy's 'Thank-Offering to Britain' senior research fellowship, 1997–1998
- Academician of the Academy of Learned Societies for the Social Sciences, 2001
- Listed by the American Economic Association in 2003 as one of the world's most cited economists
