= Busk Medal =

Award of the Royal Geog. Soc. (UK)

The Busk Medal is an award given annually by the Royal Geographical Society, for "conservation research or for fieldwork abroad in geography or in a geographical aspect of an allied science". It was first awarded in 1975, and is named in honour of Sir Douglas Laird Busk, a former diplomat, mountaineer, and honorary vice-president of the Society. Busk worked as a diplomat in Iran, Hungary, South Africa, Japan, Turkey and Iraq before serving as Ambassador to Ethiopia, Finland and Venezuela.

== Winners ==
Busk Medal winners
Year	Winner
1975	Professor Nicholas N. Ambraseys
1976	Dr Arthur H. B. Stride
1977	Professor André Guilcher
1978	Dr William O. Field
1979	Professor Karl Butzer
1980	Dr Marjorie Sweeting
1981	Professor Hans Bobek
1982	Alfred Thomas Grove
1983	Professor Luna Leopold
1984	Dr Jevan Pierres Berrangé
1985	Professor Jean Tricart
1986	Commander Chris Furse
1987	Professor Alice Coleman
1988	Dr Malcolm Coe
1989	Ralph Daly
1990	Max Nicholson
1991	Dr John Proctor
1992	Dr Robin Pellew
1993	Dr John Sheail
1994	Dr Bernard Tinker
1995	Dr Rita Gardner
1996	Professor Alexey Yablokov
1997	Professor Grenville Lucas
1998	Dr David Collins
1999	Michael Mortimore
2000	Dr Mark Collins
2001	Professor David Bellamy
2002	Professor Edward O. Wilson
2003	Professor David Warrell
2004	Dr Bill Adams
2005	Dr Sampurno Bruijnzeel
2006	Dr Hugh Brammer
2007	Professor Geoffrey Petts
2008	Tamotsu Nakamura
2009	Professor Janet Hooke
2010	Professor Ann Varley
2011	Professor Lewis Owen
2012	Professor Claudio Vita-Finzi
2013	Professor Susan Page
2014	Professor Uma Kothari
2015	Dr Jayalaxshmi Mistry
2016	Professor Jo Sharp
2017	Professor David Evans
2018	Professor Bhaskar Vira
2019	Dr Ayona Datta
2020	Professor Nina Laurie
2021	Dr Emma Mawdsley
2022	Professor James D. Sidaway
2023	Professor Jos Barlow
2024	Leon McCarron
