= Emma Mawdsley =

Emma Mawdsley is a professor of geography at University of Cambridge and a Fellow of Newnham College, Cambridge. Since October 2024, she has been head of the Department of Geography at the University of Cambridge.

Mawdsley studied at Cambridge and then worked at Durham University and Birkbeck College before returning to Cambridge. Her research focus has been on global development, particularly in India. In May 2021, Mawdsley was awarded the Royal Geographical Society’s Busk Medal, “for exceptional engagements with fieldwork, research and knowledge production about the global South”.

== Awards ==
- Busk Medal, Royal Geographical Society 2021

== Selected publications ==
- Mawdsley, E., 2013. From Recipients to Donors: The Emerging Powers and the Changing Development Landscape, Zed, London.
- Mawdsley, E., Fourie, E. and Nauta, W. (eds.), 2019. Researching South–South Development Cooperation, Routledge.
