= Arkivoc =

- Discipline: Organic chemistry
- Language: English

Publication details
- History: 2000–present
- Publisher: Arkat USA
- Open access: Yes
- Impact factor: 1.253 (2018)

Standard abbreviations
- ISO 4: Arkivoc

Indexing
- CODEN: AKVCFI
- ISSN: 1551-7004 (print); 1551-7012 (web)
- LCCN: 2007216062
- OCLC no.: 443560056

Links
- Journal homepage; Online archive

Arkivoc (Archive for Organic Chemistry) is a peer-reviewed open access scientific journal covering all aspects of organic chemistry. It is published by the non-profit organization Arkat USA, which was established in 2000 through a personal donation from Alan R. Katritzky and Linde Katritzky. Arkivoc is the primary publication of Arkat USA. According to the Journal Citation Reports, the journal has a 2014 impact factor of 1.165, ranking it 37th out of 57 journals in the category "Chemistry, Organic".

== Abstracting and Indexing ==
According to the Journal Citation Reports, the journal has a 2018 impact factor of 1.253. The journal is indexed in Web of Science: Science Citation Index Expanded.
