= Richard Laws =

British Antarctic scientist (1926–2014)

Dick Laws CBE FRS ScD
- Born: Richard Maitland Laws; 23 April 1926; Whitley Bay
- Died: 7 October 2014 (aged 88)
- Education: University of Cambridge
- Awards: FRS (1980); Polar Medal (1975); CBE
- Scientific career
- Fields: Marine biology
- Workplaces: University of Cambridge; British Antarctic Survey; Institute of Oceanography

Richard Maitland Laws CBE FRS (23 April 1926 – 7 October 2014) was Director of the British Antarctic Survey from 1973 to 1987; Master of St Edmund's College, Cambridge, from 1985 to 1996 and Secretary of the Zoological Society of London.

== Education and early life ==
Laws was born in Whitley Bay, Northumberland and educated at Dame Allan's School, Newcastle upon Tyne and St Catharine's College, Cambridge, where he was an Open Scholar.

== Career ==
Laws started his career as a zoologist on the Falkland Islands Dependencies Survey in 1947, where he investigated the ecology of elephant seals in the South Orkney Islands and South Georgia. These formed the subject of his 1953 Cambridge PhD. After spending a season as a whaling inspector, he joined the national Institute of Oceanography (1955–61) where he studied great whales and elephant seals.

Outside Antarctica, he was also an expert on the large African mammals. In 1960, he was appointed Director of the Nuffield Unit of Tropical Animal Ecology in Uganda. Over the next eight years, his research focused on hippopotamus and elephant ecology. Laws spent a year as Director of the Tsavo Research Project in Kenya (1967–68). Needing data from 300 dead elephants, Laws' research at Tsavo involved the slaughter of 300 wild elephants, which were taken from one herd. He then asked for a similar number to be killed in each of the nine remaining Tsavo herds. Protests led by David Sheldrick resulted in the denial of this request and the subsequent winding up Laws' research.

Laws returned to Cambridge in 1968 to resume his Antarctic research. In 1969, he became Head of the Life Sciences Division of the British Antarctic Survey. He succeeded Vivian Fuchs as BAS Director in 1973, a post he held until retirement in May 1987.

He was Master of St Edmund's College, Cambridge, from 1985 until 1996. He was a member of the Scientific Committee of the International Whaling Commission.

== Awards and honours ==
In 1954, Laws won the Bruce memorial prize for his work on the ecology of elephant seals. He was awarded the Polar Medal in 1975.

Laws was elected a Fellow of the Royal Society (FRS) in 1980, and was appointed Commander of the Order of the British Empire (CBE) in 1983.

In 1991, he was awarded an Honorary Doctor of Science degree by the University of Bath. He was a member of the Norwegian Academy of Science and Letters from 1998.

=== Laws prize ===
On his retirement, a fund was established for a prize to be awarded in recognition of the achievements of outstanding young scientists of the Survey. The Laws Prize continues to be awarded annually, with the fund administered by the BAS Club.

Professional and academic associations
Preceded by John Guest Phillips	Secretary of the Zoological Society of London; 1984–1988	Succeeded by Barry Albert Cross
