= Remote Sensing in Ecology and Conservation =

- Discipline: Ecology, Remote sensing
- Language: English
- Edited by: Nathalie Pettorelli

Publication details
- History: 2015–present
- Publisher: John Wiley & Sons
- Frequency: Quarterly
- Open access: Yes
- Impact factor: 5.481 (2020)

Standard abbreviations
- ISO 4: Remote Sens. Ecol. Conserv.

Indexing
- ISSN: 2056-3485

Links
- Journal homepage

Remote Sensing in Ecology and Conservation is an academic journal published by John Wiley & Sons on behalf of the Zoological Society of London (ZSL) about ecology and remote sensing. According to the Journal Citation Reports, the journal has a 2020 impact factor of 5.481. It is edited by Nathalie Pettorelli (ZSL).
