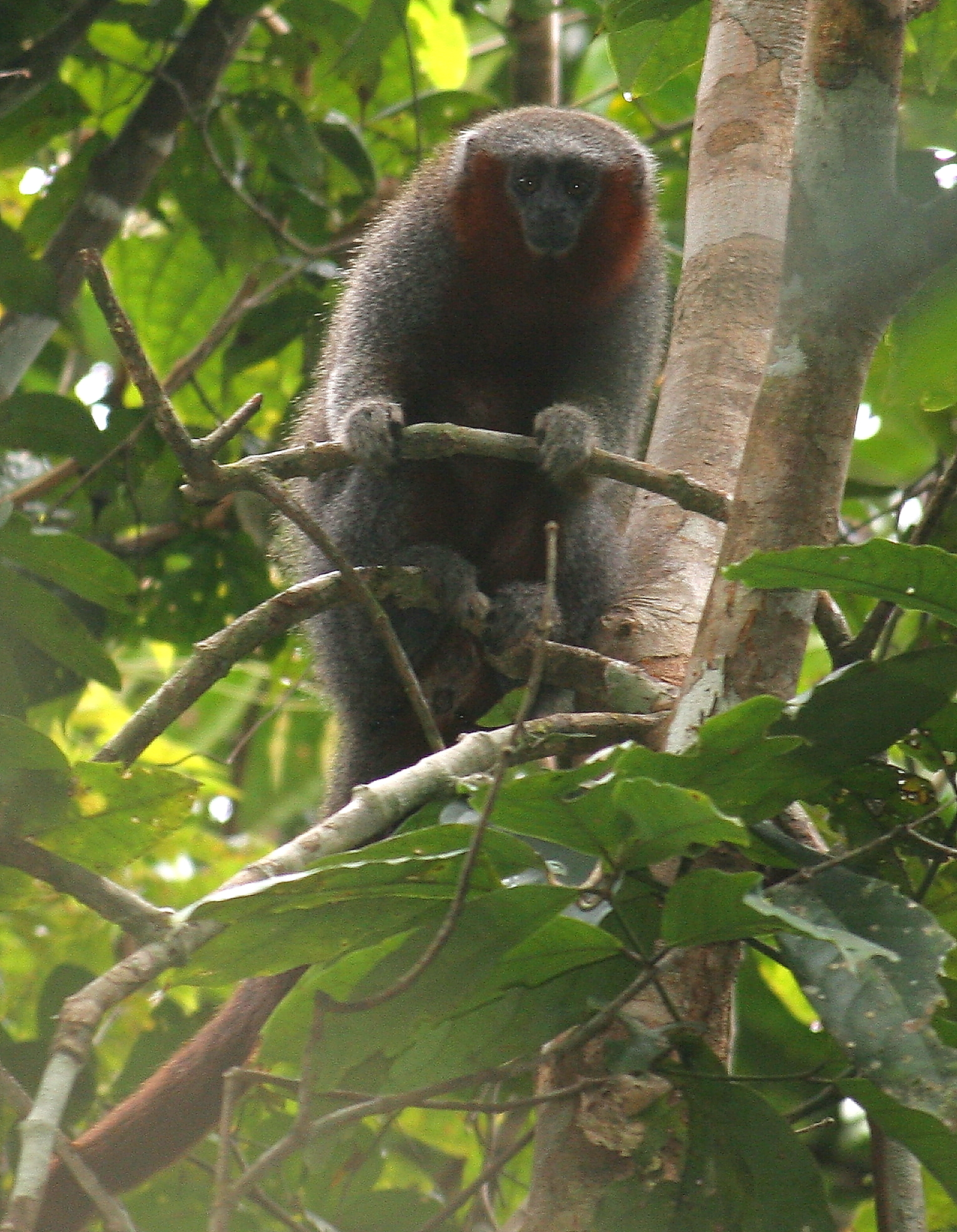

Conservation status
- Data Deficient (IUCN 3.1)

Scientific classification
- Kingdom: Animalia
- Phylum: Chordata
- Class: Mammalia
- Order: Primates
- Family: Pitheciidae
- Genus: Plecturocebus
- Species: P. miltoni

Binomial name
- Plecturocebus miltoni Dalponte, Silva, Silva Júnior, 2014

Synonyms
- Callicebus miltoni

= Milton's titi monkey =

Milton's titi

Species of New World monkey

Milton's titi monkey (Plecturocebus miltoni) is a species of titi monkey, a type of New World monkey, from southern Amazon rainforest, Brazil. It was named after the Brazilian primatologist Milton Thiago de Mello. Milton's titi was discovered in 2011 by Julio César Dalponte, and recognized as a new species in 2014.

== Appearance ==
Milton's titi has a light gray band on its forehead, dark ochre sideburns and throat, a dark grey torso and flanks, a uniformly orange tail, and a light ochre abdomen.

== Distribution and natural history ==
Plecturocebus miltoni was discovered in the state of Mato Grosso and the state of Amazonas, Brazil. The geographic distribution is centered around the Aripuanã River, Roosevelt River and Guariba River. The holotype of the species was retrieved along the right bank of the Roosevelt River, at the Guariba-Roosevelt Extractive Reserve (08°59'45.21"S 60°43'42.72" W). The habitat distribution is considered to be the interfluvial region between the Roosevelt and Aripuanã rivers. The southern limit of P. miltoni's distribution is marked by steep hills forming a terrestrial barrier. P. miltoni was not found along the left side of the Roosevelt river, and was instead replaced by Prince Bernhard's titi. Amazonian distributions of titi monkeys are limited by rivers, given that they cannot swim and forest habitat specificity. The Milton Titi therefore has a range limited to the area between the two rivers and southern hills and is endemic to that area.

P. miltoni was discovered in a mixed ombrophilous alluvial forest, describing a forest biome that is commonly referred to as a rainforest, and where often anthropogenic activities have caused a disruption in succession and increase in pioneer species. The biome is defined as high in precipitation with a strong presence of Araucaria pines. The climate is hot and humid in summers and cool in winters. Milton Titis are found in the high (canopy) and medium (undercanopy) strata of the ombrophilous forest. The forest canopy has a maximum height of 30m. Its habitat biome is also known to be more precisely referred to as terra firme (tropical moist), or Amazonian lowland forests. These are gentle hills that are elevated above flood level. The area is of significant biogeographic importance as it is a potential hotspot for endemism.

The geographic distribution of P. miltoni is approximated to be 4,921.540 ha by the researchers who discovered the species. A significant portion is this distribution is located within indigenous territory represented by the Terra Indigena Arara do Rio Branco

== Behavioral ecology and nutrition ==
It is common for titi monkeys to express territoriality and communication as a meta-population through vocalization. P. miltoni was observed to behave in the same way as other titi monkeys. Loud voice calls are more common in the morning and less frequent during the dry season. Like other titi monkeys, P. miltoni has vocal seasonality. Group communication was found to be related in some cases to fruit availability (which is during the rainy season) and territoriality.

Groups have been observed of up to five individuals. Groups are limited to a monogamous pair and their offspring, like other titi monkeys. When sleeping, family members often have their tails touching.

P. miltoni has been found to be diurnal, with intermittent naps in the daytime. Titis can easily jumps between trees and branches, as defined by their German name, Springaffen.

Their nutrition has been found to be mainly frugivorous, as with other species of titi monkeys. Their favorites seem to be Inga, cacao, and cecropia.

== Taxonomy and phylogeny ==
Milton titis are referred to as "fire-taired zogue zogue" locally. The designated holotype was first retrieved by a local hunter before being transferred to Dalponte.

Milton titis belong to the species group Plecturocebus Moloch. It was previously recognized as Callicebus miltoni, as it was named at its discovery. The titi monkey sub-family Callicebinae is the most species rich of primate taxons, and yet was previously considered as monogeneric under the genus Callicebus. Given the incredible diversity, three new genera were proposed in 2002: Callicebus (for eastern Brazilian titis), Cheracebus ("collared" titis) and Plecturocebus (titis of the Amazon and Chaco). The species-level diversification occurred during the Pleistocene as the Plecturocebus moloch group travelled across the Amazon. This was because of rivers that created reproductive barriers that caused a form of allopatric speciation, and could be a contribution into the great diversity of the sub-family Callicebinae (the titi monkey family).

== Conservation ==
The IUCN does not have enough data to evaluate risk for P. miltoni. The last assessment was in 2021. The researchers who discovered the species have mentioned that deforestation is the greatest threat to the species. The total area of deforested land in P. miltoni's habitat was 2.32 million hectares when the species was described, 4.7% of the total range of the species. Hunting does not appear to present a risk to the species.

Approximately 25% (1,246,382 ha) of the natural range of P. miltoni is located in protected areas. The species occurs, or may occur, in the following protected areas:

- Guariba-Roosevelt Extractivist Reserve
- Aripuanã Forest State Park
- Manicoré Forest State Park
- Aripuanã Reserva de Desenvolmento Sustentável
- Campos Amazonicos National Park
- Rio Flor do Prado Ecological Station
