= Barry Cross =

British biologist (1925–1994)

Sir Barry Albert Cross CBE FRS FZS (17 March 1925 – 27 April 1994) was a British biologist. He was a fellow of Corpus Christi College, Cambridge. He was appointed a Commander of the Order of the British Empire (CBE) in the 1981 Birthday Honours when he was Director of the Institute of Animal Physiology at the Agricultural Research Council, and knighted in 1989.

Professional and academic associations
Preceded by Richard M. Laws	Secretary of the Zoological Society of London; 1988–1992	Succeeded by R. McNeill Alexander
