= Robert McNeill Alexander =

British zoologist (1934–2016)

R. McNeill Alexander CBE FRS
- Demonstrating a biomechanics point with an Invicta Plastics dinosaur model
- Born: 7 July 1934; Lisburn
- Died: 21 March 2016
- Education: Trinity Hall, University of Cambridge, Tonbridge School
- Occupation: Zoologist
- Employer: University of Leeds

Robert McNeill (Neill) Alexander, CBE FRS (7 July 1934 – 21 March 2016) was a British zoologist and a leading authority in the field of biomechanics. For thirty years he was Professor of Zoology at the University of Leeds.

== Early life and education ==
Alexander was born in Lisburn, Northern Ireland, one of the four sons of Robert Alexander and his wife Janet McNeill. His father was the chief engineer of the city of Belfast. His mother was a novelist and playwright who wrote more than 20 children's books and two opera libretti. He was educated at Tonbridge School and at Trinity Hall, Cambridge where he gained an MA and a PhD. His PhD research at Cambridge was supervised by Professor Sir James Gray, FRS. Subsequently, he was awarded a DSc by the University of Wales.

== Academic career ==
Alexander was a Lecturer at the University College of North Wales (now Bangor University) from 1958 to 1969 and then Professor of Zoology at the University of Leeds from 1969 until his retirement in 1999, when the title of emeritus professor was conferred upon him.

Until 1970, he was mainly concerned with fish, investigating the mechanics of swim bladders, tails and fish jaw mechanisms. Subsequently, he concentrated on the mechanics of terrestrial locomotion, notably walking and running in mammals, particularly on gait selection and its relationship to anatomy and the structural design of skeletons and muscles.

Alexander was particularly interested in the mechanics of dinosaur locomotion. He developed a formula to calculate the speed of motion of dinosaurs, the so-called 'dinosaur speed calculator,' mathematically derived from the Froude number:

"The key to deriving estimates of dinosaur gait and speed from trackways was provided by the zoologist R. McNeill Alexander (1976). From observations of modern animals, he derived a general relationship between an animal's speed of locomotion (v) and its hip height (h) and its stride length (SL), which is

$${v}=0.25.{g^{0.5}}.{SL^{1.67}}.{h^{-1.17}}$$

Alexander also pointed out that this formula could be applied to dinosaur trackways since the stride length can be measured directly and the hip height could be estimated from the size of the foot print."

Originally, Alexander stated: "I have now obtained a relationship between speed, stride length and body size from observations of living animals and applied this to dinosaurs to achieve estimates of their speeds. The estimated speeds are rather low—between 1.0 and 3.6 ms^{−1}."

Modifications to the original formula gave rise to revised estimates, and "Alexander (1996) argued that based on the bone dimensions of Tyrannosaurus it is unlikely they could have travelled at more than 8ms^{−1}." Several calculations using variants of the formula indicate that dinosaurs probably travelled at around 3 ms^{−1} with a top speed of 8 ms^{−1}. This translates to a speed range of roughly 6–20 mph.

Alexander was secretary of the Zoological Society of London (1992–1999) which included supervising the management of London and Whipsnade Zoos. He was president of the Society for Experimental Biology (1995–1997), President of the International Society of Vertebrate Morphologists (1997–2001) and editor of the Proceedings of the Royal Society B (1998–2004). Alexander specialised in research on animal mechanics and published numerous books and research papers in the field from 1959.

== Film and TV work ==
- Horizon (1976) TV series documentary
- The Hot-Blooded Dinosaurs (1976)
- The Dinosaurs! (1992)
- Walking with Beasts (2001) TV series documentary (principal scientific advisor)
- The Future Is Wild (2003) TV series documentary
- Extinct: A Horizon Guide to Dinosaurs (2001) TV documentary

== Honours and awards ==
Alexander received several awards and honours during his career including:

- 1979 Linnean Medal for Zoology Linnean Society of London
- 1987 Elected a Fellow of the Royal Society (FRS)
- 2000 Birthday Honours List Commander of the Most Excellent Order of the British Empire (CBE)
- 2001 Foreign Honorary Member American Academy of Arts and Sciences
- 2002 Honorary Fellow Zoological Society of London
- 2003 Borelli Award American Society of Biomechanics

== Personal life ==
Alexander married Ann Elizabeth Coulton in 1961. They had a son and a daughter.

== Death ==
Alexander died in 2016, aged 81. He was survived by his wife and children.

== Selected publications ==
=== Books ===
- Functional Design in Fishes, Hutchinson University Library, 1967, 1970
- Animal Mechanics, Sidgwick & Jackson, 1968
- Size and Shape, Edward Arnold, 1971
- The Chordates, Cambridge University Press, 1975
- Mechanics and energetics of animal locomotion, with G. Goldspink, Halsted Press, 1977
- The Invertebrates, Cambridge University Press, 1979
- Optima for Animals, Hodder Arnold, 1982
- Locomotion of animals, Springer, 1985
- The Collins Encyclopedia of Animal Biology, HarperCollins Publishers, 1986
- Elastic Mechanisms in Animal Movement, Cambridge University Press, 1988
- Dynamics of Dinosaurs and other Extinct Giants, Columbia University Press, 1989
- Animals, Cambridge University Press, 1990
- How dinosaurs ran, Scientific American, 1991
- Animals, Cambridge University Press, 1991
- The Human Machine, Natural History Museum, Stationery Office Books, 1992
- Exploring Biomechanics: Animals in Motion, W H Freeman & Co, 1992
- Bones: The Unity of Form and Function, Macmillan General Reference, 1994
- Energy for Animal Life, Oxford University Press, 1999
- Exploring biomechanics: animals in motion, Scientific American Library, 1992
- Hydraulic mechanisms in locomotion, in Body Cavities: Function and Phylogeny, pp. 187–198, Selected Symposia and Monographs, 8, Mucchi.
- Principles of Animal Locomotion, Princeton University Press, 2003
- Human Bones: A Scientific and Pictorial Investigation, with Aaron Diskin, Pi Press, 2004
- Knochen! Was uns aufrecht hält – das Buch zum menschlichen Skelett, Spektrum Akademischer Verlag, 2006

=== Papers ===
(This is a small sample from over 250 papers)

- The Densities of Cyprinidae, 1959
- Visco-elastic properties of the body-wall of sea anemones, 1962
- Adaptation in the skulls and cranial muscles of South American characinoid fish, 1964
- Estimates of speeds of dinosaurs, 1976
- Bending of cylindrical animals with helical fibres in their skin or cuticle, 1987
- Tyrannosaurus on the run, 1996
- Dinosaur biomechanics, 2006
- Biomechanics: Stable Running, 2007
- Orangutans use compliant branches to lower the energetic cost of locomotion, 2007
- Incidence of healed fracture in the skeletons of birds, molluscs and primates, 2009
- Biomechanics: Leaping lizards and dinosaurs, 2012

Professional and academic associations
Preceded by Barry Albert Cross	Secretary of the Zoological Society of London; 1992–1999	Succeeded by Paul H. Harvey
