= Ann Varley =

Ann Varley is a Professor of Human Geography at University College London. Her research focus has been on housing and the home, looking at urban land and housing; family law and the home; law and urban governance; property formalization; gender, families and households. Latin America, in particular Mexico, has been where most of her work has been done, work for which she was awarded the Royal Geographical Society's Busk Medal in 2010.

== Awards ==
- Busk Medal Royal Geographical Society 2010

== Selected publications ==
- (2010) Los códigos del género: Prácticas del derecho en el México contemporáneo, Programa Universitario de Estudios de Género, Universidad Nacional Autónoma de México and United Nations Development Fund for Women, UNIFEM. (Edited with Helga Baitenmann and Victoria Chenaut).
- (2004) Ciudades ilegales: la ley y el urbanismo en países en vías de desarrollo, Programa de Capacitación para el Mejoramiento Socio Habitacional, Promesha (Edited book. with Edésio Fernandes).
- (1991) Landlord and Tenant: Housing the Poor in Urban Mexico, Routledge (with Alan Gilbert)
