= N. Mark Collins =

Nicholas Mark Collins (born 23 April 1952 in Cheltenham, Gloucestershire) was the Director of the Commonwealth Foundation from 2005 until 2011. He was replaced as interim director by Dhananjayan Sriskandarajah.

Collins received the Busk Medal of the Royal Geographical Society (RGS) in 2000.

He is the Chairman of the Galapagos Conservation Trust.
