= Martin Holdgate =

British biologist (born 1931)

Sir Martin Wyatt Holdgate
- Born: 14 January 1931 (age 95); Horsham, England
- Education: Queens' College, Cambridge University
- Known for: Environmental conservation work
- Awards: W. S. Bruce Medal, Companion of the Order of the Bath, UNEP Silver Medal, UNEP 500 Award, Commander Order of the Golden Ark, Patron's Medal of the Royal Geographical Society, Livingstone Medal of the Royal Scottish Geographical Society, Knight Bachelor, Honorary Fellow of the Zoological Society of London, Honorary member of the International Union for Conservation of Nature
- Scientific career
- Fields: Biology, Environmental Science
- Workplaces: Manchester University, Durham University, Cambridge University, British Antarctic Survey, Nature Conservancy Council, Department of the Environment, International Union for Conservation of Nature

Sir Martin Wyatt Holdgate CB (born 14 January 1931) is an English biologist and environmental scientist.

== Early life ==
Holdgate was born in Horsham, England on 14 January 1931, grew up in Blackpool, and was educated at Arnold School. He then attended Cambridge University as an undergraduate at Queens' College, Cambridge from 1949, graduating in 1952 with degrees in zoology and botany and, subsequently, a doctorate in insect physiology.

== Career ==
He taught at Manchester University, Durham University and Cambridge, as well as undertaking expeditions to Tristan da Cunha, south-west Chile and the Antarctic. He was Chief Biologist to the British Antarctic Survey, then research director of the Nature Conservancy Council and, for eighteen years, Chief Scientist and head of research at the Department of the Environment. Subsequently, he was Director General of the International Union for Conservation of Nature.

After his formal retirement, he was a member of the Royal Commission on Environmental Pollution and served as co-chair of the Intergovernmental Panel on Forests, and Secretary of the UN Secretary General's High-Level Board on Sustainable Development.

== Awards and honours ==
Holdgate has received numerous awards and honours for his work.

- 1964: W. S. Bruce Medal of the Royal Society of Edinburgh
- 1979: Companion of the Order of the Bath (CB)
- 1983: UNEP Silver Medal from the United Nations Environment Programme
- 1988: UNEP 500 Award also from the United Nations Environment Programme
- 1991: Commander Order of the Golden Ark (Netherlands)
- 1991: Honorary DSc from the University of Durham
- 1992: Patron's Medal of the Royal Geographical Society
- 1993: Livingstone Medal of the Royal Scottish Geographical Society
- 1993: Honorary DSc from the University of Sussex
- 1994: Knight Bachelor (styled Sir Martin Holdgate, CB)
- 1995: Honorary DSc from the University of Lancaster
- 1997: Honorary Fellow of Royal Holloway, University of London
- 2000: Honorary member of the International Union for Conservation of Nature (IUCN)
- 2005: Honorary Fellow of the Zoological Society of London
- 2006: Honorary DSc from Queen Mary, University of London

Holdgate has been President of the Zoological Society of London and of the Freshwater Biological Association. He is also a member and fellow of the Institute of Biology, making him a Chartered Biologist, and entitling him to use the designations C.Biol and F.I.Biol. In July 2014, he was appointed President of Friends of the Lake District.

== Publications ==
Holdgate edited the journal Antarctic Ecology (published for the Scientific Committee on Antarctic Research, by the Academic Press) from the first edition in 1970. His publications include the following:

- —— (1958). Mountains in the Sea. Macmillan; St.Martin's Press.
- —— (1979). A Perspective of Environmental Pollution. Cambridge University Press. ISBN 978-0521221979.
- —— (1996). From Care to Action. Hemisphere. ISBN 978-1560325604.
- —— (1999). The Green Web: A Union for World Conservation. Routledge. ISBN 978-1853835957.
- —— (2003). Penguins and Mandarins: Memories of Natural and Un-Natural History. Memoir Club. ISBN 978-1841040790.
- —— (2006). The Story of Appleby in Westmorland. Hayloft Publishing. ISBN 978-1904524359.
- —— (2009). Arnold: the story of a Blackpool school. Hayloft Publishing. ISBN 978-1904524632.

=== As editor ===
- The World Environment 1972–82. Tycooly International Publishing Ltd. 1982. ISBN 978-0907567141. (joint editor)
