= Peter Wadhams =

Peter Wadhams ScD
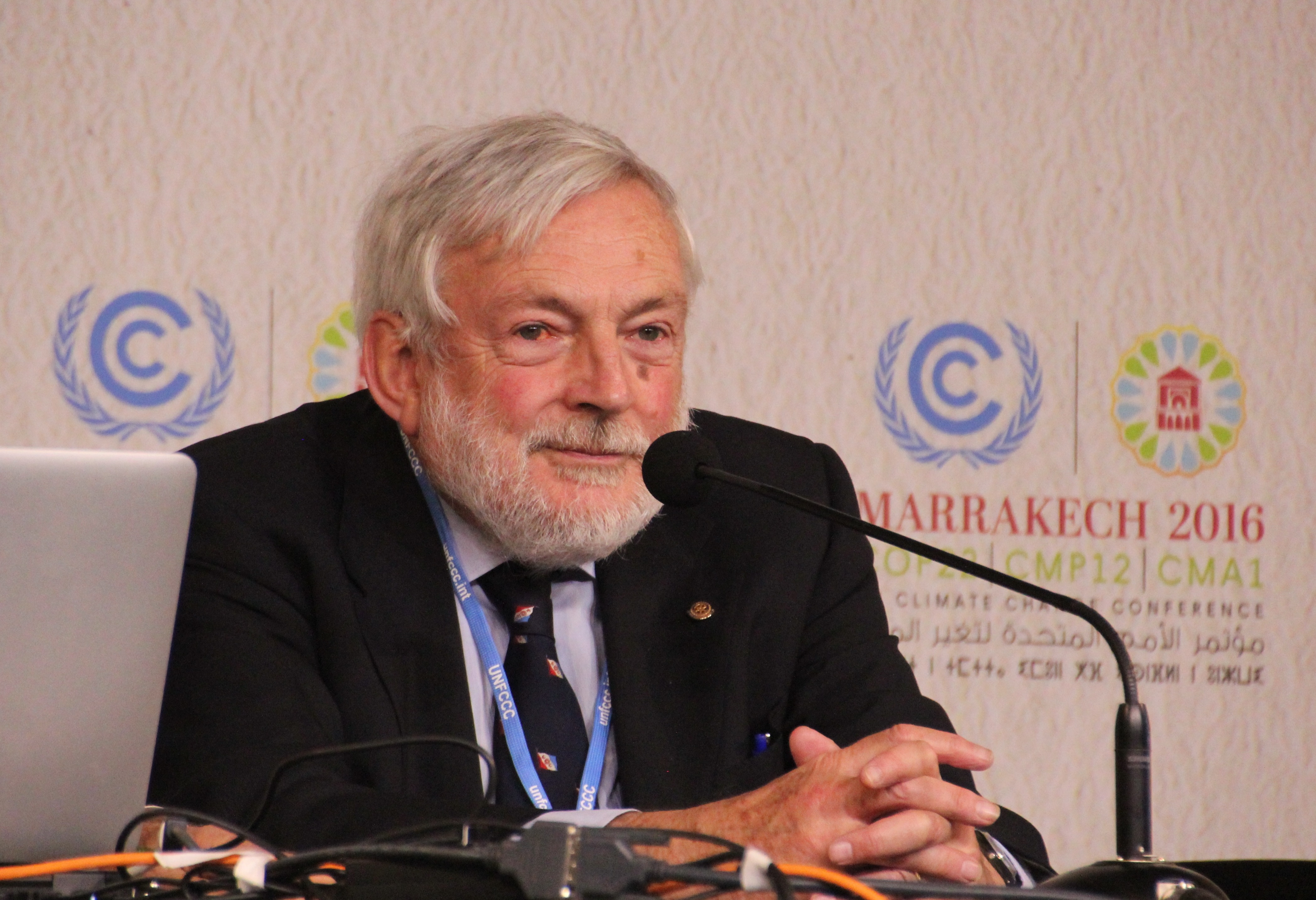
- Born: 22 December 1939 (age 86)
- Known for: Sea ice
- Awards: Italgas Prize for Environmental Sciences (1990); Polar Medal (1987); W S Bruce Medal (Royal Society of Edinburgh, 1977)
- Scientific career
- Workplaces: University of Cambridge

Peter Wadhams ScD (born 14 May 1948) is emeritus professor of Ocean Physics, and Head of the Polar Ocean Physics Group in the Department of Applied Mathematics and Theoretical Physics, University of Cambridge. He is best known for his work on sea ice.

== Career ==
Wadhams has been the leader of 40 polar field expeditions.

Wadhams advocates for the use of climate engineering to mitigate climate change.

Attempting to estimate when the Arctic Ocean will be "ice-free", Wadhams in 2014 predicted that by 2020 "summer sea ice to disappear," Wadhams and several others have noted that climate model predictions have been overly conservative regarding sea ice decline.

In 2021, Wadhams was the Chairman of Science Committee for Extreme E.

== Honours and awards ==
- 1977 W. S. Bruce Medal for his oceanographic investigations, especially in studying the behaviour of pack ice near Spitsbergen, the North Pole and off east Greenland
- 1987 Polar Medal
- 1990 Italgas Prize for Environmental Sciences

== See also ==
- Global warming controversy
- List of climate scientists
- Shutdown of thermohaline circulation
