= John Phillips (zoologist) =

British zoologist (1933–1987)

Professor John Guest Phillips FRS FZS (13 June 1933 – 14 March 1987) was an eminent biologist. He was born in Swansea and educated at Llanelli Boys' Grammar School and the University of Liverpool; where, after gaining his BSc, he joined the research group of Chester Jones to complete a PhD in endocrinology. Following his doctorate he took up a fellowship at the Bingham Oceanographic Laboratory at Yale University with Grace E. Pickford. After a lectureship at Sheffield University Phillips was appointed to the Chair of Zoology at the University of Hong Kong. He returned to the UK to become Professor of Zoology, from 1967 to 1979, and Dean of the Faculty of Science (1978-1980) at the University of Hull, Director of the Wolfson Institute for Gerontology (1979-1986) (located at the University of Hull) and later Vice-Chancellor of Loughborough University from 1986 to 1987. He was secretary of the Zoological Society of London. Phillips' research was predominantly in the fields of endocrinology, notably concerning the salt glands of sea birds, and the biological basis of ageing (gerontology).

Academic offices
Preceded by Sir Clifford Butler	Vice-Chancellor of Loughborough University; 1986–1987	Succeeded by Professor Sir David Davies
Professional and academic associations
Preceded by Erasmus Darwin Barlow	Secretary of the Zoological Society of London; 1982–1984	Succeeded by Richard M. Laws
