= Phil Gibbard =

English geologist (1949-)

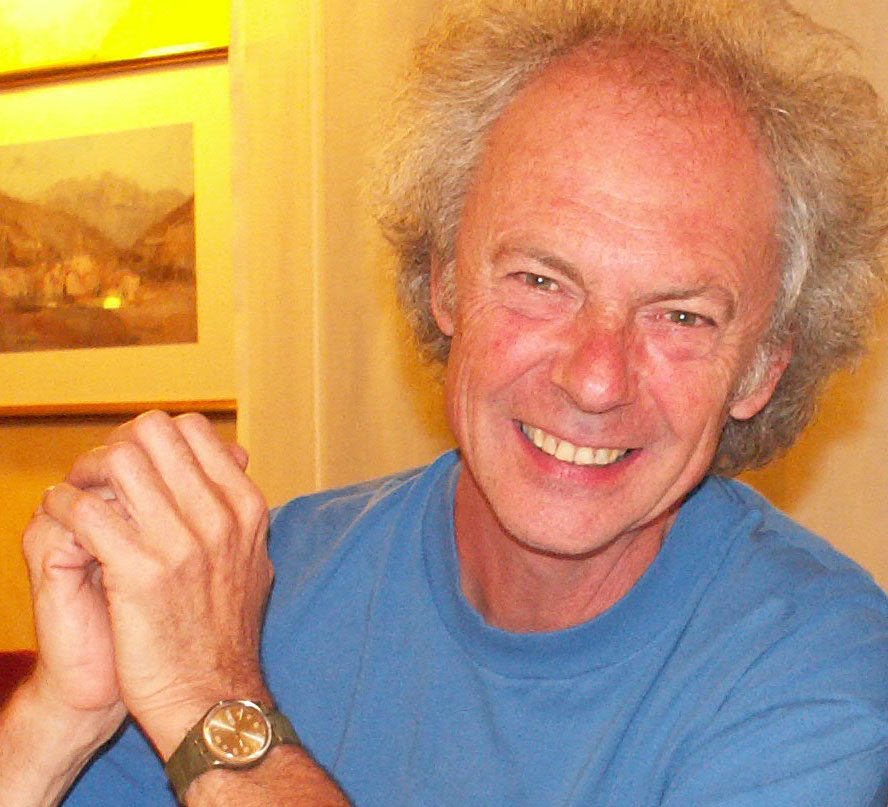
Philip Gibbard

Philip Leonard Gibbard (born 1949 in Chiswick, London) is a Quaternary geologist and has been Professor of Quaternary Palaeoenvironments in the University of Cambridge, Department of Geography since 2005. A PhD student of Professor Richard Gilbert West in the Subdepartment of Quaternary Research, University of Cambridge (1971–1974), he investigated the diversion of the River Thames from its course through Hertfordshire to its present course through London. Later he established the stratigraphy and palaeogeography of the Thames in the Middle (1985) and Lower Thames Valley (1994). He has since undertaken many collaborative, palaeoenvironmental investigations. This multidisciplinary approach has led to him working throughout Britain, offshore areas, especially the North Sea, English Channel and the formation of the Strait of Dover, and neighbouring countries. For an example of this work, see Britain's island heritage: reconstructing half a million years of history.

He spent 2 years in the University of Oulu, Finland (1974-6) and 1 year at the University of Western Ontario, Canada (1976–1977) as a post-doctoral worker before returning to Cambridge as a Post-doctoral Research Associate, and later as a Senior Post-Doctoral Research Associate, and was appointed to the University of Cambridge's staff as an Assistant Director of Research (in 1984).

In 1995 he and his research group were transferred to the University's Department of Geography. He was also appointed Docent in the Department of Geology, University of Helsinki, Finland in 1987.

Through co-operation with Jürgen Ehlers, his interest in glaciation has led to the publication of seven books. Most recently they were joint co-ordinators of an INQUA Commission on Glaciation workgroup which compiled an atlas of world Quaternary glaciation limits (see below Ehlers & Gibbard, 2004 a, b, c). He is also interested in the application of stratigraphical principles and chairs the International Commission on Stratigraphy Subcommission on Quaternary Stratigraphy.

Phil Gibbard was awarded the Geological Society's Lyell Fund prize in April 1999 'for excellence in Quaternary geology'. In 2010 Phil was awarded an honorary doctorate degree (PhD (honoris causa) by the University of Helsinki and a ScD degree in July 2009 by the University of Cambridge.

== Views ==
Gibbard argues that the Holocene should be classified as an age within the Pleistocene rather than a separate epoch. He further disagrees with the proposal of defining the Anthropocene as a new epoch.

== Notes ==
- Gibbard, P.L. 1985 Pleistocene history of the Middle Thames Valley. University Press: Cambridge 155pp.
- Gibbard, P.L. 1988 The history of the great north-west European rivers during the past three million years. Philosophical Transactions of the Royal Society of London B318, 559-602.
- Gibbard, P.L. 1994 The Pleistocene history of the Lower Thames Valley. University Press: Cambridge. 229pp.
- Ehlers, J., & Gibbard, P.L. (editors) 2004a Extent and chronology of Glaciation. Volume 1: Europe. Elsevier Science: Amsterdam 488pp.
- Ehlers, J., & Gibbard, P.L. (editors) 2004b Extent and chronology of Glaciation. Volume 2: North America. Elsevier Science: Amsterdam 450pp. *Ehlers, J., & Gibbard, P.L. (editors) 2004c Extent and chronology of Glaciation. Volume 3: South America, Asia, Africa, Australia, Antarctica. Elsevier Science: Amsterdam 433pp.
- Gibbard, P. 2007 Europe cut adrift. Nature 448, 259-260.
- Ehlers, J., Gibbard, P.L. & Hughes, P.D. (editors) 2011 Quaternary Glaciations - Extent and Chronology, Volume 15: a closer look. Elsevier Science: Amsterdam
