= List of fellows of the Royal Society elected in 1980 =

This is a list of fellows of the Royal Society elected in 1980.

== Fellows ==
- Montague Mattinson Pennell (1916–1981)
- John Arthur Shercliff (1927–1983)
- William Henry Wittrick (1922–1986)
- Herbert Williams Smith (1919–1987)
- Richard Evelyn Donohue Bishop (1925–1989)
- Walter Thompson Welford (1916–1990)
- Niels Kaj Jerne (1911–1994)
- Hannes Olof Gosta Alfven (1908–1995)
- John Burns Brooksby (1914–1998)
- Zbigniew Stanislaw Basinski (1928–1999)
- Henry Ellis Daniels (1912–2000)
- William Donald Hamilton (1936–2000)
- Frederick Gerard Friedlander (1917–2001)
- Douglas Hugh Everett (1916–2002)
- Paul Moritz Cohn (d. 2006)
- James Philip Elliott (d. 2008)
- Walter Eric Spear (d. 2008)
- Sir Alan Marshall Muir Wood (d. 2009)
- Sir Graham Collingwood Liggins (d. 2010)
- William Fleming Hoggan Jarrett (1928–2012)
- Kenneth Henderson Jack (d. 2013)
- Muhammad Akhtar
- Philip Warren Anderson
- Donald Charlton Bradley
- Brian Edgar Scourse Gunning
- Marshall Davidson Hatch
- Leslie Lars Iversen
- Alan Roy Katritzky
- Thomas Walter Bannerman Kibble
- Sir Anthony Seymour Laughton
- Richard Maitland Laws
- Sir Anthony James Leggett
- Anthony William Linnane
- Roger Parsons
- Sir George Karoly Radda
- Humphrey Peter Rang
- Sir Mark Henry Richmond
- Sir Derek Harry Roberts
- Louis Siminovitch
- Grenville Turner
- Lawrence Weiskrantz
- Lewis Wolpert
