= Michael Heffernan (academic) =

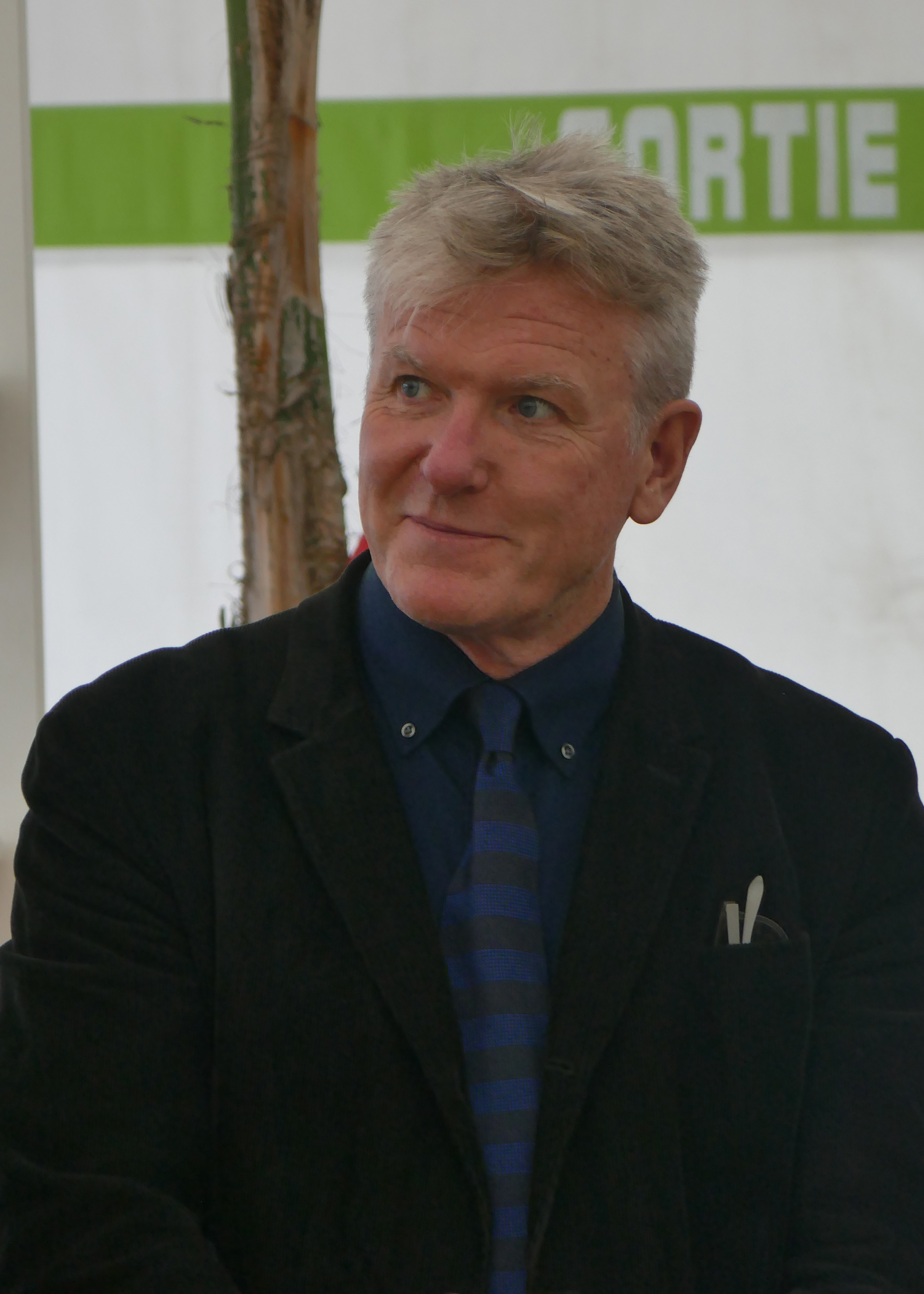
Michael Heffernan, member of the jury of the Vautrin Lud Prize (2019)

Michael John Heffernan FBA is a historical geographer and academic. Since 1999, he has been Professor of Historical Geography at the University of Nottingham.

== Career ==
Michael Heffernan was awarded a PhD at St John's College, Cambridge, in 1987 for his thesis on The Politics of Literacy: Cultural Change and Political Responses in Nineteenth-Century Provincial France. Heffernan joined Loughborough University as a lecturer in 1985, and was promoted to senior lecturer five years later, then to a readership in 1995. In 1999, he was appointed Professor of Historical Geography at the University of Nottingham.

According to his British Academy profile, Heffernan's research focuses on "the history of geography and cartography" and "the historical geography of France and the French Empire in the 19th and 20th centuries". More specifically, he has studied citizenship and national identity in late-19th- and early-20th-century France and Germany, as well as topics of war and memory between the First and Second World Wars, both with geographical and landscape dimensions, as well as the role of maps and the media in modern, western Europe.

== Honours and awards ==
In 2015, Heffernan was elected a Fellow of the British Academy, the United Kingdom's national academy for the humanities and social sciences.

== Selected publications ==
- The Meaning of Europe: Geography and Geopolitics (Edward Arnold, 1998).
