= Michael Mortimore =

British geographer (1937-2017)

Michael J. Mortimore
- Born: 7 September 1937 (age 89); Bermuda
- Died: 10 September 2017, Somerset, UK
- Education: University of Leeds, UK
- Occupations: Geographer, African drylands specialist
- Spouse: Julia

Michael Mortimore (7 September 1937, in Bermuda – 10 September 2017) was a British geographer and a prolific researcher of issues in the African drylands. He was an academic in Nigerian universities for over 25 years. He ran a British research consultancy, Drylands Research. He is best known for an anti-Malthusian account of population-environment relationships, More People, Less Erosion, and field-based studies of adaptation to drought.

== Background ==
Mortimore's father worked for Cable & Wireless plc and as a result, Mortimore was born in Bermuda and educated on Ascension Island, before boarding at Monkton Combe School in Somerset when his father was posted to Aden. He attended the University of Leeds (BA Geography 1960, MA 1962) where he met his wife, Julia. He left the UK in 1962 to become a lecturer in Nigeria.

He was involved in building Nigeria's capacity to train and support its own interdisciplinary research into human-environmental dynamics. He first taught and researched at Ahmadu Bello University, Zaria, between 1962 and 1979, during which time he trained many students, built a map library, and edited the journal Savanna. He was then Professor of Geography at the relatively new Bayero University, Kano, from 1979 to 1986. He then left Nigeria, preceded by his family, after religious extremism in Kano that targeted Christians.

Subsequently, he continued research studies as a Senior Research Associate in the Department of Geography, University of Cambridge, the Overseas Development Institute in London, and as an Honorary Fellow of the Centre of West African Studies, University of Birmingham.

He was a partner of a policy consultancy set up with Mary Tiffen in the 1990s, Dryland Research. He was an Honorary Senior Fellow at the University of Melbourne, Australia. He was a consultant for DFID, CIFOR, the UNCCD, DANIDA, the Natural Environment Research Council, and the Drylands Development Centre in Kano. He was a frequent visitor to Nigeria, latterly in 2016.

== Research contributions ==
Mortimore is known for his extensive studies of farming systems, environmental change and human adaptation to drought in the drylands of northern Nigeria, and comparative work in Kenya, Niger, and Senegal. He assessed local and regional human adaptations to a harsh and complex environment.

Mortimore produced several influential and thought provoking texts; these include Adapting to Drought (1989), Working the Sahel (with W.M. Adams, 1999) and a revisionist account of livelihoods in Machakos, Kenya entitled More People, Less Erosion (with M. Tiffen and F. Gichuki, 1994).

Mortimore's research and publications were all concerned with the drylands of Africa. Adapting to Drought was a summation of his long-held view that even the most disadvantaged African smallholders 'adapt' more or less successfully to climatic change and severe drought, rather than submitting to it. It was based on first-hand, blow-by-blow observation over 25 years, and particularly of the Sahelian famines and droughts of the late 1970s and 1980s. Wood fuel in Kano (with Reg Cline-Cole et al.) was an exhaustive study of the fuelwood market also conducted in the late 1980s following the major droughts.

One project Mortimore undertook from the UK in the 1990s was conducted with Prof. Bill Adams (Cambridge) and Nigerian colleagues, and using ESRC funding. It brought his earlier Nigeria research up to date and extended it through new field studies in the region, presenting a model of how agropastoralists deal with environmental and economic pressures in the region (see Working the Sahel, 1999).

From 1991, Mortimore embarked on a major project with Mary Tiffen and Francis Gichuki, in the Machakos Hills of Kenya. This region was long held to have suffered serious erosion accompanied by population growth. The researchers – after securing funding from a variety of sources – set about testing population-environment models and relationships. Leaning on (and improving on) Ester Boserup's work, they discovered population growth and environmental enhancement occurred thorough multicropping and other farming methods, terracing, and strong community organisations. Mortimore's comparisons of photographs from 1930 and 1990 revealed an improvement in landscapes and in resource management (rather than degradation and impoverishment, widely assumed to have been present), albeit with much higher population densities and altered labour regimes.

This finding 'controverted' Malthusian thinking. The 1993 launch of More People, Less Erosion at the ODI in London was electric – several staff members of the UK Department for International Development, the World Bank, and academic researchers from East Africa were there, and the study has echoed through revisionist thinking about African degradation myths and agrarian policy ever since. It remains a controversial and talked-about thesis on African development paths. It has been cited over 2500 times.

Mortimore's comparative work led him to speak with some authority about 'desertification', a word associated with the Sahel and with Africa. He was a long-term critic of the argument that the Sahara is 'spreading' as a result of poor land management, or that farmers and herders tend towards destroying their natural capital. In Adapting to Drought he challenged the well-funded international desertification apparatus and challenged it to listen to farmers who, with the right support, were improving biodiversity and halting land degradation without expensive and inappropriate interventions. Almost two decades later, and following interest in the Machakos model, he was actually engaged by the UN Convention to Combat Desertification to make this case to them (Mortimore 2005).

== Awards ==
- 1999. Busk Medal, Royal Geographical Society with the IBG.
- 2008. Netting Award for contributions to cultural ecology, Association of American Geographers.

== Death ==
Mortimore was active until close to his death, and two hip replacements meant he was cycling, his favourite mode of transport, until 2017. He died from aggressive cancer in September 2017.

== Key publications ==
BOOKS

- Mortimore, MJ and R Behnke (eds.). 2016. The End of Desertification? Disputing Environmental Change in the Drylands. Springer.
- Mortimore, MJ with contributions 2009. Dryland Opportunities: A new paradigm for people, ecosystems and development IUCN, Gland, Switzerland; IIED, London and UNDP/DDC, Nairobi.
- Mortimore, MJ. 2005. The Global Drylands Imperative: Achieving the Millennium Development Goals in the drylands of the world. Drylands Development Centre, Nairobi.
- Mortimore, MJ. 2004. Why invest in drylands? Global Mechanism of the UN Convention to Combat Desertification, Rome. http://www.drylandsresearch.org.uk/pdfs/Website2%20GM%20Published%20Why%20Invest%20in%20Drylands.pdf
- Mortimore MJ. & WM. Adams 1999. Working the Sahel. Society and environment in northern Nigeria. London: Routledge.
- Mortimore MJ. 1998. Roots in the African dust: sustaining the SubSaharan drylands. Cambridge University Press.
- Tiffen, M, Mortimore MJ. and F Gichuki. 1994. More people, less erosion. Environmental recovery in Kenya. Chichester: John Wiley
- English J, M. Tiffen, and MJ. Mortimore 1994. Land resource management in Machakos District, Kenya, 1930–1990. World Bank environment paper no. 5. Washington, D.C. : World Bank.
- Tiffen, M. and Mortimore, M.J. 1990. Theory and practice in plantation agriculture: an economic review. London: Overseas Development Institute.
- Cline-Cole, R.A., Main, H.A.C., Mortimore, M.J., Nichol, J.E., & O'Reilly, F.D. 1990, Wood fuel in Kano. United Nations University Press, Tokyo. :Report – http://www.odi.org.uk/fpeg/publications/greyliterature/fuelwood/clinecole/index.html
- Mortimore MJ. 1989 Adapting to drought: farmers, famines, and desertification in West Africa. Cambridge: Cambridge University Press.

SELECTED PAPERS

- Batterbury, S.P.J. and Mortimore, M.J. 2013. Adapting to drought in the West African Sahel. In Palutikof J. and D.Karoly (eds.) Natural disasters and adaptation to climate change. Cambridge University Press. pp149–157
- Mortimore, MJ. 2010. Adapting to drought in the Sahel: Lessons for climate change. Wiley Interdisciplinary Reviews: Climate Change. 1(1): 134 – 143
- Reynolds J.F., D.M. Stafford-Smith, E. Lambin, B.L. Turner II, M.J. Mortimore, S.P.J. Batterbury, T.E. Downing, H. Dowlatabadi, R.J. Fernandez, J.E. Herrick, E. Huber-Sannwald, H. Jiang, R. Leemans, T. Lynam, F. Maestre, B. Walker, and M. Ayarza. 2007. Global desertification: building a science for dryland development. Science. 316 (11 May): 847–851.
- Mortimore, MJ. 2006. Managing agricultural transition in African drylands. LEISA Magazine on Low External Input and Sustainable Agriculture (2006) 22(2): 32–34.

http://www.agriculturesnetwork.org/magazines/global/changing-farming-practices/managing-agricultural-transition-in-african/at_download/article_pdf
Trans.
2006. Transiçao da agricultura no semi-arido africano, Revista agriculturas experiensias em agroecologia 3/3: 29–32
2006. La transition agricole dans les zones arides d'Afrique, Agridape. Revue sur l’agriculture durable à faible apport externs 22/2: 29–31
2006. La transición agrócola en las zonas áridas africanas, Revista de Agroecología 22/3: 18–20.

- Mortimore MJ. 2005. Dryland development: success stories from West Africa. Environment, 47 (1).
- Mortimore, MJ & F Harris. 2005 Do small farmers' achievements contradict the nutrient depletion scenarios for Africa? Land Use Policy. 22, 43–56.
- Mortimore, MJ & B Turner. 2005. Does the Sahelian smallholder's management of woodland, farm trees, rangeland support the hypothesis of human-induced desertification? Journal of Arid Environments. 63, 567–595.
- Mortimore, MJ. and Tiffen, M. 2004. Introducing research into policy: lessons from district studies of dryland development in Sub-Saharan Africa. Development Policy Review 22(3): 259–286.*Tiffen, M. and MJ. Mortimore. 2002. Questioning desertification in dryland sub-Saharan Africa, Natural Resources Forum. 26(3), 218–233.
- Mortimore, MJ. 2001. Overcoming variability and productivity constraints in Sahelian agriculture. In: Benjaminsen, T. and Lund, C (eds.), Politics, property and production in the West African Sahel. Understanding natural resources management. Uppsala: Nordiska Afrikainstitutet. 233–255
- Mortimore, MJ. and WM Adams 2001. Farmer adaptation, change and ‘crisis’ in the Sahel. Global Environmental Change, 11, 49–57.
- Lambin EF, BL Turner, HJ Geist, SB Agbola, A Angelsen, JW Bruce, O. Coomes, R Dirzo, G Fischer, C Folke, P.S. George, K Homewood, J Imbernon, R Leemans, X Li, E Moran, MJ Mortimore, P.S. Ramakrishnan, JF. Richards, H Skånes. 2001. The causes of land-use and land-cover change: moving beyond the myths. Global Environmental Change 11(4): 261–269.
- Busso, C.S., Devos, K.M., Ross, G., Mortimore, M., Adams, W.M., Ambrose, M.J., Alldrick, S. and Gale, M.D. 2000. Genetic diversity within and among landraces of pearl millet (Pennisetum glaucum) under farmer management in West Africa. Genetic Resources and Crop Evolution 47: 561–568.
- Mortimore, M.J, Harris, F., and Turner B. 1999. Implications of land use change for the production of plant biomass in densely populated Sahelo-Sudanian shrub-grasslands in north-east Nigeria, Global Ecology and Biogeography, 8 243–256.
- Mortimore MJ. and W.M.Adams 1997. Agricultural intensification and flexibility in the Nigerian Sahel. The Geographical Journal, 163:150-60.
- Mortimore, MJ, M Tiffen. 1994. Population growth and a sustainable environment: the Machakos story. Environment 36(8) 10–20, 28–32.
- Mortimore, MJ, M Tiffen and F Gichuki. 1994. Population growth and environmental recovery: policy lessons from Kenya. Gatekeeper series 45. London: International Institute for Environment and Development.
- Tiffen, M. and Mortimore, MJ. 1994. Malthus controverted: The role of capital and technology in growth and environment recovery in Kenya. World Development, 22(7): 997–1010.
- Mortimore MJ. 1993. Population growth and Land Degradation. GeoJournal, 31(1), 15–21.
- Mortimore, M.J.. 1993, The intensification of peri-urban agriculture: the Kano Close-Settled Zone, 1964–86, in Turner B.L.II, R. W. Kates, & G. L. Hyden, (eds.) Population growth and agricultural change in Africa. University Press of Florida, Gainesville, pp. 358–400.
- Mortimore, M.J. 1991. Five faces of famine. In Bohle HG, Cannon T, Hugo G and Ibrahim, FN. (eds.) Famine and food security in Africa and Asia. Bayreuth: University of Bayreuth. 11–36.
- Mortimore, M.J. 1969. Landownership and Urban Growth in Bradford and Its Environs in the West Riding Conurbation, 1850-1950. Transactions of the Institute of British Geographers 46: 105-119.
