= The International Alliance for Women =

Nonprofit corporation

The International Alliance for Women (TIAW), formerly known as The National Alliance (1980–1986) and The International Alliance of Professional and Executive Women (TIA) (1986–2002), is a nonprofit corporation founded in 1980 to promote and support the economic empowerment of women around the world. The organization was founded by Mandy Goetze.

TIAW is based in Spokane, Washington, USA.

In 2025, the president is Donna Meredith.
