= William M. Adams =

British geographer

William "Bill" M. Adams (born 1955) is a British geographer. He is the Claudio Segré professor of conservation and development at the Graduate Institute of International and Development Studies in Geneva. He was previously professor of Conservation and Development in the Department of Geography at the University of Cambridge.

== Personal life ==
Adams studied geography and graduated with a B.A. from the University of Cambridge, followed by an M.Sc. in conservation, from the University College London. He obtained a Ph.D. at the University of Cambridge. He has been awarded an Honorary Doctorate from the Stockholm University, and the Royal Geographical Society's Busk Medal in 2004.

== Work ==
Bill Adams is a member of the Political Ecology group. He explores the ideas behind conservation initiatives and resource management, and the implications of these ideas in practice.

His research fields are:

- Conservation of landscapes that have been heavily modified by human influences (Sahel, urban environment)
- the political ecology of nature conservation at the landscape level
- the institutional large-scale ecological restoration of ecosystems
- Ecosystem services and protection concepts

== Publications ==
=== Books ===
- Adams (2003): Beyond Extinction: The Story of Conservation. Kogan Page.
- Adams (2003): Future Nature: a vision for conservation. Revised edition, Earthscan.
- Adams and Mulligan (2003): Decolonizing Nature: strategies for conservation a postcolonial era. Earthscan / James & James.
- Adams (2008): Conservation. Routledge.
- Adams (2009): Green Development: environment and sustainability in a developing world. 3rd edition, Routledge.
- Leader-Williams, Adams and Smith (2010): Trade-offs in Conservation. Wiley-Blackwell.
