= William Maurice Brown =

New Zealand army officer

William Maurice Brown (1910–1974) was the first principal of Faujdarhat Cadet College, one of the 12 Cadet Colleges of Bangladesh. He was then a retired Lieutenant Colonel of the New Zealand Army. He was a recipient of Britain's Order of British Empire, and an observer (Extra Ordinary) of the United Nations.

== Early life ==
Principal Brown was born 21 Jun 1910 in Granity, Buller, West Coast Region, South Island, New Zealand, to Ewart Gladstone Brown, an engineer, and Isabelle Mary (Patton) Brown, and spent his school days in the Waikato region. In 1930, after achieving a teaching diploma from Auckland College of Education and a degree in history from Auckland University College, he served in various schools and colleges there. He was commissioned in the First Auckland Regiment in 1931. During the war he joined the Royal Air Force as Squadron Leader and later in the Royal New Zealand Air Force. Then he earned an honours degree in Geography specialising in Geomorphology from King's College, Cambridge with a government scholarship. He also spent some time in Scott Polar Research Institute, studying one of his favourite interests - mountains, snow & ice. Back in his country in the early 1950s, he joined University before returning to the army again.

Lt Col Maurice Brown was also a Fellow of the Royal Geographical Society. He quoted once that he became a fellow for his expedition to climb Mount Everest. Principal Brown took a keen interest in geography that was taught as an optional subject at the Intermediate Science course of his college. He sometimes lectured the students, specially on Physical Geography, which was part of the curriculum. He also lectured on projections, as part of cartography, the science of accurately depicting round earth (reduced earth, globe) on plain sheet of paper.

== Career positions ==
He served the UN as a New Zealand Representative and military observer in the United Nations Military Observer Group in India and Pakistan (UNMOGIP) in the UN mediation of the Kashmir dispute in Kashmir. Then in the Middle East, he was successively the Chairman of the Egypt/Israel Mixed Armistice Commissions, for the UN troops Supervisory Organization in the Gaza Strip and later in 1958 as Chief Military Observer of the UN in Lebanon. From there he joined the Faujdarhat Cadet College in August 1958.

== In Cadet College ==
Col. Brown acted as the principal of Faujdarhat Cadet College for as many as seven years. During this period the college advanced much and the reputation of cadet college system was spread throughout Bangladesh. Col. Brown's motto was "Love your country, tell the truth and don't dawdle". His wife Mrs. Brown also helped him running the governing body of the college.

== See also ==
- Faujdarhat Cadet College
- Cadet Colleges in Bangladesh
- Voluntary Service Overseas
- New Zealand Army
