= Hal Lister =

- Born: Harold Lister; May 1, 1921; Keighley, West Yorkshire
- Died: February 24, 2010 (aged 88)
- Education: Fitzwilliam College

Hal Lister (1 May 1921 – 24 February 2010) was a British geographer and Arctic explorer.

Lister was born Harold Lister in Keighley, West Yorkshire, and was educated at Keighley Grammar School and King's College (which later became Newcastle University). In 1948, Lister guided a small group of Newcastle University Geography undergraduates on a pioneering overseas expedition to Iceland. Lister joined the Merchant Navy, but transferred to the Royal Navy after learning to fly. He went to Fitzwilliam College, Cambridge, in 1950 to do research in the Department of Geography, interrupted by his participation as a glaciologist in the British North Greenland Expedition, 1952–1954. His Ph.D. was awarded in 1956. Hal was a glaciologist during the Commonwealth Trans-Antarctic Expedition, 1955-1958. During this expedition led by Sir Vivian Fuchs he helped to develop maps of the Weddell Sea. Lister’s last post was as a reader at the School of Geography, Newcastle University. Lister formerly retired in 1986, but continued to travel widely and meet in academic circles until the last few years before his death on 24 February 2010. One of his later interests was Amnesty International.

== Education ==
- Keighley Grammar School
- King's College (which later became Newcastle University)
- Fitzwilliam College, University of Cambridge

== Scholarship ==
In academic circles, Lister was best known for his work in glaciology and his exploration story telling. He was an active member of the International Glaciological Society for many years. Lister’s enthusiasm for exploration was expressed in his involvement with the Young Explorers’ Trust, the British Schools Exploring Society, the Royal Geographical Society and the Brathay Exploration Society.
