= Milton Thiago de Mello =

Brazilian primatologist (1916–2024)

- Born: 5 February 1916; Rio de Janeiro, Brazil
- Died: 1 October 2024 (aged 108)
- Education: Escola Nacional de Medicina Veterinária, 1946, D.Sc, Microbiology, Rio de Janeiro
- Known for: Founding Brazilian primatology
- Awards: Grã-Cruz Medal of Merit
- Scientific career
- Fields: Primatology, veterinary, medicine, conservation
- Workplaces: University of Brasília

Milton Thiago de Mello (5 February 1916 – 1 October 2024) was a Brazilian primatologist. He was a strong voice for biological conservation of Brazil's megadiverse flora and fauna.

As a professional veterinarian and zoological researcher, de Mello had received awards and distinctions from many governments and organizations, such as those from the Comité Français de l’Association Mondiale Vétérinaire, the World Veterinary Epidemiology Society, the Sociedad Colombiana de Primatologia and the John Guggenheim Memorial. He was an honorary member of the Royal Academy of Veterinary Sciences of London, the American Academy of Microbiology, and the New York Academy of Sciences. He was awarded the Medal of Merit in Veterinary Medicine, at the highest level (Grã-Cruz). He was a consultant with the Pan-American Health Organization and the Food and Agriculture Agency of the United Nations. He belonged to more than 30 Brazilian and international scientific societies, of which he had helped found 14 and served as an official of at least 12. He was the author of numerous books and over 150 scientific papers on primates, brucellosis, bubonic plague, medical mycology, the teaching of veterinary medicine, and the environmental crisis in Brazil and other countries.

The recently founded Milton Thiago de Mello Environmental Institute, in Sobradinho, Distrito Federal, Brazil, is named after him.

Almost all Brazilian primatologists have, at one time or another, studied under de Mello.

De Mello turned 100 in February 2016 and died on 1 October 2024, at the age of 108.

== See also ==
- Milton's titi
