= Kevin R. Cox =

British-American geographer

- Born: 1939 (age 86–87); Warwick, England
- Education: Cambridge University (BA, 1961); University of Illinois at Urbana–Champaign (PhD, 1966)
- Occupation: Geographer
- Employer: Ohio State University
- Known for: Political geography; urban studies; geography of voting
- Awards: Honors Award (1985); Guggenheim Scholar (2001); Lifetime Achievement Award (2012); Festschrift published in his honor (2012)

Kevin R. Cox (born in Warwick, England in 1939) is an Anglo-American geographer who holds the position of Distinguished University Professor, in the Department of Geography, of Ohio State University.

== Biography ==
He holds a BA degree from Cambridge University (1961) and a PhD from the University of Illinois at Urbana–Champaign (1966), and has since then taught at Ohio State. He is commonly seen as a political geographer.

== Work ==
He was initially prominent in the revival of geographic studies of voting. Drawing on the methods of the spatial-quantitative research, he demonstrated the significance of where people live and their connections over space for how they vote. This in turn led to an interest in a newly emerging field of behavioral geography and the collection, edited with Reg Golledge, Behavioral Problems in Geography: A Symposium (1969).

Most of his later work has been focused on urban studies, inspired by various forms of political economy, initially inspired by the then au courant welfare geography (Location and Public Problems). One of his contributions was work on resident organizations, establishing their raison d'être and situating them historically. This was followed by an increasing emphasis on the implications of Marxism for studying the politics of urbanization. He has been interested in the role of growth coalitions in the politics of local development and how the American politics contrasts with that of the countries of Western Europe; something discussed at length in The Politics of Urban and Regional Development and the American Exception and in Boomtown Columbus. He has also worked on the history of geographic thought. His Making Human Geography was described in a review in Economic Geography as ‘a towering contribution that brings a fresh, novel, and compelling proposition to the table’. More recent work has included a book on South Africa (Geohistory, Capitalist Development and South Africa: From Racial Domination to Zim-Lite) and one on making Marxism more accessible to geographers (An Advanced Introduction to Marxism and Human Geography). Based on a much earlier grounding in physical geography he has been a keen advocate of the unity of the field as in his recent book Geography Indivisible.

Former graduate advisees include John Agnew, Raju Das, Kim England, Alistair Fraser, Andy Jonas, Bae-Gyoon Park, and Andrew Wood.

He has been a recipient of the Honors Award (1985) and the Lifetime Achievement Award (2012) of the Association of American Geographers. He has been a Guggenheim Scholar (2001). At Ohio State he received the Distinguished Scholar Award (1997) and is currently Distinguished University Professor (2003).

A festschrift was published in his honor in 2012.

== Publications ==
His books are:

- Man, Location and Behavior: An Introduction to Human Geography. New York, 1972: John Wiley.
- Conflict, Power and Politics in the City: A Geographic Approach. New York 1973: McGraw Hill Inc.
- Location and Public Problems: An Introduction to Political Geography. Chicago 1979: Maaroufa Press.
- Political Geography: State, Territory and Politics. Oxford 2002: Blackwell.
- Making Human Geography. New York 2013: Guilford Press.
- The Politics of Urban and Regional Development and the American Exception. Syracuse NY 2016: Syracuse University Press.
- Boomtown Columbus: Ohio’s Sunbelt City and How Developers Got Their Way. Ohio State Press 2021.
- An Advanced Introduction to Marxism and Human Geography. Edward Elgar 2021.
- Geography Indivisible: How and Why Configuration Matters. Routledge 2022.
- Geohistory, Capitalist Development and South Africa: From Racial Domination to Zim-Lite. Brill, 2025.
- The Sunlit Uplands: A Childhood and Coming-of-Age Memoir. Market Harborough: Troubador Press.

Some of his key peer-reviewed publications include:

- "The Voting Decision in a Spatial Context," in C Board, R J Chorley, P Haggett and D R Stoddart (Eds.), Progress in Geography I London, 1969: Edward Arnold, pp. 81–117.
- "Social Change, Turf Politics and Concepts of Turf Politics," in A. Kirby, P. Knox and S. Pinch (Eds.), Public Provision and Urban Development. London, 1984: Croom Helm.
- "Globalization, Competition and the Politics of Local Economic Development," Urban Studies (1995) 32:2, 213-224.
- "Spaces of Dependence, Spaces of Engagement and the Politics of Scale, or: Looking for Local Politics," Political Geography (1998) 17:1, 1-24.
- (with R Negi) "The State and the Question of Development in Sub-Saharan Africa," Review of African Political Economy 37:123 (2010), 71-85.
- "Notes on a Brief Encounter: Critical Realism, Historical Materialism and Human Geography," Dialogues in Human Geography 3:1 (2013), 3-21.
- "Territory, Scale, and Why Capitalism Matters," Territory, Politics and Governance 1:1 (2013), 46-61.
