= Chris Robinson (radio personality) =

Canadian broadcaster

Chris Robinson is a Canadian broadcaster known for his content concerning travel and vacations. He is sometimes consulted by Canadian media and travel organizations for his views on development in the travel industry, both in Canada and internationally. He has conducted weekly radio shows on "The Chris Robinson Travel Show". Initially on Newstalk 1010 CFRB and then on AM 740 in Ontario and CJAD 800 in Montreal, Quebec. The shows air at 11 AM on Saturdays and Sundays in Ontario and on Saturdays in Quebec. Robinson owns and operates a blog about travel with details about his travels in association with the radio programs, as well as Facebook, Pinterest and podcasts of the Travel Shows. Robinson is also a travel writer who contributes to several publications.

== Background ==
Robinson was born in Northampton, UK in 1956 and was educated at Wellingborough School, before completing a degree in Geography at Magdalene College, Cambridge University in 1978. He married Dara Beard in 1979. They have two sons: Phillip (1989) and Tim (1994). In 1995, the family moved to Toronto, Canada, and became Canadian citizens.

== Career ==
Robinson's professional background is rooted in travel; commencing in the UK in the late 1970s when he joined Thomson Holidays, the world's largest Tour Operator, later becoming a General Manager. After positions with Diner's Club UK, Avis Europe, and Saatchi & Saatchi Advertising, Robinson became General Manager of Sovereign Holidays at the old Owners Abroad Group, a leading UK holiday company. He participated in the re-launch of the group as First Choice Holidays in 1994, and the following year performed a similar role for the company's Canadian Tour Operations as they became Signature Vacations. Robinson stayed in Canada as National Marketing Director at Signature, one of Canada's largest Tour Operators. In 2001, he moved to lead the marketing team at Sunquest Vacations, another of Canada's leading vacation companies. In 2003, Robinson set up his own company, Chris Robinson Associates, where he produces and hosts the Chris Robinson Travel Show (on AM 740 Zoomer Radio Toronto and CJAD 800 Montreal). He advised the Canadian Tourism Commission (now Destination Canada) on their Canada Marketing Committee for ten years and was elected Board Member and Treasurer for Discover America in Canada in 2007. He is a professional travel writer, co-author of the textbook, "Marketing for Tourism", and a Fellow of the Institute of Travel and Tourism and of the Royal Geographical Society.
