= Gold Medal (RGS) =

Award presented by the Royal Geographical Society

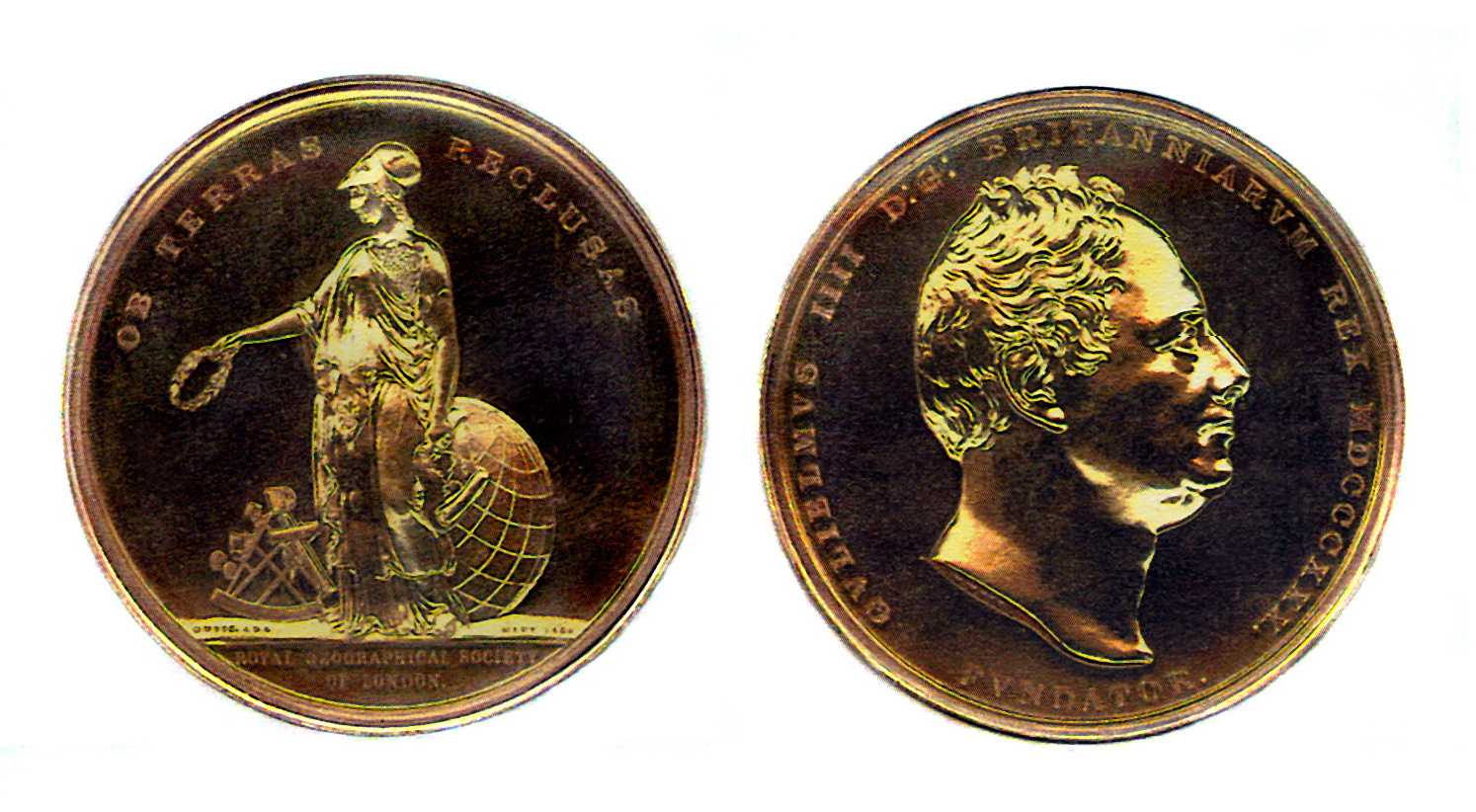
Founder's Medal awarded to Kenneth Mason

The Royal Geographical Society's Gold Medal consists of two separate awards: the Founder's Medal 1830 and the Patron's Medal 1838. Together they form the most prestigious of the society's awards. They are given for "the encouragement and promotion of geographical science and discovery." Royal approval is required before an award can be made.

The awards originated as an annual gift of fifty guineas from King William IV, first made in 1831, "to constitute a premium for the encouragement and promotion of geographical science and discovery." The Royal Geographical Society decided in 1839 to change this monetary award into the two gold medals. Prior to 1902 the Patron's Medal was alternatively known as the "Victoria Medal".

Recipients include David Livingstone in 1855, Mary Somerville in 1869, Nain Singh Rawat in 1877, Ferdinand von Richthofen in 1878, Alfred Russel Wallace in 1892 and William Woodville Rockhill in 1893, to more recent winners including William Morris Davis in 1919, Sir Halford John Mackinder in 1945, Paul-Émile Victor in 1952, Richard Chorley in 1987 and David Harvey in 1995.

== Recipients (since 1970) ==
Source: List of Past Gold Medal Winners by RGS

Date	Founder's Medal	Contribution	Patron's Medal	Contribution
2026	Enric Sala	For the encouragement and promotion of geographical science and discovery	Loretta Lees	For contributions to geographical science
2025	Børge Ousland	For the encouragement and promotion of geographical science and discovery	Susan J. Smith	For the encouragement and promotion of geographical science and discovery
2024	Vanessa Lawrence	For outstanding contributions to the Society and to the promotion of geography in the UK and internationally	Stephen Venables	For his lifetime’s contribution to geographical discovery in the high mountains of the world
2023	Andrew Mitchell	For his lifetime’s contribution to protect tropical rainforests and combat climate change	Felix Driver	For his contributions to the Society and historical geography
2022	David Hempleman-Adams	For enabling science through expeditions, and inspiring younger generations of geographers	Jane Francis	For her contributions to the earth and environmental sciences
2021	Andy Eavis	For significant contribution in leading speleological expeditions, exploring and recording some of the largest caves in the world for over 50 years	Rita Gardner	For widespread advancement of Geography across all its sub-disciplines through her Directorship of the Royal Geographical Society (with IBG)
2020	Heather Viles	For her excellence in establishing the field of biogeomorphology	Michael Jones	For his contribution to the development of geospatial information
2019	Trevor Barnes	for sustained excellence and pioneering developments in the field of economic geography	Fiona Reynolds	for her contribution to environmental protection, conservation and the preservation of the British landscape
2018	Paul Rose	for scientific expeditions and enhancing public understanding	Yadvinder Malhi	for world leading studies on the impact of climate change on tropical ecosystems
2017	Gordon Conway	for the enhancement and promotion of agricultural development in Asia and Africa	Lindsey Hilsum	for promoting the understanding of global conflict and inequality
2016	Michael Storper	for scholarship and leadership in human and economic geography	Bob Geldof	for raising global public awareness and challenging the causes of inequality in Africa
2015	Michael Batty	for development and promotion of the geographical science of cities	Paul Theroux	for the encouragement of geographical discovery through travel writing
2014	Geoffrey Boulton	for the development and promotion of glaciology	Hans Rosling	for the encouragement and development of the public understanding of geographical data and influencing decision makers across the world
2013	Keith Richards	for the encouragement and development of physical geography and fluvial geomorphology	Michael Palin	for the promotion of geography and geographical education
2012	Charles Withers	for the encouragement and development of historical and cultural geography	Alastair Fothergill	for promoting globally the understanding of the world's environments
2011	David Livingstone	for the encouragement and promotion of historical geography	Sylvia Earle	for the encouragement, development and promotion of ocean science and exploration
2010	Diana Liverman	encouraging, developing and promoting understanding of the human dimensions of climate change	Jack Dangermond	promoting geographical science through the development of Geographical Information Systems
2009	Alan Baker	contributions to historical geography	Nicholas Stern	for contributions to climate change policy
2008	Julian Dowdeswell	encouragement, development and promotion of glaciology	Jesse Walker	encouragement, development and promotion of coastal geomorphology
2007	Roger Barry	international leadership of research on climate and climate change	Paul Curran	international development of geographical science through remote sensing and Earth observation
2006	Derek Gregory	international leadership of research in human geography and social theory	Jack Ives	role internationally in establishing the global importance of mountain regions
2005	Nicholas Shackleton	research on Quaternary palaeoclimatology	Jean Malaurie	lifelong study of the Arctic and its peoples
2004	Leszek Starkel	advancing international understanding of palaeohydrology and geomorphology	Sydney Possuelo	contributions to Brazilian people's rights and explorations in Amazonia
2003	Michael Frank Goodchild	contributions to geographical information science	Harish Kapadia	contributions to geographical discovery and mountaineering in the Himalayas
2002	Bruno Messerli	mountain research and the public awareness of mountain issues	David Keeble	advancing knowledge in economic and industrial geography
2001	William Graf	research on dryland river processes, and the interactions of science and public policy	Reinhold Messner	mountaineering and mountain regions
2000	Brian Robson	urban geography and geographical perspectives to urban policy	Crispin Tickell GCMG KCVO	promoting the understanding of global environmental issues in governmental and wider public arena
1999	Mike Kirkby	development of processed-based and modelling approaches in geomorphology	Doug Scott, CBE	mountaineering and the knowledge of mountain regions
1998	Robert Bennett		David Drewry	
1997	Tony Wrigley		David Rhind	
1996	John Woods		John Thornes	
1995	The Earl of Cranbrook		David Harvey	
1994	Ronald Urwick Cooke		Ghillean Prance	
1993	Kenneth Gregory		John Blashford-Snell	
1992	Alan Wilson		Martin Holdgate	
1991	Andrew Goudie		Helge and Anne Stine Ingstad	
1990	John Hemming		Richard Leakey	
1989	Monica Kristensen		Keith Clayton	
1988	Peter Hall		Nigel de Northrop Winser	
1987	Anthony Laughton		Richard J Chorley	
1986	Timothy Severin		Peter Haggett	
1985	David Attenborough		Walter Smith	
1984	Ranulph Fiennes		Pierre Gourou	
1983	Peter Scott		John Young, NASA	
1982	Michael Ward		Douglas Warren	
1981	Keith J Miller		Valter Schytt	
1980	William Richard Mead		Preston James	
1979	David Stoddart	For contributions to geomorphology, the study of coral reefs and the history of academic Geography	Robin Hanbury-Tenison	For leadership of scientific expeditions, including the Mulu Expedition, and for his work on behalf of primitive peoples
1978	Major-General R. Brown	For services to the science of map-making	Mieczysław Klimaszewski	For his contributions to geomorphology and international understanding in Geography
1977	Michael John Wise	For economic Geography, and for his contributions to international understanding in geographical teaching	Kenneth Hare	For discoveries in Arctic Geography
1976	Brian B. Roberts	For Polar exploration, and for contributions to Antarctic research and political negotiation	Edmund Irving	For services as Hydrographer of the Navy and for his encouragement of exploration
1975	Laurence P. Kirwan	For contributions to the geographical history of the Nubian Nile valley and Eastern Africa, and for services to exploration	Joachim P. Kuettner	For explorations of the Earth's atmosphere and oceans
1974	Christian J. S. Bonington	For mountain explorations	Gordon de Q. Robin	For polar research and exploration
1973	Norman L. Falcon	Leader, the RGS's Musandam [North Oman] Expedition. For contributions to the geographical history of the Persian Gulf region	Edgar H. Thompson	of photogrammetry and surveying, University College London
1972	George S. Ritchie	For hydrographical charting and oceanographical exploration	Michael D. Gwynne	Leader, the RGS's South Turkana (Kenya] Expedition
1971	George Deacon	For oceanographical research and exploration	Charles Swithinbank	For glaciological research and exploration
1970	Walter William Herbert	For Arctic and Antarctic exploration and surveys	Haroun Tazieff	For volcanological research and exploration

== Recipients (1901–1970) ==
Date	Founder's Medal	Contribution	Patron's Medal	Contribution
1969	Rodolfo N. M. Panzarini	For services to Antarctic exploration and research and to international co-operation in Antarctic science	R. Thorsteinsson and E. T. Tozer	For contributions to exploration and economic development in the Canadian Arctic
1968	W. Brian Harland	For Arctic exploration and research	Augusto Gansser	For geological exploration and mapping in the Himalaya
1967	Claudio and Orlando Vilas Boas (two of the Villas-Bôas brothers)	For contributions to exploration and development in the Mato Grosso	Eduard Imhof	For contributions to cartography
1966	E. J. H. Corner	For botanical exploration in North Borneo and the Solomon Islands	G. Hattersley-Smith	For glaciological investigations in the Canadian Arctic
1965	Ernest F. Rootes	For Polar exploration and research, with special reference to the Canadian Arctic	Lester C. King	For geomorphological exploration in the Southern Hemisphere
1964	L. S. B. Leakey	For palaeographical exploration and discoveries in East Africa	Thor Heyerdahl	For geographical explorations in the South Pacific Ocean
1963	Jacques-Yves Cousteau	For underwater exploration and research	Albert P. Crary	For Antarctic research and exploration
1962	Erwin McDonald, USN	For coastal explorations in the Bellingshausen Sea (Antarctica)	Tom Harrisson	Government Ethnologist and Curator Sarawak Museum, for explorations in Central Borneo
1961	Mikhail M. Somov	For Antarctic exploration and research	John Bartholomew	Editor 'The Times Atlas of the World', for contributions to cartography
1960	Phillip G. Law	For Antarctic exploration and research	Theodore Monod	For geographical exploration and research in the Sahara
1959	W. R. Anderson, USN	For the first trans-Polar submarine voyage in command of USS Nautilus	Raymond Priestley	For services to Antarctic exploration
1958	Paul A. Siple	For contributions to Antarctic exploration and research	Edmund Hillary	For Antarctic and Himalayan exploration
1957	Ardito Desio	For geographical exploration and surveys in the Himalayas	George Binney	For contributions to Arctic exploration
1956	John Giaever	Leader of the Norwegian-British-Swedish Antarctic Expedition, for contributions to Polar exploration	Charles Evans	For contributions to Himalayan exploration
1955	John K. Wright	For services in the development of geographical research and exploration	C. J. W. Simpson	Leader of the British North Greenland Expedition
1954	John Hunt	Leader of the British Mount Everest Expedition	Neil A. Mackintosh	For research and exploration in the Southern Ocean
1953	P. D. Baird	For explorations in the Canadian Arctic	Eigil Knuth	For exploration in Northern Greenland ... and for his contributions to Eskimo archaeology
1952	H. W. Tilman	For exploratory work among the mountains of East Africa and Central Asia	Paul-Emile Victor	For contributions to Polar exploration and for his geophysical investigations of the Greenland Icecap
1951	Vivian E. Fuchs	For his contributions to Antarctic exploration and his research as leader of the survey 1948-50	Donald Thomson	For geographical exploration and studies in Arnhem land
1950	George F. Walpole	For contributions to the mapping of the Western Desert of Egypt	Harald Sverdrup	For contributions to polar exploration and for oceanographic investigations
1949	L. Dudley Stamp	For his work in organising the Land Utilisation Survey of Great Britain and his application of Geography to National planning	Hans Pettersson	For his leadership of the recent oceanographical cruise in the Albatross
1948	Wilfred Thesiger	For exploration of Arabian deserts.	Thomas Henry Manning	For exploration and survey work in the Arctic
1947	Martin Hotine	For research work in Air Survey ... and for his cartographic work	Daniel van der Meulen	For exploratory journeys in the Hadhramaut and his contributions to the geography of Southern Arabia
1946	Edward A. Glennie	For his work on geodesy in India and his contributions to mapping in the Far East	Henry A. Larsen, RCMP	For his achievement of the North West Passage from both west to east and east to west
1945	Charles Camsell	For his contributions to the geology of the North	Halford Mackinder	For his long and distinguished service in the advancement of the science of Geography
1944	No medals awarded			
1943	No medals awarded			
1942	Freya Stark	For her travels in the East and her account of them	Owen Lattimore	For his travels and studies in Central Asia
1941	P. A. Clayton	For his surveys in the Libyan desert, and his application of his experience to desert warfare.	Isaiah Bowman	For his travels in South America and for his great services to the science of Geography
1940	Harold Ingrams and Doreen Ingrams	For exploration and studies in the Hadhramaut	Alexander Glen	For his expeditions in Spitsbergen and North east Land
1939	Arthur Mortimer Champion	For his surveys of the Turkana Province (Kenya) and the volcanoes south of Lake Rudolf	Hans Ahlmann	For exploration and glaciological studies in the Arctic
1938	John Rymill	For the valuable scientific work of his British Grahamland Expedition	Eric Shipton	For his most distinguished record of mountain climbing
1937	C. G. Lewis	For surveys in Iraq, Syria and the Irrawaddy Delta, and for his work on the Afghan and Turco-Iraq Boundary Commissions	Lincoln Ellsworth	For his work in developing the technique of aerial navigation in the Polar regions, culminating in his successful flight across the Antarctic
1936	G. W. Murray	For explorations and surveys in the deserts of Sinai and Eastern Egypt, and his studies of the Badawin tribes	R. E. Cheesman	For explorations and surveys of the Blue Nile and Lake Tana
1935	R. A. Bagnold	For journeys in the Libyan Desert	Willi Rickmer Rickmers	For long-continued travels in the Caucasus, culminating in his leadership of the Alai-Pamir Russo-German Expedition in 1928
1934	Hugh Ruttledge	For his journeys in the Himalayas and his leadership of the Mount Everest Expedition, 1933	Ejnar Mikkelsen	For exploration in the Arctic and his work in Eskimo resettlement in Greenland
1933	J. M. Wordie	For work in Polar explorations	Erich von Drygalski	For researches in glaciology in the Arctic and Antarctic
1932	Henry George Watkins	For his work in the Arctic Regions, especially as leader of the British Arctic Air Route Expedition	The Duke of Spoleto	For work in the Himalaya
1931	Bertram Thomas	For geographical work in Arabia and his successful crossing of the Rub al Khali	Richard E. Byrd, USN	For his expedition to the Antarctic ... and for his flights over both North and South Poles.
1930	F. Kingdon-Ward	For geographical exploration, and work on botanical distribution in China and Tibet	Carsten E. Borchgrevink	For his pioneer Antarctic Expedition, which was first to winter in the Antarctic, to travel on the Ross Barrier and to obtain proof of its recession
1929	Francis Rennell Rodd	For his journeys in the Sahara and his studies of the Tuareg people	C. H. Karius	For his crossing in Papua from the Fly River to the Sepik
1928	Tom Longstaff	For long-continued geographical work in the Himalaya	G. H. Wilkins	For his many years’ systematic work in Polar Regions, culminating in his remarkable flight from Point Barrow to Spitsbergen
1927	Kenneth Mason	For his connection between the surveys of India and Russian Turkestan, and his leadership of the Shakshagam Expedition	Lauge Koch	For his very remarkable six years’ exploration of Northern Greenland
1926	E. F. Norton	For his distinguished leadership of the 1924 British Mount Everest Expedition and his ascent to 28,100 feet	Edgeworth David	For his work on the Funafuti atoll and for his leadership of the first ascent of Mount Erebus
1925	Charles G. Bruce	For lifelong geographical work in the exploration of the Himalaya ... and his leadership of the Mount Everest Expedition of 1922	A. F. R. Wollaston	For his journeys in Central Africa and Dutch New Guinea
1924	Ahmed Hassanein Bey	For his journey to Kufara and Darfur	Frank Wild	For his long services to Antarctic exploration.
1923	Knud Rasmussen	For exploration and research in the Arctic regions	Miles Cater Smith	For explorations in the unknown interior of Papua
1922	C. K. Howard-Bury	For his distinguished services in command of the Mount Everest Expedition	E. de Koven Leffingwell	For surveys and investigations on the coast of Northern Alaska
1921	Vilhjalmur Stefansson	For his distinguished services in the exploration of the Arctic Ocean	Robert Bourgeois (French)	For his long and eminent services to Geography and Geodesy
1920	H. St. John B. Philby	For his two journeys in South Central Arabia	Jovan Cvijic	For his distinguished studies of the geography of the Baltic Peninsula
1919	E. M. Jack	For his geographical work on the Western Front	William Davis	For his eminence in the development of Physical Geography
1918	Gertrude Bell	For her important explorations and travels in Asia Minor, Syria, Arabia and on the Euphrates	Jean Tilho	For his long-continued surveys and explorations in Northern Africa
1917	D. G. Hogarth	For explorations in Asiatic Turkey	C. G. Rawling	For explorations in Western Tibet and New Guinea
1916	Percy H. Fawcett	For his contributions to the mapping of South America	F. M. Bailey	For explorations on the border of India and Tibet ... and especially for tracing the course of the Tsang-po-Brahmaputra
1915	Douglas Mawson	For leading the Australian Antarctic Expedition which achieved highly important scientific results	Filippo de Filippi	For his great expedition to the Karakoram and Eastern Turkestan
1914	Albrecht Penck	For his advancement of almost every branch of scientific geography, and in particular his idea of an International map of the world on the millionth scale	Hamilton Rice	For his meritorious work on the head waters of the Orinoco and the Northern tributaries of the Amazon
1913	Not awarded	An inscribed casket was presented to Lady Scott containing the Patron's Medal and the Special Antarctic Medal awarded to her late husband.	E. A. Wilson (posthumous)	For his excellent work in the study of the zoology of the Antarctic ... and for his skill as an artist
1912	Charles Montagu Doughty	For his remarkable exploration in Northern Arabia, and for his classic work in which the results were described	Douglas Carruthers	For important expeditions to Ruwenzori, Turkestan, Arabia and Mongolia
1911	P. K. Kozloff	For explorations in the Gobi desert, Northern Tibet and Mongolia	J. B. Charcot	For his important expeditions to the Antarctic, during which he conducted investigations of high scientific value in geology, meteorology, magnetic conditions and biology
1910	H. H. Godwin-Austen	For geographical discoveries and surveys along the North-eastern frontier of India, especially his pioneer exploring in the Karakoram	William Speirs Bruce	For explorations in the Arctic and Antarctic
1909	M. A. Stein	For his extensive explorations in Central Asia, and in particular his archaeological work	M. G. Talbot	For the large amount of excellent survey work done by him on the Afghan frontier and in the Sudan
1908	Boyd Alexander	For his three years’ journey across Africa from the Niger to the Nile	The Prince of Monaco	For oceanographical studies off the coast of Spitsbergen
1907	Francisco Moreno	For extensive explorations in the Patagonian Andes	Roald Amundsen	For his daring voyage for the purposes of research in the region of the North Magnetic Pole, and for his first accomplishment by any vessel of the famous North-West Passage
1906	Alfred Grandidier	The veteran French savant who for forty years has devoted himself to the exploration of Madagascar, and for his monumental work on the island in 52 large quarto volumes	Robert Bell	Who during forty-five years of field work has mapped an immense area of Canada previously unknown
1905	Martin Conway	For explorations in the mountain regions of Spitsbergen	C. H. D. Ryder	For his survey of Yunnan and his work in connection with the Tibet Mission
1904	Harry Johnston	For his many valuable services towards the exploration of Africa	Robert Falcon Scott	For services as leader or the National Antarctic Expedition, and for his great sledge journey to 82° 17′ S
1903	Douglas Freshfield	In recognition of his valuable contributions to our knowledge of the Caucasus	Otto Sverdrup	For important discoveries in Jones Sound and for the important part he played as captain of the Fram during Nansen’s famous expedition
1902	Frederick Lugard	For persistent attention to African Geography	Percy Molesworth Sykes	For journeys in Persia and for the support given by him to native explorers
1901	The Duke of the Abruzzi	For his journey to the summit of Mount St Elias, and for his Arctic voyage in the Stella Polare	Donaldson Smith	For a memorable journey across the unknown parts of Lake Rudolf and the Omo

== Recipients (1832–1900) ==
Date	Founder's Medal	Contribution	Patron's Medal	Contribution
1900	H. H. P. Deasy	For exploring and survey work in Central Asia	James McCarthy	For great services to geographical science in exploring and mapping all parts of the kingdom of Siam
1899	G. L. Binger	For valuable work within the great bend of the Niger	Fernand Foureau	For continuous exploration in the Sahara
1898	Sven Hedin	For important exploring work in Central Asia	Robert E. Peary, USN	For explorations in Northern Greenland, and especially for discovering the northern termination of the Greenland ice
1897	P. Semenoff	For his long-continued efforts in promoting Russian exploration in Central Asia	George Mercer Dawson	For exploration in the North West Territories and Alaska
1896	William MacGregor	For services to geography in British New Guinea, in exploring, mapping and giving information on the natives	St. George Littledale	For important journeys in the Pamirs and Central Asia
1895	John Murray	For services to physical geography, especially oceanography, and for his work on board the Challenger	George Curzon	For travels and researches in Persia, French Indo-China, the Hindu Kush, and Pamirs
1894	H. Bower	For his remarkable journey across Tibet, from west to east	Elisée Reclus	For eminent services rendered to Geography as the author of La Nouvelle Géographie Universelle
1893	Frederick Selous	In recognition of twenty years' exploration and surveys in South Africa	William Woodville Rockhill	For his travels and explorations in Western China and Tibet
1892	Alfred Russel Wallace	The well-known naturalist and traveller and co-discoverer with Charles Darwin of the theory of natural selection, in recognition of the high geographical value of his great works	Edward Whymper	For his route-map and detailed survey among the Great Andes of the Equator
1891	James Hector	For investigations pursued as Naturalist to the Palliser expedition	Fridtjof Nansen	For having been first to cross the inland ice of Greenland ... as well as for his qualities as a scientific geographer
1890	Emin Pasha	For the great services he rendered to Geography during his twelve years' administration of the Equatorial Province of Egypt	F. E. Younghusband	For his journey from Manchuria and Pekin to Kashmir, and especially for his route-surveys and topographical notes
1889	A. D. Carey	For his remarkable journey in Central Asia during which he travelled 4,750 miles through regions never visited by an Englishman	G. Radde	For a life devoted to the promotion of Scientific Geography
1888	Clements R. Markham	In acknowledgment or the value or his numerous contributions to geographical literature ... on his retirement from the Secretaryship of the Society after 25 years' service	H. Wissmann	In recognition of his great achievements as an explorer in Central Africa
1887	T. H. Holdich	For zeal and devotion in carrying out surveys of Afghanistan	G. Grenfell	For extensive explorations in the Cameroons and Congo
1886	A. W. Greely	For having so considerably added to our knowledge of the shores of the Polar Sea and the interior of Grinnell Land	Guido Cora	For important services as a writer and cartographer
1885	Joseph Thomson	For his zeal, promptitude and success during two expeditions into East Central Africa	H. E. O’Neill	For his 13 journeys of exploration along the coast and into the interior of Mozambique
1884	A. R. Colquhoun	For his journey from Canton to the Irrawadi	Julius von Haast	For his extensive explorations in the Southern Island of New Zealand
1883	Joseph Hooker	For eminent services to scientific geography	E. Colborne Baber	For scientific works during his many exploratory journeys in the interior of China
1882	Gustav Nachtigal	For his journeys through the Eastern Sahara	John Kirk	For unremitting services to Geography, as a naturalist, as second-in-command to Livingstone, and as H.M.Consul-General at Zanzibar
1881	Serpa Pinto	For his journey across Africa ... during which he explored 500 miles of new country	Benjamin Leigh Smith	For important discoveries along the coast of Franz-Josef Land
1880	A. Louis Palander	For his services in connection with the Swedish Arctic Expeditions in the Vega	Ernest Giles	For his explorations and surveys in Australia
1879	N. Prejevalsky	For successive expeditions and route-surveys in Mongolia and the high plateau of Northern Tibet	N. W. J. Gill	For important work along the Northern frontier of Persia
1878	Ferdinand von Richthofen	For his extensive travels and scientific explorations in China	Henry Trotter	For services to Geography which resulted in the connection of the Trigonometrical Survey of India with Russian Surveys from Siberia
1877	George Nares	For having commanded the Arctic Expedition of 1875–6, during which ships and sledge parties reached a higher Northern latitude than had previously been attained	Nain Singh	For his great journeys and surveys in Tibet and along the Upper Brahmaputra, during which he determined the position of Lhasa and added largely to our knowledge of the map of Asia
1876	Verney Lovett Cameron	For his journey across Africa from Zanzibar to Benguela, and his survey of Lake Tanganyika	John Forrest	For his numerous successful explorations in Western Australia
1875	Karl Weyprecht	For his enterprise and ability in command of expeditions to Spitsbergen and Nova Zembla	Julius Payer	For explorations and discoveries in the Arctic regions
1874	Georg Schweinfurth	For his explorations in Africa	P. Egerton Warburton	For his successful journey across the previously unknown western interior of Australia
1873	Ney Elias	For his enterprise and ability in surveying the course of the Yellow River, and for his journey through Western Mongolia	Henry Morton Stanley	For his Relief of Livingstone, and for bringing his valuable journal and papers to England
1872	Henry Yule	For eminent services to geography	Robert B. Shaw	For journeys in Eastern Turkistan, and for his extensive astronomical and hypsometrical observations
1871	Roderick Murchison	Who for 40 years watched over the (Royal Geographical) Society with more than paternal solicitude, and has at length placed it among the foremost of our scientific societies	A. Keith Johnston	For distinguished services in the promotion of physical geography
1870	George W. Hayward	For his journey into Eastern Turkistan, and for reaching the Pamir Steppe	Francis Garnier	For his extensive surveys ... from Cambodia to the Yangtze-kiang ... and for bringing his expedition to safety after the death of his chief
1869	A. E. Nordenskiöld	For designing and carrying out the Swedish expeditions to Spitsbergen ... whereby great additions have been made to our acquittance with zoology, botany, geology and meteorology	Mary Somerville	Who throughout her very long life has been eminently distinguished by her proficiency in those branches of science which form the basis of Physical Geography
1868	Augustus Petermann	For his important services as a Writer and Cartographer	Gerhard Rohlfs	For his extensive travels in the interior of Northern Africa ... and especially for his traverse of the continent from Tripoli to Lagos
1867	Alexis Boutakoff	For being first to launch and navigate ships in the Sea of Aral ... and for his survey of the mouths of the Oxus	Isaac Hayes	For his expedition towards the open Polar Sea
1866	Thomas Thomson	For his researches in the Western Himalayas and Tibet	William Chandless	For his Survey of the River Purus in South America
1865	T. G. Montgomerie	For his great trigonometrical journey from the plains of the Punjab to the Karakoram Range	Samuel Baker	For his vigorous explorations in the interior of Africa
1864	J. A. Grant	For his journey across Eastern Equatorial Africa with Captain Speke	Carl von der Decken	For his geographical surveys of Kilimanjaro
1863	Francis Thomas Gregory	For successful explorations in Western Australia	John Arrowsmith	For the very important services (in cartography) he has rendered to geographical science
1862	Robert O'Hara Burke	In remembrance of that gallant explorer who with his companion Wills, perished after having traversed the continent of Australia	Thomas Blakiston	For his survey of the Yangtze-kiang
1861	John Hanning Speke	For his eminent geographical discoveries in Africa, and especially his discovery of the great lake Victoria Nyanza	John McDouall Stuart	For very remarkable explorations in the interior of Australia
1860	Lady Franklin	For self-sacrificing perseverance in sending out expeditions to ascertain the fate of her husband	Leopold McClintock	For the skill and fortitude displayed by him and his companion in their search for records of the lost [Franklin] expedition and for valuable coast surveys
1859	Richard Francis Burton	For his various exploratory enterprises, and especially for his perilous expedition with Captain. J. H. Speke to the great lakes in Eastern Africa	John Palliser	for the valuable results of his explorations in the Rocky Mountains of North America
1858	Richard Collinson	For discoveries in the Arctic Regions	Alexander Bache	For extensive and accurate surveys of America
1857	Augustus C. Gregory	For extensive and important explorations in Western and Northern Australia	Andrew Scott Waugh	For geodetical operations, as remarkable for their extent as for their accuracy, whereby [India] has been covered by triangulation
1856	Elisha Kent Kane	For services and discoveries in the Polar Regions during the American Expeditions in search of Sir John Franklin	Heinrich Barth	For his extensive explorations in Central Africa, his excursions about Lake Chad and his perilous journey to Timbuctu
1855	David Livingstone	For his recent explorations in Africa	Charles John Andersson	For travels in South Western Africa
1854	William Henry Smyth	For his valuable Maritime Surveys in the Mediterranean	Robert McClure	For his remarkable exertions ... in navigating his ship through the ice of the Polar Seas, and for his discovery of the North West Passage
1853	Francis Galton	For fitting out and conducting an expedition to explore the centre of Southern Africa	E. A. Inglefield	For his enterprising survey of the coasts of Baffin Bay, Smith Sound and Lancaster Sound
1852	John Rae	For his survey of Boothia under most severe privations ... and for his very important contributions to the Geography of the Arctic	Henry Strachey	For extensive explorations and surveys in Western Tibet
1851	George Wallin	For his interesting and important travels in Arabia	Thomas Brunner	For meritorious labours in exploring the Middle Island (South Island) of New Zealand
1850	Not awarded; a Chronometer Watch presented to David Livingstone	For his journey to the great lake of Ngami	John Charles Frémont of the U.S. Topographical Engineers	For his important geographical labours in the far West of the American Continent
1849	Austen Henry Layard	For important contributions to Asiatic Geography, interesting researches in Mesopotamia, and for his discovery of the remains of Nineveh	Charles von Hugel	For his enterprising exploration of Cashmere (Kashmir)
1848	James Brooke	For his expedition to Borneo, and the zeal he has shown in promoting geographical discovery	Charles Wilkes, USN	For the talent and perseverance he displayed in a voyage in the Antarctic regions ... and for splendid scientific work
1847	Charles Sturt	For explorations in Australia, and especially for his journey fixing the limit of Lake Torrens and penetrating into the heart of the continent to lat. 24° 30'S, long. 138° 0'E	Ludwig Leichhardt	For explorations in Australia, especially for his journey from Moreton Bay to Port Essington.
1846	P. E. de Strzelecki	For exploration in the south eastern portion of Australia	A. von Middendorff	For explorations in Northern and Eastern Siberia
1845	Charles Beke	For his exploration in Abyssinia	Carl Ritter	For his important geographical labours
1844	W. J. Hamilton	For valuable researches in Asia Minor	Adolph Erman	For important geographical labours in Siberia and Kamstchatka
1843	Edward John Eyre	For his enterprising and extensive explorations in Australia, under circumstances of peculiar difficulty	Lieut. John Frederick A. Symonds	For his triangulation over Palestine and for his determination of the difference between the level of the Mediterranean and the Dead Sea
1842	James Clark Ross	For his brilliant achievement at the South Pole, to within less than 12° of which he safely navigated his vessels, discovering a great Antarctic continent	Edward Robinson	For his valuable work Biblical Researches in Palestine, Mount Sinai and Arabia
1841	H. Raper	For excellent work on Practical Navigation and Nautical Astronomy	John Wood	For his journey to the source of the Oxus and for valuable labours on the Indus
1840	Henry Rawlinson	For researches in Persian Guayana	Robert H. Schomburgk	For his perseverance and success in exploring the territory and investigating the resources of British Guyana
1839	Thomas Simpson	For tracing the hitherto unexplored coast of North America	Eduard Rüppell	For his travels and researches in Nubia, Arabia and Abyssinia
1838	Francis Rawdon Chesney	For valuable materials in comparative and physical geography in Syria, Mesopotamia and the delta of Susiana		
1837	Robert Fitzroy	For his survey of the coasts of South America, from the Rio de la Plata to Guayaquil in Peru		
1836	George Back	For his recent discoveries in the Arctic, and his memorable journey down the Great Fish River		
1835	Alexander Burnes	For his remarkable and important journeys through Persia		
1834	John Ross	For his discovery of Boothia Felix and King William Land and for his famous sojourn of four winters in the Arctic		
1833	John Biscoe	For his discovery of Graham's Land and Enderby's Land in the Antarctic		
1832	Richard Lander	For important services in determining the course and termination of the Niger	First award	

== See also ==
- List of geography awards
- Gold medal awards
