= List of recipients of the Founder's Medal =

List of geography award winners

Founder's Medal
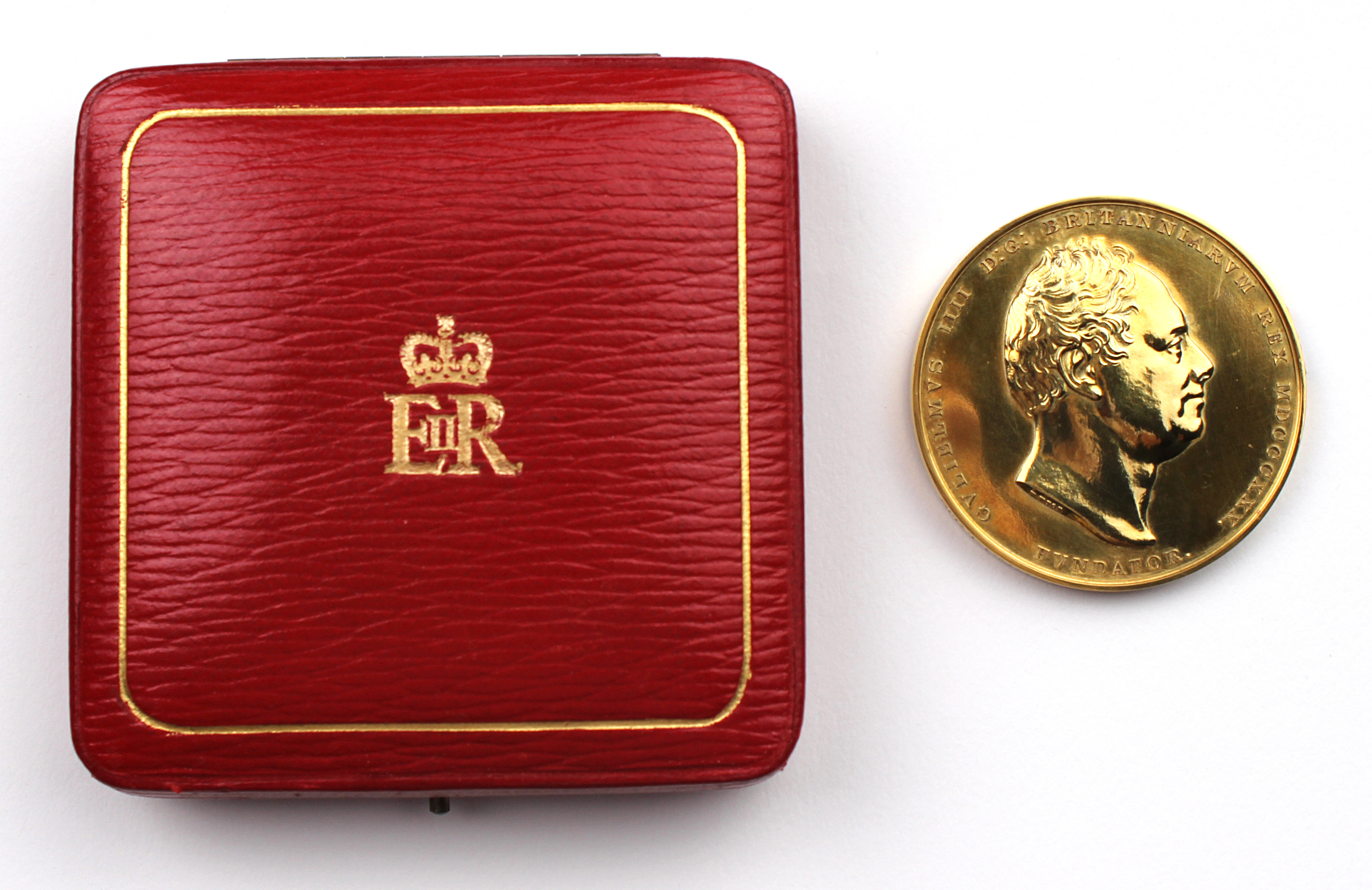
- Founder's Medal awarded to Kenneth Mason
- Awarded for: the encouragement and promotion of geographical science and discovery
- Sponsored by: Sovereign of the United Kingdom
- Country: United Kingdom
- Presented by: Royal Geographical Society
- Formerly called: Royal Premium
- First award: 1832

The Founder's Medal is a medal awarded annually by the Royal Geographical Society, upon approval of the Sovereign of the United Kingdom, to individuals for "the encouragement and promotion of geographical science and discovery".

== Foundation ==
From its foundation, the society received an annual grant from the Sovereign of the United Kingdom for awards with royal approval. The medal originated from an annual donation starting in 1831 of 50 guineas from King William IV. The award was instituted as the Royal Premium or Royal Award, an annual cash prize. In 1836, the society with agreement from King William IV, decided to allocate half of the premium to a 'Gold Medal'. This would be awarded by the Sovereign, on the advice of the Council of the Royal Geographical Society. Queen Victoria succeeded to the throne before the first gold medal, which was designed in coordination with King William IV, was awarded. Queen Victoria announced her intention of continuing the grant commenced by her uncle. The council ultimately decided to divide the grant into two gold medals of equal standing; the Founder's Medal in memory of the founding patron King William IV and the Patron's Medal with the image of Queen Victoria as the active royal patron of the society.

== Design ==
The medal, like the Patron's Medal, is a gold medallion designed by William Wyon, Chief Engraver of the Royal Mint. The obverse side has a portrait of William IV. The reverse side shows a figure of Britannia, wearing a helmet and standing by a sextant and globe. She is holding a wreath in her outstretched right hand and a map in the left. The name of the recipient is engraved on the edge of the medal. The medal was struck in gold until 1974. From 1975 onwards it has been struck in silver-gilt. Exceptionally, on account of wars, the medals of 1918−21 and 1940 were struck in bronze.

== Award history ==
While generally awarded annually, the Founder's Medal was not awarded in the years 1850, 1851, 1855, 1913, 1943 and 1944. In 1850, the Patron's Medal was awarded but instead of awarding a Founder's Medal the council presented David Livingstone with a chronometer watch for 'his journey to the great lake of Ngami'. In 1851, the council awarded no gold medals and instead awarded 25 guinea prizes to each of Georg August Wallin and Thomas Brunner. In 1855, the Patron's Medal was awarded but instead of awarding a Founder's Medal the council presented Charles John Andersson with a set of surveying instruments (containing a sextant and stand, artificial horizon, watch, thermometers and measuring tapes). Awarding a prize funded by the annual royal grant that was not a medal recognized the valuable work of the recipient while concurrently indicating "the service had not been of sufficient importance to justify the award of a gold medal, the highest award at the disposal of the society." In 1913, the Patron's Medal was awarded but instead of awarding a Founder's Medal the council presented an engraved casket to Kathleen Scott containing the Patron's Medal and the Special Antarctic Medal awarded to her late husband Robert Falcon Scott. No awards were made in 1943 or 1944 on account of the Second World War.

== List of recipients ==
Year	Name	Image	Description	Award Rationale
1832	Richard Lemon Lander		Cornish explorer	For the discovery of the course of the River Niger or Quorra, and its outlets in the Gulf of Benin
1833	John Biscoe		English mariner and explorer	For the discovery of the land now named "Enderby's Land" and "Graham's Land" in the Antarctic Ocean
1834	John Ross		Scottish Royal Navy officer and polar explorer	For his discovery of Boothia Felix and King William Land and for his famous sojourn of four winters in the Arctic
1835	Alexander Burnes		Explorer, political officer in British India (1805-1841)	For his remarkable and important journeys through Persia
1836	George Back		British Royal Navy admiral (1796–1878)	For his recent discoveries in the Arctic, and his memorable journey down the Great Fish River
1837	Robert Fitzroy		English Vice-Admiral of the Royal Navy and scientist (1805–1865)	For his survey of the coasts of South America, from the Rio de la Plata to Guayaquil in Peru
1838	Francis Rawdon Chesney		British Army general	For valuable materials in comparative and physical geography in Syria, Mesopotamia and the delta ofSusiana
1839	Thomas Simpson		Scottish arctic explorer	For tracing the hitherto unexplored coast to the west between Return Reef and point Barrow, in 1837; and during the past year has discovered 90 miles of coast eastward from Point Turnagain of Franklin, on the northern shore of America.
1840	Sir Henry Rawlinson, 1st Baronet		British politician (1810-1895)	l for his travels and researches in Susiana and Persian Kurdistan, and for the light thrown by hom on the comparative geography of Western Asia.
1841	Henry Raper		British Royal Navy officer (1799-1859)	For excellent work on Practical Navigation and Nautical Astronomy
1842	James Clark Ross		British explorer and naval officer (1800–1862)	For his brilliant achievement at the South Pole, to within less than 12° of which he safely navigated hisvessels, discovering a great Antarctic continent
1843	Edward John Eyre		British explorer and colonial administrator (1815–1901)	For his enterprising and extensive explorations in Australia, under circumstances of peculiar difficulty
1844	William John Hamilton		British geologist (1805-1867)	For valuable researches in Asia Minor
1845	Charles Tilstone Beke		British geographer	For his exploration in Abyssinia
1846	Paweł Strzelecki		Polish explorer and geologist	For exploration in the south eastern portion of Australia
1847	Charles Sturt		Australian explorer (1795-1869)	For explorations in Australia, and especially for his journey fixing the limit of Lake Torrens and penetrating into the heart of the continent to lat. 24° 30'S, long. 138° 0'E
1848	James Brooke		White Rajah of Sarawak (1803-1868)	For his expedition to Borneo, and the zeal he has shown in promoting geographical discovery
1849	Austen Henry Layard		British politician (1817–1894)	For important contributions to Asiatic Geography, interesting researches in Mesopotamia, and for his discovery of the remains of Nineveh
1852	John Rae		Scottish explorer (1813-1893)	For his survey of Boothia undermost severe privations and for his very important contributions to the Geography of the Arctic
1853	Francis Galton		English polymath: geographer, statistician, eugenicist	For fitting out and conducting in Expedition to explore the centre of Southern Africa
1854	William Henry Smyth		English naval officer and hydrographer (1788-1865)	For his valuable Maritime Surveys in the Mediterranean
1856	Elisha Kent Kane		American explorer and military medical officer	For services and discoveries in the Polar Regions during the American Expeditions in search of Sir JohnFranklin
1857	Augustus Charles Gregory		Australian explorer (1819-1905)	For extensive and important explorations in Western and Northern Australia
1858	Richard Collinson		British Royal Navy admiral (1811-1883)	For discoveries in the Arctic Regions
1859	Richard Francis Burton		British explorer, geographer, translator, writer, soldier, orientalist, cartographer, ethnologist, spy, linguist, poet, fencer, and diplomat	For his various exploratory enterprises, and especially for his perilous expedition with Captain. J. H. Speke to the great lakes in Eastern Africa
1860	Jane Franklin		British explorer	For self-sacrificing perseverance in sending out expeditions to ascertain the fate of her husband
1861	John Hanning Speke		British military officer and explorer	For his eminent geographical discoveries in Africa, and especially his discovery of the great lake Victoria Nyanza
1862	Robert O'Hara Burke		Australian explorer	In remembrance of that gallant explorer who with his companion Wills, perished after having traversed the continent of Australia
1863	Francis Thomas Gregory		English-born Australian explorer and politician (1821–1888)	For successful explorations in Western Australia
1864	James Augustus Grant		Scottish explorer and collector (1827 – 1892)	For his journey across Eastern Equatorial Africa with Captain Speke
1865	Thomas George Montgomerie		English surveyor who worked in India (1830-1878)	For his great trigonometrical journey from the plains of the Punjab to the Karakoram Range
1866	Thomas Thomson		Scottish doctor and botanist (1817-1878)	For his researches in the Western Himalayas and Thibet
1867	Aleksei Butakov		Russian admiral and explorer	For being first to launch and navigate ships in the Sea of Aral and for his survey of the mouths of the Oxus
1868	August Heinrich Petermann		German cartographer (1822-1878)	For his important services as a Writer and Cartographer and Science, and for his well-known publication the Geographische Mitteilungen which for twelve years has greatly aided the process of Geography.
1869	Adolf Erik Nordenskiöld		Finland Swedish baron, geologist, mineralogist and Arctic explorer (1832–1901)	For designing and carrying out the Swedish expeditions to Spitzbergen ... whereby great additions havebeen made to our acquitance with zoology, botany, geology and meteorology
1870	George W. Hayward		British explorer	For his journey into Eastern Turkistan, and for reaching the Pamir Steppe
1871	Roderick Murchison, 1st Baronet		geologist (1792-1871)	Who for 40 years watched over the Society with more than paternal solicitude, and has at length placed it among the foremost of our scientific Societies
1872	Henry Yule		Scottish orientalist	For eminent services to Geography
1873	Ney Elias		British explorer (1844-1897)	For his enterprise and ability in surveying the course of the Yellow River, and for his journey through Western Mongolia
1874	Georg August Schweinfurth		German explorer and scientist (1836-1925)	For his explorations in Africa
1875	Carl Georg Ludwig Wilhelm Weyprecht		Austrian explorer (1838-1881)	For his enterprise and ability in command of expeditions to Spitzbergen and Nova Zembla
1876	Verney Lovett Cameron		traveller from England	For his journey across Africa from Zanzibar to Benguela, and his survey of Lake Tanganyika
1877	George Nares		British naval officer and Arctic explorer (1831-1915)	For having commanded the Arctic Expedition of 1875/6, during which ships and sledge parties reached a higher Northern latitude than had previously been attained
1878	Ferdinand von Richthofen		German traveller, geographer and scientist (1833-1905)	For his extensive travels and scientific explorations in China
1879	Nikolay Przhevalsky		Russian soldier, explorer, & geographer (1839-1888)	For successive expeditions and route-surveys in Mongolia and the high plateau of Northern Tibet
1880	Louis Palander		Swedish admiral	For his services in connection with the Swedish Arctic Expeditions in the Vega
1881	Alexandre de Serpa Pinto		Portuguese explorer and soldier	For his journey across Africa during which he explored 500 miles of new country
1882	Gustav Nachtigal		German explorer of Central and West Africa	For his journeys through the Eastern Sahara
1883	Joseph Dalton Hooker		British botanist, lichenologist, and surgeon (1817–1911)	For eminent services to scientific Geography
1884	Archibald Ross Colquhoun		Rhodesian politician (1848-1914)	For his journey from Canton to the Irrawadi
1885	Joseph Thomson		Scottish geologist and explorer	For his zeal, promptitude and success during two expeditions into East Central Africa
1886	Adolphus Greely		American army officer and polar explorer	For having so considerably added to our knowledge of the shores of the Polar Sea and the interior of Grinnell Land
1887	Thomas Holdich		English geographer, writer and soldier; surveyed the Indian frontier, and Chilean-Argentine border	For zeal and devotion in carrying out surveys of Afghanistan
1888	Clements Markham		British geographer (1830-1916)	In acknowledgment or the value or his numerous contributions to geographical literature ... on his retirement from the Secretaryship of the Society after 25 years’ service
1889	Arthur Douglas Carey		British traveller in Central Asia (?-1936)	For his remarkable journey in Central Asia during which he travelled 4750 miles through regions never visited by an Englishman
1890	Emin Pasha		German colonial governor (1840-1892)	For the great services he rendered to Geography during his twelve years’ administration of the Equatorial Province of Egypt
1891	James Hector		Scottish born New Zealand geologist, naturalist, and surgeon (1834-1907)	For investigations pursued as Naturalist to the Palliser expedition
1892	Alfred Russel Wallace		British naturalist, explorer, geographer, anthropologist and biologist (1823-1913)	The well-known naturalist and traveller and co-discoverer with Charles Darwin of the theory of natural selection, in recognition of the high geographical value of his great works
1893	Frederick Selous		British explorer, officer, hunter, and conservationist	In recognition of twenty years’ exploration and surveys in South Africa
1894	Hamilton Bower		British general	For his remarkable journey across Tibet, from west to east
1895	John Murray		Scottish oceanographer, marine biologist and limnologist	For services to physical Geography, especially oceanography, and for his work on board the Challenger
1896	William MacGregor		British colonial governor and administrator (1846-1919)	For services to Geography in British New Guinea, in exploring, mapping and giving information on the natives
1897	Pyotr Semyonov-Tyan-Shansky		Russian geographer, art collector and statistician (1827-1914)	For his long-continued efforts in promoting Russian exploration in Central Asia
1898	Sven Hedin		Swedish geographer, topographer, explorer, photographer, travel writer and illustrator (1865-1952)	For important exploring work in Central Asia
1899	Louis Gustave Binger		French explorer (1856-1936)	For valuable work within the great bend of the Niger
1900	Henry Hugh Peter Deasy		British Army officer and businessman (1866-1947)	For exploring and survey work in Central Asia
1901	Prince Luigi Amedeo, Duke of the Abruzzi		Italian explorer	For his journey to the summit of Mount St. Elias, and for his Arctic voyage in the Stella Polare
1902	Frederick Lugard, 1st Baron Lugard		British colonial administrator (1858-1945)	For persistent attention to African Geography
1903	Douglas William Freshfield		British lawyer, mountaineer and author	In recognition of his valuable contributions to our knowledge of the Caucasus
1904	Harry Johnston		British explorer, botanist, linguist and colonial administrator (1858-1927)	For his many valuable services towards the exploration of Africa
1905	Martin Conway, 1st Baron Conway of Allington		British politician (1856-1937)	For explorations in the mountain regions of Spitsbergen
1906	Alfred Grandidier		French naturalist and explorer	The veteran French savant who for forty years has devoted himself to the exploration of Madagascar, and for his monumental work on the island in 52 large quarto volumes
1907	Francisco Moreno		Argentinian explorer and naturalist (1852–1919)	For extensive explorations in the Patagonian Andes
1908	Boyd Alexander		British Army officer, explorer and ornithologist (1873-1910)	For his three years’ journey across Africa from the Niger to the Nile
1909	Aurel Stein		Hungarian-British archaeologist (1862-1943)	For his extensive explorations in Central Asia, and in particular his archaeological work
1910	Henry Haversham Godwin-Austen		English geologist, topographer and surveyor	For geographical discoveries and surveys along the North-eastern frontier of India, especially his pioneerexploring in the Karakoram
1911	Pyotr Kozlov		Russian explorer	For explorations in the Gobi desert, Northern Tibet and Mongolia
1912	Charles Montagu Doughty		British poet (1843-1926)	For his remarkable exploration in Northern Arabia, and for his classic work in which the results weredescribed
1914	Albrecht Penck		German geologist and geographer	For his advancement of almost every branch of scientific geography, and in particular his idea of anInternational map of the world on the millionth scale
1915	Douglas Mawson		Australian geologist and explorer of the Antarctic (1882-1958)	For his conduct of the Australian Antarctic Expedition which achieved highly important scientific results
1916	Percy Fawcett		British explorer, anthropologist and archaeologist	For his contributions to the mapping of South America
1917	David George Hogarth		British archaeologist (1862-1927)	For explorations in Asiatic Turkey
1918	Gertrude Bell		English writer, traveller, political officer, archaeologist (1868-1926)	For her important explorations and travels in Asia Minor, Syria, Arabia and on the Euphrates
1919	Evan Maclean Jack		British cartographer (1873-1951)	For his geographical work on the Western Front
1920	St John Philby		English Arabist, explorer, writer, and British colonial office intelligence officer	For his two journeys in South Central Arabia
1921	Vilhjalmur Stefansson		Canadian-born explorer (1879–1962)	For his distinguished services in the exploration of the Arctic Ocean
1922	Charles Howard-Bury		British soldier, explorer, botanist and Conservative politician (1883-1963)	For his distinguished services in command of the Mount Everest Expedition
1923	Knud Rasmussen		Danish explorer and anthropologist	For exploration and research in the Arctic regions
1924	Ahmed Hassanein Pasha		رئيس الديوان الملكي سابقاً Egyptian politician and geographic explorer	For his journey to Kufra and Darfur
1925	Charles Granville Bruce		British mountain climber	For lifelong geographical work in the exploration of the Himalaya and his leadership of the Mount Everest Expedition of 1922
1926	Edward Felix Norton		British army officer and mountaineer	For his distinguished leadership of the Mount Everest Expedition, 1924, and his ascent to 28,100 feet
1927	Kenneth Mason		British geographer	For his connection between the surveys of India and Russian Turkestan, and his leadership of the Shakshagam Expedition
1928	Tom George Longstaff		British explorer (1875-1964)	For long-continued geographical work in the Himalaya
1929	Francis Rodd, 2nd Baron Rennell		British Army general (1895-1978)	For his journeys in the Sahara and his studies of the Tuareg people
1930	Frank Kingdon-Ward		British botanist (1885-1958)	For geographical exploration, and work on botanical distribution in China and Tibet
1931	Bertram Thomas		Civil servant and explorer	For geographical work in Arabia and his successful crossing of the Rub al Khali
1932	Gino Watkins		British Arctic explorer	For his work in the Arctic Regions, especially as leader of the British Arctic Air Route Expedition
1933	James Wordie		Scottish polar explorer	For work in Polar explorations
1934	Hugh Ruttledge		British colonial administrator	For his journeys in the Himalayas and his leadership of the Mount Everest Expedition, 1933
1935	Ralph Alger Bagnold		British Army officer (1896-1990)	For journeys in the Libyan Desert
1936	George W. Murray		surveyor (1885-1966), working in Egypt	For explorations and surveys in the deserts of Sinai and Eastern Egypt, and his studies of the Badawin tribes
1937	Clinton Gresham Lewis		surveyor (1885-1978)	For surveys in Iraq, Syria and the Irrawaddy Delta, and for his work on the Afghan and Turco-Iraq Boundary Commissions
1938	John Rymill		Australian explorer (1905–1968)	For the valuable scientific work of his British Grahamland Expedition
1939	Arthur Mortimer Champion		surveyor and administrator in British Kenya (1885-1950)	For his surveys of the Turkana Province (Kenya) and the volcanoes south of lake Rudolf
1940	Doreen Ingrams		Ingrams [née Shortt], Doreen Constance (1906–1997), actress and traveller	For exploration and studies in the Hadhramaut
1940	Harold Ingrams		British colonial official (1897-1973)	For exploration and studies in the Hadhramaut
1941	Pat Clayton		British intelligence officer	For his surveys in the Libyan desert, and his application of his experience to desert warfare.
1942	Freya Madeline Stark		British travel writer (1893-1993)	For her travels in the East and her account of them
1945	Charles Camsell		Canadian politician and geologist (1876-1958)	For his contributions to the geology of the North
1946	Edward Aubrey Glennie			For his work on geodesy in India and his contributions to mapping in the Far East
1947	Martin Hotine		British Army officer (1898-1968)	For research work in Air Survey and for his cartographic work
1948	Wilfred Thesiger		British explorer (1910-2003)	For contributions to the Geography of Southern Arabia and for his crossing of the Rub al Khali desert
1949	Laurence Dudley Stamp		British geographer (1898-1966)	For his work in organising the Land Utilisation Survey of Great Britain and his application of Geography to National planning
1950	George F. Walpole		director of the Department of Lands and Survey, Jordan	For contributions to the mapping of the Western Desert of Egypt
1951	Vivian Fuchs		British explorer	For his contributions to Antarctic exploration and his research as leader of the survey 1948-50
1952	Bill Tilman		British explorer	For exploratory work among the mountains of East Africa and Central Asia
1953	Patrick Douglas Baird		glaciologist (1912-1984)	For explorations in the Canadian Arctic
1954	John Hunt, Baron Hunt		British mountaineer, explorer and army officer (1910-1998)	Leader of the British Mount Everest Expedition
1955	John Kirtland Wright		American geographer	For services in the development of geographical research and exploration
1956	John Schjelderup Giæver		Norwegian writer	Leader of the Norwegian-British-Swedish Antarctic Expedition, for contributions to Polar exploration
1957	Ardito Desio		Italian explorer	For geographical exploration and surveys in the Himalayas
1958	Paul Siple		American explorer (1908-1968)	For contributions to Antarctic exploration and research
1959	William Anderson		United States naval officer	For the first trans-Polar submarine voyage in command of USS Nautilus
1960	Phillip Law		Australian scientist and explorer	For Antarctic exploration and research
1961	Mikhail Somov		Soviet oceanographer and polar explorer	For Antarctic exploration and research
1962	Edwin McDonald		United States Navy captain	For coastal explorations in the Bellingshausen Sea (Antarctica)
1963	Jacques Cousteau		French Naval Officer who co-invented open circuit demand scuba	For underwater exploration and research
1964	Louis Leakey		British archaeologist and naturalist	For palaeographical exploration and discoveries in East Africa
1965	Fred Roots		geologist and explorer (1923–2016)	For Polar exploration and research, with special reference to the Canadian Arctic
1966	Edred John Henry Corner		English botanist and mycologist (1906-1996)	For botanical exploration in North Borneo and the Solomon Islands
1967	Cláudio Villas-Bôas		Brazilian sertanista (1916-1998)	For contributions to exploration and development in the Mato Grosso
1967	Orlando Villas Bôas		Brazilian anthropologist	For contributions to exploration and development in the Mato Grosso
1968	W. Brian Harland		British geologist (1917-2003)	For Arctic exploration and research
1969	Rodolfo Panzarini		naval officer and Antarctic explorer	For services to Antarctic exploration and research and to international co-operation in Antarctic science
1970	Wally Herbert		British polar explorer (1934-2007)	For Arctic and Antarctic exploration and surveys
1971	George Deacon		British oceanographer and chemist (1906-1984)	For oceanographical research and exploration
1972	George Stephen Ritchie		Royal Navy admiral (1914-2012)	For hydrographical charting and oceanographical exploration
1973	Norman Falcon		British geologist (1904-1996)	Leader, the RGS’s Musandam [North Oman] Expedition. For contributions to the geographical history of thePersian Gulf region
1974	Chris Bonington		British mountaineer	For mountain explorations
1975	Laurence Kirwan		British archaeologist and geographer	For contributions to the geographical history of the Nubian Nile valley and Eastern Africa, and for services toexploration
1976	Brian Birley Roberts		polar expert and ornithologist (1912-1978)	For Polar exploration, and for contributions to Antarctic research and political negotiation
1977	Michael John Wise		geographer (1918-2015)	For economic Geography, and for his contributions to international understanding in geographical teaching
1978	Reginald Llewellyn Brown		British military officer and surveyor, Director-General of the Ordnance Survey (1895-1983)	For services to the science of map-making
1979	David Stoddart		geographer	For contributions to geomorphology, the study of coral reefs and the history of academic Geography
1980	William Richard Mead		British geographer (1915-2014)	
1981	Keith John Miller		mechanical engineer, explorer and mountaineer (1932-2006)	
1982	Michael Ward		British surgeon and mountaineer (1925-2005)	For high-altitude medical research and leadership of the British Mount Kongur Expedition
1983	Peter Scott		British ornithologist, conservationist, painter, naval officer and sportsman (1909-1989)	
1984	Ranulph Fiennes		British explorer (born 1944)	
1985	David Attenborough		British broadcaster and naturalist	
1986	Tim Severin		British explorer, historian, writer (1940-2020)	
1987	Anthony Seymour Laughton		British oceanographer	
1988	Peter Hall		town planner, urbanist and geographer (1932-2014)	
1989	Monica Kristensen Solås		Norwegian explorer	
1990	John Hemming		Canadian explorer	
1991	Andrew Goudie		British geographer	
1992	Alan Wilson		British mathematician and geographer	For contributions to the study of urban and regional systems.
1993	Kenneth J. Gregory		British geographer (1938–2020)	For contributions to hydrology and geomorphology.
1994	Ronald Urwick Cooke		British geographer	for contribution to geomorphology.
1995	Gathorne Gathorne-Hardy, 5th Earl of Cranbrook		zoologist, environmental biologist and author (1933-), chairman of the Institute for European Environmental Policy	
1996	John Woods		British oceanographer	for contributions to oceanography
1997	Tony Wrigley		British historical demographer	
1998	Robert J. Bennett		economic geographer (1948-)	
1999	Mike Kirkby		British geographer	For contributions to the development of processed-based and modelling approaches in geomorphology
2000	Brian Robson		geographer at the University of Manchester	For contributions to urban geography and geographical perspectives to urban policy
2001	William L. Graf		American geographer (1947-2019)	For contributions to research on dryland river processes, and the interactions of science and public policy
2002	Bruno Messerli		Swiss geographer and university professor (1931-2019)	For contributions to mountain research and the public awareness of mountain issues
2003	Michael Frank Goodchild		professor of geographic information science	For contributions to geographical information science
2004	Leszek Starkel		Polish geographer	For advancing international understanding of palaeohydrology and geomorphology
2005	Nicholas Shackleton		British geologist (1937-2006)	For research on Quaternary palaeoclimatology
2006	Derek Gregory		British geographer	For international leadership of research in human geography and social theory
2007	Roger G. Barry		British-born American climatologist and geographer (1935-2018)	For international leadership of research on climate and climate change
2008	Julian A. Dowdeswell		British glaciologist	For the encouragement, development and promotion of glaciology
2009	Alan R. H. Baker		Geographer at the University of Cambridge (1938-)	For contributions to historical geography
2010	Diana Liverman		geographer and science writer	For encouraging, developing and promoting understanding of the human dimensions of climate change
2011	David N. Livingstone		British academic	For the encouragement and promotion of historical geography
2012	Charles W. J. Withers		Scottish linguist and geographer	For the encouragement and development of historical and cultural geography
2013	Keith S. Richards		geographer at the University of Cambridge	For the encouragement and development of physical geography and fluvial geomorphology
2014	Geoffrey Boulton		British geologist	For the development and promotion of glaciology
2015	Michael Batty		British academic	For development and promotion of the geographical science of cities
2016	Michael Storper		economic and urban geographer	For scholarship and leadership in human and economic geography
2017	Gordon Conway		British ecologist	For the enhancement and promotion of agricultural development in Asia and Africa
2018	Paul Rose		British explorer and TV presenter	For scientific expeditions and enhancing public understanding
2019	Trevor J. Barnes		Canadian geographer	For sustained excellence and pioneering developments in the field of economic geography
2020	Heather A. Viles		geographer	For her excellence in establishing the field of biogeomorphology
2021	Andy Eavis		speleologist & mining engineer	For significant contribution in leading speleological expeditions, exploring and recording some of the largest caves in the world for over 50 years
2022	David Hempleman-Adams		British industrialist and adventurer	For enabling science through expeditions, and inspiring younger generations of geographers
2023	Andrew W. Mitchell		zoologist	For his lifetime’s contribution to protect tropical rainforests and combat climate change
2024	Vanessa Lawrence		British geographer	For outstanding contributions to the promotion of geography in the UK and internationally

In 2025, media said that Børge Ousland will be getting the prize for 2025.
