= Ethel Tawse Jollie =

Rhodesian politician (1874–1950)

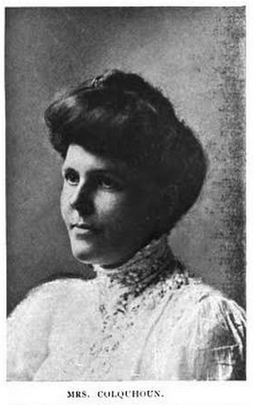
Ethel Colquhoun, from a 1907 publication.

Ethel Maud Tawse Jollie OBE (8 March 1874 – 21 September 1950; née Cookson; widowed Colquhoun) was a writer and political activist in Southern Rhodesia who was the first female parliamentarian in the British overseas empire.

== Career ==
Cookson was born Ethel Maude Cookson in Castle Church, Stafford, the daughter of Samuel Cookson, a doctor. She studied art under Anthony Ludovici at the Slade School of Fine Art where she met her first husband, explorer Archibald Ross Colquhoun. They married at St. Paul's church, Stafford, on 8 March 1900, and she accompanied her husband on tours across Asia, the Pacific, and Africa, before settling in Southern Rhodesia. After Colquhoun's death on 18 December 1914, she replaced him as editor of United Empire magazine. She later remarried a Rhodesian farmer called John Tawse Jollie.

Tawse Jollie was one of the front figures in the campaign for Rhodesian self-rule, founding the Responsible Government Association in 1917. She was a leading member of the National Service League, the Imperial Maritime League, the British Women's Emigration Society, the Women's Unionist Association, and the Southern Rhodesian Legislative Council. Ethel Tawse Jollie was an avowed anti-suffragist and anti-feminist. She died in Salisbury, Southern Rhodesia, on 21 September 1950.

Jollie was a supporter of white supremacy, albeit she later came to view blacks as equal to whites. In 1937, she said Africans had to be integrated into a "composite civilisation", but was never a supporter of full integration.

"So far as political evolution goes, we may not be at the end of our own history. Under present conditions political or social equality would not be accepted by the white race and could not be exercised by the black one with any degree of advantage to themselves, but permutations and combinations may open out a compromise as yet unforeseen."

== Works ==
- Two on their Travels, ⁣ William Heinemann, 1902.
- The Whirlpool of Europe, with Archibald R. Colquhoun, Dodd, Mead & Company, 1907.
- The Vocation of Woman, Macmillan & Co., Ltd., 1913.
- Our Just Cause; Facts about the War for Ready Reference, William Heinemann, 1914.
- The Real Rhodesia, Hutchinson & Co., 1924.
- Native Administration in Southern Rhodesia, Royal Society of Arts, 1935

=== Articles ===
- ” On Some Overseas Poetry," United Empire, Vol. I, 1909/1910.
- "The Husband of Madame de Boigne," The Nineteenth Century, Vol. LXVII, January/June 1910.
- "Feminism and Education," The University Magazine, Vol. XII, 1913.
- "Woman and Morality," The Nineteenth Century, Vol. LXXV, January 1914.
- "The Superfluous Woman: Her Cause and Cure," The Living Age, Vol. LXIII, April/June 1914.
- "Archibald Colquhoun: A Memoir," United Empire, Vol. VI, 1915/1916.
- "As Others See Us," United Empire, Vol. VI, 1915/1916.
- "The Balkan States and the War," United Empire, Vol. VI, 1915/1916.
- "Some Humours of Housekeeping in Rhodesia," Blackwood's Magazine, Vol. CC, July/December 1916.
- "Modern Feminism and Sex Antagonism," The Lotus Magazine, Vol. 9, No. 2, November 1917; Part II, Vol. 9, No. 3, December 1917.
- "Woman-Power and the Empire," United Empire, Vol. VIII, 1917/1918.
- "Germany and Africa," United Empire, Vol. IX, 1918/1919.
- "Rhodesia and the Union," United Empire, Vol. X, 1919/1920.
- "The Question of Southern Rhodesia," United Empire, Vol. XI, 1920.
- "The Future of Rhodesia," United Empire, Vol. XII, 1921.
- "Britain's New Colony," United Empire, Vol. XIV, 1923.

Southern Rhodesian Legislative Council
Preceded by Lionel Cripps	Member for Eastern; 1920–1924	Council abolished
Southern Rhodesian Legislative Assembly
New constituency	Member of Parliament for Umtali; 1924–1928; Served alongside: Charles Eickhoff	Constituency abolished
