= Archibald Colquhoun =

Archibald Colquhoun may refer to:

- Archibald Colquhoun (politician) (1756–1820), Scottish politician and lawyer
- Archibald Colquhoun (translator) (1912–1964), translator of modern Italian literature into English
- A. R. Colquhoun (Archibald Ross Colquhoun, 1848–1914), British explorer
