= Tropical geography =

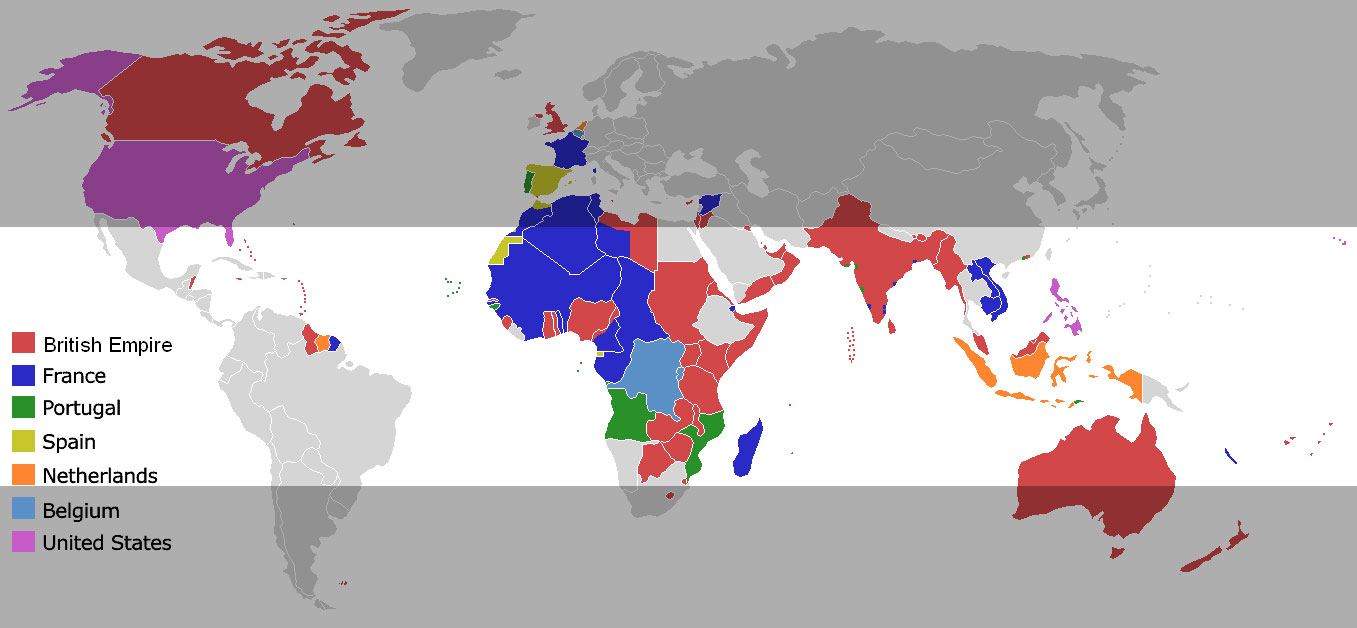
Map showing the colonial statuses of the world in 1945 with the intertropical zone highlighted.

Tropical geography refers to the study of places and people in the tropics. When it first emerged as a discipline, tropical geography was closely associated with imperialism and colonial expansion of the European empires as contributing scholars tended to portray the tropical places as "primitive" and people "uncivilised" and "inferior". A wide range of subjects has been discussed within the sub-field during late 18th to early 20th century including zoology, climatology, geomorphology, economics and cultural studies.

The discipline is now more commonly known as development geography as colonization had been replaced by economic development as the main ideological driver of international and global interactions since the 1950s. Today, many scholars continue to use the term tropical geography to contest the determinism embedded in the term and de-exoticise the tropical countries and their inhabitants.

== Origins ==
The origins of tropical geography can be traced back to as early as the fifteenth century when Columbus first discovered the Caribbean islands in tropical America. Subsequent writings of European explorers, merchants, naturalists, colonists and settlers who traveled to and lived in the tropics were the main sources of the study.

Alexander von Humboldt, Joseph Dalton Hooker, Charles Darwin and Alfred Russel Wallace are some of the significant contributors. It is argued that it is due to their academic reputation and scientific approaches tropical geography was consolidated into an academic discipline widely studied in Europe in spite of the region's vast differences in vegetation, wild lives, climate, geology and culture.

== Troubled Representations ==
The discourse on the tropics and their inhabitants have evolved over time in response to changing patterns of Europe's engagements in the tropics.

A variety of environmental determinism emerged from the sub-field as colonists and naturalists started representing temperate and tropical people with binaries like "progressive vs. backward," "civilised vs. primitive," "hard working vs. lazy" and "superior vs. inferior." Race, an invented concept, was convenient and readily applied in attempts to "[link] climatic variation closely to the supposed division of the human species into different 'races'".

As activities of the European empires diversified in the 19th century, travelers and settlers who had experienced deadly tropical diseases and conflicts with the local peoples forged another representation of the tropical world as a place full of "dangers" and "horrors" to mankind. The fertile lands of the tropics were then interpreted as to have obstacles for human morality and physical well-being preventing their inhabitants from technical, philosophical and artistic innovation. This dramatized and pessimistic representation reinforced Europe's superior position and enhanced the depiction of the tropics as an exotic other to the temperate world.

Whether tropical geographers found the tropical places and people abundant and dynamic or deadly and barbaric, they understood them as inferior to the temperate and great Western civilizations. As criticized by Edward Said in his famous work Orientalism, the literature of tropical geography served the interests of European scholars who were living in the temperate world to create an exotic other which in turn helped define themselves.

== Today's tropical geography ==
Until the mid 20th century, the imperialist, racist and Euro-centric version of tropical geography was still flourishing as influential works were still being published like Les Pays Tropicaux by geomorphologist Pierre Gourou. From 1950's onward, development geography replaced tropical geography as the sub-field of geography. Consequently, the studied regions were given new terminologies such as the "Third World" and the "global South."

Critical geographers argue the replacement of tropical geography by development geography marks the historical turning point of international intervention strategy from colonisation to economic development. Though morphed into a different discipline, the ideological roots of tropical geography—superiority, progress, civilization and technological advancement of the West which originated and matured in the temperate zone—carry on and become the building blocks of mainstream economic development theories.

Paralleled with the rise of critical approaches to other sub-fields of geography, development geography and tropical geography as academic disciplines saw a movement away from the mainstream economistic and deterministic view of the tropical world beginning in the 1970s. Geographers now attend to the influences imperialism, racism and Euro-centrism have had on tropical geography while attempting to bring class, gender, race and religion into the broader picture to better understand the tropical world and its inhabitants.

The academic journal Singapore Journal of Tropical Geography is a forum that tropical geographers use to introduce and present new research and critique existing literature on the tropical world and people. Contrary to the historic absence of voices from the tropics in such discussions, now many of the contributors of the Singapore Journal of Tropical Geography are of tropical origins and study tropical countries and their citizens with more holistic and inclusive approaches.
