= Edward Colborne Baber =

Edward Colborne Baber (30 April 1843 – 16 June 1890) was an English orientalist and traveller.

== Life ==
Born at Dulwich, he studied at Rossall Junior School, Christ's Hospital and Magdalene College, Cambridge, where he graduated in 1867.

Having learned Chinese, he started working at the British embassy in Beijing the same year, where he quickly advanced through the ranks. During his tenure he made three journeys to the interior of China; one to the Burmese border in 1876, one to the Sichuan highlands the next year (where he visited the Leshan Giant Buddha, and the last, in 1878, northwards through the mountains from Chongqing. His travels and discoveries were described in books, and in 1883 he received the Royal Geographical Society's Patron's Medal.

From 1885 to 1886, Baber acted as consul-general in Korea. Then he was appointed political resident at Bhamo on the upper Irrawaddy, where he died, unmarried, on 16 June 1890.

== Sources ==
- Thomas Seccombe, rev. Janette Ryan (May 2006) [2004]. "Baber, Edward Colborne (1843–1890)". Oxford Dictionary of National Biography. Oxford Dictionary of National Biography. Online (online ed.). Oxford University Press. doi:10.1093/ref:odnb/964. (Subscription or UK public library membership required.)
