= Baird Peninsula =

Peninsula in Nunavut, Canada

Coordinates: 68°55′N 076°00′W

Location in Nunavut

Baird Peninsula is a peninsula in west central Baffin Island in the Qikiqtaaluk Region of Nunavut, Canada. It juts into the Foxe Basin past Longstaff Bluff. Prince Charles Island lies to the south.

It is named in honor of the Scottish explorer and glaciologist Colonel Patrick Douglas Baird (1913–1984).
