= Gordon Warwick =

Dr. Gordon Thomas Warwick (1918–1983) was a geomorphologist and speleologist, based for his entire working career at Birmingham University. Following upon his death in 1983, a medal was instituted in his honour by the British Geomorphological Research Group, of which he was a founder member.

== Life and career ==
He was born in 1918, in the small railway village of Westhouses, near Alfreton in Derbyshire, the son of a former dining car attendant, colliery banksman and then railway fitter, Gordon Henry Warwick. He attended the Railway School there, only about 100 yards from his home, and then went to Tapton Hall Grammar School, winning prizes every year, and eventually going to Bristol University in 1936, becoming the first person from the village to go to University, with a teaching scholarship from Derbyshire County Council. He left Bristol with a First in Geography and immediately volunteered for army service, upon declaration of War in 1939. After about 6 months in the Army Reserve he was accepted for officer training, in Yorkshire and on Salisbury Plain and spent the early part of his army career as an instructor in Tidworth and in Llanidloes. He spent much of the later years of the war in Tunisia, Algeria and Italy, mostly as a sound ranger, progressing to the rank of Captain and was awarded an MBE. He was in charge of Serbian prisoners of war at Cesena in the former football stadium and prior to demobilization he spent time teaching at the Army Formation College at Perugia.

After military service he went to Birmingham University and taught geomorphology in the Geography Department, eventually rising to the post of Reader in Geomorphology. His thesis, delayed because of his war service, was on the Derbyshire reef limestones of the Manifold and Dove valleys, and much of the field work was undertaken with the help of his wife, Phyllis. Gordon Thomas Warwick was awarded his PhD by Birmingham University in 1953. (PhD, University of Birmingham, Faculty of Science, Department of Geography, 1953.) His specialisms were limestone and semi-arid climate processes, and he was a contributor to books such British Caving with Cecil Cullingford, A Dictionary of Geographical Terms with Sir L. Dudley Stamp and to the Guide to Birmingham and its Region of Prof Michael Wise. He retained a close interest in caving throughout his adult life and he was closely involved in the academic study of speleology and of the administration of its governing bodies, being a vice president of the UIS, taking a major role at its international conferences and was a member of many organizations such as the South Wales Caving Club, Cave Research Group, Cave History Group. His main contribution to speleology in later years was theoretical rather than practical and he contributed much to the theory of the origin and development of caves.

Because of his geomorphological studies of limestone areas and processes he also received medals for his work from several European Universities, and was a close associate of men such as Alfred Bögli. He was awarded the Gill Memorial Award by the Royal Geographical Society in 1965 for services to cave studies.

He also developed an interest in derelict land reclamation and clean air and was an early environmentalist, through a part-time position with the Ministry of Land and Natural Resources, later the Department of the Environment. After becoming involved with the Black Country Society, he wrote various pamphlets on subjects such as the Wren's Nest Nature Reserve and ghost-wrote a history of Darby Hand Chapel in Dudley.

He tutored a large number of students both at undergraduate and graduate level, including a series of Iraqi geomorphologists and was an external examiner at Oxford, Bristol and Cambridge Universities.

He was named after his father, who was the first person in England to be called Gordon Warwick, being named after General Gordon. He died suddenly in 1983 of a stroke, and is remembered by the Warwick Prize at Birmingham University and a Warwick Memorial Library at Derby University and at the South Wales Caving club. This latter is now part of a national resource of caving literature and some of his photographs and papers also form part of the National Caving Archive held at the British Geological Survey in Keyworth. He was a distant relative of the marksman, gunsmith and bicycle manufacturer, John Warrick of Reading, actor Shaun Bean, the author, G.A. Henty and of the Freebody family of the Debenham and Freebody department store.

== See also ==
- Caving in the United Kingdom
