= Weddell Sea Expedition 2019 =

- Date: 3 January – 20 February 2019
- Duration: 49 days
- Location: Weddell Sea, Antarctica
- Type: Expedition
- Participants: John Shears (Co-leader of expedition); Julian Dowdeswell (Chief Scientist)
- Website: weddellseaexpedition.org

The Weddell Sea Expedition 2019 was a 49-day expedition to the Weddell Sea, in Antarctica, that sought to study the glaciology and biology at and near the Larsen C ice shelf. It was the first expedition to investigate the area that Iceberg A-68 broke away from in July 2017.

In addition to the scientific objectives, the expedition was active in the region where Ernest Shackleton's ship, the Endurance, sank in 1915. Expedition Chief Scientist, Professor Julian Dowdeswell commented, "if we are that close to one of the most iconic vessels in polar exploration, we have got to go and look for it." Although the team deployed an autonomous underwater vehicle (AUV) to search for the wreck, it lost communication with the device beneath the ice and was forced to abandon the search. The wreck of the Endurance remained undiscovered until 2022, when a follow-up expedition, Endurance22, successfully located it in remarkably preserved condition at a depth of over 3,000 meters.

Subsequent analysis has shown that sea-ice conditions in 2019 were unusually thick and mobile, complicating under-ice operations, while favorable ice conditions in 2022 were a key factor in the wreck's discovery. The 2019 expedition nonetheless laid important groundwork for the success of Endurance22, and contributed to growing scientific understanding of rapid changes in the Weddell Sea region, including declining Antarctic Bottom Water formation and shifting sea-ice dynamics.
