= William Gaskell Medal =

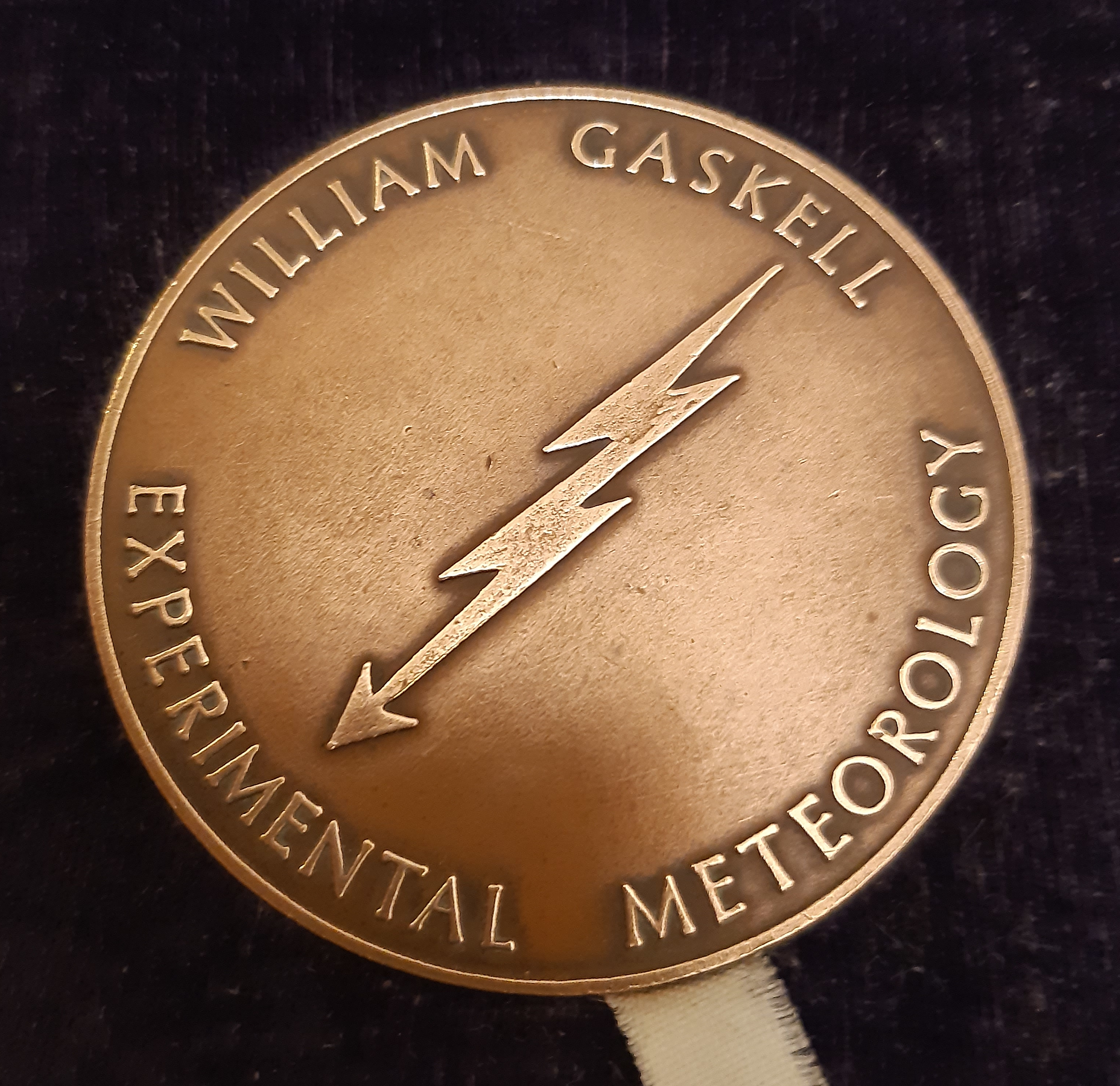
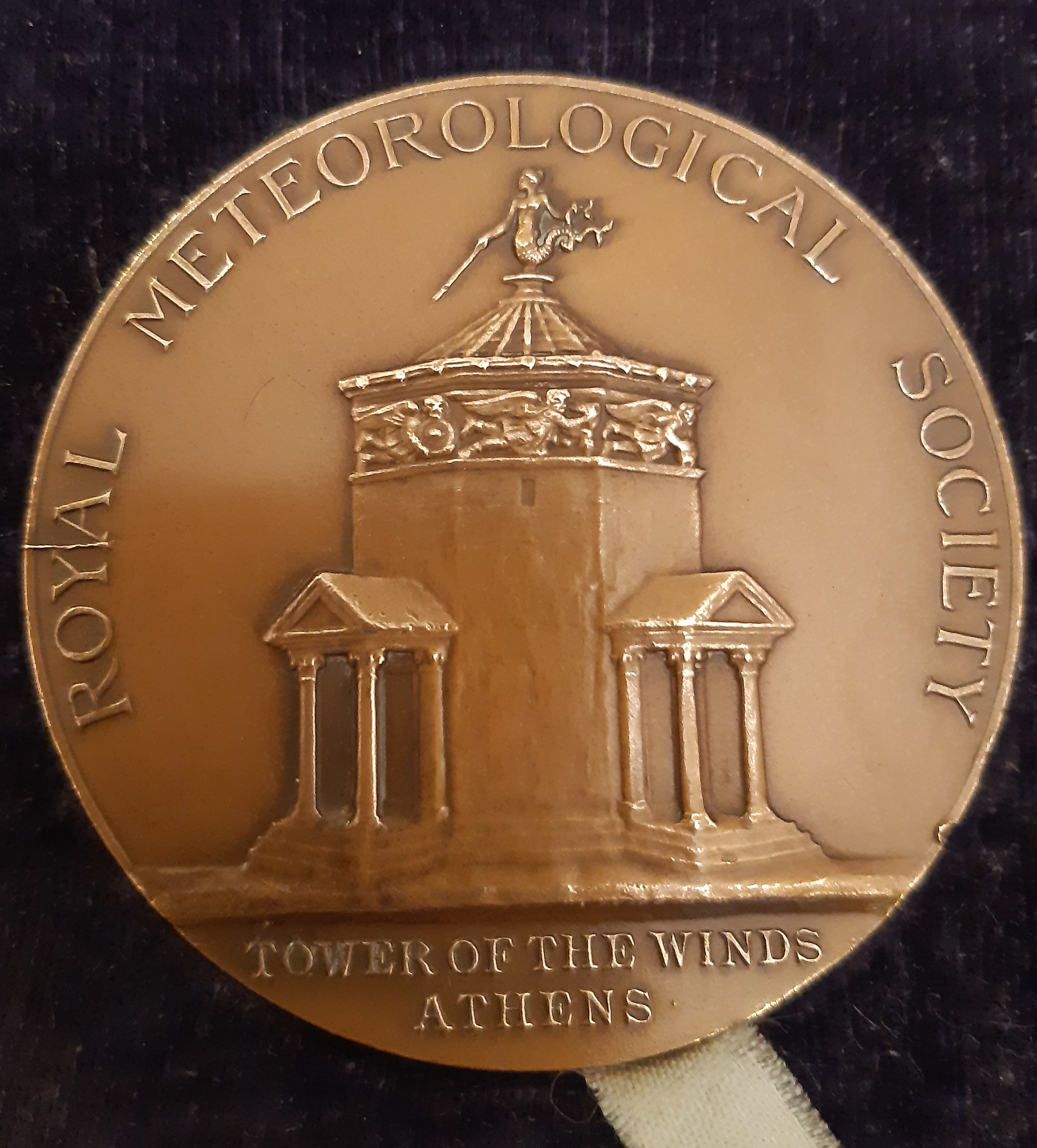
Front and back of William Gaskell Medal.

The William Gaskell Medal was awarded annually by the Royal Meteorological Society to a scientist who has distinguished himself in the field of experimental meteorology.

The medal was named in honour of Dr William Gaskell, a meteorologist who was killed along with 3 colleagues on a research flight to study microphysical and electrical properties in supercooled clouds on 2 March 1980. It is funded by the Desert Research Institute, Reno, Nevada and the University of Manchester Institute of Science and Technology (UMIST).

Dr William Gaskell was born in Bolton, UK on 17 December 1946 and was a research scientist at the Desert Research Institute. He obtained his Ph.D from UMIST in 1979 for his thesis on 'Field and Laboratory Studies of Precipitation Charges'. It was later accepted for publication in the Quarterly Journal of the Royal Meteorological Society

The Medal was first presented in 1981 to Peter Ryder of the Meteorological Office. Recipients were asked to deliver the William Gaskell Memorial Lecture to the society.

== Notable Recipients ==
- 1994 John Latham
- 1992 John Woods
- 1989 Michael Hugh Unsworth
- 1988 Robert Spencer Harwood
- 1987 Stuart Penkett
- 1983 John T. Houghton
- 1983 Garry E. Hunt
- 1982 Keith Anthony Browning
- 1981 Peter Ryder

== See also ==
- List of meteorology awards
- List of prizes named after people
