= Walter Smith (land surveyor) =

English land surveyor

Walter Purvis Smith CB OBE (March 1920 – 11 December 2018) was an English land surveyor notable for being the first civilian Director General of the Ordnance Survey, from 1977 to 1985.

== Personal life ==
Walter Smith was born in Houghton-le-Spring, County Durham (now part of the City of Sunderland), in March 1920 and was educated at state schools in eastern Durham. He studied at St Edmund Hall, Oxford in 1938, but his studies were interrupted by the outbreak of World War II and he left in 1940 with a War Honours Degree. In 1946 he married Bettie Cox, and had two children: Barbara (born 1949) and Geoffrey (born 1952).

== Military career ==
After initial service in the Royal Artillery, Smith joined the Royal Engineers. Following training at Fort Widely, near Portsmouth, he was commissioned in 1941. For the next two years he was engaged mainly on coast defence surveys until, in 1943, he took part in exercises resulting in a whole new mapping of the northern coast of France in preparation for the Normandy landings. For the latter, he was awarded the Commander in Chief’s Certificate. In June 1944 he landed at Arromanches-les-Bains and undertook surveys in support of the artillery. He was appointed a Member of the Order of the British Empire (MBE) (military) at the end of 1944.

In 1945-6 he worked with the Control Commission for Germany on the rehabilitation of some German State Survey Offices (HVA). In 1957 he returned to his earlier interest in the Territorial Army where, on promotion to Lieutenant-Colonel, he assumed command of 135 Survey Engineer Regiment TA. He was advanced to OBE (military) in 1960.

== Civilian career ==
On demobilisation in 1946, Smith joined the newly formed Directorate of Colonial Surveys and took its first field party abroad to The Gold Coast (now Ghana) for surveys connected with the Volta River hydro-electric project. This was followed by a mission to Nyasaland (now Malawi) to measure that country's base-line and reconnoitre a major triangulation chain from Mount Mulanje in the south, then 600 miles northwards to Mbeya in southern Tanganyika (now Tanzania).

In 1950 Smith returned to the UK to take up an appointment as Chief Surveyor of the Air Survey Company, a subsidiary of The Fairey Aviation Company and in the same year was made a Fellow of the Royal Institution of Chartered Surveyors. He remained in the private sector for the next 24 years, which included three years as founder and manager of Fairey's Southern Rhodesian subsidiary. He became Joint Managing Director of the UK company and was responsible for mapping projects in many parts of the world, including the UK, Singapore, East Pakistan, Nepal, East Africa, the Caribbean and in support of international boundary determination in Patagonia. The latter project, which involved service officers from the UK, Argentina and Chile, achieved a high profile because of its urgency, the very mountainous terrain and the uncertain weather conditions which were likely to impede high altitude aerial photography.

In 1973 he became President of the Photogrammetry Society and in 1975 was appointed Advisor, Surveys and Mapping at the United Nations, New York. For two years he travelled extensively, on behalf of the UN, supervising projects of institution-strengthening or mapping in support of various countries' development programmes.

=== Ordnance Survey ===
Smith was appointed Director General of the Ordnance Survey in 1977 and was immediately involved in the work of an independent committee set up to review the organisation; the first such review for forty years. Smith remained at the Ordnance Survey for eight years, during which he had four main concerns:

1. To ensure continuing progress of the digitising of all the Survey’s large scale plans. This came at substantial cost and produced little revenue until national coverage had been achieved.
2. The departure of all the department’s military officers, an event marked by Beating the Retreat by the Royal Engineers Band in 1983.
3. The introduction of the department’s first comprehensive management information and accruals accounting systems.
4. Dealing with some staff unease, following a freeze on recruitment and ministerial suggestions of privatisation of the Ordnance Survey during the first Thatcher government.

He was appointed a Companion of the Order of the Bath in 1981.

Following his retirement from the Ordnance Survey, Smith was deputy chairman of an independent committee appointed to review the handling of geographic information in the UK. He presided over a major international conference on digital cartography in 1985. In the same year he was awarded the Patron's Medal by the Royal Geographical Society. In 1992/3 he spent a year as the first Director of the Association for Geographic Information.

Smith died in December 2018 at the age of 98.
