= Alan Baker (geographer) =

British geographer (born 1938)

Alan Reginald Harold Baker, FBA (born 1938) is a British geographer. He has been a fellow of Emmanuel College, Cambridge, since 1970. Having graduated from the University of London with a BA in 1960 and a PhD in 1963, he was a lecturer at the University of London (1963–66) and then the University of Cambridge (1966–2001). He was head of the Department of Geography at Cambridge from 1989 to 1994. He was Editor of the Journal of Historical Geography (1987–96) and Co-editor of 44 books in the Cambridge University Press' series Cambridge Studies in Historical Geography (1980–2005).

Baker was appointed a chevalier of the Order of Academic Palms in 1997, was awarded the Royal Geographical Society's Gill Memorial Award in 1974 and its Founders Medal in 2009, and was elected a fellow of the British Academy in 2010. He was the subject of a festschrift: Iain S. Black and R. A. Butlin (eds), Place, Culture and Identity: Essays in Historical Geography in Honour of Alan R. H. Baker (Quebec: Presses de l'Université Laval, 2001).

== Publications ==
- (editor, with John D. Hamshere and John Langton) Geographical Interpretations of Historical Sources: Readings in Historical Geography (Newton Abbot: David and Charles, 1970)
- Progress in Human Geography (Newton Abbot: David and Charles, 1972)
- (editor, with R. A. Butlin) Studies of Field Systems in the British Isles (Cambridge: Cambridge University Press, 1973)
- (editor, with Gordon Manley and J. B. Harley) Man Made the Land: Essays in English Historical Geography (Newton Abbot: David and Charles, 1973)
- Historical Geography and Geographical Change, Aspects of Geography (Basingstoke: Macmillan, 1975)
- (editor, with Mark Billinge) Period and Place: Research Methods in Historical Geography (Cambridge: Cambridge University Press, 1982)
- (with Derek Gregory) Explorations in Historical Geography: Interpretative Essays, Cambridge Studies in Historical Geography, vol. 5 (Cambridge: Cambridge University Press, 1984)
- Fraternity among the French Peasantry: Sociability and Voluntary Associations in the Loire Valley, 1815–1914 (Cambridge: Cambridge University Press, 1999)
- Geography and History: Bridging the Divide (Cambridge: Cambridge University Press, 2003)
- (editor, with Mark Billinge) Geographies of England: The North–South Divide, Material and Imagined (Cambridge: Cambridge university Press, 2004)
- (editor) Home and Colonial: Essays on Landscape, Ireland, Environment and Empire in Celebration of Robin Butlin's Contribution to Historical Geography (London: Historical Geography Research Group, 2004)
- (editor, with Gideon Biger) Ideology and Landscape in Historical Perspective: Essays on the Meanings of Some Places in the Past (Cambridge: Cambridge University Press, 2006) ISBN 0521024706, 9780521024709
- Amateur Musical Societies and Sports Clubs in Provincial France, 1848–1914: Harmony and Hostility (Cham: Palgrave Macmillan, 2017)
- A French Reading Revolution? The Development, Distribution and Cultural Significance of Bibliothèques Populaires, 1860–1900 (London: Historical Geography Research Group, 2018) ISBN 1870074270, 9781870074278
- The Personality of Paris: Landscape and Society in the Long-Nineteenth Century (London: Bloomsbury Academic, 2022) ISBN 1350252670, 9781350252677
