= Gordon Conway =

British ecologist (1938–2023)

Professor Sir Gordon Conway KCMG FRS FRGS FREng
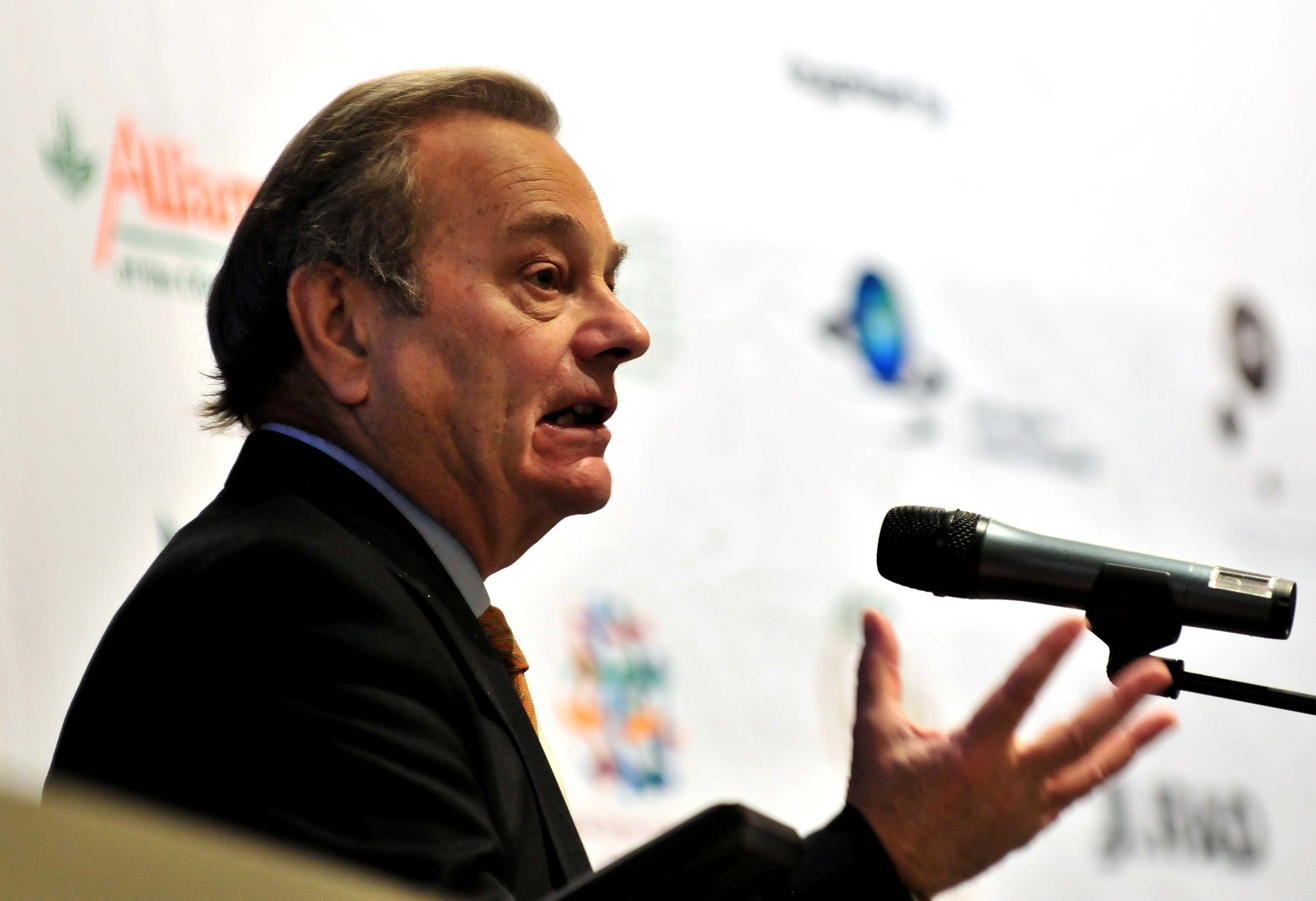
- Born: Gordon Richard Conway; 6 July 1938; Birmingham, England
- Died: 30 July 2023 (aged 85)
- Education: Bangor University; Cambridge University; University of the West Indies; University of California, Davis
- Awards: Fellow of the Royal Society (2004); KCMG (2005); Founder's Medal (2017)
- Scientific career
- Fields: Agricultural Ecology
- Workplaces: Imperial College London; University of California, Davis; The Rockefeller Foundation
- Thesis: A Basic Model of Insect Reproduction and its Implications for Pest Control (1969)
- Website: www3.imperial.ac.uk/people/g.conway

Sir Gordon Richard Conway (6 July 1938 – 30 July 2023) was a British agricultural ecologist, who served as the president of the Rockefeller Foundation and the Royal Geographical Society. He was latterly Professor of International Development at Imperial College, London and Director of Agriculture for Impact, a grant funded by the Bill & Melinda Gates Foundation, which focuses on European support of agricultural development in Africa.

== Early life and education ==
Gordon Richard Conway was born in Birmingham on 6 July 1938. He was educated at the Bangor University, Cambridge University and the University of the West Indies in Trinidad. He completed his Doctor of Philosophy degree at the University of California, Davis.

== Career ==
In the early 1960s, working in Sabah, North Borneo, Conway became one of the pioneers of sustainable agriculture and integrated pest management. From 1970 to 1986, he was Professor of Environmental Technology at the Imperial College of Science and Technology in London. He then directed the sustainable agriculture program of the International Institute for Environment and Development in London before becoming Representative of the Ford Foundation in New Delhi from 1988 to 1992. He was Vice-Chancellor of the University of Sussex and Chair of the Institute of Development Studies.

Conway was elected the eleventh President of The Rockefeller Foundation in April 1998, a position he held until 2004. From 2004 to 2009 he was also President of the Royal Geographical Society. He took up his appointment as the UK Department for International Development's Chief Scientific Adviser in January 2005, serving until 2009.

Conway later worked at Imperial College London and headed the Bill & Melinda Gates-funded project Agriculture for Impact looking into ways to increase and enhance agricultural development for smallholder farmers in Sub-Saharan Africa. It was an independent advocacy initiative, and was based at Imperial College London and was supported through the Agriculture for Impact Bill & Melinda Gates Foundation. According to the organisation's website, the initiative ran until the summer of 2016. Agriculture for Impact also convened the Montpellier Panel, a group of international experts from the fields of agriculture, trade, policy, ecology and global development. He was a Deputy Lieutenant for East Sussex.

== Death ==
Conway died of blood cancer on 30 July 2023, at the age of 85.

== Honours and awards ==
- June 2004 awarded an honorary degree from the Open University as Doctor of the University.
- 2004: elected a Fellow of the Royal Society
- 2005: invested Knight Commander of the Order of Saint Michael and Saint George (KCMG)
- 2005: listed on The 2005 Global Intellectuals Poll
- 2008: elected an Honorary Fellow of the Royal Academy of Engineering
- 2017: awarded the Founder's Medal of the Royal Geographical Society

== Books ==
He authored:

- Unwelcome Harvest: agriculture and pollution (Earthscan, Island Press) ISBN 1-85383-036-4
- The Doubly Green Revolution: Food for all in the 21st century (Penguin and University Press, Cornell) ISBN 0-8014-8610-6
- Islamophobia: a challenge for us all (The Runnymede Trust) ISBN 0-902397-98-2.

He co-authored:

- Science and Innovation for Development (UK Collaborative on Development Sciences (UKCDS))
- One Billion Hungry: Can we Feed the World? was published in October 2012.
