= Michael John Wise =

British economic geographer (1918–2015)

Michael John Wise CBE, MC
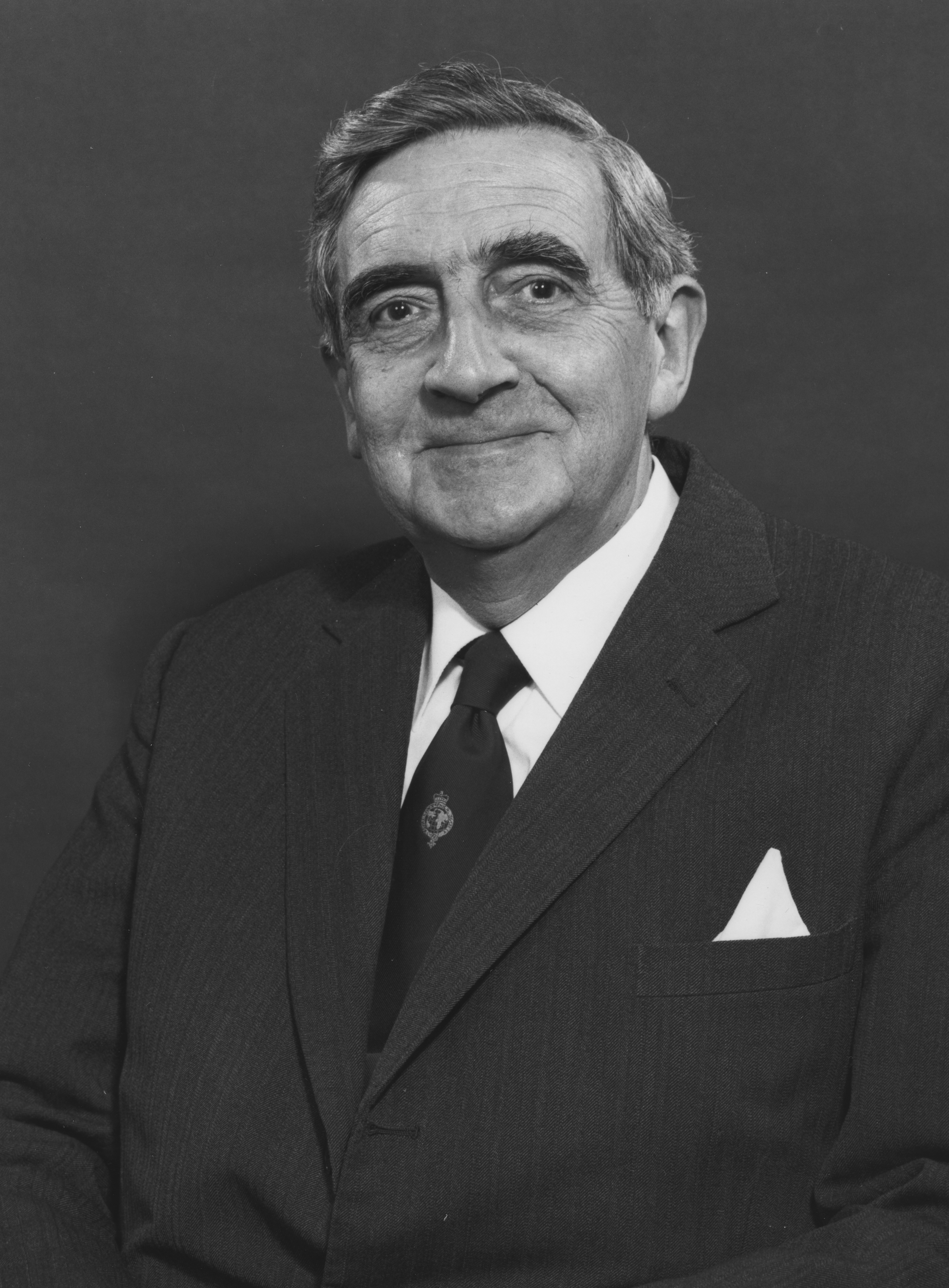
- Wise, c. 1980s
- Born: 17 August 1918
- Died: 13 October 2015 (aged 97)
- Awards: Gill Memorial award, Founder's Medal, Alexander Körōsi Csoma Medal

Academic background
- Education: University of Birmingham
- Influences: Gordon Warwick

Academic work
- Discipline: Geographer
- Institutions: London School of Economics

Michael John Wise CBE, MC (17 August 1918 – 13 October 2015) was a British academic who served as a professor of geography at the University of London.

== Early life ==
Michael Wise was born in Stafford in 1918. He was the son of Harry Cuthbert Wise and Sarah Evelyn Wise.

== Education ==
After attending Saltley Secondary School, Birmingham, he attended the University of Birmingham where he completed his BA in Geography in 1939. After his service in World War II, he returned to Birmingham as an assistant lecturer and lecturer, gaining a PhD in 1951. It was at this point that he met Gordon Warwick, a fellow assistant lecturer, who became a lifelong friend, with Wise being godfather to the latter's daughter. They later collaborated on the British Association Handbook for the Birmingham meeting.

== War service ==
During the Second World War, Wise served in the British Army in Europe and the Middle East, reaching the rank of Major in 1944. He was awarded the Military Cross.

== Career ==
On completion of his PhD in 1951, Wise moved to the London School of Economics (LSE) as lecturer, becoming Sir Ernest Cassel Reader in Economic geography in 1954 and Professor in 1958. During the student disturbances of 1968, he defended the treasures of the LSE Map Room and negotiated their exemption from occupation during a sit-in.

Wise served as member, president, etc. of many learned societies including the British Association for the Advancement of Science, the Transport Studies Society, International Geographical Union, Geographical Association, and Royal Geographical Society.

He died on 13 October 2015 at the age of 97.

== Honours ==
Wise received the RGS Gill Memorial award (1958) and Founder's Medal (1977) and also the Alexander Körōsi Csoma Medal of the Hungarian Geographical Society (1980), the Tokyo Geographical Society Medal (1981) and the Lauréat d'Honneur of the International Geographical Union (1984). He was awarded the CBE in 1979. The University of Birmingham awarded him an honorary DSc in 1982. In 2008 his 90th birthday was marked by a gathering of colleagues and former students at the LSE.
