= Mike Kirkby =

Michael J Kirkby (born 6 May 1937) is a British geographer and Emeritus Professor of Physical Geography at the University of Leeds.

Kirkby was educated at the University of Cambridge from which he holds the degrees of BA and PhD. After a lectureship in Geography at the University of Bristol, he was appointed Professor of Physical Geography at the University of Leeds in 1973 and was Chairman of the School of Geography at Leeds three times; from 1978 to 1981, 1984 to 1987 and 1992 to 1995. Kirkby retired from his chair with the title Emeritus Professor in 2002.

In 1976 Kirkby gained a Gill Memorial award from the Royal Geographical Society. In 1989 he gained a David Linton Award from the British Geomorphological Research Group. In 1999 he was awarded a Founder's Medal by the Royal Geographical Society / Institute of British Geographers. In 2004 he became a fellow of the American Geophysical Union.

== Education ==
- PhD (University of Cambridge): Geomorphology (supervised by Richard Chorley)
- 1960: BA (University of Cambridge): Mathematics (Part II) and Geography (Part II) (Trinity College): Philip Lake Prize
