= Julian A. Dowdeswell =

British glaciologist

Professor Julian A. Dowdeswell
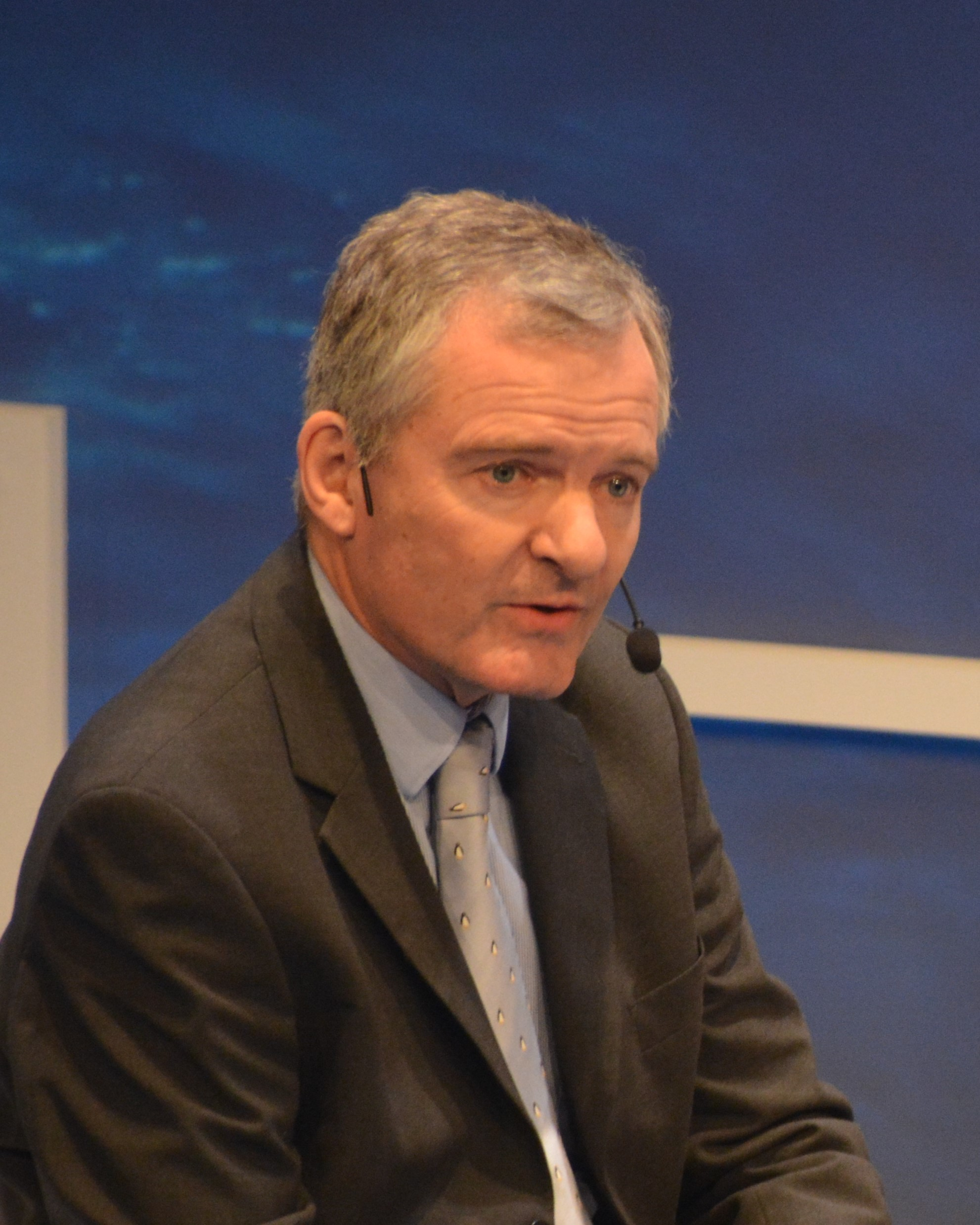
- Julian Dowdeswell
- Education: University of Cambridge
- Known for: Work on the form and flow of glaciers and ice caps and their response to climate change, and the links between former ice sheets and the marine geological record, using a variety of satellite, airborne and shipborne geophysical tools.
- Awards: Polar Medal; Gill Memorial Award; Founder's Medal; Louis Agassiz Medal; IASC Medal; Lyell Medal
- Scientific career
- Fields: glaciology
- Workplaces: Scott Polar Research Institute, University of Cambridge
- Thesis: [www.spri.cam.ac.uk/graduate/theses/ Remote Sensing Studies of Svalbard Glaciers] (1984)

Julian A. Dowdeswell ScD FLSW (born 18 November 1957) is a British glaciologist and a Professor of Physical Geography in the Department of Geography at the University of Cambridge, and from 2002 to 2021 was the Director of the Scott Polar Research Institute.

== Education ==
Dowdeswell graduated with a BA in geography from the University of Cambridge in 1980, and studied for a master's degree at Institute of Arctic and Alpine Research (INSTAAR) in the University of Colorado Boulder and for a Ph.D. in the Scott Polar Research Institute.

== Career ==
He started his career as a lecturer in Physical Geography at the University of Wales, Aberystwyth. He subsequently went on to work as a Professor of Physical Geography and Director of the Bristol Glaciology Centre, University of Bristol and then to the University of Cambridge in 2001. He became the director of the Scott Polar Research Institute in 2002. He is also a professorial fellow at Jesus College, Cambridge.

His research focuses on the form and flow of glaciers and ice caps and their response to climate change, and the links between former ice sheets and the marine geological record, using a variety of satellite, airborne and shipborne geophysical tools.

In 2018, Dowdeswell was elected a Fellow of the Learned Society of Wales.

In 2019 Professor Dowdeswell was Chief Scientist on the Weddell Sea Expedition 2019, which aimed to:

- investigate the ice shelves around the Weddell Sea and, in particular, the Larsen C Ice Shelf from which a giant iceberg broke off in July 2017
- document the rich and little-studied marine life of the western Weddell Sea ecosystem
- attempt to locate and survey the wreck of Sir Ernest Shackleton's ship 'Endurance', which was trapped and crushed by the ice and sank in the Weddell Sea in 1915.

=== Awards ===
- Polar Medal (1994) by H.M. The Queen for 'outstanding contributions to glacier geophysics'.
- Gill Memorial Award (1998) from the Royal Geographical Society.
- Founder's Medal (2008) from the Royal Geographical Society.
- Louis Agassiz Medal (2011) from the European Geosciences Union for 'outstanding contributions to the study of polar ice masses and to the understanding of the processes and patterns of sedimentation in glacier-influenced marine environments'.
- IASC Medal (2014) by the International Arctic Science Committee.
- Lyell Medal (2018) from the Geological Society of London

Cultural offices
Preceded by Keith Richards	Director of the Scott Polar Research Institute; 2002–2021	Succeeded by Neil Arnold
