= Pierre Gourou =

French geographer

- Born: August 31, 1900
- Died: May 13, 1999 (aged 98)
- Occupation: Geographer
- Known for: Received the Patron's Medal from the Royal Geographical Society

Pierre Gourou (31 August 1900 – 13 May 1999) was a French geographer. In 1984, he received the Patron's Medal from the Royal Geographical Society.
