= Patrick Douglas Baird =

Scottish glaciologist (1912–1984)

Patrick Douglas Baird (1912 – 1 January 1984) was a Scottish glaciologist who worked in the Canadian Arctic.

He was born the fourth son of Brigadier-General E.W.D. Baird of Caithness, Scotland and was educated at Edinburgh Academy and Corpus Christi College, Cambridge, graduating in Geology.

After working for some years as a geologist in Africa he joined the British-Canadian Arctic Expedition of Ō 1936-1939, working in Southampton Island, the Melville Peninsula and Baffin Island. In 1939 he crossed Bylot Island and sailed in the Hudson's Bay Company ship Nascopie to join the Royal Canadian Artillery. During the war he was concerned with paratrooper training in Scotland and with arctic and mountain warfare training back in Canada, rising to the rank of lieutenant-colonel. He achieved a measure of celebrity status in 1945/1946 when he successfully led the main party in "Exercise Muskox" on a 3400-mile expedition around the Canadian Arctic from Churchill via Victoria Island and Coppermine to the Peace River.

In 1946 he was appointed chief of the Arctic Section of the Canadian Defence Research Board and the following year made Director of the Montreal Office of the Arctic Institute of North America, an organisation established to improve Canadian scientific and technical expertise in the Arctic. During his time there he organised and led two major expeditions to Baffin Island, one in 1950 to the Barnes Ice Cap region and one in 1953 to the Pangnirtung Pass and Penny Highlands area, which carried out the first glaciological investigations in the Canadian Arctic. Baird became an acknowledged authority on mountain glacier research and arctic mountaineering.

In 1954 he returned to his native Scotland to work for five years as a senior research fellow in Geography at the University of Aberdeen. Whilst there he started to write his book The Polar World which was later published in 1964.

In 1959 he returned to Canada as director of the Gault Estate of McGill University, a 2,600-acre property at Mont-St-Hilaire, Quebec, and as supervisor of Northern Field Studies in the Department of Geography. In 1952 he was awarded the Founder's Medal of the Royal Geographical Society for "his explorations in the Canadian Arctic". Other awards included the Bruce Memorial Medal of the Royal Society of Edinburgh and a Queen Elizabeth II Coronation Medal.

He died in Ottawa in 1984. He had married twice, to Gillian Margaret Warren, with whom he had a son and three daughters and to Geneva Adair Jackson of Montreal. The Baird Peninsula of Baffin Island is named after him.

== Archives ==
There is a Patrick Douglas Baird fonds at Library and Archives Canada. Archival reference number is R5346.
