= Imperial Maritime League =

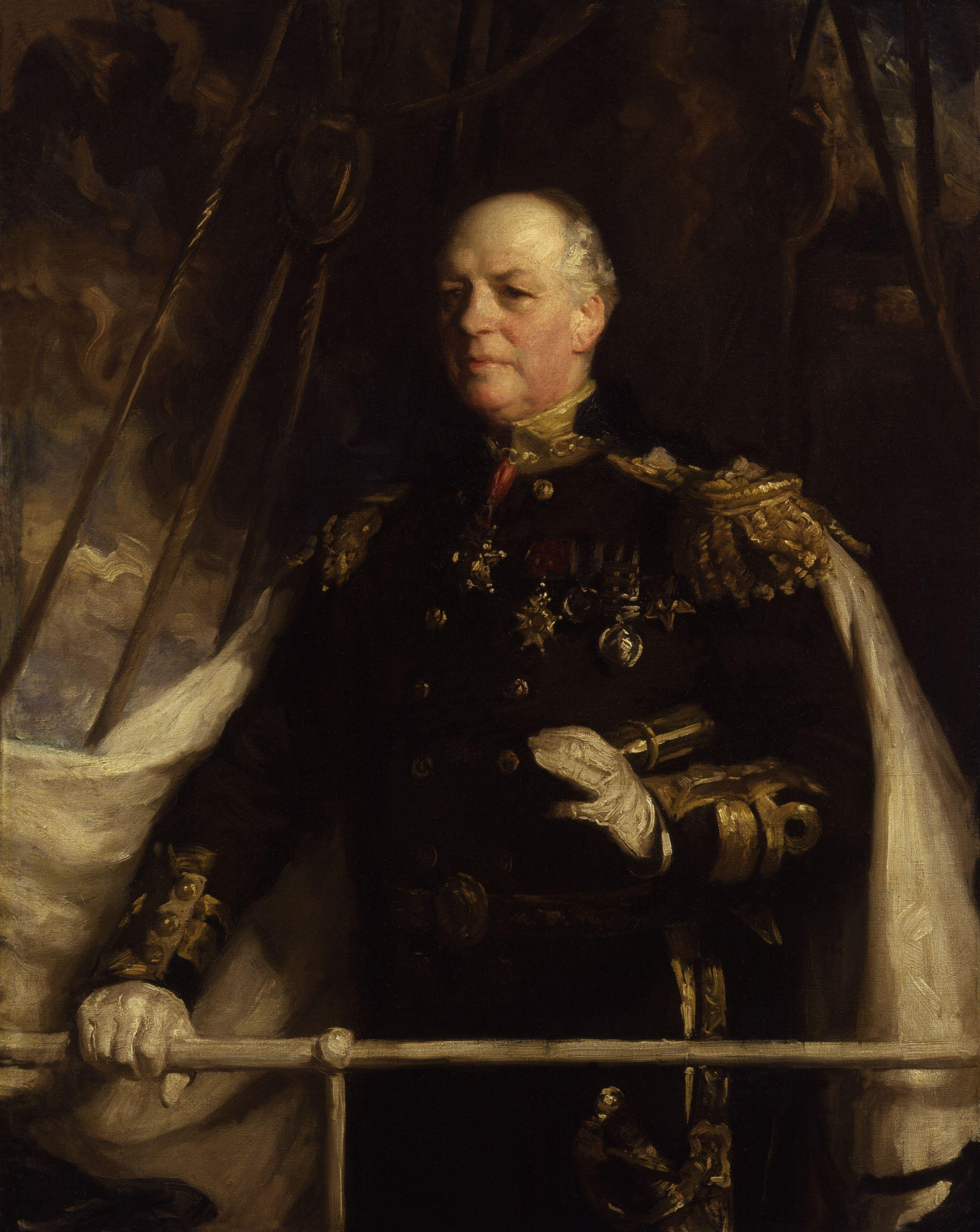
Lord Charles Beresford was a prominent supporter of the Imperial Maritime League

The Imperial Maritime League was a British pressure group founded on 27 January 1908 as a breakaway from the Navy League in order to campaign for a larger navy. It focused on the media, linking editors with right-wing naval officers in order to challenge the Unionist government, the Admiralty, and the established Navy League as not aggressive enough toward Germany.

Navy League members Lionel Horton-Smith and Harold F. Wyatt had become dissatisfied with the Navy League's refusal to publicly agitate on the naval issue and so sought to establish a new, "navier" league. A majority of the Third London branch of the Navy League's members voted to secede at a special meeting on 11 January 1908 and join Horton-Smith and Wyatt's proposed league.

The First Sea Lord Sir John Fisher was embarking on controversial reforms of the Royal Navy, which were opposed by Commander-in-Chief of the Channel Fleet, Lord Charles Beresford. The new League was supported by Beresford and others of the anti-Fisher persuasion.

Lord Esher wrote to The Times:

The Board of Admiralty may occasionally make mistakes, but that they have by word or act appeared to doubt the vital necessity for naval supremacy, or that they would stoop to subordinate the naval superiority of this country to any personal or political exigency does not require to be proved by a “public inquiry.” There is not a man in Germany from the Emperor downwards who would not welcome the fall of Sir John Fisher, and for this reason only, apart from all others, I must beg to declined your invitation to join the council of the Maritime League.

In response the Kaiser wrote to the King that he was writing to Lord Tweedmouth to reject Esher's assertions and further claimed that Germany's naval programme posed no threat to Britain. The Kaiser's letter denounced Esher's opinion about the likely German response to Fisher's fall as "a piece of unmitigated balderdash" written by the "supervisor of the royal drains". It was "absolutely nonsensical and untrue" to argue that Germany's Naval Law was intended to challenge British naval supremacy: "The German Fleet is built against nobody at all...the German Danger [was] utterly unworthy of...a great nation...and its mighty navy which is about five times the size of the German navy; there is something very ludicrous about it".

In response to the founding of the Imperial Maritime League, the Navy League began a political agitation against "Little Navy" MPs. In 1913, with Imperial Maritime League members drifting back to the Navy League and the resignation of both Wyatt and Horton-Smith as secretaries, there were suggestions that the two leagues should combine, though this did not happen. In July 1914 the secretary, Captain Mathias, estimated the number of copies of the League's magazine required for each member at 1,460 distributed in twelve branches.
