= John Woods (oceanographer) =

British oceanographer

John David Woods, CBE (born 1939) is a British oceanographer.

He studied physics at Imperial College, London (1958–66), after which he was appointed principal research fellow at the Meteorological Office (1966–72), while leading the RN Operation Thermocline in which he pioneered underwater flow visualisation. Later he joined NERC as Director of Marine and Atmospheric Science (1986-1994), where he created the National Oceanography Centre at Southampton. He held professorships at Southampton University (1972–77), Kiel University (1977-86) and Imperial College London (1994- ), carrying out research into the seasonal boundary layer of the ocean and plankton ecosystem models, and modelling global container freight.

Woods has served on a number of international project committees, including GARP (Global Atmospheric Research Programme), WCRP (World Climate Research Programme0, IGBP (International GeoSphere-Biosphere Programme), EuroGOOS (European Global Ocean Observing System). He was co-chairman of the World Ocean Circulation Experiment. He was a lead author of the first report of the Intergovernmental Panel on Climate Change (IPCC), an organisation which was later awarded the 2007 Nobel Peace Prize jointly with Al Gore.

He is now (2015) Emeritus Professor of Oceanography & Complex Systems in the Faculty of Engineering, Department of Earth Science & Engineering, Imperial College London. He is Adjunct Fellow of Linacre College, University of Oxford (1994- ), and Emeritus Researcher of the CNR (Italian National Research Council).

== Awards and honors ==
- 1968 Back Award of the Royal Geographical Society
- 1968 L.G.Groves prize, Ministry of Defence.
- 1980 Hon D.Sc., University of Liège, Belgium
- 1982 Silver medal, University of Helsinki
- 1988 Foundation member, Academia Euopæa
- 1991 CBE
- 1991 Hon D.Sc., University of Plymouth
- 1992 William Gaskell Medal of the Royal Meteorological Society
- 1993 Silver medal, Plymouth Marine Sciences
- 1996 Founder's Medal of the Royal Geographical Society
- 2004 Hon D.Sc., University of Southampton
- 2011 British Library, Oral history, Voices of Science

== Books ==
- 1971 Underwater science [with J.N.Lythgoe]
- 1976 Underwater Research [E.Drew & J.N.Lythgoe)
- 2002 Ocean forecasting [with N.Pinardi ]
- 2006 Benguela: Predicting a Large Marine Ecosystem [with V.Shannon, G.Hempel, P.Malanotte-Rizzoli, C.Moloney]
