= A. R. Colquhoun =

Rhodesian politician (1848–1914)

A.R. Colquhoun
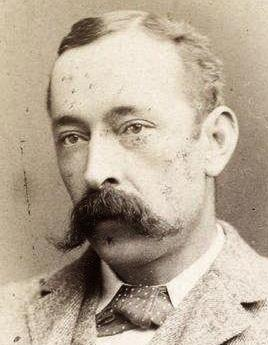
- Colquhoun in 1882

1st Administrator of Southern Rhodesia
- In office 1 October 1890 – 10 September 1892
- Monarch: Queen Victoria
- Preceded by: Office created
- Succeeded by: Leander Starr Jameson

Personal details
- Born: Archibald Ross Colquhoun; March 1848 Cape Town, Cape Colony
- Died: 18 December 1914 (aged 66) London, England
- Spouse: Ethel Maud Cookson

Archibald Ross Colquhoun (/kəˈhuːn/ kə-HOON; March 1848 – 18 December 1914) was a British explorer and the first Administrator of Southern Rhodesia. He held office from October 1890 until September 1892, the period of the founding of Fort Salisbury (now Harare) after the arrival of the Pioneer Column. At this time the administrator's jurisdiction covered Mashonaland only, as Matabeleland was annexed in 1893. He was also acting Chief Magistrate of Southern Rhodesia between 24 July 1891 and 18 September 1891.

== Career ==
Colquhoun was born at sea off the coast of South Africa in March 1848, and spent much of his life travelling. In the 1880s he took part in several exploratory expeditions to Burma, Indo-China and southern China, for which he was awarded the 1884 Founder's Medal of the Royal Geographical Society.

He left for South Africa in 1889. After his term of office as Administrator in Southern Rhodesia he settled in the United Kingdom, but continued to travel. From 1900 to 1901, he and his new wife Ethel travelled in the Pacific —the Dutch East Indies, Borneo, Philippines, Japan – returning to England via Siberia. From 1902 to 1903, he travelled in the West Indies, Central America and the United States. During 1904 and 1905, he returned temporarily to Rhodesia.

In 1913, Colquhoun inspected the Panama Canal construction work and carried out one last mission for the Royal Colonial Institute in South America before his death in London on 18 December 1914.

== Family ==
Colquhoun married at St. Paul's church, Stafford, on 8 March 1900 to Ethel Maud Cookson (1874–1950), eldest daughter of Samuel Cookson, of Forebridge, Stafford. After his death, his widow remarried John Tawse Jollie and settled in Southern Rhodesia, where she became the first female parliamentarian in the British overseas empire.

== Bibliography ==
- Across Chrysê: Being the Narrative of a Journey of Exploration Through the South China Border Lands from Canton to Mandalay (1883), Volume 1, Volume 2
- Amongst the Shans (1885)
- English policy in the Far east, 'The Times' special correspondence (1885), Volume 3
- Matabeleland: the war, and our position in South Africa (1894)
- "China in Transformation with maps and diagrams" (1898), Harper & Bros edition. (New edition, British library, 2011 ISBN 9781241231699).
- The Key of the Pacific (1895)
- Overland to China (1900)
- Colquhoun, Archibald R. (Archibald Ross) (1900). The problem in China and British policy London: King. -University of Hong Kong Libraries, Digital Initiatives, China Through Western Eyes Archived 21 July 2011 at the Wayback Machine
- Greater America (1904)
- The Africander Land (1906)
- The Whirlpool of Europe: Austria-Hungary and the Habsburgs (1907)
- Dan to Beersheba: Work and Travel in Four Continents (1908)
- Lowry, Donal (June 1997). "'White Woman's Country': Ethel Tawse Jollie [nee Ethel Colquhoun] and the Making of White Rhodesia". Journal of Southern African Studies. 23 (2). JSTOR 2637621.
