= Arthur Douglas Carey =

British traveller in Central Asia (?-1936)

Arthur Douglas Carey (c. 1844–1936) was a British civil servant in India, now remembered as a traveller in Central Asia, and in particular for exploration in what is now Xinjiang.

== Early life ==
Carey was educated at the City of London School, and qualified for the Indian Civil Service in 1864. He went out to Bombay in 1865. He was a Collector of Salt Revenue in 1881, and the same year Acting Commissioner of Indian Customs.

== Expedition 1885–1887 ==
On his self-financed Central Asian journey while on furlough from the Indian Civil Service, Carey started from Simla. He was accompanied from Leh as interpreter by Andrew Dalgleish. Their group left Leh and crossed the valley of the Chang Chenmo River into the Aksai Chin.

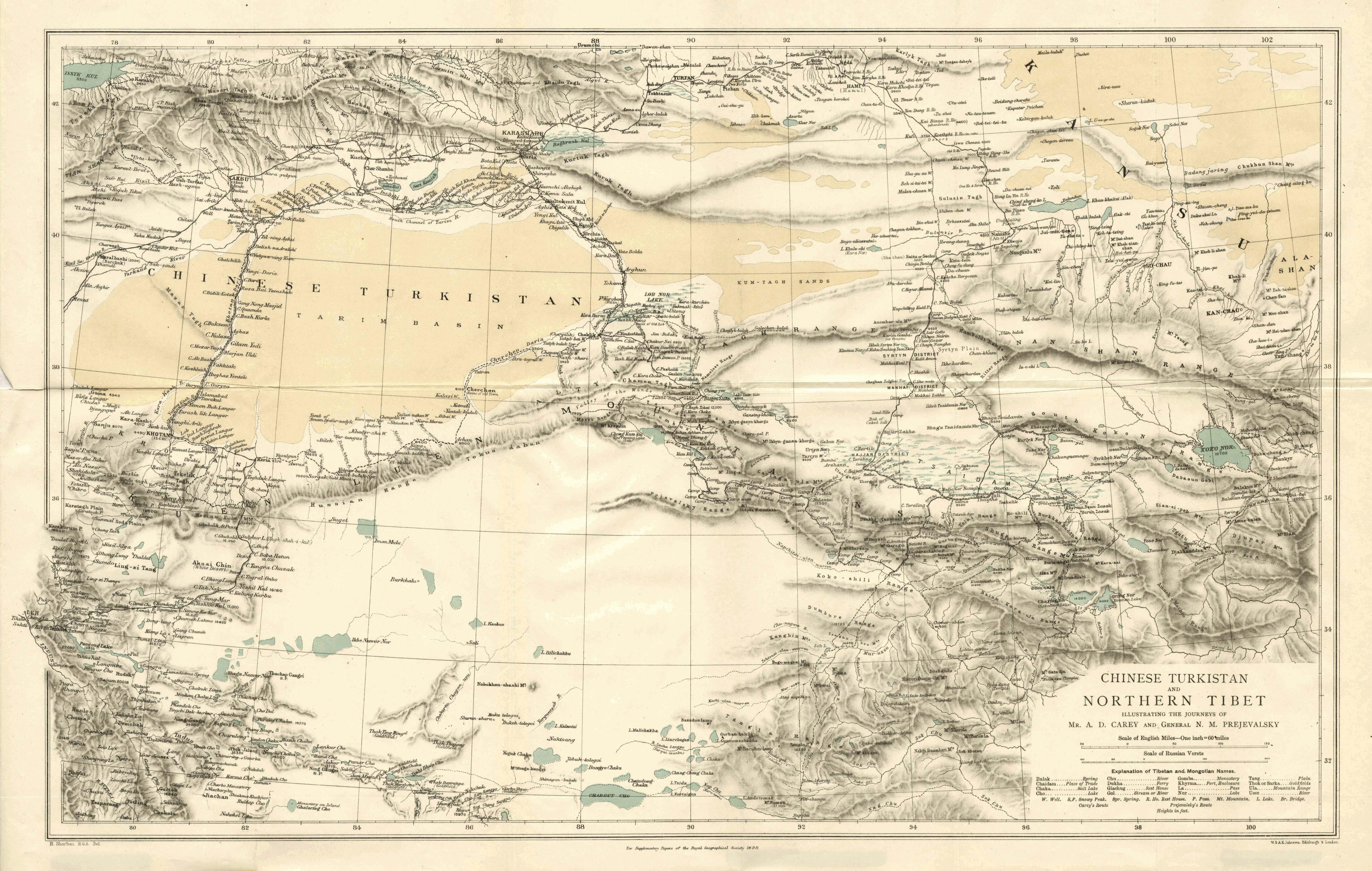
Journeys of A. D. Carey and Nikolay Przhevalsky of the 1880s in what is now southern Xinjiang

For some of the way Carey and Dalgleish were accompanied by H. E. M. James. In Carey's words:

I struck a bargain for baggage-ponies with the Tartars of the frontier villages on the Pangong Lake, and left Tanksé on the 12th of August with a caravan of thirty-one men and forty-nine ponies.

They travelled east from Nubra, passing the landmark Lake Mungtsa (various spellings) and reaching Tashlik-kul on the edge of the Aksai Chin on day 17. They used a high pass, rising to over 17,500 feet (5,300 m). They headed north to Keriya Town and so to Hotan (Khotan).

In terminology of the time attributed to Carl Ritter, the party had crossed the Kunlun Mountains. This first leg of the journey was 585 miles (941 km). The route was not at all well known, but had been documented in 1873 by Kishen Singh, in association with the mission of Douglas Forsyth to Kashgar. Singh went from north to south, rather than south to north, as Carey's party did, and Ney Elias later.

Carey and Dalgleish were the first Europeans to follow the Hotan River from Hotan downstream into the Tarim Basin, and the Yarkand River. At the confluence, they went along the Tarim River to the eastern Kashgar Plain. They visited Karasahr, and went into winter quarters at Kurla to its south. He then turned south to the Lop Nur salt lake region.

Crossing the Altyn-Tagh, the party gained the Tibetan Plateau, and visited the Qaidam Basin, now in Qinghai. Then looping north they crossed the so-called Humboldt Range of the Kunlun Mountains, and made a way back through Hami, Urumchi, and Yarkand. The expedition ended in Ladakh, reached by a more northerly route than on the outbound journey, and the Karakorum pass.

For his leadership of this expedition, Carey was awarded the Founder's Medal of the Royal Geographical Society in 1889.

== Later life ==
Carey was Commissioner of Customs, Salt, Opium and Abkari, 1891. In 1891–2 he was in Lisbon, involved in the Goa Treaty negotiations, at the time of the Anglo-Portuguese Treaty of 1891. He retired from the Indian Civil Service in 1893, and went to live in Switzerland. He died on 11 June 1936, at age 91.
