= William Richard Mead =

British geographer (1915–2014)

William Richard Mead (1915–2014) was a British geographer, known for work on Scandinavia and North America.

== Life ==
He was the son of William Mead, a grocer in Aylesbury and his first wife, Sarah Catherine Stevens, who died in 1918. He was educated at Aylesbury Grammar School. During teacher training at the College of St Mark and St John in London, he worked for an external degree of the University of London. He graduated in 1937, and went on to take a research master's degree involving the trade of Finland. He travelled there in 1938, and completed his master's in 1939.

Mead joined the Royal Air Force in autumn 1939 as a volunteer. In 1940 he was posted to Mount Hope, Hamilton, Ontario, in an administrative role. In 1943 he moved back to England working for the Royal Air Force Educational Service. He was demobilised in 1946.

Completing a London Ph.D. interrupted by the war, Mead took a lecturing position at the University of Liverpool under Henry Clifford Darby. With a grant from the Rockefeller Foundation, he did fieldwork to investigate displaced families of East Karelia.

In the wake of Darby, Mead moved to University College London, where he settled for the rest of his career. He became professor in 1961. Head of the geography department in 1966, he retired in 1981. He received many academic honours, and became a fellow of the British Academy. He was a member of the Norwegian Academy of Science and Letters from 1976. He was President of the Geographical Association in 1981.

In retirement, Mead lived in Aston Clinton. He died, unmarried, on 20 July 2014 at Stoke Mandeville Hospital, aged 98.
