= Mountain research =

Study of mountain environments

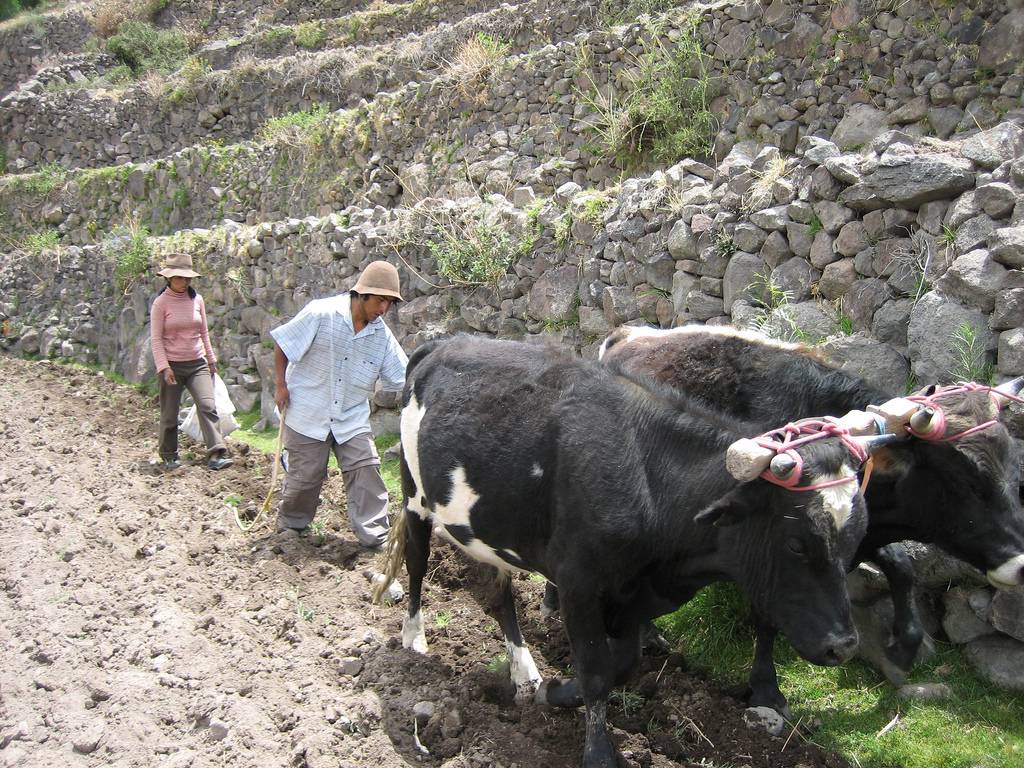
Human-environmental relations in the Peruvian Andes.

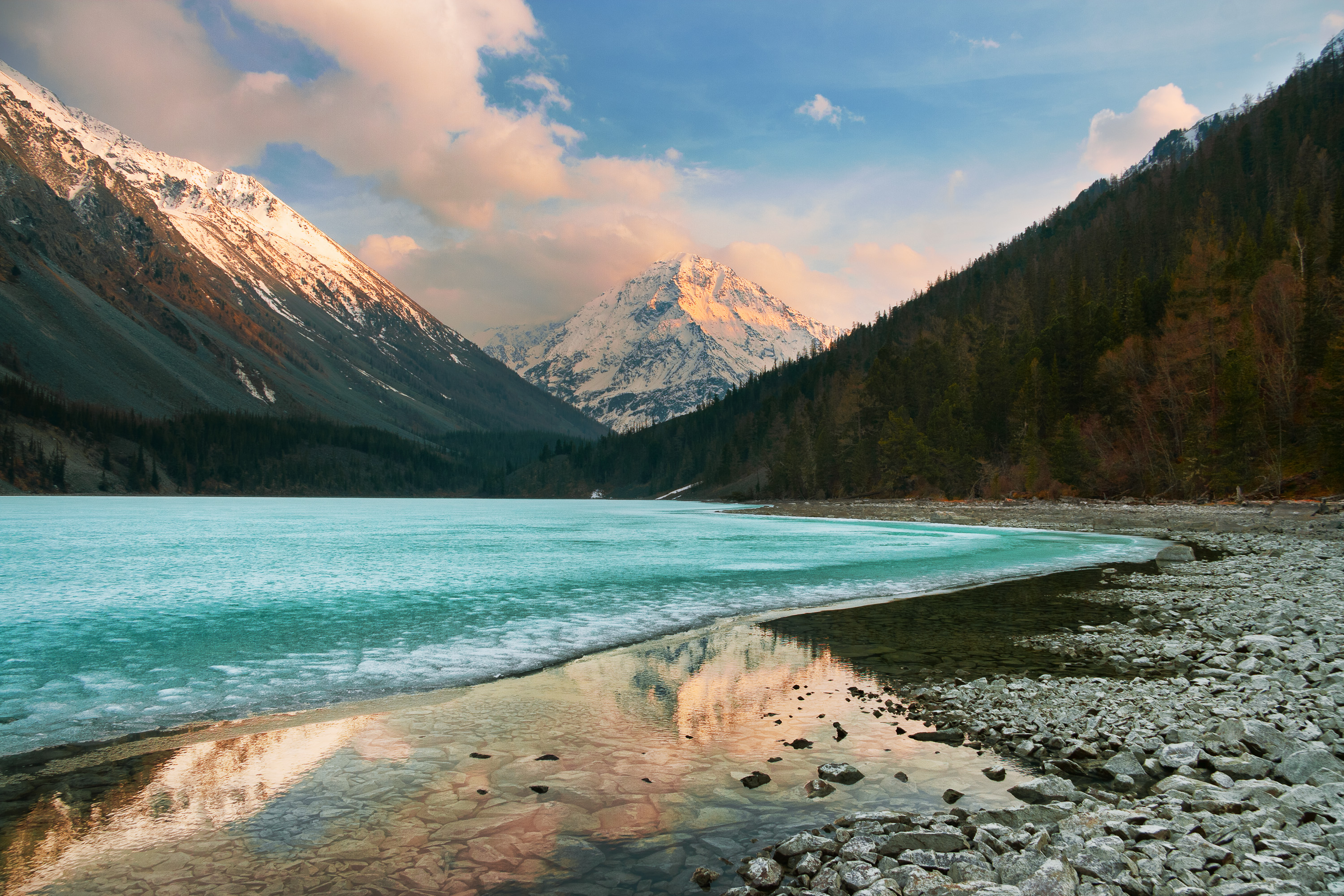
Lake Kucherla in the Altai Mountains.

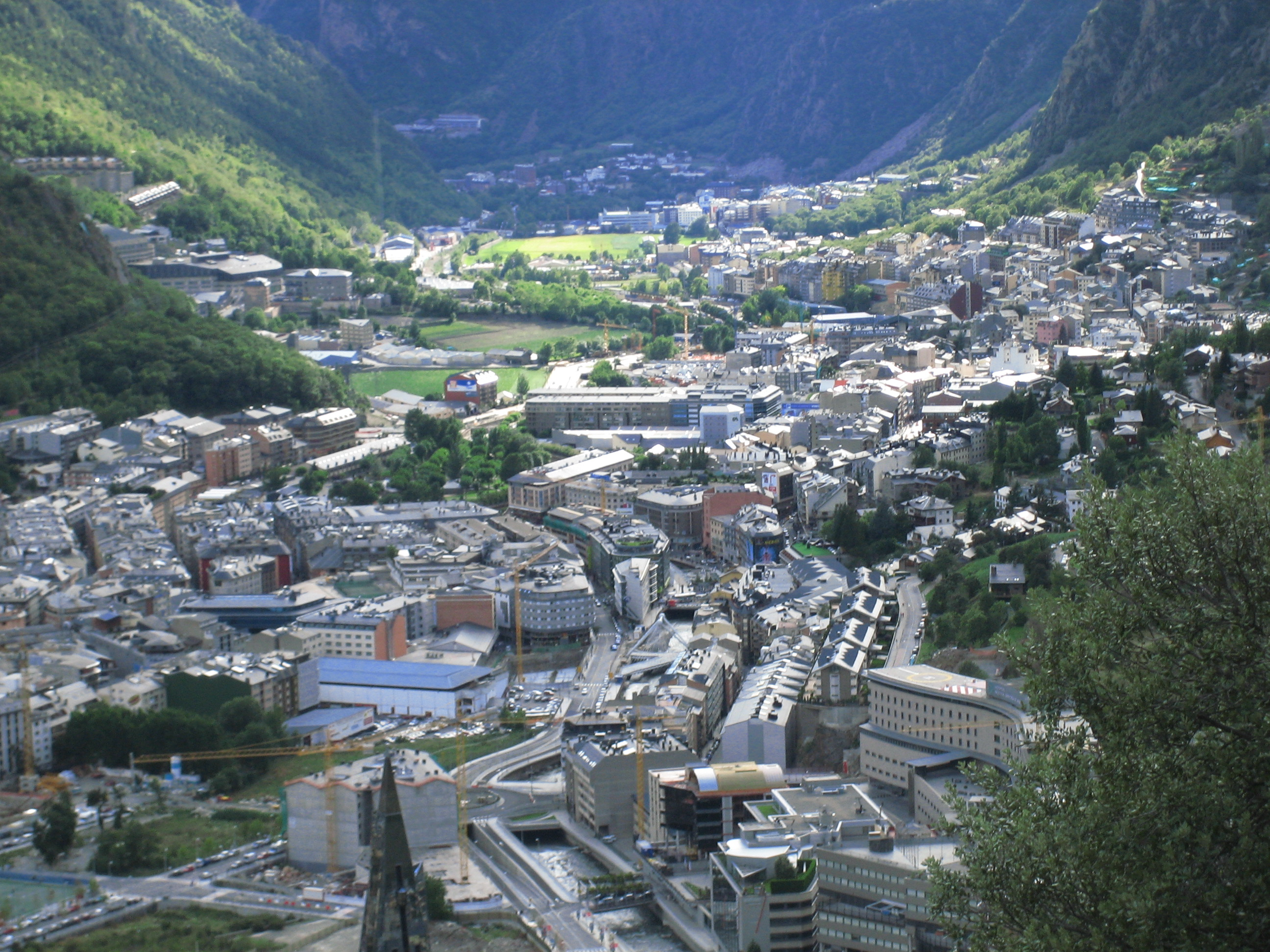
Andorra la Vella, a mountain state's capital in the Pyrenees.

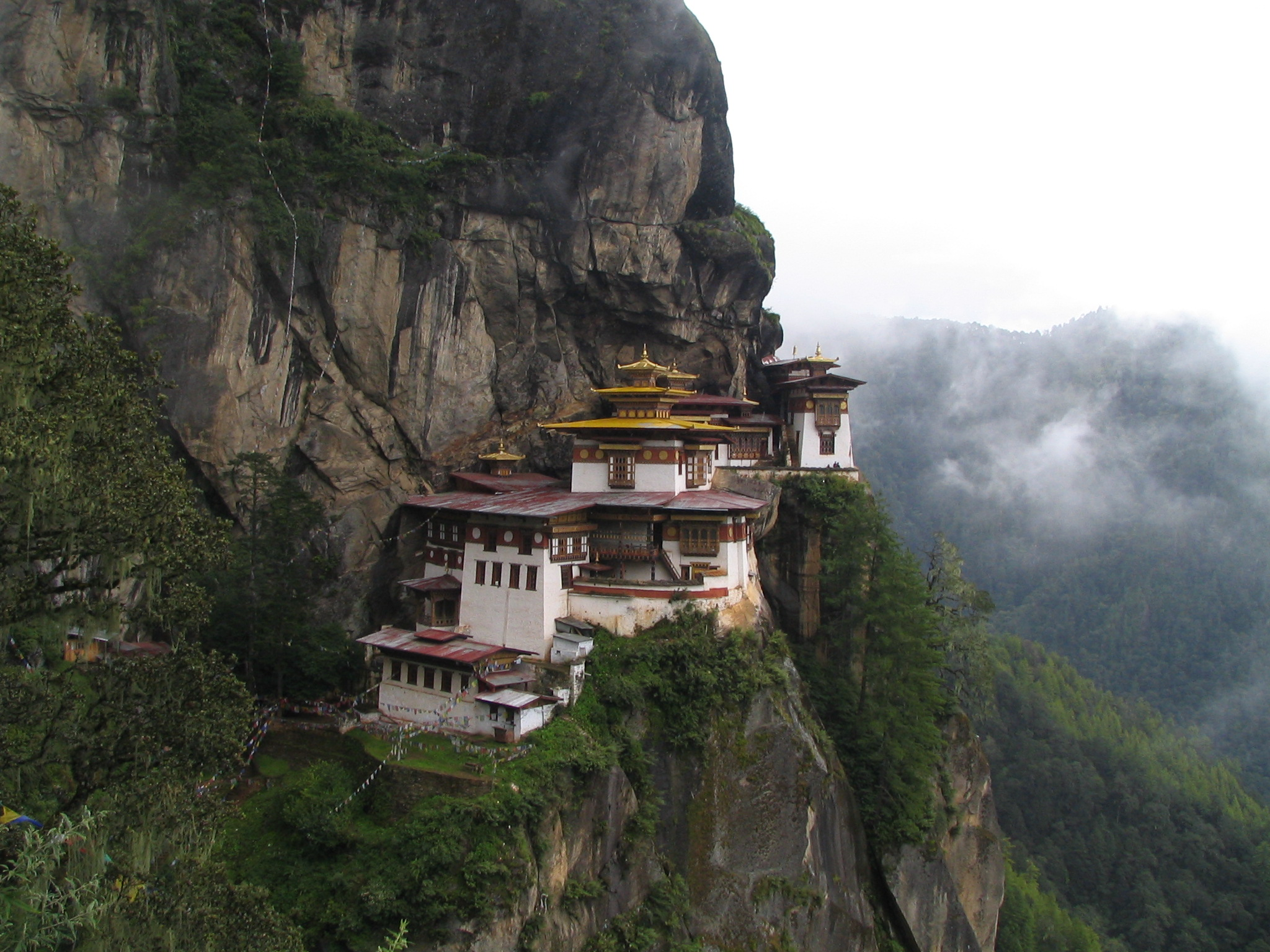
Paro Taktsang, a Himalayan monastery in Bhutan.

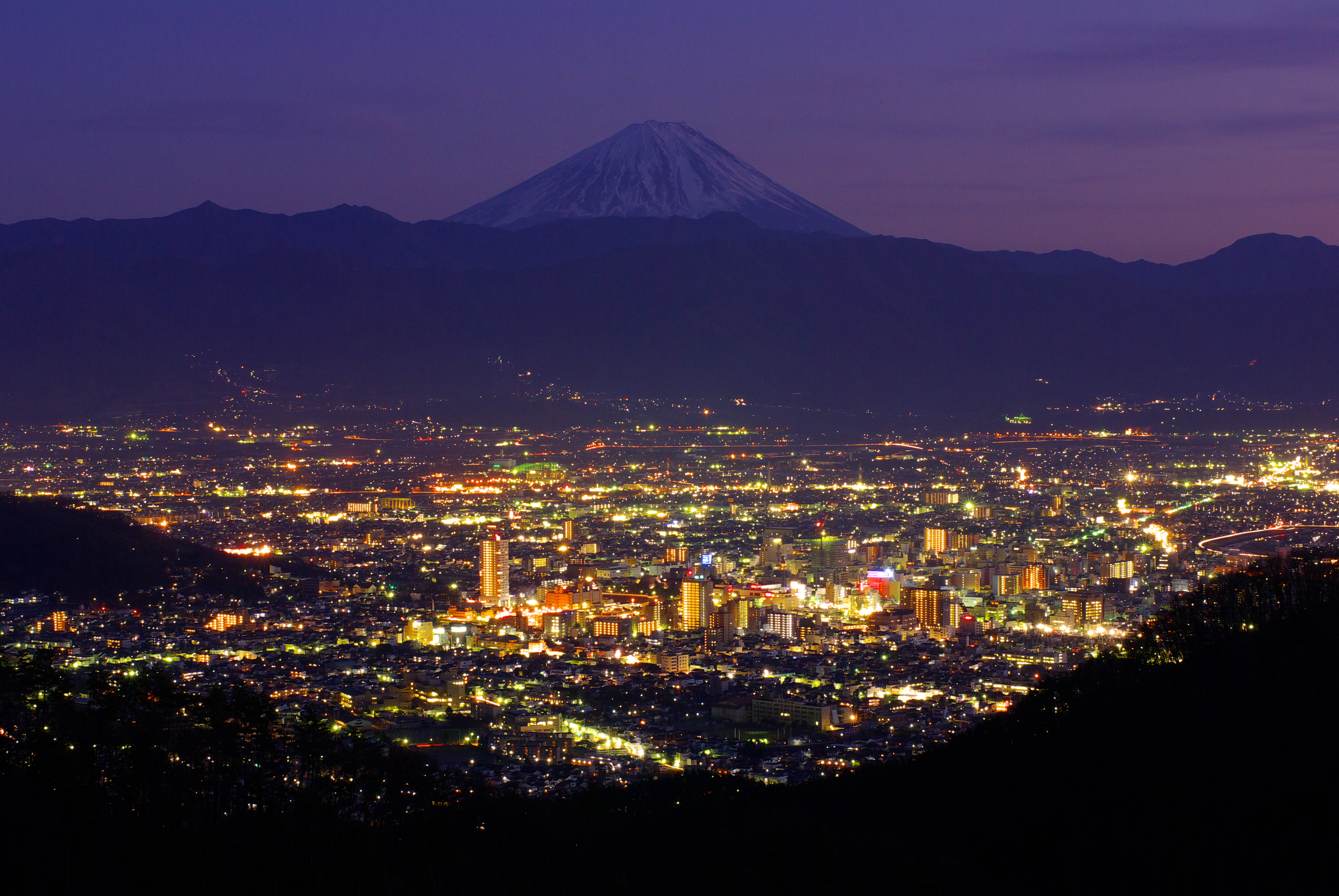
Kōfu, a Japanese mountain city.

Mountain research, traditionally also known as orology (from Greek oros ὄρος for 'mountain' and logos λόγος), is a field of research that regionally concentrates on the Earth's surface's part covered by mountain environments.

== Mountain areas ==
Different approaches have been developed to define mountainous areas. While some use an altitudinal difference of 300 m inside an area to define that zone as mountainous, others consider differences of 1000 m or more, depending on the areas' latitude. Additionally, some include steepness to define mountain regions, hence excluding high plateaus (e.g. the Andean Altiplano or the Tibetan Plateau), zones often seen to be mountainous. A more pragmatic but useful definition has been proposed by the Italian Statistics Office ISTAT, which classifies municipalities as mountainous

- if at least 80% of their territory is situated above ≥ 600 m above sea level, and/or
- if they have an altitudinal difference of 600 m (or more) within their administrative boundaries.

The United Nations Environmental Programme has produced a map of mountain areas worldwide using a combination of criteria, including regions with

- elevations from 300 to 1000 m and local elevation range > 300 m;
- elevations from 1000 to 1500 m and slope ≥ 5° or local elevation range > 300 m;
- elevations from 1500 to 2500 m and slope ≥ 2°;
- elevations of 2500 m or more.

== Focus ==
=== Broader definition ===
In a broader sense, mountain research is considered any research in mountain regions: for instance disciplinary studies on Himalayan plants, Andean rocks, Alpine cities, or Carpathian people. It is comparable to research that concentrates on the Arctic and Antarctic (polar research) or coasts (coastal research).

=== Narrower definition ===
In a narrower sense, mountain research focuses on mountain regions, their description and the explanation of the human-environment interaction in (positive) and the sustainable development of (normative) these areas. So-defined mountain research is situated at the nexus of natural sciences, social sciences and humanities. Drawing on Alexander von Humboldt's work in the Andean realm, mountain geography and ecology are considered core areas of study; Nevertheless important contributions are coming from anthropology, geology, economics, history or spatial planning.

One definition of mountain science was given by the Romanian professor Radu Rey in 1985 in the book Mountain Civilization, as follows:

Mountain science can be defined as representing the study of socio-economic, human, technical and technological phenomena regarding man-nature relationships in mountain systems (specific to mountainous regions), aiming at the conceptualization and promotion of ways (methods, techniques, variants) of their optimized development. It integrates knowledge (disciplines) from fields such as agriculture, animal husbandry, human ecology, geoecology and pedology, biology, demography and ethnography, human and animal psychology, architecture, construction and building materials, elements of forestry and geology, beekeeping, fish farming, economics, the organization and operation of the private mountain household, as well as other specific systems, mountain systematization, mountain design, specific ergonomics, small/large industries and crafts, tourism and agro-tourism, hygienic-sanitary education, material natural resources (minerals, plants, animals) and energy (unconventional), legislation and legal relations, specifically mountain, human resources - tradition and culture.

In sum, narrowly defined mountain research applies an interdisciplinary and integrative regional approach. Slaymaker summarizes:

The science of montology [...] starts with recognition of the importance of verticality, a distinctive feature of mountain regions, which imposes vertical control of the production system; marginality, which results from low agricultural potential; centrality of mechanisms of power and violence; population growth and expansion; and religion and myth, expressed in mountains as sacred places. Montology emphasises restoration ecology to include re-vegetation, rehabilitation, reclamation and recovery of the lost landscape form and function [...]. Landscape ecological effects are arranged along altitudinal belts and form the basis for a more comprehensive understanding of critical habitats for conservation and development. This approach has an underlying assumption of climax communities each fitting into a narrow altitudinal band.

== Denomination ==
Mountain research or orology—not to be confused with orography—, is sometimes denominated mountology. This term stems from Carl Troll's mountain geoecology—geoecology being Troll's English translation of the German Landschaftsökologie—and appeared at a meeting in Cambridge, Massachusetts in 1977. Since then, scholars such as Jack D. Ives, Bruno Messerli and Robert E. Rhoades have claimed the development of montology as interdisciplinary mountain research. The term montology was included in the Oxford English Dictionary in 2002. It defines montology as:

The study of mountains; specifically the interdisciplinary study of the physical, chemical, geological, and biological aspects of mountain regions; (also) the study of the lifestyles and economic concerns of people living in these regions.

On the one hand, the term montology received criticism due to the mix of Latin (mōns, pl. montēs) and Greek (logos). On the other hand, however, this is also the—well accepted—case in several, already established disciplines such as glaciology or sociology.

== Mountain research journals ==
The following list includes peer-reviewed journals that have a focus on mountain research and are open to both the natural and social sciences:

Journals covered by citation indices
Mountain Research and Development	indexed in SCOPUS, Web of Science (SCIE); articles in English; official website
Journal of Mountain Science	indexed in SCOPUS, Web of Science (SCIE); articles in English; official website
Journal of Alpine Research / Revue de géographie alpine	indexed in SCOPUS, Web of Science (SSCI); articles in English, French, German, Italian, Spanish; official website
eco.mont	indexed in SCOPUS, Web of Science (SCIE); articles in English; official website
Appalachian Journal	indexed in SCOPUS, Web of Science (AHCI); articles in English; official website
Pirineos	indexed in SCOPUS; articles in English, Spanish; official website
Histoire des Alpes – Storia delle Alpi – Geschichte der Alpen	indexed in SCOPUS; articles in French, Italian, German; official website
HIMALAYA	indexed in SCOPUS; articles in English; official website
Устойчивое развитие горных территорий / Sustainable Development of Mountain Territories	indexed in SCOPUS, RSCI; articles in Russian, English; official website
Revista de Investigaciones Altoandinas	indexed in Web of Science (ESCI), SciELO Citation Index; articles in Spanish, English; official website
Journals not covered by citation indices
Bulletin de l’Institut français d’études andines	articles in Spanish, French; official website
Himalayan Journal of Sciences	articles in English; official website
Revista Andina	articles in Spanish; official website
L’Italia Forestale e Montana / Italian Journal of Forest and Mountain Environments	articles in English, Italian; official website
Beskydy – The Beskids Bulletin	articles in English; official website
Journal of Mountain Agriculture on the Balkans	articles in Bulgarian, English; official website
Mountain Research	articles in Chinese; official website
The Research Journal of Mountains: Biodiversity, Landscapes and Cultures	articles in English; official website

== Mountain research personalities ==
- Nigel J. R. Allen
- Yuri P. Badenkov
- Werner Bätzing
- Axel Borsdorf
- Philippe Bourdeau
- Bernard Debarbieux
- Veronica della Dora
- Olivier Dollfus
- Don C. Funnel
- Donald A. Friend
- Daniel W. Gade
- José M. García Ruiz
- Stephan Halloy
- Lawrence S. Hamilton
- Hans Hurni
- Jack D. Ives
- Hans Kinzl
- Thomas Kohler
- Wilhelm Lauer
- Elisabeth Lichtenberger
- Bruno Messerli
- Dorothy Jane Pratt
- Roderick Peattie
- Martin F. Price
- Robert E. Rhoades
- Fausto O. Sarmiento
- Jörg Stadelbauer
- Olav Slaymaker
- David Smethurst
- Christoph Stadel
- Carl Troll

== See also ==
- Mountain Research and Development
- Journal of Mountain Science
- eco.mont – Journal on Protected Mountain Areas Research and Management
- Mountain Partnership
