= Hans Bobek =

Austrian geographer

Hans Bobek (17 May 1903, in Klagenfurt – 15 February 1990, in Vienna) was an Austrian geographer. After his studies in geography at the University of Innsbruck, where Johann Sölch—a pupil of Albrecht Penck in Vienna—was his main teacher, he became professor of geography at the University of Vienna (1951–1971). Bobek is noted for his works on cultural and social geography, urban geography as well as on the regional geography of the Near and Middle East, then primarily known as the "Orient". He was, among others, the author of Iran: Probleme eines unterentwickelten Landes alter Kultur. His theory about rural and urban interactions was called Rentenkapitalismus; another important output was the theory of cultural steps (Kulturstufentheorie).

Bobek was elected a member of the Austrian Academy of Sciences in 1953 and the Bavarian Academy of Sciences and Humanities in 1968. In 1978, he received an honorary doctorate from the Ruhr University Bochum. He was awarded the Busk Medal by the Royal Geographical Society in 1981.

== Works ==
=== Monographs ===
- Bobek, H. (1928): Innsbruck - Eine Gebirgsstadt, ihr Lebensraum und ihre Erscheinung, Engelhorn, Stuttgart, 152 p.
- Bobek, H. (1951): Die natürlichen Wälder und Gehölzfluren Irans, Bonner geographische Abhandlungen 8, Bonn, 62 p.
- Bobek, H. (1952): Südwestdeutsche Studien, Forschungen zur deutschen Landeskunde 62, Remagen, 67 p.
- Bobek, H. (1959): Features and Formation of the Great Kavir and Masileh, Teheran, 63 p.
- Bobek, H. (1962): Iran - Probleme eines unterentwickelten Landes alter Kultur, Diesterweg, Frankfurt a.o., 74 p.
- Bobek, H. and E. Lichtenberger (1966): Wien - Bauliche Gestalt und Entwicklung seit der Mitte des 19. Jahrhunderts, Böhlau, Graz a. Cologne, 394 p.

=== Selected articles ===
- Bobek, H. (1927): Grundfragen der Stadtgeographie. Geographischer Anzeiger 28, p. 213–224.
- Bobek, H. (1948): Stellung und Bedeutung der Sozialgeographie. Erdkunde 2, p. 118–125.
- Bobek, H. and J. Schmithüsen (1949): Die Landschaft im logischen System der Geographie. Erdkunde 3, p. 112–120.
- Bobek, H. (1959): Die Hauptstufen der Gesellschafts- und Wirtschaftsentfaltung in geographischer Sicht. Die Erde 90, p. 259–298.
- Bobek, H. (1962): The main stages in socio-economic evolution from a geographical point of view. In: Wagner, P.L. and M.W. Mikesell (eds.): Readings in Cultural Geography, Chicago, p. 218–247. (English translation of the former)
