= Jack D. Ives =

Canadian montologist (1931–2024)

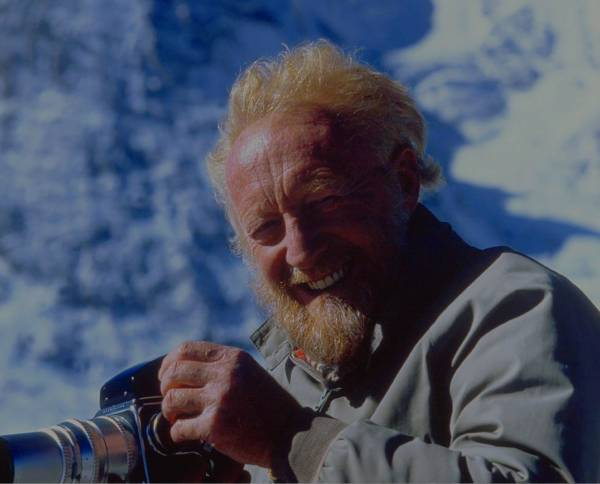
- Ives in 1993
- Born: October 15, 1931; Grimsby, England
- Died: September 15, 2024 (aged 92); Ottawa, Ontario, Canada
- Occupation: Professor of geography
- Spouse: Pauline Angela H. Cordingley
- Children: 4
- Awards: Gold medal of King Albert I Memorial Foundation, 2002; Patron's Medal of the Royal Geographical Society, 2006; Knight's Cross of the Order of the Falcon, Iceland, 2007; Sir Edmund Hillary Mountain Legacy Medal, 2015

Academic background
- Education: University of Nottingham, B.A,., (1953) McGill University, Montreal, Ph D., (1956)
- Doctoral advisor: Brian Bird (McGill)
- Other advisor: Cuchlaine King (University of Nottingham)
- Influences: Ragnar Stefánsson, Carl Troll, Walther Manshard

Academic work
- Discipline: Geography
- Sub-discipline: montology
- Institutions: McGill University, University of Colorado at Boulder, University of California at Davis
- Main interests: sustainable stewardship of mountain communities and environment
- Notable works: Himalayan Dilemma: Reconciling development and conservation
- Notable ideas: instantaneous glacierization; debunking of so-called Theory of Himalayan Environmental Degradation; global prioritization of montological issues

Jack D. Ives (October 15, 1931 – September 15, 2024) was a British-born Canadian montologist, an honorary adjunct research professor of geography and environmental studies at Carleton University in Ottawa, Ontario, Canada, an author, and a prominent advocate of mountain issues at the global level. He was formerly director of the Institute of Arctic and Alpine Research at the University of Colorado, Boulder, founding editor of two peer-reviewed journals, chair of the Commission on High Altitude Geoecology under the auspices of the International Geographical Union, and a senior advisor on mountain ecology and sustainable development for United Nations University.

== Background and education ==
Ives was born in Grimsby, England, on October 15, 1931. In 1947 and 1948, as a high school student at Clee Grammar School, he traveled by trawler to Arctic Norway, his first exposure to the landscapes that would shape his career. He studied geography at the University of Nottingham, and organized that institution's first undergraduate glaciological expeditions to Iceland, leading groups of students to Skaftafell and Vatnajökull in 1952, 1953, and 1954. On 11 September 1954, immediately after witnessing a jökulhlaup (also known as a glacial lake outburst flood, or GLOF) at Skeiðará, Ives married Pauline Angela H. Cordingley. They then emigrated to Canada, where Ives obtained a doctorate in geography from McGill University, Montreal in 1956. Since Jack retired from his position at the University of California in 1997, the Ives have lived in Ottawa; they have four adult children and five grandchildren.

== Career ==
Ives began his career as a geomorphologist, with particular interest in glaciated and periglacial landscapes. His focus broadened over the years, and he became an advocate for both conservation and for equitable policies regarding the interests of indigenous stakeholders. González-Trueba and García-Ruiz conclude that "The contribution of Professor Ives to the study, knowledge, protection and development of mountain areas is incalculable."

=== Canada ===
From 1956 to 1957 Ives served as a research associate at the McGill Subarctic Research Station (MSARS) in Schefferville, Quebec. Along with his wife Pauline, he explored the Labrador-Ungava Peninsula, with the result that he was able to overturn the current hypothesis about the repeated growth and disappearance of ice sheets in northeastern North America during the Quaternary period. Specifically, Richard Foster Flint had argued that the North American ice sheet originated in the Torngat mountains, accumulating in the coastal zone and then spreading westward down the inland slopes of the Torngats; this scenario would have been a mirror image of the well-documented model of glaciation in northern Europe. Based on geomorphological evidence, as well as on his perception that the so-called Torngat Mountain Range is actually an escarpment on the edge of a tilted peneplain with almost no western slopes, Ives refuted the previous model, proposing instead that inception of glaciation occurred across wide areas of the plateau as climate change permitted year-round snow cover to accumulate, a process he refers to as instantaneous glacierization.

On completion of his doctorate, Ives was appointed assistant professor in McGill's Department of Geography, and, from 1957 to 1960, he served as field director of McGill Subarctic Research Station, where he initiated field research programs on permafrost and on the glaciation and deglaciation of Labrador-Ungava.

From 1960 to 1967 Ives was assistant director and then director of the Geographical Branch of Canada's Department of Energy, Mines and Resources in Ottawa. In that capacity he coordinated seven interdisciplinary expeditions to Baffin Island.

=== Boulder, Colorado ===
From 1967 to 1979 Ives served as director of the Institute of Arctic and Alpine Research, University of Colorado, Boulder, and professor of geography from 1967 to 1989. In 1968 Carl Troll founded the Commission on High Altitude Geoecology under the auspices of the International Geographical Union, and invited Ives to join the organizing committee. In alternation with his collaborator Bruno Messerli, Ives served as president of that Commission from 1972 to 1980 and 1988–1996.

While at Boulder, Ives founded and edited two peer-reviewed quarterly journals. Arctic and Alpine Research first appeared in 1969. In 1980 Ives, along with Roger Barry, Misha Plam, and Walther Manshard, founded the International Mountain Society (IMS). The society's stated purpose was: "...to strive for a better balance between mountain environment, development of resources, and the well-being of mountain peoples.." The IMS functioned as publisher of record for Mountain Research and Development, which 1981 Jack founded, and with Pauline edited, in 1981. Jack served as president of the IMS from 1980 to 2000.

In 1973 Ives participated in the first meeting of the UNESCO Man and the Biosphere Programme (MAB) Project 6 - Mountains, and was elected chair of the MAB-6 International Working Group, which started the ball rolling for the establishment in 1983 of the International Centre for Integrated Mountain Development (ICIMOD) in Kathmandu, Nepal. In 1979 the INSTAAR alpine research area at Niwot Ridge was designated a UNESCO Biosphere Reserve.

From 1978 to 2000, Ives served as Research Coordinator for the United Nations University's project on Highland-Lowland Interactive Systems, later to be renamed Mountain Geoecology and Sustainable Development, which entailed fieldwork in the Himalayas, northern Thailand, Yunnan (China), Tajikistan, and Ecuador.

In 1982 and 1986, Ives was the primary organizer of the Mohonk Mountain conferences at Mohonk Mountain House in New York, sponsored by the UNU and the Mohonk Foundation. One result of the conferences was the publication of The Himalayan Dilemma (Ives and Messerli, 1989), which challenged the popular theory according to which highland population growth and poor land management by uneducated farmers was leading to catastrophic deforestation of the Himalayas.

=== Davis, California ===
Beginning in 1989 Ives served as full professor and chair of the Department of Geography at the University of California, Davis. In 1993, after the disestablishment of the Geography Department, he transferred to the UC Davis Division of Environmental Studies.

A chain reaction had been set in motion by the 1982 and 1986 Mohonk Mountain Conferences. UN Under-Secretary General Maurice Strong, who had served as Honorary Chair of Mohonk II, became the Secretary General of the 1992 Rio de Janeiro Earth Summit, also known as the United Nations Conference on Environment and Development (UNCED). Strong supported the proposals that had grown out of the Mohonk Mountain conferences, elaborated in publications by Jack Ives (notably The Himalayan Dilemma), and promoted by a group known formally as Mountain Agenda, but also referred to as the Mountain Mafia. Their vision of a world awakened to the importance and fragility of mountains was shaped in part by the success of ocean advocate Jacques Cousteau (who was also invited to the Earth Summit), and by the UNU's semi-autonomous World Institute for Development Economics Research (WIDER).

Mountain Agenda prepared for the Rio Summit a 400-page book, State of the World's Mountains: A Global Report and a 44-page summary booklet, An Appeal for the Mountains. Ives with Bruno Messerli and colleges organized the inclusion of "Chapter 13 — Managing Fragile Ecosystems — Sustainable Mountain Development" in its final publication, Agenda 21.

The message of Chapter 13 has echoed for the ensuing three decades. A new hardcover volume was produced, Mountains of the World: A Global Priority ( Messerli and Ives, ed. 1997). It was produced as the centerpiece of the review of Chapter 13 in 1997 at the Rio-Plus-Five at United Nations headquarters in New York City. Among the recommendations for mountain research and stewardship in the volume is Ives' proposal for the "creation of a montology — a science that is sensitive to mountain policy" — an "interdisciplinary, intercontinental, intersectoral" field (p. 464) responsive to the complexities of the challenges and opportunities inherent in mountains. Meanwhile, dozens of new governmental offices for mountain stewardship and non-governmental agencies, all focusing on the "people mountain interface" had been established around the world. On 11 December 2001, Ives, representing Dr. Hans J. A. van Ginkel, Rector of United Nations University, delivered a keynote address to the United Nations General Assembly. The United Nations General Assembly declared 2002 International Year of the Mountain, in observance of the 10-year anniversary of the Rio Earth Summit, and December 11 itself was designated the annual International Mountain Day going forward. Since then, the mountain agenda articulated in 1992 has become entrenched at all functional levels, from grassroots activism, to national policy and global programs.

== Later life and death ==
After retiring from UC Davis, Ives returned to Ottawa, Canada, where he was appointed honorary research professor of geography and environmental studies by Carleton University. In his last two decades, Ives authored five monographs and numerous shorter works.

Ives died in Ottawa, Canada on September 15, 2024, at the age of 92.

== Major works ==
The following is a list of books either authored or edited by Jack D. Ives.

- (with Roger Barry) Arctic and Alpine Environments, London and NY: Methuen, 1974, ISBN 0-416-65980-2
- Geoecology of the Colorado Front Range: A Study of Alpine and Subalpine Environments, Boulder, CO: Westview, 1980, ISBN 0-89158-993-7
- (with Bruno Messerli) The Himalayan Dilemma: Reconciling development and conservation, London and NY: Routledge, 1989, ISBN 0-415-01157-4
- (with Bruno Messerli) Mountains of the World: A global priority, New York and Carforth (UK): Parthenon, 1997, ISBN 1-85070-781-2; also published hardcover in German, French, Spanish, Russian and Chinese
- Himalayan Perceptions: Environmental Change and the Well-Being of Mountain Peoples, London and NY: Routledge, 2004, ISBN 978-1-13886-713-0
- Skaftafell in Iceland: A thousand years of change, Reykjavik, Iceland: Ormstunga, 2007, ISBN 978-9979-63-055-5
- Skaftafell Í Öræfum: Íslands þúsund ár, Reykjavik, Iceland: Ormstunga, 2007, ISBN 978-9979-63-055-5
- The Land Beyond: A Memoir, Fairbanks, Alaska: University of Alaska Press, 2010, ISBN 978-1-60223-077-4
- Environmental Change and Challenge in the Himalaya: A historical perspective
- Sustainable Mountain Development: Getting the Facts Right, Kathmandu, Nepal: Himalayan Association for the Advancement of Science, 2013, ISBN 978-9-937-26195-1
- Baffin Island: Field Research and High Arctic Adventure, 1961-1967, Calgary, Alberta: University of Calgary, 2016, ISBN 978-1-55238-829-7; 2017 PubWest Book Design Silver Award Winner for Historical or Biographical Book

== Honors and awards ==
- Guggenheim Fellowship, 1976
- Mel Marcus Distinguished Career Award, Geomorphology Specialty Group of the American Association of Geographers (AAG), 2000
- Distinguished Career Award, Mountain Geography Specialty Group of the American Association of Geographers (AAG), 2000
- King Albert Mountain Award, 2002
- Patron's Medal of the Royal Geographical Society, 2006
- Knight's Cross of the Order of the Falcon, Iceland, 2007
- Sir Edmund Hillary Mountain Legacy Medal, 2015
- A Festschrift was published in his honor in 2016: Mainali, Kumar; Sicroff, Seth (eds.). Jack D. Ives, Montologist: Festschrift for a Mountain Advocate. Himalayan Association for the Advancement of Science. pp. 94–97. ISBN 978-9937-0-1567-7.
