= AAAR =

AAAR may refer to:

- Autshumato Anti-Aircraft Regiment
- Arctic, Antarctic, and Alpine Research, an open-access journal
