= Dollfus =

Dollfus is French surname, originally from the Alsace region. It may refer to:

- Adrien Dollfus (1858–1921), French carcinologist
- Audouin Dollfus (1924–2010), French astronomer and aeronaut
- Gustave Frédéric Dollfus (1850–1931), French geologist and malacologist
- Jean Dollfus (1800–1887), French industrialist
- Maurice Dollfus (1885–1972), French businessman, executive for Ford Motor Company of France
- Olivier Dollfus (1931–2005), French geographer
- Robert-Philippe Dollfus (1887–1976), French zoologist and parasitologist

== See also ==
- 2451 Dollfus, a main-belt asteroid, named for Audouin Dollfus
- Dollfus' stargazer (Uranoscopus dollfusi), a venomous salt-water fish
- Dollfus-Mieg et Compagnie, a French textile company founded by the Dollfus family
- Engelbert Dollfuss (1892–1934), Austrian politician
