= Johann Sölch =

Johann Sölch (16 October 1883 in Penzing, near Vienna – 10 September 1951 in Kitzbühel) was an Austrian geographer, largely known for his geomorphological studies of the Eastern Alps.

He studied under Albrecht Penck at the University of Vienna, and in 1917 received his habilitation for geography at the University of Graz. In 1920 he became a professor of physical geography at the University of Innsbruck, where he founded a seminar for Alpine geography. In 1928 he relocated to the University of Heidelberg, and in 1935 returned to Vienna, where he was named director of the Geographical Institute. In 1947/48 he served as rector of the university.

He served as secretary (mathematics and natural sciences division) of the Austrian Academy of Sciences, and in 1951 was appointed president of the Österreichischen Geographischen Gesellschaft (Austrian Geographical Society). He was awarded an honorary doctorate from the University of Glasgow for his work involving the geography of the British Isles. Sölch Glacier, Antarctica commemorates his name, as does Sölchgasse, a street in the 21st District of Vienna.

Johann Sölch was the mentor and supervisor of Austrian geographers Hans Kinzl and Hans Bobek.

== Selected works ==
- Die Formung der Landoberfläche, 1914 – The formation of the land surface.
- Geographischer Führer durch Nordtirol, 1924 – Geographical guide to North Tirol.
- Die Auffassung der natürlichen Grenze in der wissenschaftlichen Geographie, 1924 – The conception of the natural boundary.
- Die Landformung der Steiermark, 1928 – The formation of the land in Styria.
- Die Ostalpen, 1930 – The eastern Alps.
- Fluss- und eiswerk in den Alpen zwischen Ötztal und St. Gotthard, 1935 – – River and ice formations in the Alps between Ötztal and St. Gotthard.
- Die Semmeringgebiet, 1948 – The Semmering area.
- Die Landschaften der Britischen Inseln, 2 volumes, 1951-52 – The landscapes of the British Isles.
