= Sir Edmund Hillary Mountain Legacy Medal =

The Sir Edmund Hillary Mountain Legacy Medal
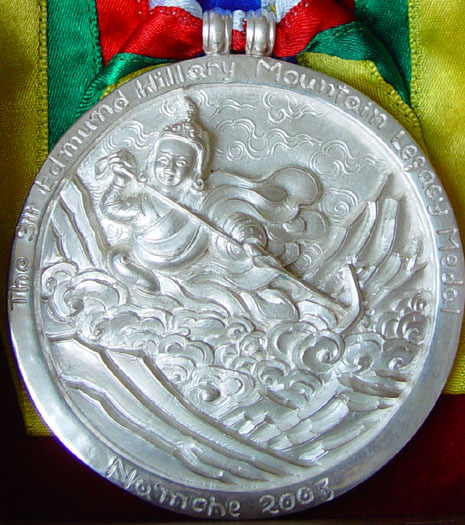
- Awarded for: Awarded for remarkable service in the conservation of culture and nature in mountainous regions
- Country: Nepal
- Presented by: Mountain Legacy
- First award: 2003; 23 years ago
- No. of laureates: 11 medals as of 2019
- Website: www.hillarymedal.org

The Sir Edmund Hillary Mountain Legacy Medal is awarded every one or two years to an individual (rarely, two individuals working as a team) "for remarkable service in the conservation of culture and nature in mountainous regions." The medal both recognizes the service of Sir Edmund Hillary (20 July 1919 – 11 January 2008) on behalf of mountain people and their environment and also encourages the continuing emulation of his example. The Hillary Medal is a project of Mountain Legacy International, a non-profit organization incorporated in New York State; the president is biologist Kumar P. Mainali. The Hillary Medal was personally authorized by Sir Edmund in 2002, and ratified by the Namche Consensus, the declaration resulting from the 2003 Namche Conference: "People, Park, and Mountain Ecotourism."

Hillary Medal presentations have taken place at various venues, including two in Tengboche, Nepal, (2003 and 2008); two in Melbourne, Australia (2006 and 2010); one in Khumjung, Nepal (2011); two in Kathmandu, Nepal (2013 and 2017); and one in Ottawa, Ontario, Canada (2015). The 2017 Sir Edmund Hillary Mountain Legacy Medal was presented to Peruvian engineer César Portocarrero in Kathmandu, on 11 December 2016.

== History ==
As a member of John Hunt's British Everest Expedition, Edmund Hillary earned international fame as a result of his achieving the first ascent of Mount Everest, along with Tenzing Norgay, in what Time magazine has characterized as "the last major earthly adventure and also the last great symbol of [the British] Empire." Reaching the "Top of the World" was one of a series of adventures that brought Hillary world attention; these included the ascent of ten other Himalayan peaks between 1956 and 1965, an expedition to find the yeti; and an expedition to the South Pole as a member of the Commonwealth Trans-Antarctic Expedition in 1958, a jetboat expedition up the Ganges in 1977, and a flight to the North Pole along with Neil Armstrong in 1985.

Starting in the 1960s, Sir Edmund undertook numerous small-scale development projects on behalf of the Sherpa communities of the Solu, Khumbu, Pharak and Rolwaling districts of eastern Nepal. Working with friends, family, and volunteers, Hillary built some 27 schools, 3 airstrips, 2 hospitals, and an indeterminate number of bridges, water supply systems, clinics, and other infrastructure. He founded the Himalayan Trust to facilitate fundraising, and this non-governmental organization (NGO) was joined by Himalayan Trust UK, the Sir Edmund Hillary Foundation (Canada), the American Himalayan Foundation (USA), the Hillary-Stiftung Deutschland (Germany), and other non-profit organizations.

The idea for the Sir Edmund Hillary Mountain Legacy Medal came from the Nepal-based ecotourism and volunteer organization, Bridges: Projects in Rational Tourism Development (Bridges-PRTD), directed by Seth Sicroff. The award was conceived as a means of both honoring the humanitarian accomplishments of Sir Edmund and also encouraging their emulation by others. It was authorized by Sir Edmund himself in December 2002, and formally ratified by the Namche Consensus, the final declaration of the 2003 Namche Conference ("People, Park, and Mountain Ecotourism"). The Nepalese NGO Mountain Legacy was founded to carry out the selection and presentation of Sir Edmund Hillary Mountain Legacy Medals.

== Past recipients ==
2003: Michael Schmitz and Helen Cawley, for renovation of Tengboche Monastery, Khumbu, Nepal

2006: Alton Byers, of West Virginia, USA, for research and development of protected areas in mountainous regions

2008: Anthony "Papa Tony" Freake, for Phortse Community Project, Khumbu, Nepal

2010: Scott MacLennan, for projects in mountain ecosystem conservation, sustainable economic development and support for unique mountain cultures, especially in Nepal

2011: Ang Rita Sherpa, for management of remote mountainous protected areas in Nepal, Central Asia, and South America

2013: Harshwanti Bisht, for her Save Gangotri project in Uttarakhand, India

2015: Jack D. Ives, for wide-ranging accomplishments in protection of mountain ecosystems and cultures, and for leadership in placing mountain issues on the international political agenda

2016: Civil engineer César A. Portocarrero Rodríguez of Huaraz, Peru, for his work in mitigation of Glacial Lake Outburst Flood (GLOF) hazards in Peru

2017: Explorer and anthropologist Johan Reinhard, of West Virginia, USA, for archeological discoveries and scholarship in the Himalayas and the Andes.

2018: Mountain climber and philanthropist Daniel Mazur of Olympia, Washington, USA, for rescue, recovery, and development projects in the Himalayas.

2019: Cultural preservationist and social activist Didar Ali of Gulmit in the Gilgit-Baltistan region of Pakistan, received the Hillary Medal in December 2019 for his work in preserving and promoting the Wakhi language and culture.

2022: Kathryn March and David Holmberg, anthropologists, for their many decades of friendship and assistance to Nepal, and their leadership in educational exchange programs between Tribhuvan University and Cornell University
