= Medieval Worlds: Comparative & Interdisciplinary Studies =

Austrian history journal

Medieval Worlds: Comparative & Interdisciplinary Studies is a biannual peer-reviewed open access academic journal covering Medieval studies, published by the Austrian Academy of Sciences. Its main scope is the time period from roughly 400 to 1500 CE, with a focus on Europe, Asia, and North Africa. The founding editors-in-chief are Walter Pohl and Andre Gingrich. The journal was established in 2015 with initial funding of the Austrian Science Fund.

Scholarly reviewers have found the journal noteworthy for its programmatic efforts to change the parameters of Medieval Studies, making the field less Eurocentric and attempting to integrate it into comparative history, world history, and interdisciplinary history-writing. They noted that it was promoting a new trend for 'wide-ranging comparison on a Eurasian scale' and numbered it among 'initiatives which speak either directly or indirectly to the notion of a global history for the millennium before 1500'. The journal's push for a new interdisciplinarity was particularly noted in a review of its fourth issue, on the historiographical consequences of archaeogenetic research.
