= Gary Ball =

New Zealand mountaineer (died 1993)

Gary Ian Ball (died October 1993) was a New Zealand mountaineer who summited Mount Everest twice, in 1990 and 1992.

== Climbs ==
Ball was a New Zealand Antarctic Division field guide and instructor in survival training at Scott Base in 1976–77 and a field guide in northern Victoria Land for the GANOVEX expedition in 1979–80. He also climbed Aoraki (Mt Cook) 26 times, at that time a record.

In 1989 Ball tried unsuccessfully to climb Mount Everest. In 1990, he summited Mount Everest with Peter Hillary and Rob Hall. They made a call from the summit to a New Zealand television station for an on-air talk during prime time. On return to New Zealand they appeared in parades and gained corporate sponsorships for additional climbs. With Hall, Ball climbed the Seven Summits in seven months in 1990. Together, Ball and Hall founded Adventure Consultants in 1991, and were among the pioneers of guided tours of Mount Everest. Hall and Ball had climbed 16 mountains together and were celebrities in New Zealand for their climbing exploits.

In 1990, Ball was awarded the New Zealand 1990 Commemoration Medal.

In 1992, Ball also attempted K2 but was struck down by a pulmonary embolism. He was rescued from 8,300 metres altitude over the course of several days initially by Rob Hall and later by a team including Dan Mazur, Scott Fischer, Ed Viesturs, Neal Beidleman and Jon Pratt.

== Death ==
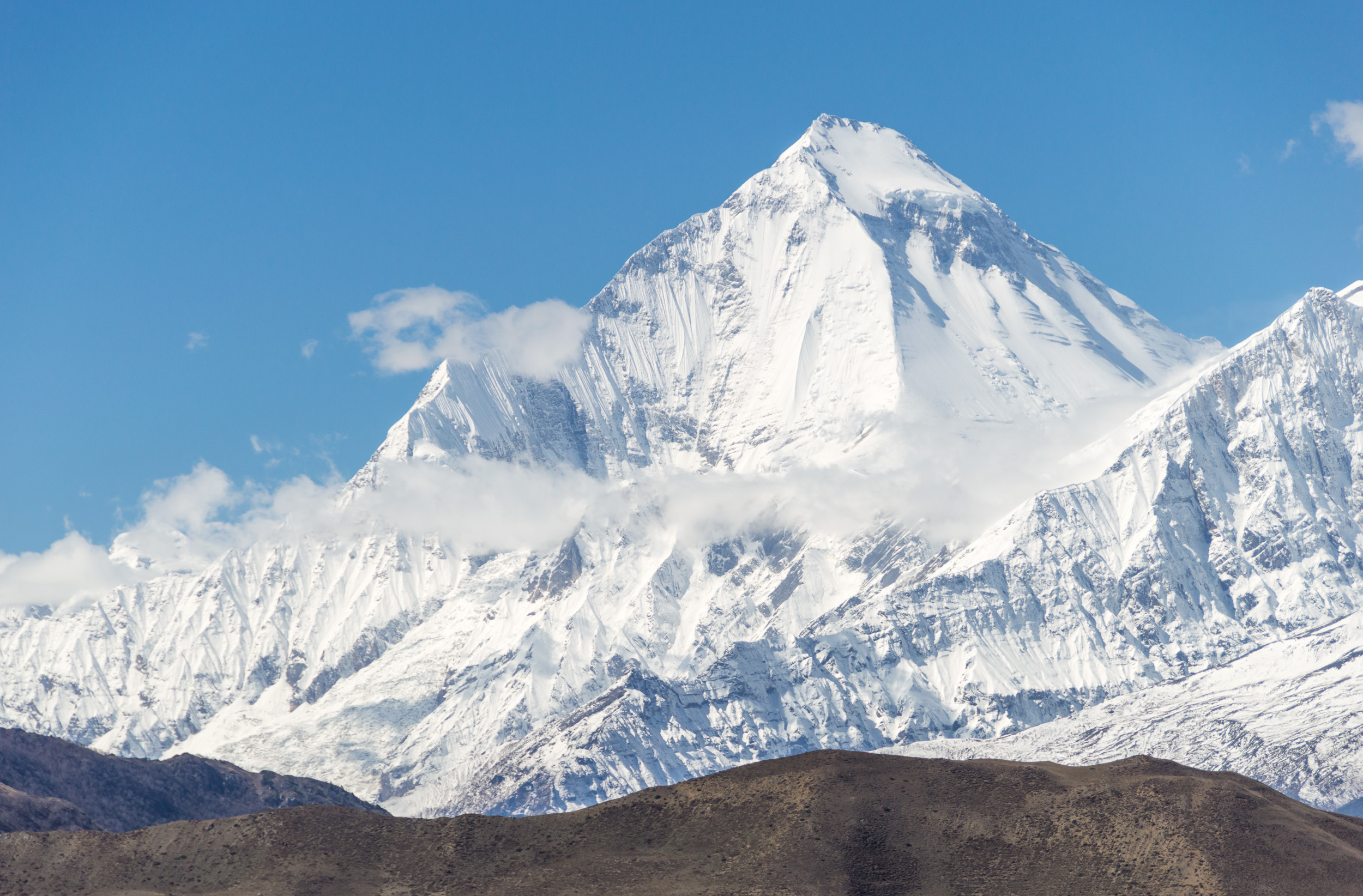
Dhaulagiri

Ball died in October 1993 after coming down with high-altitude pulmonary edema (HAPE) while climbing Himalayan mountain Dhaulagiri with Hall. Rob Hall buried Ball's body in a crevasse on the mountain, and it was rediscovered ten years later. In 2004 his family members planned a trip to re-bury the body.

== Legacy ==
Ball Glacier is a 7 nautical miles (13 km) long glacier in Victoria Land, Antarctica named by the New Zealand Geographic Board after Ball. Ball climbed Mount Lister with an Italian field party in 1976–77, and camped on this glacier; he was field assistant with R.H. Findlay's New Zealand Antarctic Research Program party to this area in 1980–81.

Ball Peak is a mountain named by the New Zealand Geographic Board after Ball. This was related to his time as a New Zealand Antarctic Division field guide and instructor in survival training at Scott Base in 1976–77 and as a field guide in northern Victoria Land for the GANOVEX expedition in 1979–80. Ball Peak is a mountain 1,700 metres (5,600 ft) tall at the head of Loftus Glacier in the Asgard Range, Victoria Land, Antarctica. It stands in proximity to Mount Hall and Harris Peak, with which this naming is associated.
