= Mountain Partnership =

International organization

- Formation: 2002
- Headquarters: Rome, Italy
- Members: (700 members) 75 governments, 25 intergovernmental organizations, 19 subnational authorities, 48 global major group organizations, 535 major group organizations
- Coordinator: Julia Wolf
- Key people: Sara Manuelli, Giorgio Grussu, Antonella Sorrentino, Perla Gonzales Macias
- Website: www.fao.org/mountain-partnership/en/

The Mountain Partnership is a Type II Partnership, dedicated to improving the lives of mountain people and protecting mountain environments around the world.

== History ==
During the preparatory process of the World Summit on Sustainable Development in Johannesberg, South Africa, in 2002, the governments of Italy and Switzerland, the Food and Agriculture Organization (FAO), and the United Nations Environment Programme (UNEP) embarked on an effort to organize a new partnership to strengthen cooperation and more effectively address the needs of mountain peoples and environments around the world. As a result, the International Partnership for Sustainable Development of Mountain Regions, known as the Mountain Partnership, was launched.

== Membership ==
The Mountain Partnership currently comprises 700 members, including governments, intergovernmental organizations and major groups from civil society, NGOs and the private sector.

The following governments are currently members of the Mountain Partnership.

- Afghanistan
- Algeria
- Andorra
- Argentina
- Armenia
- Austria
- Azerbaijan
- Bangladesh
- Bhutan
- Bolivia
- Burundi
- Cameroon
- Chile
- Colombia
- Costa Rica
- Cuba
- (Democratic Republic of the Congo) Democratic Republic of Congo
- Dominican Republic
- Ecuador
- Eswatini
- Ethiopia
- France
- Fiji
- (Georgia (country)) Georgia
- Ghana
- Guatemala
- Guinea
- Haiti
- India
- Indonesia
- Iran
- Italy
- Jamaica
- Jordan
- Kenya
- Kyrgyzstan
- Lesotho
- Liechtenstein
- Madagascar
- Malawi
- Mexico
- Monaco
- Montenegro
- Morocco
- Nepal
- Nigeria
- North Macedonia
- Pakistan
- Panama
- Papua New Guinea
- Peru
- Philippines
- (South Korea) Republic of Korea
- Romania
- Serbia
- Slovakia
- Slovenia
- Spain
- Sri Lanka
- Sudan
- Switzerland
- Tajikistan
- Togo
- Tunisia
- Turkey
- Uganda
- Ukraine
- Uzbekistan
- Venezuela
- Yemen

== Secretariat ==
The Mountain Partnership is supported by a secretariat based at FAO Headquarters in Rome, Italy. The Mountain Partnership Secretariat plays a facilitating role, connecting institutions and helping members develop joint activities to protect mountain regions. It is also responsible for coordinating the annual observance of International Mountain Day and for preparing the United Nations Secretary-General report on sustainable mountain development every three years.

The Mountain Partnership Secretariat is funded by the Italian Ministry of Foreign Affairs, the Ministry of Environment, Agriculture and Sustainability of Andorra, FAO, the Swiss Federal Office for Agriculture, Government of Andorra and the Government of Ireland.

The current Coordinator of the Mountain Partnership Secretariat is Julia Wolf. Past coordinators include Rosalaura Romeo, Thomas Hofer, Yuka Makino, and Doug McGuire.

== Work ==
The work of the Mountain Partnership is spread out among four pillars, namely: advocacy, communications, brokering initiatives and capacity development. The Mountain Partnership works to bring global attention to achieving sustainable development in mountain regions and to promote the inclusion of mountain issues in United Nations declarations and other international documents. Members also engage in disseminating awareness with regards to challenges faced by mountain peoples and environments. Furthermore, the Mountain Partnership’s role is to "facilitate contacts between countries and institutions and creating conditions for partnerships, technical cooperation and resource mobilization at all levels". The scope of the Mountain Partnership is for members to cooperate in order to facilitate, promote and implement initiatives at all levels.

The Mountain Partnership’s main principles are "participation of all members, accountability, responsiveness, consensus, transparency and flexibility". Its Secretariat is crucial for the creation of an enabling environment for main actors to cooperate towards the obtainment of common aims.

In 2012, its members lobbied for sustainable mountain development to be included in The Future We Want, the final outcome document of the Rio+20 United Nations Conference on Sustainable Development, resulting in the inclusion of three paragraphs relating to mountains. The partnership also encourages the development of policies and laws that give local mountain communities a voice in decision-making and organizes conferences, training sessions, workshops and communications materials on sustainable development in mountain areas worldwide.

The Sixth Global Meeting of the Mountain Partnership was convened in Aspen, Colorado, on 27–29 September 2022, with over 200 participants attending. It was the main event of the United Nations International Year of Sustainable Mountain Development 2022. Delegates elected a new Steering Committee for the Mountain Partnership, updated several of the Mountain Partnership’s strategy documents, and endorsed the Aspen Declaration.

== Selected publications ==
- Mountain Partnership Secretariat: Annual report 2024
- Restoring mountain ecosystems - Challenges, case studies and recommendations for implementing the UN Decade Principles for Mountain Ecosystem Restoration
- Understanding and Quantifying Mountain Tourism
- Mountain women of the world – Challenges, resilience and collective power
- Mountain farming systems – seeds for the future
- Vulnerability of mountain peoples to food insecurity: updated data and analysis of drivers
- 15 years of Mountain Partnership

== See also ==
- International Mountain Society
