= Elisabeth Lichtenberger =

Austrian geographer (1925–2017)

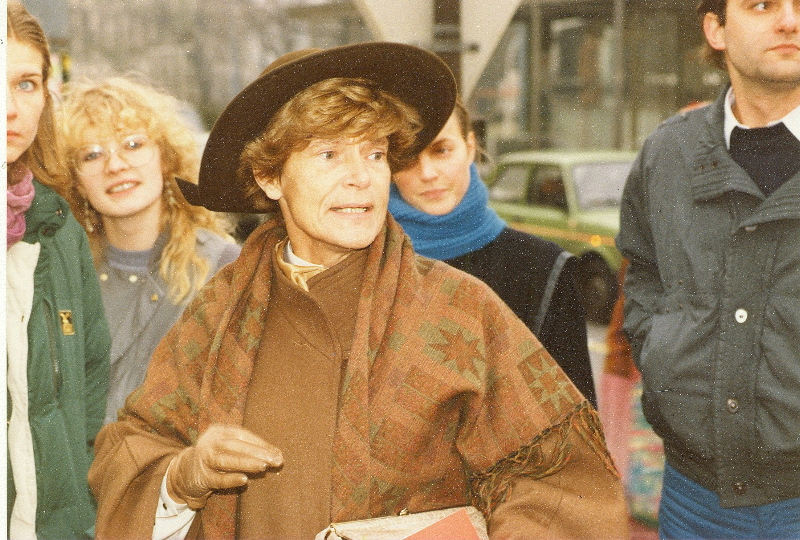
Lichtenberger in 1984

Elisabeth Lichtenberger (17 February 1925 – 14 February 2017) was an Austrian geographer. Her research focus was on urban geography and mountain research, particularly in Central and Eastern Europe and North America. She taught at the University of Vienna, and was awarded the Austrian Decoration for Science and Art in 1999. She was a fellow of the British Academy, a member of Academia Europaea and the Austrian Academy of Sciences, and holder of honorary doctorates from the University of Chicago and Leipzig University.

In 1988, she also founded the Institute for Urban and Regional Research of the Austrian Academy of Sciences in Vienna. She also coordinates the priority program, "Austria. Space and Society" (Österreich. Raum und Gesellschaft) of the Fonds zur Förderung der wissenschaftlichen Forschung (FWF).

From 1985 to 1996 she was president of the Austrian National Committee for the International Geographical Union.

Born in Vienna on 17 February 1925, she died on 14 February 2017, aged 91.
