= Daniel Mazur =

American mountain climber

Daniel Lee Mazur
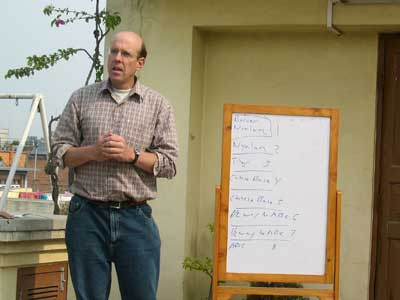

Personal information
- Nationality: American; British
- Born: 1963 (age 62–63) Illinois, USA
- Education: Brandeis University & University of the West of England (PhD); University of Montana (BSW); Missoula Vocational Technical College
- Occupations: Expedition Leader; Philanthropist
- Website: https://www.summitclimb.com/

Climbing career
- Type of climber: Mountaineer
- First ascents: Muztagh Ata via the East Ridge (2000)
- Major ascents: Mount Everest; K2; Makalu; Lhotse
- Known for: High-altitude rescues of Gary Ball, Lincoln Hall, and Rick Allen

Daniel Lee Mazur is a mountaineer, expedition leader, and philanthropist who has ascended nine of the world's highest summits, including Mount Everest and K2. He is also known for several high altitude mountain rescues: the 1991 rescue of Roman Giutashvili from Mount Everest, the rescue of Gary Ball from K2 in 1992, the rescue in 2006 of Australian climber Lincoln Hall from Mount Everest, and the rescue of British mountaineer Rick Allen from Broad Peak in 2018.

Mazur is cited as one of America's "most successful high-altitude climbers" and in 2018 was awarded the Sir Edmund Hillary Mountain Legacy Medal "for remarkable service in the conservation of culture and nature in mountainous regions".

== Early life ==
Mazur grew up in Deerfield, Illinois. His family originate from Bristol, England and Złotów, Poland. Mazur took an interest in mountaineering and the outdoors from a young age, inspired by his grandfather who homesteaded in Montana.

Mazur completed his Bachelor of Social Work from the University of Montana in 1988 and read for his PhD in Social Policy Analysis from Brandeis University at the University of the West of England, with a thesis titled Accessory Dwelling Units: Affordable Apartments, Helping People Who Have Low Income and People Who Are Aging In Single Family Housing.

== Career ==
Mazur has led more than 11 expeditions to Everest and was a leader of Greg Mortenson's team that attempted to summit K2 in 1993, which is featured in the book Three Cups of Tea. Mazur was a member of the team that summitted K2 on 2 September 1993 with the first British climber to survive the complete expedition, Jonathan Pratt. The team was the first British ascent of the West Ridge route, and the second overall British ascent of the mountain. Mazur completed the first ascent of Muztagh Ata via the East Ridge with Jon Otto and Walter Keller in July 2000. He was noted for tweeting live updates from Everest Camp 1 during the April 2015 Nepal earthquake.

== Rescue cases ==
=== Roman Giutashvili rescue ===
In 1991, during an expedition that summited Mount Everest with Anatoli Boukreev, Mazur was involved in the rescue of Georgian climber Roman Giutashvili. Mazur gave Giutashvili his oxygen and dug him into a snow hole after the Georgian had collapsed at 8:05pm on the descent. Mazur left Giutashvili to descend and find help, ultimately resulting in his rescue. Giutashvili later revealed to Mazur that he had lived with only one lung since he was 10 years old.

=== Gary Ball rescue ===
In 1992 on K2, Mazur and his team worked together to rescue Gary Ball from 8300 meters after Ball was struck down by a pulmonary embolism. Rob Hall, Scott Fischer, Ed Viesturs, Neal Beidleman and Jon Pratt also assisted in the high altitude rescue. The operation took several days, descending technical ground.

=== Lincoln Hall rescue ===
At 7:30 am on May 26, 2006, Mazur and his fellow ascending climbers, Andrew Brash (Canada), Myles Osborne (UK) and Jangbu Sherpa (Nepal), were eight hours into their planned ascent to the summit up the North Ridge of Mount Everest. They were climbing along a severe ridgeline that dropped off 10,000 feet to one side and 7,000 feet to the other. Two hours below the summit, conditions seemed perfect. There was no wind and no clouds, and they were feeling strong and healthy.

At an altitude of approximately 28,000 feet, when rounding a corner on the trail to the summit, the team encountered Lincoln Hall. Hall, an Australian climber, had been 'left for dead' by his own expedition team on the descent from the summit the previous day. After collapsing, failing to respond to prolonged treatment and being unable to walk, he was now sitting alone on the trail. He was found with his jacket around his waist, no hat and no gloves, and without any of the proper equipment for survival in such conditions. The group determined that he was suffering from symptoms of cerebral oedema, frostbite and dehydration as he was hallucinating, mumbling deliriously and appeared generally incoherent in his responses to offers of help.

The rescuers replaced the hat, jacket, and gloves Mr. Hall had discarded, anchored him to the mountain, and gave him their own oxygen, food and water. They radioed Hall's team, who had given him up for dead, and convinced them he was still alive and must be saved. Mr. Hall's team leader had already called his wife the night before to tell her that Hall was dead. The rescuers arranged for Sherpas from Mr. Hall's team to ascend and help with the rescue. For four hours, Mazur's team stayed to care for Mr. Hall. Phil Crampton coordinated the rescue from the high camp at 26,000 feet, and Kipa Sherpa was the liaison to Lincoln Hall's team at advance base camp at 21,000 feet.

Extended stays at extreme altitude are risky even when planned in advance and when climbers have all the supplies they need. By using their own survival supplies to sustain Hall, going to the summit after so many hours spent helping Hall was out of the question. Staying there to care for Hall, they took a risk the weather would turn for the worse and they might not even have sufficient oxygen and food to support themselves on the way down. In abandoning their own attempt on the summit in order to save Hall's life, epitomized the noblest traditions of mountaineering. Mazur said of his team abandoning their summit attempt, "The summit is still there, and we can go back. Lincoln only has one life."

Several print as well as television documentaries tell the story in detail. Their actions were underscored by the death of British climber David Sharp a few days earlier, a solo climber who had been terribly sick and other mountaineers who passed by him on their way to the summit.

=== Rick Allen rescue ===
During the 2018 Broad Peak Expedition, Mazur and his team rescued Rick Allen, a British climber who disappeared at night near the summit and whose teammates reported him dead and descended with Rick's satellite phone. Mazur and team found Rick Allen alive and brought him down to base camp three days later.

== Community and environmental engagement ==
Each year Mazur leads and organizes groups of volunteers to visit, bring supplies, medicines, health care and education to the Himalayas.

Mazur founded the Mount Everest Biogas Project with Garry Porter in 2010 to address the growing waste management problem on Everest. The project aims to reduce the environmental impact of human waste in the Everest region by developing and installing solar-powered biogas digesters suitable for the high-altitude conditions. Mazur is President of the Deboche Project, a charitable organisation that focuses on the rebuilding of the Deboche Convent in Sagarmatha National Park after the 2015 earthquake.

== Awards and honours ==
- National Geographic Adventurer of the Year, 2006
- Sir Edmund Hillary Mountain Legacy Medal, 2018

== See also ==
- List of Mount Everest guides
- List of Mount Everest summiters by number of times to the summit

== Sources ==
- Olympia news article re 2006 rescue
- Summit Climb Biop
