= Merritt Turetsky =

Ecologist & carbon cycle scientist

- Education: Villanova University; University of Alberta
- Scientific career
- Workplaces: University of Colorado Boulder; Michigan State University; University of Alaska Fairbanks; University of Guelph
- Thesis: Carbon storage and decay in peatlands under varying permafrost regimes. (2002)
- Website: Ecosystem Analysis Lab

Merritt Turetsky is an American ecosystem ecologist and a professor at the University of Colorado Boulder. She currently serves as the Director of Arctic Security for the University of Colorado. She served as the first woman Director of the Institute for Arctic and Alpine Research (INSTAAR) from 2019-2023. Her research considers fire regimes, climate change and biogeochemical cycling in Arctic wetlands. Turetsky is a member of the Permafrost Action Team (SEARCH), a group of scientists who translate and deliver science to decision-makers.

== Early life and education ==
Turetsky was born in the Northeastern United States. She was an undergraduate at Villanova University in Pennsylvania. She moved to the University of Alberta as a graduate student, where she researched carbon storage and fluxes in peatlands under differing permafrost. After graduating, Turetsky worked as a visiting scientist with the Canadian Forest Service. She studied the nutrient cycling done by bryophytes. She was appointed a Mendenhall Postdoctoral fellow with the U.S. Geological Survey. After a couple of years, she was appointed to the faculty at the Michigan State University.

== Career ==
In 2005, Turetsky joined the Bonanza Creek Long Term Ecological Research site, a network of scientists that looks to connect and collaborate on arctic research. In 2007, she joined the Institute of Arctic Biology at the University of Alaska Fairbanks and moved to the University of Guelph in 2008. in 2011, she was appointed a Canada Research Chair in Integrative Ecology.

In 2019, Turetsky became the first woman director of Institute of Arctic and Alpine Research (INSTAAR) and Professor in Ecology and Environmental Biology at the University of Colorado Boulder.

== Research ==
Her work revolves around fire regimes in Northern wetlands and their relationship with climate change.

In 2006, Turetsky showed that Northern fires have been occurring more frequently and that the fire season has become longer compared to the past. Changes to Northern fire regimes impact the composition of Northern forests, making Boreal forests younger, which affects nutrient cycling. She has monitored the biological and biogeochemical cycles in Northern wetlands. She identified that bryophytes impact soil factors such as moisture, temperature, and density and that bryophytes limit the nitrogen availability in soil.

Her work showed that thawing permafrost contributes to greenhouse gas emissions, and continues to do so over time, accelerating climate change estimates based purely upon anthropogenic emissions. She has investigated the positive feedback loop between warming climates, which thaw permafrost, and the subsequent release of greenhouse gases.

As of 2016, Turetsky was part of the NASA Arctic-Boreal Vulnerability Experiment (ABoVE) program. The ABoVE program studies the changes in the Arctic and Borealri regions and tries to determine the resulting socio-ecological consequences. She is a founding member of the Permafrost Carbon Network (PCN), a group of permafrost scientists who share findings inform policy on permafrost.

Turetsky contributed to the 2021 State of the Cryosphere report, which looked to understand the snow and ice regions on planet Earth. The report, which was written by over fifty scientists (half of whom contribute to the Intergovernmental Panel on Climate Change), called for the United Nations Climate Change conference to protect the cryosphere.

== Academic service ==
In 2018, Turetsky started to write and present a segment on science for the CTV “Your Morning” show. That year she was made an American Association for the Advancement of Science Leshner Institute Science Engagement Fellow. She worked alongside the Royal Society of Canada to talk to the residents of the Arctic region of Canada about the climate challenges facing their region.

=== Awards ===
- 2004 Mendenhall Postdoctoral Fellowship
- 2015 Ministry of Research and Innovation and Science Ontario Early Researcher Award
- 2018 American Association for the Advancement of Science Leshner Institute Science Engagement Fellow
- 2019 NAS Polar Research Board

== Selected publications ==
- Eric S. Kasischke; Merritt R. Turetsky (3 May 2006). "Recent changes in the fire regime across the North American boreal region—Spatial and temporal patterns of burning across Canada and Alaska". Geophysical Research Letters. 33 (9). Bibcode:2006GeoRL..33.9703K. doi:10.1029/2006gl025677. ISSN 0094-8276. Wikidata Q72994332.
- E A G Schuur; A D McGuire; C Schädel; et al. (1 April 2015). "Climate change and the permafrost carbon feedback". Nature. 520 (7546): 171–179. Bibcode:2015Natur.520..171S. doi:10.1038/nature14338. ISSN 1476-4687. PMID 25855454. Wikidata Q35597913.
- Merritt R. Turetsky; Evan S. Kane; Jennifer W. Harden; Roger D. Ottmar; Kristen L. Manies; Elizabeth Hoy; Eric S. Kasischke (5 December 2010). "Recent acceleration of biomass burning and carbon losses in Alaskan forests and peatlands". Nature Geoscience. 4 (1): 27–31. Bibcode:2011NatGe...4...27T. doi:10.1038/ngeo1027. ISSN 1752-0894. Wikidata Q59853457.
