= Hans Kinzl =

Austrian geographer

Hans Kinzl (1899–1979) was an Austrian geographer and mountain researcher.

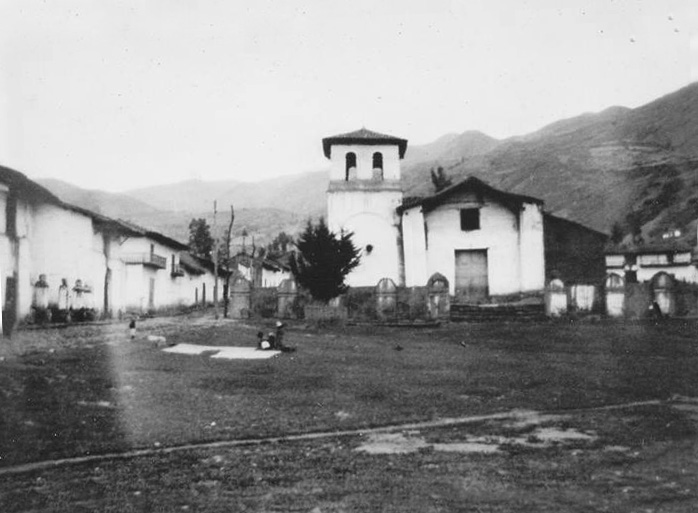
The plaza of Chacas. Photo taken by Hans Kinzl during his stay in Ancash, Peru in 1928.

== Life ==
Hans Kinzl was born in Upper Austria in 1899. After his studies of geography at the University of Innsbruck he became assistant of his mentor Johann Sölch—disciple of Albrecht Penck—in Innsbruck. He then followed Sölch—who succeeded Alfred Hettner in Heidelberg—but returned to the University of Innsbruck where he became a professor of geography.

== Research ==
Apart from the European Alps, his focus was on the Peruvian Andes where he conducted glaciological, geomorphological, agricultural and population research.Cordillera Blanca Hans Kinzl is best known for his 1930's maps of the Cordillera Blanca mountain range located in Peru. He later became the head of the Geographical Department of the University of Innsbruck.
