= Eco.mont =

Scientific journal

eco.mont
- Discipline: Mountain research
- Language: English
- Edited by: Axel Borsdorf, Günter Köck

Publication details
- History: 2009–present
- Publisher: Austrian Academy of Sciences and Innsbruck University Press (Austria)
- Frequency: Biannual
- Impact factor: 0.333 (2016)

Standard abbreviations
- ISO 4: eco.mont

Indexing
- ISSN: 2073-106X (print); 2073-1558 (web)
- OCLC no.: 786451449

Links
- Journal homepage; Online archive

eco.mont – Journal on Protected Mountain Areas Research and Management is a peer-reviewed open access scientific journal on mountain research in protected areas.

== Overview ==
The journal was established by the Alpine Network of Protected Areas, the International Scientific Committee on Research in the Alps, the Austrian Academy of Sciences, and the University of Innsbruck. The founding editors are Axel Borsdorf and Günter Köck. The journal covers research on protected areas in the Alps and in other mountain regions. From 2015 the journal is published as open access and from 2017 it is listed in the Directory of Open Access Journals.

== Abstracting and indexing ==
The journal is abstracted and indexed in the Science Citation Index Expanded, Current Contents/Agriculture, Biology & Environmental Sciences, Scopus, and ERIH PLUS.
