= Institute of Arctic and Alpine Research =

Scientific research institute

The Institute of Arctic and Alpine Research (INSTAAR) is a scientific institute that is part of the University of Colorado Boulder. Its research mission is to "[develop] scientific knowledge of physical and biogeochemical environmental processes at local, regional and global scales, and appl[y] this knowledge to improve society's awareness and understanding of natural and anthropogenic environmental change."

INSTAAR is affiliated with multiple departments and programs at CU-Boulder, including Anthropology, Atmospheric and Oceanic Sciences, Certificate in Oceanography, Civil, Environmental and Architectural Engineering, Ecology and Evolutionary Biology, Geography, Geological Sciences, and Hydrologic Sciences. Most INSTAAR scientists and all graduate students performing research at INSTAAR are also rostered in a CU department or program.

== Activities ==
INSTAAR's traditional research focus has been on polar and alpine regions, where effects of global change are especially pronounced. In recent decades, research has broadened to include environmental challenges that span local, regional, and global scales and environments around the globe. Topics include Quaternary and modern environments, human and ecosystem ecology, biogeochemistry, landscape evolution, hydrology, oceanography, and climate. Field sites are located across all seven continents and the world's oceans.

Several research programs are conducted through INSTAAR, including the Niwot Ridge and McMurdo Dry Valleys sites of the Long Term Ecological Research Network and the Boulder Creek site of the Critical Zone Observatory. INSTAAR operates the Mountain Research Station, a field research facility near Niwot, Colorado.

The institute publishes Arctic, Antarctic, and Alpine Research, a peer-reviewed journal. It hosts the International Arctic Workshop in alternate years.

== History ==
Inaugurated in 1951, INSTAAR is the oldest research institute at the University of Colorado. Its origins extend back further, to CU's mountain camps and labs of the early 20th century. In 2019 Merritt Turetsky was the first woman to be appointed Director of INSTAAR.
