= Lincoln Hall (climber) =

Australian mountaineer (1955–2012)

Personal information
- Born: 19 December 1955 Canberra, Australian Capital Territory, Australia
- Died: 20 March 2012 (aged 56) Camperdown, Sydney, Australia
- Occupations: adventurer, author and philanthropist.
- Spouse: Barbara Hall

Climbing career
- Type of climber: Mountaineer
- First ascents: Mount Minto (Antarctica) (1988), many first Australian ascents of major peaks.
- Major ascents: Mount Everest (2006), Makalu (1999), Annapurna II (1983), Dunagiri (1978)
- Named routes: Hall Route, Carstensz Pyramid (1993)
- Known for: Surviving Mount Everest in death zone for one day without any oxygen or warmth
Medal record
Order of Australia

Lincoln Ross Hall OAM (19 December 1955 – 20 March 2012) was a veteran Australian mountaineer, adventurer and author. Lincoln was part of the first Australian expedition to climb Mount Everest in 1984, which successfully forged a new route. He reached the summit of Mount Everest on his second attempt in 2006, miraculously surviving the night at 8,700 m (28,543 ft) on descent, after his family had been told he had died.

Lincoln Hall was the author of seven books, a founding member of the philanthropic organisation the Australian Himalayan Foundation and a speaker who shared his climbing experiences with audiences around the world.

In 1987 Lincoln Hall was awarded a Medal of the Order of Australia for service to mountaineering and in 2010 he won the Australian Geographic Society's Lifetime of Adventure award. He was a life member of the Australian National University Mountaineering Club. Lincoln Ross Hall died of mesothelioma aged 56 on 20 March 2012.

== Early life ==
Hall was born in Canberra, Australia and went to Telopea Park High School. He studied Zoology at the Australian National University and learned to climb at climbing crags in the Australian Capital Territory, most notably Booroomba Rocks (where he pioneered a number of classic routes). He developed his ice climbing skills in the Snowy Mountains at Blue Lake and trained to climb by traversing the walls of buildings at his university campus.

== Career ==
Hall had his real start with mountaineering when he participated in the Australian National University Mountaineering Club expeditions to New Zealand from 1975 to 1978. This culminated in the ANUMC 1978 expedition to the Himalayan peak Dunagiri (7,066 m [23,182 ft]) in India. Hall and his climbing partner Tim Macartney-Snape (Australia) were invited by expedition leader Peter Cocker to join him at Col Camp so the pair could force through a route through to the summit ridge. They did so then made an audacious push for the summit after spending a night out on the mountain. Hall was pivotal in the successful summit bid by Macartney-Snape.

The pair descended through an electrical storm, however Hall spent another night out on the mountain. Cocker ascended during the night and met him at the top of the fixed ropes and accompanied him back to Col Camp. The ANUMC team then raced Hall down to Base Camp where he was helicoptered to a Military Hospital near Delhi. This was at the time possibly the highest helicopter rescue in the Himalayas.

The successful Dunagiri trip by the ANUMC forged the Hall and Macartney-Snape partnership, setting the stage for their Himalayan mountaineering careers including their 1984 Mount Everest expedition.

After Dunagiri, Hall participated in and led numerous climbing adventures around the world, including many first ascents by Australian climbers. Amongst these were two expeditions to climb Mount Everest in Nepal (including the first Australian ascent in 1984); the first ascent of Mount Minto in the Admiralty Mountains of Antarctica (1998); and ascents of other notable peaks including Annapurna II (7963m) in Nepal, Makalu (8481m) on the China-Nepal border, and Carstensz Pyramid in Irian Jaya, Indonesia.

== Rescue on Everest ==
Lincoln Hall narrowly survived after his ascent of Mount Everest in 2006. He was left for dead at an altitude of 8700 m while descending from the summit on 25 May 2006. He had fallen ill from a form of altitude sickness, probably cerebral edema, that caused him to hallucinate and become confused. According to reports, Hall's Sherpa guides attempted to rescue him for hours. However, as night began to fall their oxygen supplies diminished and snow blindness set in. Expedition leader Alexander Abramov eventually ordered the guides to leave the apparently dead Hall on the mountain and return to camp. A statement was later released announcing his death to his friends and family.

However, the next morning, 12 hours later, Hall was found still alive by a team making a summit attempt. The team consisted of team leader Daniel Mazur (U.S.), Andrew Brash (Canada), Myles Osborne (UK), and Jangbu Sherpa (Nepal). Osborne described the scene just below the Second Step:

"Sitting to our left, about two feet from a 10,000 foot drop, was a man. Not dead, not sleeping, but sitting cross legged, in the process of changing his shirt. He had his down suit unzipped to the waist, his arms out of the sleeves, was wearing no hat, no gloves, no sunglasses, had no oxygen mask, regulator, ice axe, oxygen, no sleeping bag, no mattress, no food nor water bottle. 'I imagine you're surprised to see me here', he said. Now, this was a moment of total disbelief to us all. Here was a gentleman, apparently lucid, who had spent the night without oxygen at 8600m, without proper equipment and barely clothed. And ALIVE???"

A rescue effort that mountain observers described as "unprecedented in scale" then swung into action. Mazur and his team abandoned their summit attempt to stay with Hall, who was badly frostbitten and delusional from the effects of severe cerebral edema. At the same time, Abramov dispatched a rescue team of 12 Sherpa guides from the base camp. The rescue team comprised Ongshu Sherpa, Nima Wangde Sherpa, Passang Sherpa, Furba Rushakj Sherpa, Dawa Tenzing Sherpa, Dorjee Sherpa, Mingma Sherpa, Mingma Dorjee Sherpa, Pemba Sherpa, Pemba Nuru Sherpa, Passang Gaylgen Sherpa, and Lakcha Sherpa.

Hall was brought down the mountain, walking the last part of the way to Everest's North Col where he was treated by a Russian doctor Andrey Selivanov. He arrived at Advanced Base Camp the next day in reasonably good health although suffering from frostbite and the lingering effects of cerebral edema. He lost the tips of his fingers and a toe to frostbite.

Hall's survival and rescue came shortly after the death of UK climber David Sharp on the mountain. Initially, no attempt was made to rescue Sharp. While he was unconscious but still alive, other climbers passed him and continued on their own ascents. However, unlike David Sharp, Hall was conscious and able to walk, two factors that allowed for his rescue. The case had raised concerns, including comments from Sir Edmund Hillary. Dan Mazur said of his team abandoning their summit attempt, "The summit is still there and we can go back. Lincoln only has one life."

== After Everest ==
Hall remained close with Myles Osborne, who sacrificed his only attempt on Everest to aid him. Osborne says Hall was "a great guy, really laid back, with a penchant for bad jokes."

Dateline NBC aired Left for Dead on Mount Everest, an Emmy Award-nominated documentary special, in 2006.

Hall wrote two books about his experience: Dead Lucky: Life after death on Mount Everest (2007) and Alive In The Death Zone: Mount Everest Survival (2008).

A second documentary, Miracle on Everest, based on Hall's book Dead Lucky, premiered in 2008 on National Geographic Channel in the USA and on ABC1 in Australia.

Hall's story was later featured in the I Shouldn't Be Alive episode, "Left for Dead on Everest" (16 February 2011).

== Death ==
Hall died on 20 March 2012 at the Royal Prince Alfred Hospital in Sydney, after suffering from mesothelioma.

Friend and fellow mountaineer Greg Mortimer, who was with Lincoln at the end, said: "It was very peaceful in the end, around 11:45 last night. Lincoln got into quiet, rhythmic breathing—it was almost meditative—and then he quietly slipped away". Hall lived in the Blue Mountains in New South Wales with his wife and two sons, who survived him.

== Bibliography ==
- White Limbo: The First Australian Climb of Mt Everest (1985) Kevin Weldon, Sydney.
- The Loneliest Mountain: The Dramatic Story of the First Expedition to Climb Mt Minto, Antarctica (1989) Simon & Schuster, Sydney.
- Blood on the Lotus (fiction) (1990) Simon & Schuster, Sydney.
- First Ascent: The Life and Climbs of Greg Mortimer (1996) Simon & Schuster, Sydney.
- Douglas Mawson: The Life of an Explorer (2000) New Holland, Sydney.
- Fear No Boundary: The Road to Everest and Beyond (with Sue Fear) (2005) Lothian Books, Melbourne.
- Dead Lucky: Life after death on Mount Everest (2007) Random House, Sydney.
- Alive In The Death Zone: Mount Everest Survival (2008) Random House, Australia.

== See also ==
- Beck Weathers, American climber who was left for dead on Mount Everest in 1996.
