= Arctic, Antarctic, and Alpine Research =

- Discipline: Environmental science
- Language: English
- Edited by: Anne E. Jennings, Diane McKnight

Publication details
- Former names: Arctic and Alpine Research
- History: 1969–present
- Publisher: Institute of Arctic and Alpine Research (United States)
- Frequency: Quarterly
- Impact factor: 2.231 (2017)

Standard abbreviations
- ISO 4: Arct. Antarct. Alp. Res.

Indexing
- CODEN: AAARFO
- ISSN: 1523-0430 (print); 1938-4246 (web)
- LCCN: sn98001437
- JSTOR: 15230430
- OCLC no.: 40558886

Links
- Journal homepage; Online archive to 2017; Online archive to 2017

Arctic, Antarctic, and Alpine Research is a peer-reviewed scientific journal published by the Institute of Arctic and Alpine Research (University of Colorado Boulder). It covers research on all aspects of Arctic, Antarctic, and alpine environments, including subarctic, subantarctic, subalpine, and paleoenvironments. Jack D. Ives founded the journal in 1969 as Arctic and Alpine Research and the name was expanded to include the Antarctic in 1999. The co-editors are Anne E. Jennings and Diane McKnight (University of Colorado Boulder).

== Abstracting and indexing ==
The journal is abstracted and indexed in the Science Citation Index, Current Contents/Agriculture, Biology & Environmental Sciences, The Zoological Record, and BIOSIS Previews. According to the Journal Citation Reports, the journal has a 2017 impact factor of 2.231.
