= Niwot Ridge =

Coordinates: 40.0000°N 105.3000°W

Niwot Ridge is an alpine ecology research station located 40 miles (65 km) northwest of Denver in north-central Colorado. It is on the Front Range of the southern Rocky Mountains and lies within the Roosevelt National Forest. Niwot Ridge is 2,900 meters (9,500 ft) high.

== Characteristics of the site ==
Niwot Ridge was designated a UNESCO Biosphere Reserve in 1979 and was one of 17 reserves in the United States withdrew from the program in June 2017. The Niwot Ridge Long-Term Ecological Research Site was established in 1980 as a United States Forest Service experimental ecology reserve.

The site is characterized by "extensive alpine tundra, a variety of glacial landforms, glacial lakes and moraines, cirques and talus slopes, patterned ground, and permafrost", and is home to Arikaree Glacier. Habitats include western spruce-fir forest, lodgepole pine (Pinus contorta) subalpine forest, alpine meadows as well as ponderosa pine (Pinus ponderosa) shrubland. The site is little influenced by human impact and is thus an excellent site to monitor biological, chemical, and physical responses to changes in atmospheric chemistry and climate. The site is administered cooperatively by the U.S. Forest Service and the University of Colorado Boulder's Institute of Arctic and Alpine Research (INSTAAR) for experimental and long-term studies of alpine tundra.

The University of Colorado's Mountain Research Station facilitates research from atmospheric chemistry to alpine and sub-alpine ecology. Niwot Ridge is one of the National Science Foundation's Long Term Ecological Research Network (LTER) sites and has been used by the National Oceanic and Atmospheric Administration (NOAA) for atmospheric trace gas sampling since 1968. The eddy covariance dataset at Niwot Ridge is among the longest for forest sites, and has been used to study the role of subalpine forests in cycles of water, carbon, nutrients, and energy.

Substantial increases in nitrogen deposition during the past three decades are one of the major concerns and have already impacted biological processes in the alpine tundra and surrounding catchment areas. Educational programs in the biosphere reserve focus primarily on the university level but also include high schools and the general public.

== Climate ==
The weather station, Boulder 14 W, is located roughly 300 feet (91 m) above Niwot Ridge. Niwot Ridge has a subalpine climate (Köppen Dfc).

Climate data for Boulder 14 W, Colorado, 1991–2020 normals: 9828ft (2996m)
| Month | Jan | Feb | Mar | Apr | May | Jun | Jul | Aug | Sep | Oct | Nov | Dec | Year |
|---|---|---|---|---|---|---|---|---|---|---|---|---|---|
| Record high °F (°C) | 54 (12) | 50 (10) | 60 (16) | 62 (17) | 71 (22) | 79 (26) | 80 (27) | 78 (26) | 78 (26) | 67 (19) | 59 (15) | 52 (11) | 80 (27) |
| Mean maximum °F (°C) | 45.1 (7.3) | 43.8 (6.6) | 51.8 (11.0) | 57.2 (14.0) | 65.5 (18.6) | 74.0 (23.3) | 75.9 (24.4) | 73.6 (23.1) | 69.8 (21.0) | 62.4 (16.9) | 52.6 (11.4) | 44.7 (7.1) | 76.4 (24.7) |
| Mean daily maximum °F (°C) | 28.6 (−1.9) | 27.8 (−2.3) | 35.6 (2.0) | 40.3 (4.6) | 50.1 (10.1) | 61.8 (16.6) | 67.9 (19.9) | 65.8 (18.8) | 58.5 (14.7) | 46.8 (8.2) | 35.3 (1.8) | 28.0 (−2.2) | 45.5 (7.5) |
| Daily mean °F (°C) | 20.2 (−6.6) | 19.6 (−6.9) | 26.1 (−3.3) | 30.9 (−0.6) | 39.4 (4.1) | 48.9 (9.4) | 55.2 (12.9) | 53.3 (11.8) | 46.0 (7.8) | 36.4 (2.4) | 27.2 (−2.7) | 19.7 (−6.8) | 35.2 (1.8) |
| Mean daily minimum °F (°C) | 11.8 (−11.2) | 11.5 (−11.4) | 16.7 (−8.5) | 21.5 (−5.8) | 28.6 (−1.9) | 35.9 (2.2) | 42.5 (5.8) | 40.8 (4.9) | 33.6 (0.9) | 26.0 (−3.3) | 19.1 (−7.2) | 11.5 (−11.4) | 25.0 (−3.9) |
| Mean minimum °F (°C) | −10.4 (−23.6) | −10.8 (−23.8) | −2.4 (−19.1) | 4.2 (−15.4) | 13.8 (−10.1) | 28.8 (−1.8) | 34.5 (1.4) | 31.9 (−0.1) | 24.3 (−4.3) | 8.4 (−13.1) | −2.6 (−19.2) | −11.6 (−24.2) | −17.3 (−27.4) |
| Record low °F (°C) | −22 (−30) | −37 (−38) | −10 (−23) | −7 (−22) | −1 (−18) | 24 (−4) | 29 (−2) | 27 (−3) | 17 (−8) | −15 (−26) | −18 (−28) | −24 (−31) | −37 (−38) |
| Average precipitation inches (mm) | 2.67 (68) | 2.77 (70) | 3.68 (93) | 4.83 (123) | 3.82 (97) | 1.95 (50) | 3.04 (77) | 2.51 (64) | 2.01 (51) | 2.17 (55) | 2.26 (57) | 2.15 (55) | 33.86 (860) |
Source 1: NOAA
Source 2: XMACIS (records & monthly max/mins)

== Sources ==
This article incorporates text from a free content work (license statement/permission). Text taken from UNESCO - MAB Biosphere Reserves Directory, UNESCO, UNESCO.
