= Bruno Messerli =

Swiss geographer and university professor (1931-2019)

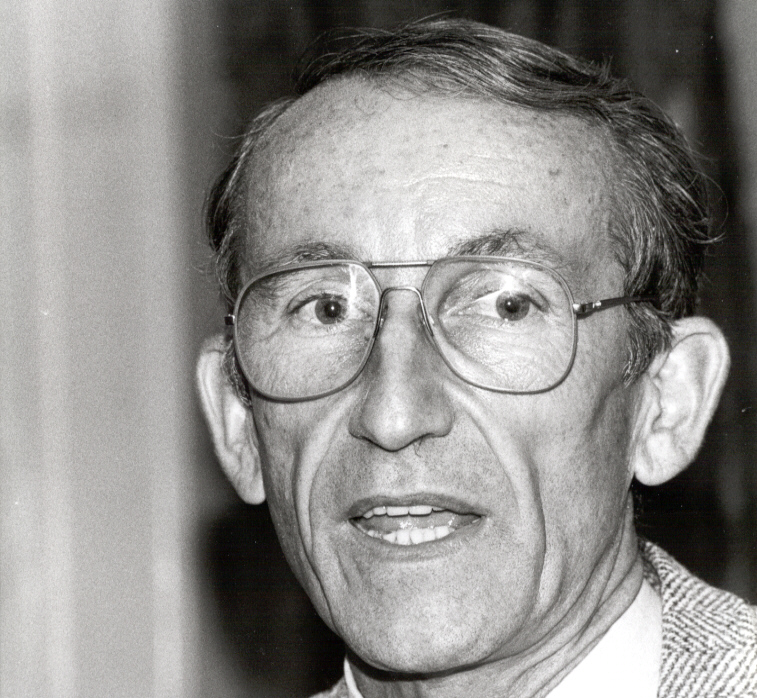
- Messerli in 1986
- Born: 17 September 1931; Belp, Canton of Bern, Switzerland
- Died: 4 February 2019 (aged 87)
- Spouse: Beatrice
- Awards: Gold medal of King Albert I Memorial Foundation, 2002; Founder's Medal, Royal Geographical Society, 2002; Marcel Benoist Prize, 1990; Global 500 Roll of Honour of the United Nations Environment Programme (UNEP), 1988

Academic background
- Education: Ph.D.
- Influences: Carl Troll

Academic work
- Discipline: Geography
- Notable works: Himalayan Dilemma: Reconciling development and conservation; Mountains of the World: A Global Priority
- Notable ideas: Debunking of so-called Theory of Himalayan Environmental Degradation; Himalayan Uncertainty, from macro to micro levels; global prioritization of montological issues

Bruno Messerli (17 September 1931, in Belp – 4 February 2019) was a Swiss geographer and university professor who focused on high mountains and highland-lowland linkages. He was appointed Full Professor of Geomorphology in 1968 by the University of Bern, where he taught and carried out research until his retirement in 1996. He contributed significantly to the inclusion of a mountain agenda, Chapter 13 — Managing Fragile Ecosystems — Sustainable Mountain Development in Agenda 21, the official action plan of the United Nations Conference on Environment and Development (UNCED), also known as the Rio de Janeiro Earth Summit, the Rio Summit, the Rio Conference, and the Earth Summit, held in Rio de Janeiro from 3 to 14 June in 1992.

== Education ==
Bruno Messerli completed his doctorate at the University of Bern in 1962. His doctoral research concerned the geomorphology of the Sierra Nevada in Andalusia, Spain. His post-doctoral Habilitation thesis concerned Quaternary glaciation of mountain ranges around the Mediterranean basin.

== Career ==
Dr. Messerli became a full professor of geography at the University of Bern in 1968. From 1978 to 1983, he served as Director of the Institute of Geography, and as Rector of the university from 1986 to 1987. In 1996, he became Professor Emeritus. Messerli was President of the International Geographical Union (IGU) from 1996 to 2000. From 1996 to 2001, he served as Co-Director of the International Geosphere-Biosphere Programme’s project on Past Global Changes (PAGES), founded by Messerli's friend and colleague at the University of Bern, Hans Oeschger.

Messerli worked on the United Nations University's Himalayan Highland-Lowland Interactive Project together with Professor Jack D. Ives. He was a principal founder of International Centre for Integrated Mountain Development (ICIMOD), an intergovernmental agency located in Kathmandu, Nepal, and dedicated to interdisciplinary research on mountain systems. With Jack Ives, also, Messerli was one of the handful of montologists advocating for the Mountain Agenda in the 1992 Rio Declaration on Environment and Development (Chapter 13 in Agenda 21: Managing Fragile Ecosystems: Sustainable Mountain Development). He was a founder of the International Centre for Integrated Mountain Development (ICIMOD) in Nepal and of the Mountain Research Initiative (MRI), based in Switzerland. He had a long collaboration with the UN's Food and Agriculture Organization (FAO), which supervises the Mountain Agenda.

== Awards ==
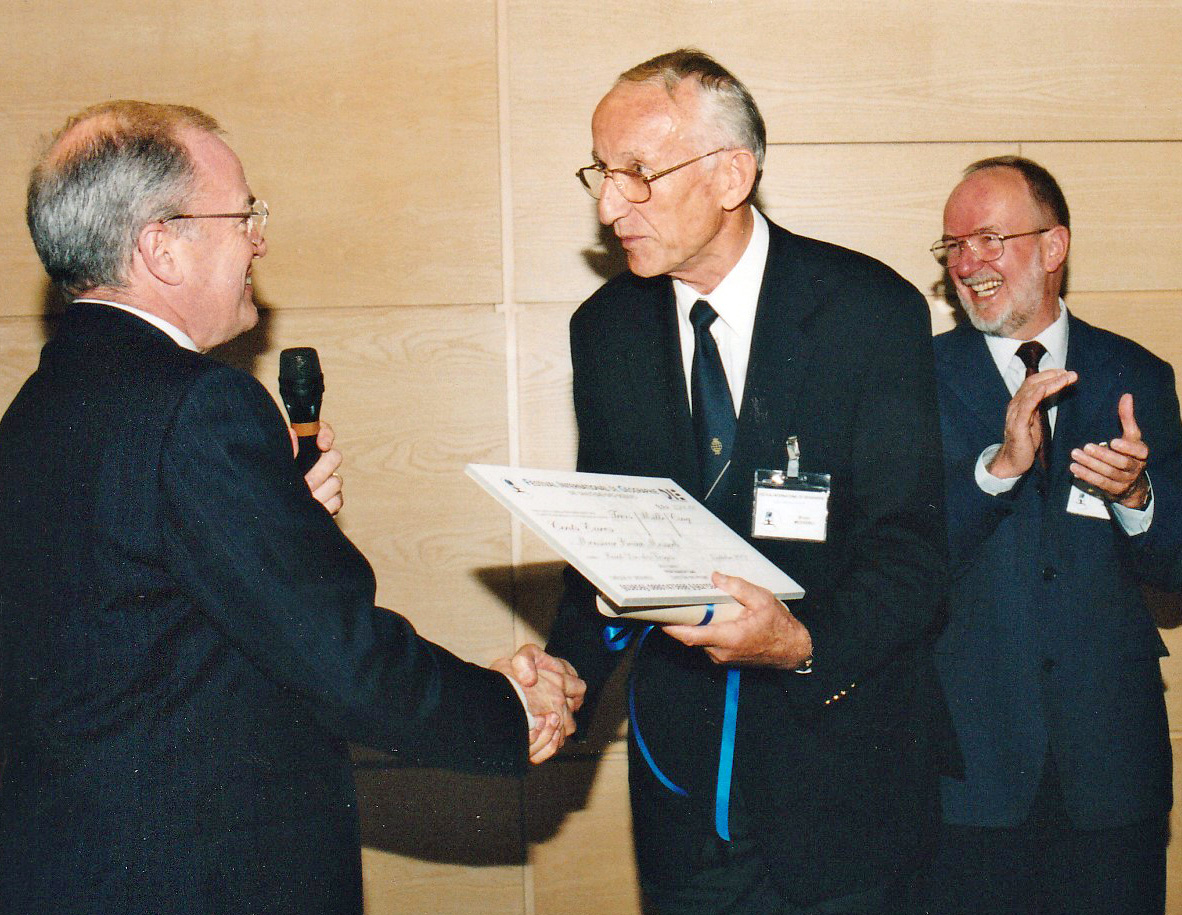
Vautrin Lud Prize in 2002.

- 1988: Global 500 Roll of Honour of the United Nations Environment Programme (UNEP)
- 1990: Marcel Benoist Prize
- 2002: Vautrin Lud Prize
- 2002: King Albert I Gold Medal
- 2002: Founder's Medal of the Royal Geographical Society
- 2002: FAO - Medal for the UN - International Year of Mountains, Global Mountain Summit in Bishkek, Kyrgyzstan

== Works ==
- with H. Oeschger and M. Svilar (ed.): Das Klima—Analysen und Modelle Geschichte und Zukunft. [Climate: Analysis and Models, History and Future] Berlin, Heidelberg, New York, 1980. Springer-Verlag.
- with JD Ives(ed.): Mountain Ecosystems, Stability and Instability . Spec. Publ. IGU Congress Paris - Alps 1984. Mountain Research and Development
- with E. Brugger, G. Furrer and P. Messerli (ed.): Upheaval in the mountain area. The development of the Swiss mountain area between independence and dependence from an economic and ecological point of view. Main publishing house, Berne 1984.
- with JD Ives: The Himalayan Dilemma: Reconciling Development and Conservation, London and NY: Routledge, 1989, ISBN 0-415-01157-4
- with JD Ives Mountains of the World: A Global Priority, London and NY: Parthenon, 1997, ISBN 1-85070-781-2
- with T. Hofer: Floods in Bangladesh. History, Dynamics and Rethinking the Role of the Himalayas. United Nations University Press, Tokyo / New York 2006.
