= Austrian Academy of Sciences =

Science academy in Austria

- Österreichische Akademie der Wissenschaften

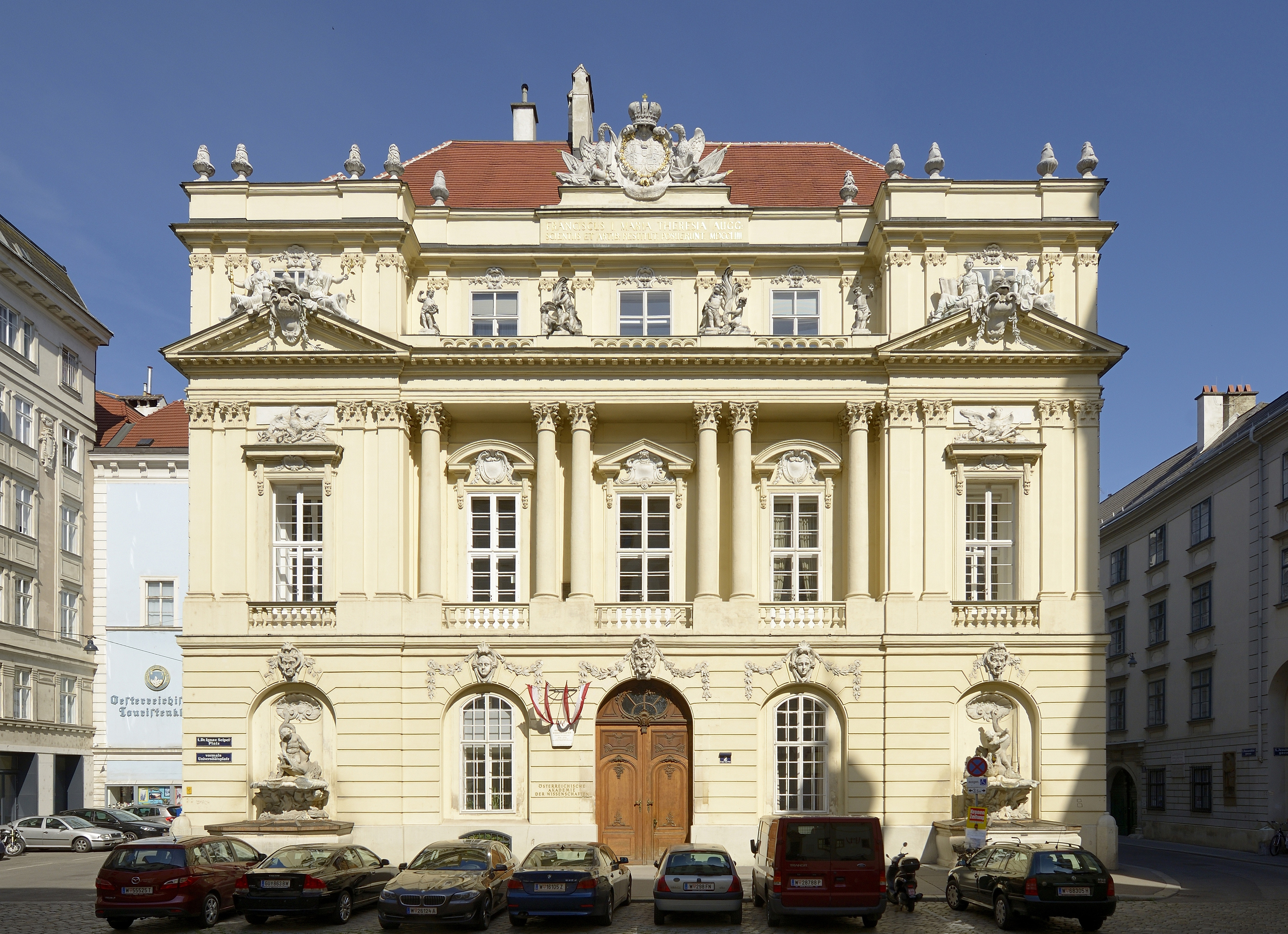
- Austrian Academy of Sciences

Agency overview
- Formed: 1847; 179 years ago
- Type: National academy
- Jurisdiction: Austria
- Headquarters: Vienna, Austria; 48°12′32″N 16°22′37″E
- Agency executives: Heinz Faßmann, President; Ulrike Diebold, Vice President
- Website: www.oeaw.ac.at

The Austrian Academy of Sciences (German: Österreichische Akademie der Wissenschaften; ÖAW) is a legal entity under the special protection of the Republic of Austria. According to the statutes of the Academy its mission is to promote the sciences and humanities in every respect and in every field, particularly in fundamental research.

== History ==
In 1713, Gottfried Wilhelm Leibniz suggested to establish an Academy, inspired by the Royal Society and the French Academy of Sciences. The "Kaiserliche Akademie der Wissenschaften in Wien" was finally established by Imperial Patent on 14 May 1847. The academy soon began extensive research. In the humanities the academy started with researching and publishing important historical sources of Austria. Research in natural science also covered a wide variety of topics.

The 1921 federal law guaranteed the legal basis of the academy in the newly founded First Austrian Republic. From the mid-1960s onwards it became the country's leading institution in the field of non-university basic research.

The academy is also a learned society, and its past members have included Theodor Billroth, Ludwig Boltzmann, Christian Doppler, Anton Eiselsberg, Otto Hittmair, Paul Kretschmer, Hans Horst Meyer, Albert Anton von Muchar, Julius von Schlosser, Roland Scholl, Eduard Suess and the Nobel Prize winners Julius Wagner-Jauregg, Victor Francis Hess, Erwin Schrödinger and Konrad Lorenz. Anton Zeilinger, predecessor of the academy's incumbent president, is Nobel Prize laureate in physics 2022.

== Research facilities ==
The academy operates 25 research institutes. In 2012, a reorganization prompted the outsourcing of various institutes to universities as well as mergers. The academy's institutes are split into two major divisions, one for mathematics and natural sciences (mathematisch-naturwissenschaftliche Klasse) and one for humanities and social sciences (philosophisch-historische Klasse).

In the field of humanities, there are the Institute for the Study of Ancient Culture, which is well known for the analysis of excavation results in Carnuntum and Ephesos, the Institute for Interdisciplinary Mountain Research, focusing on montology, the Institute of Culture Studies and Theatre History, and the Vienna Institute of Demography, among others.

The academy conducts socio-cultural research in Tibetan-speaking Himalayas, Tibet, and central Asia.

Facilities that focus on natural sciences include the Institute of Molecular Biotechnology (which is operated in cooperation with Boehringer Ingelheim), the Gregor Mendel Institute, the Aithyra Institute for biomedical Artificial Intelligence, the Johann Radon Institute for Computational and Applied Mathematics (RICAM), Linz, the Research Center for Molecular Medicine, the Erich Schmid Institute of Materials Science, the Institute for Quantum Optics and Quantum Information, the Acoustics Research Institute, the Space Research Institute and the Institute for High Energy Physics (HEPHY), Wien.

== Gallery of Research ==
During his term as president of the academy (1991–2003), Werner Welzig initiated the establishment of the Galerie der Forschung (English: Gallery of Research). In 2005 the Gallery organised its pilot event "Mapping controversies: the case of the genetically modified food", which was staged in the Alte Aula in Vienna.

== Publications ==
Via its Austrian Academy of Sciences Press imprint, the academy publishes Medieval Worlds: Comparative & Interdisciplinary Studies, a biannual peer-reviewed open access academic journal covering Medieval studies. Other publications are the Corpus Scriptorum Ecclesiasticorum Latinorum and eco.mont – Journal on Protected Mountain Areas Research and Management. Also Memoranda of the Academy of Knowledge. Mathematical and natural science class (Denkschriften der Akademie der Wissenschaften), which was founded in 1850.
