= Olivier Dollfus =

French geographer

Olivier Dollfus (12 February 1931 – 1 February 2005) was a French geographer. His research interests included the physical geography of mountains, particularly the Andes, and the human geography of rural mountain populations.
