= Ulla Ehrensvärd =

Swedish librarian, curator and art historian

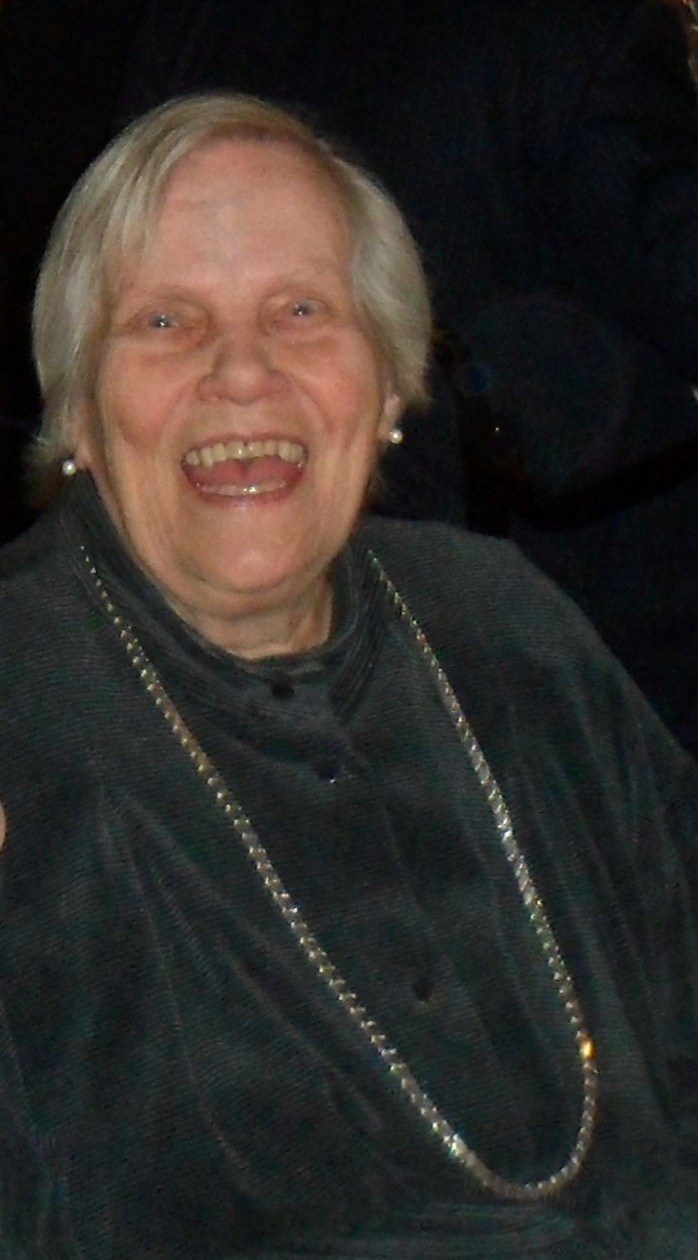
Ulla Ehrensvärd; 2013-02-15

Ulla Ehrensvärd (18 March 1927 — 17 April 2015) was a Swedish librarian, curator, and art historian, specializing in medals, architectural drawings, and maps.

== Early life ==
Eva Maria Ulla Margareta Ehrensvärd was born in Stockholm. She graduated from the Stockholm University of Applied Sciences in 1953. She earned a doctoral degree at Stockholm University while working in her field, defending her dissertation on medal engraver Erik Lindberg in 1974, at age 47. Her postdoctoral studies included a course in cartography at the Royal Institute of Technology in the 1970s.

== Career ==
During World War II, Ulla Ehrensvärd was a young volunteer aircraft spotter. She began her career as a librarian in 1946, at the Stockholm Public Library. She was hired to catalog books at the Royal Library of Sweden in 1953. She became an expert on Russian archives. In 1962 she traveled to the United States on a scholarship, to study museum libraries. She became head of the Maps and Prints Department of the National Library of Sweden in 1963, and she stayed there until 1981. From 1981 to 1993, she worked at the Military Archives.

Ehrensvärd had a long association with the Swedish Research Institute in Istanbul from 1976 to 1988, organizing their library, publishing their newsletter, arranging exhibits, and doing research in their collections. During the same time period, she was head of the Svensk Bokkonst (Swedish Book Design) show and competition. She was the Swedish representative on the International Cartographical Association, and helped to organized cartography conferences in Uppsala and Stockholm in 1988 and 1991. She gave a lecture at the Newberry Library in 1981, on color in cartography. She was also head of the history of cartography section of the Swedish Cartographic Society, from 1968 to 2001. She was the counted as one of the "Three Great Ladies of Cartography," along with Eila Campbell and Helen Wallis.

Ehrensvärd organized exhibitions on French drawings (1953), Erik Lindberg (1959), atlases (1966), globes (1966), A. E. Nordenskiöld (1968), color printing (1972), Edgar Chahine (1975), Turkish-Swedish contacts (1977), gnomes and Santa Claus figures (1978), sea charts and maps of Estonia (1980s). Publications by Ehrensvärd were equally diverse, including a book on gnomes, an inventory of Polish maps in Swedish archives, histories of Swedish maritime mapping and the maritime history of the Baltic region, and an edition of an eighteenth-century travelogue.

In 2004, Ehrensvärd accepted an award from the Royal Swedish Academy of Letters, History, and Antiquities, to travel for her research. Her book The History of the Nordic Map: From Myths to Reality was published in 2006, and considered a "born classic" in the history of cartography.

== Personal life ==
Ulla Ehrensvärd died in Stockholm in 2015, aged 88 years.
