= Murchison Award =

The Murchison Award, also referred to as the Murchison Grant, was first given by the Royal Geographical Society in 1882 for publications judged to have contributed most to geographical science in preceding recent years.

== Recipients ==
Source (1882–1982): British Museum
Source (1970 onwards) Royal Geographical Society

- 1882 Rev. Thomas Wakefield (1836–1901), Methodist missionary in East Africa
- 1883 Rev. William Deans Cowan, missionary, for journeys in Madagascar
- 1884 William Watts McNair
- 1885 Pandit Krishna
- 1886 Frank and Alexander Jardine, for overland expedition from Rockhampton to Cape York, Australia
- 1887 George Bourne
- 1888 J. McCarthy, for his map of Siam
- 1889 F.S. Arnott, for giving a suitable present to the chief Chitambo, of Ilala, for his services to Dr. Livingstone
- 1890 Vittorio Sella
- 1891 William Ogilvie
- 1892 Robert M.W. Swan (1858-1904) for his work at Great Zimbabwe with James Theodore Bent
- 1893 R.W. Senior, Indian Survey, for his work in the Kulu and Lahaul ranges of the Punjab Himalayas
- 1894 Capt. Joseph Wiggins, for his work in opening Kara Sea route to Siberia
- 1895 Eivind Astrup
- 1896 Sir Henry Thuillier
- 1897 Lieut. Seymour Vandeleur, for his journeys in Somaliland, Uganda, Unyoro, the Upper Nile, and the Niger region
- 1898 Herbert Warrington Smyth, for his several important journeys in Siam.
- 1899 Albert Armitage, for his valuable scientific observations in the Arctic
- 1900 Dr Henry Arctowski, for his oceanographical and meteorological work on the Belgian Antarctic Expedition
- 1901 John Coles, for his services to geography and the society as Map Curator
- 1902 John Stanley Gardiner
- 1903 Capt. Gunnar Isachsen
- 1904 Capt. William Colbeck, for his services to the Society while in command of the relief expeditions.
- 1905 William Wallace, for his services when he served as an official in Northern Nigeria.
- 1906 Maj. Henry Rodolph Davies, for his explorations in the Kachin Hills, the Shan States, Yunnan, Sechuan, and Siam
- 1907 Capt. G.E. Smith, for his surveys in British East Africa.
- 1908 Col. Delmé-Radcliffe, for his work in the Nile province of Uganda
- 1909 Capt. Cecil Godfrey Rawling, for survey and exploration in Tibet.
- 1910 Dr. Karl Skottsberg, for his work in the Magellan Straits
- 1911 Sir Wilfred Grenfell, for his work in Labrador.
- 1912 Capt. William Campbell Macfie, for his work on the Uganda Topographical Survey
- 1913 Maj. Hugh Drummond Pearson, for his surveys in the Sudan.
- 1914 Cmdr. Harry Lewin Lee Pennell, for his services to Scott's Antarctic Expedition, 1910-13
- 1915 Capt. John King Davis, for his work on the Australian Antarctic Expedition 1911-14
- 1916 Lieut-Col. Whitlock
- 1917 Rai Bahadur Lal Singh
- 1918 C.A. Reid
- 1919 Dr. W.M. Strong, for his journeys in New Guinea
- 1920 Maria Czaplicka
- 1921 Cmdnt. J. Maury, for his surveys in the Belgian Congo
- 1922 Charles Camsell, for explorations and surveys in northern Canada
- 1923 Capt. A.G. Stigand, for his map of Ngamiland
- 1924 J.H. Reynolds
- 1925 Eric Teichman
- 1926 Frank Debenham
- 1927 Capt. C.J. Morris, for his explorations on Mr. H. F. Montagnier’s expedition to Hunza.
- 1928 John Mathieson
- 1929 C.S. Elton
- 1930 Col. H. Wood, R.E.
- 1931 L.M. Nesbitt "for his journey through the Danakil country of Abyssinia"
- 1932 Dr. K.S. Sandford
- 1933 Dr. Noel Humphreys
- 1934 John Rymill
- 1935 R.P. Bishop, for his surveys in British Columbia
- 1936 Michael Leahy
- 1937 Martin Lindsay
- 1938 Ronald Kaufback
- 1939 Robert Bentham
- 1940 Peter Mott
- 1941 C.T. Madigan, for his explorations in Central Australia
- 1942 Sidney William Wooldridge and Flight-Lieut David Linton
- 1943-44 No award
- 1945 Lieut-Col W.E. Browne
- 1946 Lieut-Col Cecil Augustus Hart
- 1947 Gordon Manley
- 1948 Robert W. Steel
- 1949 Lieut-Col. E.H. Thompson, for original researches in the techniques of air survey
- 1950 Sgn-Cmdr Edward W. Bingham, R.N., for polar expeditions
- 1951 Dr. George Salt
- 1952 W.D.C. Wiggins, for contributions to cartography
- 1953 G.B. Stigant, for studies and mapping of the Japanese coasts
- 1954 Gerald R. Crone
- 1955 H.C.K Henderson, Birkbeck College
- 1956 Dr. Alice Garnett
- 1957 Dr George Colin Lawder Bertram for his zoological work at the Scott Polar Research Institute.
- 1958 Prof. E.G. Bowen, for studies in the geography of Wales
- 1959 Prof. S.P. Chatterjee, for his work in organising the national atlas of India
- 1960 Prof. James Wreford Watson
- 1961 Prof. Keith McPherson Buchanan
- 1962 Prof. S.H. Beaver
- 1963 Prof. Arthur Austin Miller
- 1964 Prof. Kenneth Charles Edwards
- 1965 Prof. John C. Swallow
- 1966 Prof. S.G. Davis
- 1967 Prof. Edmund William Gilbert
- 1968 C.T. Smith
- 1969 Prof. J.T. Coppock
- 1970 Iain R. Bishop
- 1971 Prof. J. W. House
- 1972 Prof. Emeritus William Gordon East
- 1973 Prof. William Bayne Fisher
- 1974 Prof. H. H. Lamb
- 1975 Prof. Akin L. Mabogunje
- 1976 Prof. Emeritus W. G. Hoskins CBE FBA
- 1977 Mr Harold Fullard
- 1978 Prof. Kenneth Walton
- 1979 Prof. Eila Campbell
- 1980 Mr. Clive Jermy
- 1981 Prof. C. Kidson
- 1982 Dr. Robert J. Bennett
- 1983 Prof. Richard Lawton
- 1984 Prof. Stanley Gregory
- 1985 Prof. Ron J. Johnston
- 1986 Mr David Bickmore
- 1987 Prof. Monica Cole
- 1988 Dr. Roger Tomlinson
- 1989 Prof. Emeritus Vernon S. Forbes
- 1990 Prof. Jim Rose
- 1991 Mr. Peter Clark
- 1992 Prof. William Buttiker
- 1993 Prof. Paul Claval
- 1994 Dr Andrew Warren
- 1995 Prof. Frank Oldfield
- 1996 Prof. Ronald A. Dodgshon
- 1997 Prof. Anne Buttimer
- 1998 Prof. Susan Smith
- 1999 Prof. Robert Woods
- 2000 Prof. Felix Driver
- 2001 Ann Savours Shirley
- 2002 Prof. David Woodward
- 2003 Prof. David Smith
- 2004 Dr. Tom Spencer
- 2005 Dr. Clive Oppenheimer
- 2006 Prof.Tony Gatrell
- 2007 not awarded
- 2008 Prof.Neil Wrigley
- 2009 Prof. Jenny Robinson
- 2010 Prof. Gerry Kearns
- 2011 Prof. Stuart Elden
- 2012 Prof. Gillian Rose
- 2013 Prof. Kelvyn Jones
- 2014 Prof. John Dearing
- 2015 Prof. Gill Valentine
- 2016 Prof. Parvati Raghuram
- 2017 Prof. Henry Wai-chung Yeung for “pioneering publications in the field of globalisation”.
- 2018 Mark Macklin, "for pioneering research in fluvial geomorphology and its environmental applications"
- 2019 Prof. Mark Birkin "for pioneering work on the development and application of urban analytics"
- 2020 Professor Peter Kraftl
- 2022 Professor David Hannah
- 2023 Professor Noel Castree

== See also ==
- List of geography awards
