= Eva Germaine Rimington Taylor =

Geographer and historian of science

Professor Eva G.R. Taylor
- Born: Eva Germaine Rimington Taylor; 22 June 1879; Highgate
- Died: 5 July 1966 (aged 87); Wokingham
- Awards: Victoria Medal, Royal Geographical Society (1947)

Academic work
- Discipline: History of Geography, History of Science, History of Mathematics
- Institutions: Birkbeck College, University of London
- Notable students: Eila Campbell
- Notable works: The Mathematical Practitioners of Tudor and Stuart England; The Mathematical Practitioners of Hanoverian England, 1714–1840

Eva Germaine Rimington Taylor (22 June 1879 – 5 July 1966) was a British geographer and historian of science, the first woman to hold an academic chair of geography in the United Kingdom. She is noted as co-author of a series of highly successful textbooks, and for her scholarly work on the history of geographical ideas, discovery, navigation, and surveying, mainly in 16th to 18th century England.

== Early life and education ==
Taylor was born on 22 June 1879 in Highgate. Her father was Charles Richard Taylor, a solicitor who worked in the city. Her mother was Emily Jane (née Nelson). Three years later, she left her husband. He would be a strict father to Eva and her older brother and sister, forbidding toys and pets in the house. She was educated at home and at the Camden School for Girls, the North London Collegiate School, and Royal Holloway College. She excelled in school work, as well as in singing and playing the piano. In 1903 she obtained a first class BSc in chemistry from the University of London.

== Career ==
After graduation, Taylor taught science at Burton Upon Trent School for Girls for two years, and in 1905 moved to the Convent School in Oxford, where she undertook further study at the University of Oxford. In 1906 she enrolled at the Oxford School of Geography and obtained her Diploma in Geography in 1908. From 1908 to 1910 she acted as a private research assistant to A. J. Herbertson, compiling and drawing wall maps. Herbertson had been one of her tutors in the Diploma course.

In 1910 Taylor moved to London. She began a relationship with Herbert Edward Dunhill, of the Dunhill tobacco dynasty. They lived together in Chelsea, and she had three sons, one of whom died in infancy. She wrote to Marie Stopes "I have taken (from conviction!) the rather drastic step of having children without being legally married to their father, so that I can sign myself, Yours Sincerely, Eva G. R. Taylor". Between 1910 and 1916 she wrote a number of successful geography textbooks in collaboration with John Frederick Unstead. The first of these, General and Regional Geography for Students (1910) developed Herbertson's scheme of major natural regions, using many maps to show topography, climate and vegetation of the various regions. These ideas influenced other British Geographers, including Leonard Brooks and Leonard Dudley Stamp. The book continued in print for over 40 years, the 15th edition being published in 1952.

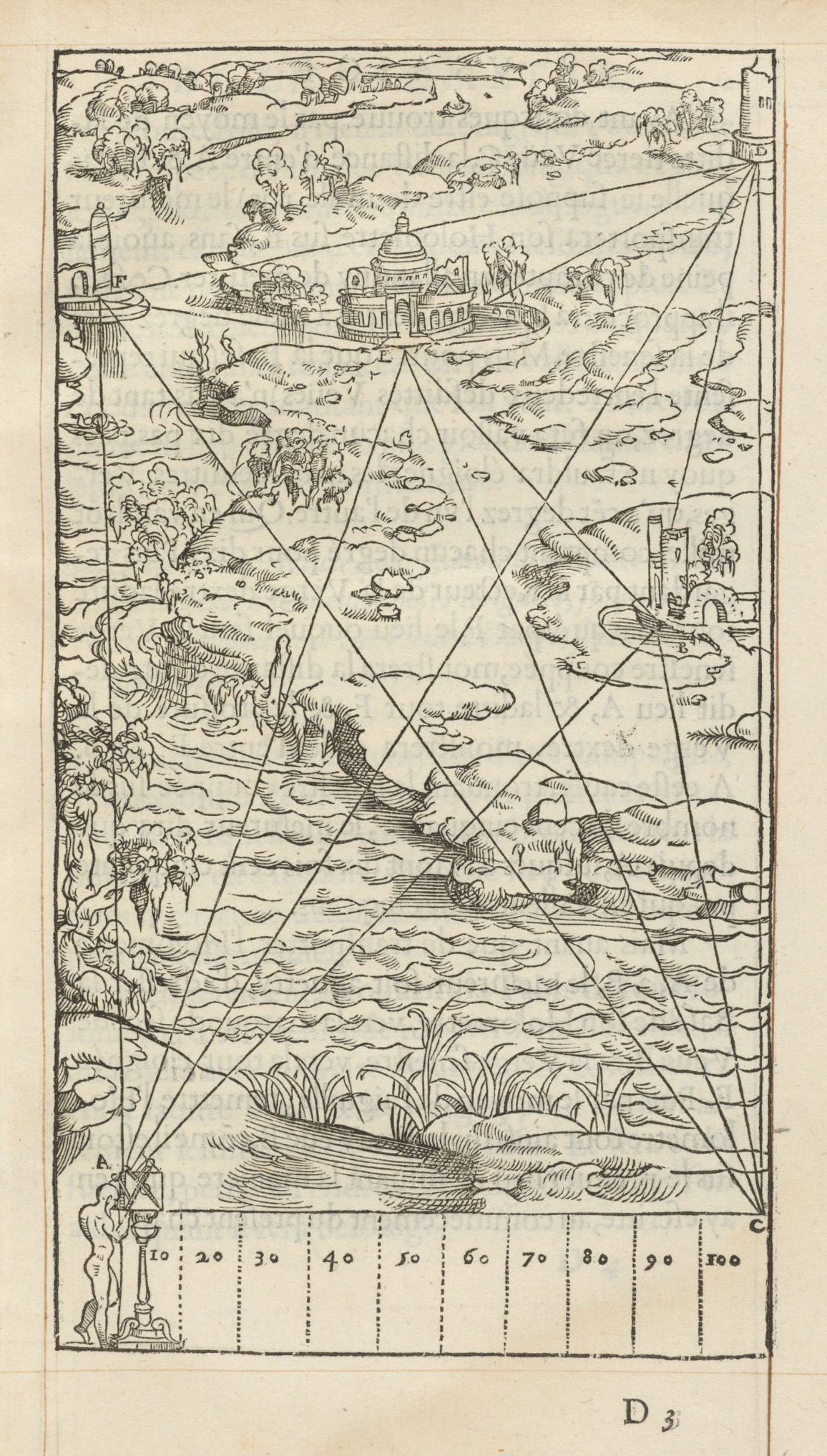
Use of the holometre, a type of plane table, in triangulation, 1561. Used as an illustration in Tudor Geography

From 1916 to 1918 she taught part-time at the Clapham Training College for Girls and at the Froebel Institute. In 1920 she became a part-time lecturer at the East London College (later Queen Mary College), and in 1921 became a part-time lecturer at Birkbeck College. She taught a variety of subjects at Birkbeck, including historical geography and the physical basis of geography. During this period she started her research on discovery, exploration, and the history of geographical knowledge. As her teaching duties were generally in the evening, she could spend large parts of the day working on manuscript sources and maps in the Public Record Office and the British Museum. Among the documents she discovered in the British Museum was a fire-damaged draft of a plan for the voyage by Francis Drake which would become his circumnavigation of the world (1577-1580). The historian Glyndwr Williams noted that this document "now forms the starting point of any discussion" of the motives behind Drake's expedition. Taylor submitted her research findings, including several published papers, under the title Studies in Tudor Geography and was awarded a DSc in geography from the University of London in 1930. Her examiners were Edward Heawood and Alexander Stevens. The work was published in book form as Tudor Geography, 1485–1583 (1930). The book shows how England was transformed from being on the margin of the known world to being on the threshold of the new discoveries. It deals with the major personalities involved in trade and exploration, both the voyagers and the sponsors and politicians. The role of John Dee, the court astronomer to Elizabeth I and the search for a route to Cathay are dealt with in detail, as are matters of surveying and navigation methods. An extensive catalogue of English works on geography, both manuscript and printed works, up to 1583 is provided. A review in Isis the journal of the History of Science Society described it as "by far the most important book yet published dealing with Elizabethan Science".

=== Head of department ===
Taylor was appointed chair of geography at Birkbeck College in 1930, succeeding her colleague John Frederick Unstead. She was the first woman to hold this position, though Helen Gwynne-Vaughan was the first woman professor to be appointed at the university. As professor and department head, Taylor was a member of the University Board of Studies in Geography, which regulated teaching of the subject, and a member of the University Higher Degrees Sub-Committee which reviewed research topics and titles and appointed examiners for Masters and Doctoral dissertations. She continued her historical researches, publishing Late Tudor and Early Stuart Geography 1583–1650 (1934), a sequel to her previous book, and scholarly articles and book reviews on topics such as navigation methods, ideas of the size and shape of the globe, and on individual explorers and cartographers, mostly of the 16th- and 17th-centuries. Taylor approached the history of geography and mathematics as a historian, discussing methods and practices as well as theories, and sought to reconstruct the history of the period "as men believed it to be". She sometimes pointed out the lack of historical understanding of her geographical colleagues, for example of the shape of the earth. Her 1931 paper Imago Mundi begins:

So slight is the attention paid to the history of geographical ideas that even geographers themselves fall into the popular error of supposing that Columbus sought to demonstrate to an incredulous Royal Commission that the earth is a sphere, and that it was left to Magellan to prove this fact to a still doubting public.

She goes on to give examples of texts from the 13th to 15th-centuries showing that the sphericity (or rotundity) of the earth was accepted by both scholarly and clerical opinion, and that disagreements were about the size of the earth, the disposition of land and water, and the possibility of the southern hemisphere being inhabited.

The idea of "a picture of the geography of the times" also found expression in a 1936 book edited by H.C. Darby, An Historical Geography of England before A.D. 1800. Darby, a young geographer from Cambridge, had met Taylor at a meeting to discuss historical geography held at the London School of Economics in January 1932. He was impressed with her approach and asked her to contribute. The book was planned as a series of cross-sections for particular periods, and Taylor contributed two chapters, one on John Leland (1503-1552), and one on William Camden (1551-1623). This enabled her to provide two pictures of England, one from the reign of Henry VIII, the other of Elizabeth I.

In the early 1930s Taylor joined the council of the Hakluyt Society and edited several of their published volumes. She was one of the founding members of the Institute of British Geographers (in 1992 merged with the Royal Geographical Society), created in 1933 as the professional body for university geographers. She also served on the Council of the RGS from 1931–1935 and from 1937–1941.

Taylor's work on planning became important from the late 1930s. She was a supporter of the idea of a National Atlas of Britain, chairing meetings and publishing several papers on the subject. The plan envisaged maps showing physical geography, bio-geography, industry and commerce, and human geography. Taylor noted the lack of maps as a way of summarising public data:

The enormous volumes of statistics that [government departments] collect are rarely if ever illuminated by being plotted in map form. Indeed they are often summarised and tabulated in ways that obscure geographical facts of great significance.

She stressed the value of a standard format to allow the results of work in different fields to be compared. and suggested that geographers had an important role to play in developing the project.

In the 1930s there was concern about disparities in economic activity and social conditions in Britain, in particular reflected in the decline of the older industrial areas while the London region was prospering. This led to the establishment in 1937 of the Royal Commission on the Distribution of Industrial Population, generally known as the Barlow Commission. The Royal Geographical Society was one of the bodies consulted, and Taylor convened a committee to prepare evidence for the Commission. This included a portfolio of forty-nine maps, which she considered an essential part of the evidence, revealing relationships not apparent from tables of statistics. The Commission was impressed by this evidence, which for example showed relationships among climate, housing and amenity, and health. During 1940 she was appointed to the national Panel on Reconstruction, chaired by Lord Reith. Together with Leonard Dudley Stamp she prepared maps for planning, showing physical features, land use, movement of population, industry and communications. She also contributed to the work of the Association for Planning and Regional Reconstruction during and after World War II and to the Schuster committee on planning.

During the war, the staff of the college was reduced, but Taylor continued teaching assisted by Christie Willatts, Alfred Moodie and Eila Campbell, then a Masters student who would go on to become professor of geography in Birkbeck in 1970. Taylor trained officers in the eastern command in map-reading and interpretation. She lectured on airways of empire.

=== Retirement and after ===
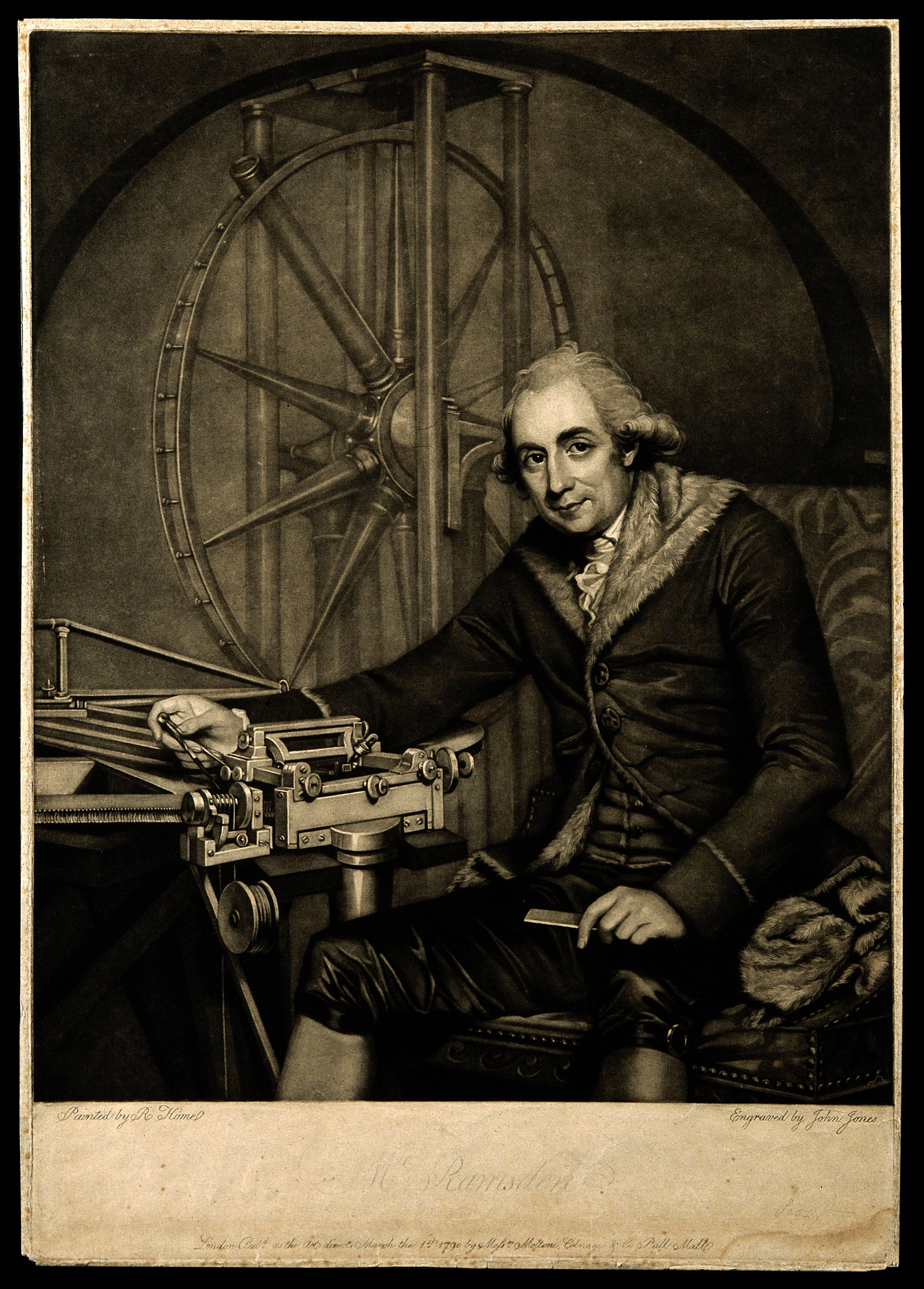
Jesse Ramsden, celebrated maker of optical instruments. Illustration used by Taylor in The mathematical practitioners of Hanoverian England.

In 1944, Taylor retired from her position as chair and became professor emeritus. She continued to do research in her retirement, publishing numerous original papers on navigation and cartography, as well as book reviews. She also published articles in magazines aimed at a more general readership, such as The Geographical Magazine and The Listener on topics including population growth and planning. In 1954, ten years after her retirement, The mathematical practitioners of Tudor and Stuart England appeared and in 1966 its sequel The mathematical practitioners of Hanoverian England. Both books used the format of a narrative section followed by biographies of the practitioners and a bibliography. Reviewing the earlier book, the historian of science Derek J. Price praised the book for throwing light on the important role of people who were not academic scholars, but "artisans, navigators, mechanics, and instructors in these arts". He also highlighted how the book documents the "complete divorce between practice and theory" that characterised the beginning of this period, how practitioners became teachers, and how the divorce began gradually to be broken down. Alfred Rupert Hall described it as a "fascinating cross-section through that aspect of the scientific revolution in England which was most clearly practical and of general concern to contemporaries". Francis Johnson regarded it as a valuable pioneering work, but drew attention to the lack of citations to the sources of her information, which he regarded as the major weakness of the work. Henry Calvet, reviewing the later book praised her narrative style, and her achievement in making so much information available in such a limited space. He also commented on the difficulty of finding sources for her statements, and on a number of errors that he attributed to her failing health. But he regarded it as an important book in spite of its imperfections.

A book designed for a more general readership was The Haven-Finding Art (1956). The scope of this book is indicated by its subtitle A History of Navigation from Odysseus to Captain Cook. In the book, she dismisses the myth that ancient sailors navigated by "hugging the shore". While there certainly was coastal sailing (then as now) she provides evidence of deep-water sailing from early times, and also points out, though not herself a sailor, that close to the shore was not necessarily a safe place to be. Kenneth Collins, Hydrographer of the Navy, underlines the point in his foreword: "Nothing is more fraught with peril, and therefore more assiduously avoided on a little known coast, than hugging the shore". After an introduction, Taylor presents four sections organised according to the methods available to the navigator: without magnetic compass or chart; with compass and chart; instruments and tables; and mathematical navigation. She describes methods that have been in use from ancient to modern times, such as observations of sun and stars, and the sounding line, as well as those that have been superseded, such as releasing shore-sighting birds, and noting whether winds are warm or cold, dry or moist. She ends with the Nautical Almanac, Hadley's octant, and Harrison's chronometer, which between them brought the pre-scientific age of navigation to a close.

In the last few years of her life, Taylor was disabled and unable to travel, but still enjoyed her work. She was supported in her later work by Eila Campbell. She died in Wokingham on 5 July 1966.

Taylor's work on the history of geography was ground-breaking in a number of ways. She interpreted geography in "its widest sense, to include voyages and travels; maps and survey; mathematical geography and navigation; general regional and descriptive geography; human physical and historical geography; physiography and economic geography". She investigated the geography of a period as the participants saw it, and the participants were not just the scholars, but the practitioners - the sailors and navigators, surveyors, explorers, and those who laid the mathematical foundations for technical development, made the instruments, and taught others how to use them. In her earlier work she dealt with men like William Bourne, Abel Foullon and Jean Rotz. The later Mathematical Parctioners books identified and described thousands of individuals who contributed to mathematical developments relevant to geography. Her work was generally well-received, but there were also criticisms, as summarised by the Dutch historian Peter De Clercq. The most telling criticism from the perspective of other researchers was the limited amount of information given about sources, particularly from unpublished manuscripts, making it difficult for others to pick up where she left off. The reliability of some of her data, particularly in her later work, has been questioned. But her work set a new standard for the field. De Clercq cites Stephen Johnston as pointing out that the Mathematical Practitioners was a classic text "in which the historical terrain of mathematical practive was first identified and its coherence demonstrated at length". Taylor's work was built upon by later workers such as Peter and Ruth Wallis and Gloria Clifton. Peter Wallis commented that "The best tribute to Professor Taylor is to continue the work recorded in these two volumes".

=== Honours and awards ===
Taylor was a recipient of the Victoria Medal of the Royal Geographical Society in 1947 and was made honorary fellow in 1965. She was one of the first Fellows of Birkbeck College, and an Honorary Member of the British Society for the History of Science (BSHS) and of the Royal Institute of Navigation. She was the President of the geography section of the British Association for the Advancement of Science twice. The Society for Nautical Research made her honorary vice-president. She was awarded an honorary degree by the University of Aberdeen.

The Eva G. R. Taylor Lecture series on "subjects related to the disciplines to which Professor Taylor's studies made such brilliant contributions" was sponsored by the Royal Institute of Navigation, the BSHS, the Society for Nautical Research and Birkbeck College. It was created to celebrate her 80th birthday and continued after her death.

== Selected bibliography ==
A comprehensive bibliography is provided in the obituary published by the Royal Geographical Society in 1968.

With J. F. Unstead: All published by G. Philip & Son.

- — (1910) General and Regional Geography for Students
- — (1911) Geography of the British Isles
- — (1911) Commercial Geography, General and Regional
- — (1912) The Essentials of World Geography for Junior Students
- — (1912–1916) Philip's Comparative Series of Wall Atlases of the Continents

By E.G.R. Taylor:

- — (1930). Tudor Geography, 1485–1583. London: Methuen.
- — (1934). Late Tudor and Early Stuart Geography, 1583–1650. London: Methuen.
- — (1936). "Leland's England". In Darby, H.C. (ed.). An Historical Geography of England Before 1800: Fourteen Studies. Cambridge University Press. pp. 330–353.
- — (1936). "Camden's England". In Darby, H.C. (ed.). An Historical Geography of England Before 1800: Fourteen Studies. Cambridge University Press. pp. 354–386.
- — (1937). "Robert Hooke and the Cartographical Projects of the Late Seventeenth Century (1666–1696)". The Geographical Journal. 90 (6): 529–540. Bibcode:1937GeogJ..90..529T. doi:10.2307/1787651. JSTOR 1787651.
- — (1941). "Notes on John Adams and Contemporary Map Makers". The Geographical Journal. 97 (3): 182–184. Bibcode:1941GeogJ..97..182T. doi:10.2307/1787329. JSTOR 1787329.
- — (1947). ""They rejoiced in things stark naughty". Some Elizabethans at sea". The Geographical Magazine. 20: 304–309.
- — (1948). "Geography and you - and me". The Geographical Magazine. 21: 281–287.
- — (1949). "The measure of the degree: 300 B.C.- A.D. 1700". Geography. 34 (3): 121–131. ISSN 0016-7487. JSTOR 40564341.
- — (1950). "The menace of monstrous cities". The Listener. 43: 694–695.<
- — (1954). The Mathematical Practitioners of Tudor and Stuart England. Cambridge (England): Published for the Institute of Navigation at the University Press.
- — (1955). "John Dee and the map of North-East Asia". Imago Mundi. 12 (1): 103–106. doi:10.1080/03085695508592094. ISSN 0308-5694.
- — (1956). The Haven-Finding Art: a History of Navigation from Odysseus to Captain Cook. London: Hollis & Carter. Second Edition, 1971
- — (1958). "The Earth but a Satellite of the Sun". Journal of Navigation. 11 (2): 150–156. doi:10.1017/S0373463300038844. ISSN 0373-4633.
- — (1961). "Drake's secret voyage". The Geographical Magazine. 34: 185–194.
- — (1964). "A Log-Book of Magellan's Voyage, 1519–1522". Journal of Navigation. 17 (1): 83–87. doi:10.1017/S0373463300030976. ISSN 0373-4633.
- — (1966). The Mathematical Practitioners of Hanoverian England, 1714–1840. Cambridge (England): Published for the Institute of Navigation at the University Press.

Published by the Hakluyt Society, with notes and/or editing by E.G.R. Taylor

- — (1932) A Brief Summe of Geographie by Roger Barlow. Edited with an Introduction and Notes by E. G. R. Taylor
- — (1933) Select Documents illustrating the Four Voyages of Columbus. Vol. II: The Third and Fourth Voyages. With a Supplementary Introduction by E. G. R. Taylor
- — (1935) Writings & Correspondence of the Two Richard Hakluyts. With an Introduction and Notes by E. G. R. Taylor
- — (1953) Mandeville's Travels. Texts and Translations By Malcolm Letts, F.S.A. Volume I. The text of British Library Egerton MS 1982, with an essay on the cosmographical ideas of Mandeville's day by E. G. R. Taylor
- — (1959) The Troublesome Voyage of Captain Edward Fenton, 1582-1583. Narratives & Documents Edited by E. G. R. Taylor
- — (1963) A Regiment for the Sea and other Writings on Navigation. by William Bourne of Gravesend, a Gunner (c. 1535-1582) / Edited by E. G. R. Taylor
