= Eila Campbell =

University teacher and historian of cartography (1915–1994)

Eila Muriel Joice Campbell
- Born: Eila Muriel Joice Campbell; 15 December 1915
- Died: 12 July 1994 (aged 78); London, England
- Occupation: Geographer
- Awards: Murchison Award (1979); R. V. Tooley Award (1989)

Academic background
- Education: Birkbeck College, University of London

Academic work
- Discipline: Cartography
- Institutions: Birkbeck College, University of London

Eila Muriel Joice Campbell (15 December 1915 – 12 July 1994) was an English geographer and cartographer. She was best known for her work on Domesday Geography of England and her work on the international journal, Imago Mundi.

== Early life and education ==
Campbell was born on 15 December 1915. She was educated at Bournemouth School for Girls and Brighton Diocesan Training College. After graduating from Birkbeck College, University of London in 1941, Campbell worked as a teacher in Southall, west London while also working as a part-time assistant at Birkbeck College. Campbell received an MA with distinction from Birkbeck in 1946.

== Career ==
Campbell began working at Birkbeck College as an assistant lecturer in 1945. She worked closely with Eva Germaine Rimington Taylor, supporting publication of her final book and establishing a lecture in her name.

Campbell continued to work at Birkbeck throughout her academic career. She was made a lecturer in 1948, reader in 1963 and in 1970 became a full professor and the head of the geography department at the college. She retired from Birkbeck in 1981.

Campbell was chosen by Henry Clifford Darby to jointly edit his book, Domesday Geography of England, to which she also contributed. She edited the international journal, Imago Mundi, for 20 years.

Campbell was also a long term member of the councils of the Society for Nautical Research and the Hakluyt Society and was the honorary secretary of the latter organisation for around 20 years.

She was also a long term member of the Royal Geographical Society. Between 1971 and 1975, she served on the society's council and was a member of the library and maps committee for over 20 years. Campbell was president of the society's sub-committee for cartography.

The Royal Society awarded her with the Murchison Award in 1979. She retired in 1981. Professor Campbell was awarded with the R. V. Tooley Award from the International Map Collectors' Society in 1989.

Hoonaard reports that Campbell's topic of research was becoming unfashionable in her later life and that after her death on 12 July 1994, courses on the history of cartography disappeared from the University of London's curriculum and replaced with courses which instead focused on quantitative techniques.

Birkbeck established a series of lectures on geography in her name in 1995.
