= Unstead =

Unstead is a surname. Notable people with the surname include:

- John Unstead (1790–1872), English cricketer
- R. J. Unstead (1915–1988), British historian
- John Frederick Unstead, English geographer
