= Dislocating the Orient =

2017 monograph by Daniel Foliard

Dislocating the Orient: British Maps and the Making of the Middle East, 1854–1921
- Author: Daniel Foliard
- Language: English
- Subject: Cartography, British Empire, History of the Middle East, Cultural geography
- Publisher: University of Chicago Press
- Publication date: 2017
- Publication place: United Kingdom
- Media type: Print (Hardcover, Paperback)
- Pages: 320
- ISBN: 978-0-226-61522-6

Dislocating the Orient: British Maps and the Making of the Middle East, 1854–1921 is a 2017 academic history book by Daniel Foliard, a professor at the University of Paris. The book was published by the University of Chicago Press.

== Reception ==
John Fisher, a historian at University of the West of England, praised Dislocating the Orient in The American Historical Review, calling it "an outstanding book: highly original, penetrating, elegantly written, and handsomely produced". In Imago Mundi, Carleton University scholar Luke Struckman wrote that it was "an exceptional and important book for historians of cartography, scholars of the Middle East and military-studies researchers".

The Times Literary Supplement reviewer Helen Mackreath said the book was "a rich and valuable contribution to the body of work on Orientalism". John M. Willis of the University of Colorado stated in The Journal of Modern History, "Even with these criticisms, however, Foliard has produced a study that will no doubt become the standard work on cartography and the emergence of the Middle East."
