= Richard Taunton Sixth Form College =

Location
- Hill Lane; Southampton, Hampshire, SO15 5RL; England; 50.92657°N 1.41728°W

Information
- Type: Sixth form college
- Established: 1760
- Founder: Richard Taunton
- Local authority: Southampton
- Department for Education URN: 145228 Tables
- Ofsted: Reports
- Principal: Andy Grant
- Gender: Coeducational
- Age: 16 to 18
- Enrolment: 1000
- Website: www.richardtaunton.ac.uk

Richard Taunton Sixth Form College, until 2012 called Taunton's College, is a sixth form college in Upper Shirley, Southampton attended by approximately 750 students. It is part of the Lighthouse Learning Trust, along with St Vincent Sixth Form College in Gosport.

== Admissions ==
It offers a range of T levels and vocational courses, but mostly A Levels.

It is to the west of Southampton Common next to the Bellemoor pub at the junction of Hill Lane and Bellemoor Road. Near to the south is King Edward VI School, Southampton.

== History ==
=== Foundation ===
Taunton's School was founded in 1760 by Richard Taunton, former mayor of Southampton. In 1864 it moved to a specially built premises on New Road. In 1875 it was established as an endowed school, to be called Taunton's Trade School. The school became a public secondary school and the name changed once more to Taunton's School.

=== Grammar school ===
In 1926, the school moved to a new site on Highfield Road. It was officially opened by Eustace Percy, 1st Baron Percy of Newcastle (then the Coalition Conservative MP for Hastings) on 26 April 1927. It was administered by the City of Southampton Education Committee. In 1968 it had around 850 boys.

=== Sixth form college ===
In 1969, it was reorganised as a sixth form college for boys and renamed to Richard Taunton College. From 1978 girls were admitted.

=== Hill College ===
Meanwhile, in 1858, the Southampton College and High School for Girls was founded. In 1936 it moved to a site on Hill Lane. In 1967, it was reorganised as a sixth form college for girls and renamed to Southampton College for Girls. Boys were admitted from September 1978, along with a name change to Hill College, reflecting the location of the college.

=== Merger ===
In 1989 the two colleges merged using the name Taunton's College although the Hill Lane site was refurbished and moved into in 1993.

=== Redevelopment proposal 2007 ===
A 2007 redevelopment proposal for Taunton's College, on Hill Lane in Southampton, which proposed replacement of nearly all the buildings on the site including the main building completed in 1937 as the Southampton Grammar School for Girls was formally cancelled by June 2009.

Funds hoped for the redevelopment of many sixth form and Further Education colleges throughout England were revealed earlier in 2009 to be insufficient for a mooted major national programme of rebuilds, Building Schools for the Future. Taunton's proposal was one of many which could not be funded.

=== Name Change ===
On 11 July 2012, Taunton's College changed its name to Richard Taunton Sixth Form College.

== Notable former pupils ==
=== Taunton's School ===
- Ronald Allison, Press Secretary to Queen Elizabeth II
- Brian Barry, Lieber Professor of Political Philosophy from 1998–2005 at Columbia University, New York
- Daniel Beak, army officer and recipient of the Victoria Cross
- Martin Bell, poet
- Paul Bennett, footballer
- Robert Bennett, geographer, Cambridge University
- John Benyon (criminologist)
- Eugene Bernard, footballer
- Major Geoffrey Brain, GHQ Liaison Regiment (Phantom), 1943-45
- Sir John Butters, Chief Commissioner of Australia’s Federal Capital Commission
- Alfred Augustus Levi Caesar, geographer, Cambridge University
- Martin Chivers, footballer
- Norman Cole, footballer
- Kenneth Connell, historian
- George Robert Graham Conway, civil engineer and historian
- N. J. Crisp, playwright
- Denis Henry Desty, scientist and inventor
- Sir William Arthur Dring, General Manager, East India Railway
- Gavyn Davies, BBC Chairman
- Major James Dunning, wartime commando instructor and historian
- John Eldridge, sociologist
- Don Finlay, Olympic athlete and Battle of Britain pilot
- Trevor Gardner, colonial and university administrator
- Edward Grayson (barrister), barrister and author
- David Haller, Olympic swimmer and coach
- John Hemmings (academic), scholar of French literature
- Benny Hill, comedian
- Bertram Maurice Hobby, entomologist
- Clive Hollick, Baron Hollick, chief executive from 1996–2005 of United Business Media
- Eric James, Baron James of Rusholme, first Vice-Chancellor from 1962–73 of the University of York
- David Charles Joy, pioneer in electron microscopy
- David Keeble, economic geographer
- Charles Knott, cricketer
- Bernard Lee, actor
- Jack Mantle, VC
- Sir Ian Mills, Chairman, NHS Executive, London
- Bob Mitchell, Labour MP from 1971–83 for Southampton Itchen, and from 1966–70 for Southampton Test
- Eric Moon, librarian
- Dominic Muldowney, composer, and Music Director from 1976–97 of the Royal National Theatre
- Air Commodore Frank Padfield, first programme director of the Skynet British military satellite system
- Sir Donald Perrott, UK Atomic Energy Authority
- Julian Peto
- Sir Richard Peto, Professor of Medical Statistics and Epidemiology since 1992 at the University of Oxford
- Dick Rowley, footballer
- Ken Russell, film director
- Harry Simmons, Olympic athlete
- Sydney William Smith, Chief Assayer, The Royal Mint, 1926-38
- John Stonehouse, former politician who notoriously faked his own death in 1974
- Samuel John Truscott, Royal School of Mines
- Derek Tulk, cricketer
- Reginald Eldred Witt, classicist

=== Taunton's College ===
- Caity Baser, musician
- Alex Bellos, writer
- Craig David, musician
- Gareth Bale, Welsh international footballer
- Chris Packham, naturalist and television presenter
- Chris Tremlett, cricketer
- Manisha Tank, presents World Report on CNN
- Theo Walcott, English international footballer
