= Edward Gilbert (disambiguation) =

Edward Gilbert was an American newspaper editor and California politician.

Edward Gilbert may also refer to:

- Eddie Gilbert (cricketer) (1905–1978), Australian Aboriginal cricketer
- Eddie Gilbert (wrestler) (1961–1995), American wrestler
- Ed Gilbert (ice hockey) (born 1952), retired Canadian ice hockey forward
- Edward Joseph Gilbert (1936–2025), Roman Catholic Archbishop of Port of Spain, Trinidad and Tobago
- Edward A. Gilbert (1854–1935), Nebraska politician

Ed Gilbert may also refer to:

- Ed Gilbert (1931–1999), American actor
- Edmund William Gilbert (1900–1973), British social geographer
- Edgar Gilbert (1923–2013), American mathematician and coding theorist
