= Tulk =

Tulk is a surname. Notable people with the surname include:

- Augustus H. Tulk (1810–1873), Australian librarian, son of Charles Augustus Tulk
- Beaton Tulk (1944–2019), Premier of Newfoundland and Labrador
- Charles Augustus Tulk (1786–1849), English Swedenborgian and politician
- Derek Tulk (born 1934), English cricketer
