= Michael Chisholm =

Michael Chisholm may refer to:

- Michael Chisholm (politician)
- Michael Chisholm (geographer)
