= Naval Intelligence Handbooks =

The British Naval Intelligence Division Geographical Handbook Series was produced between 1941 and 1946. At 31 titles, encompassing 58 volumes, this is the largest single body of geographical writing ever published. The books were written to provide information for the Allied war effort. They were written by academics in two teams, one based in Cambridge and the other at Oxford. As lives depended on the information presented in the Handbooks, speed of production and accuracy of content were paramount. After the war, many of these handbooks were re-published, in modified form, as textbooks.

The Geographical Section of the Naval Intelligence Division, Naval Staff, Admiralty, also produced a series of Handbooks from 1917 to 1922 covering the same Geographical topics as World War II series above. They are listed below;

== Content ==
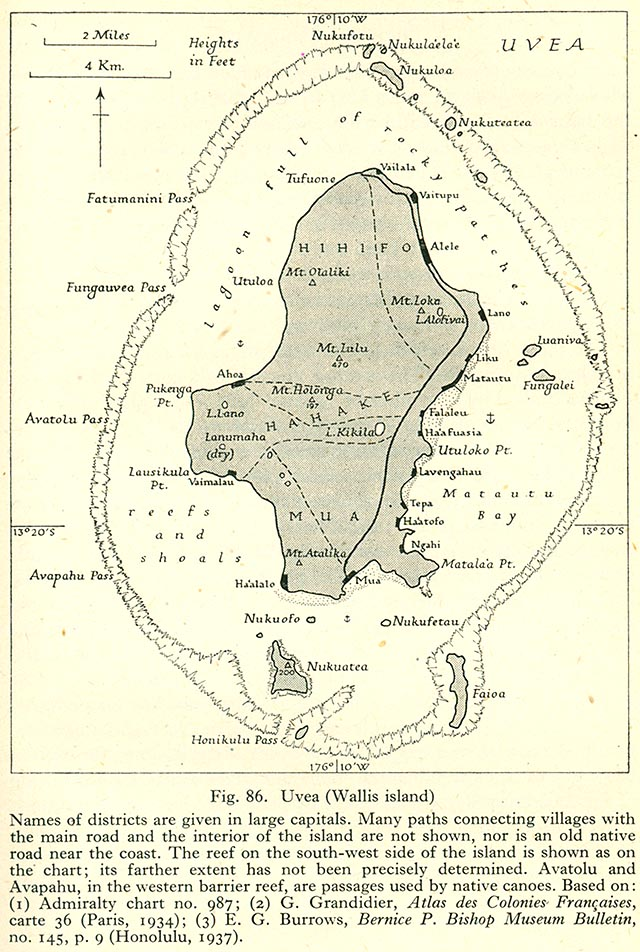
Uvea wallis island

Although entitled Naval Intelligence Handbooks, the Handbooks were intended for use by all of the British Armed Forces, and covered whole countries, not just the coastal regions. Topics included relief, coasts, climate, peopling, history, administration, population geography (trends and migration), economic geography and transport geography. Additional information, such as vegetation zones and medical notes, was provided in appendices.

== The published Handbooks, year of publication and location of team ==
(30 volumes produced at Cambridge; 28 at Oxford. All were published by HMSO in London)

- Albania, B.R. 542 (1945, Oxford)
- Algeria, B.R. 505 (2 vols: volume 1, 1944; volume 2, 1944) (Oxford)
- The Belgian Congo, B.R. 522 (1944, Oxford)
- Belgium, B.R. 521 (1944, Cambridge)
- China Proper, B.R. 530-530B (3 vols: volume 1, 1944; volume 2, "Modern History and Administration", 1945; volume 3, "Economic Geography, Ports and Communications", 1945) (Cambridge)
- Corsica, B.R. 508 (1942, Cambridge)
- Denmark, B.R. 509 (1944, Cambridge)
- Dodecanese, B.R. 500 (1943, Oxford)
- France, B.R. 503-503C (4 vols: volume 1, "Physical geography", 1942; volume 2, "History and administration", 1942; volume 3, "Economic geography", 1942; volume 4, "Ports and communications", 1942) (Cambridge)
- French Equatorial Africa and Cameroons, B.R. 515 (1942, Oxford)
- French West Africa, B.R. 512, 512A (2 vols: volume 1, "The Federation", 1943; volume 2, "The Colonies", 1944) (Oxford)
- Germany, B.R. 529-529C (4 vols: volume 1, "Physical Geography", 1944; volume 2, "History and Administration", 1944; volume 3, "Economic Geography", 1944; volume 4, "Ports & Communications", 1944) (Cambridge)
- Greece, B.R. 516, 516A, 516B (3 vols: volume 1, "Physical Geography History Administration & Peoples", 1944; volume 2, "Economic Geography Ports and Communications", 1944; volume 3, "Regional Geography", 1944) (Cambridge)
- Iceland, B.R. 504 (1942, Cambridge)
- Indo-China, B.R. 510 (1943, Cambridge)
- Iraq and the Persian Gulf, B.R. 524 (1944, Oxford)
- Italy, B.R. 517-517C (4 vols: volume 1, 1944; volume 2, "History, Administration, Peoples", 1944; volume 3, 1944; volume 4 1944) (Oxford)
- Jugoslavia, B.R. 493, 493A, 493B (3 vols: volume 1, "Physical Geography", 1944; volume 2, "History, Peoples and Administration", 1944; volume 3, "Economic Geography, Ports and Communications", 1944) (Cambridge)
- Luxembourg, B.R. 528 (1944, Cambridge)
- Morocco, B.R. 506 (2 vols: volume 1, 1942; volume 2, 1942) (Oxford)
- Netherlands, B.R. 549 (1944, Cambridge)
- Netherlands East Indies, B.R. 518, 518A (2 vols: volume 1, 1944; volume 2, 1944) (Cambridge)
- Norway, B.R. 501, 501A (2 vols: volume 1, 1943; volume 2, 1943) (Oxford)
- Pacific Islands, B.R. 519-519C (4 vols: volume 1, "General Survey", 1945; volume 2: "Eastern Pacific", 1943; volume 3, "Western Pacific (Tonga to the Solomon Islands)", 1944; volume 4, "Western Pacific (New Guinea and Islands Northwards, 1945) (Cambridge)
- Palestine and Transjordan, B.R. 514 (1943, Oxford)
- Persia, B.R. 525 (1945, Oxford)
- Spain and Portugal, B.R. 502 (4 vols: volume 1, "The Peninsula", 1945; volume 2, "Portugal", 1945; volume 3, "Spain", 1945; volume 4, "The Atlantic Islands", 1945) (Oxford)
- Syria, B.R. 513 (1943, Oxford)
- Tunisia, B.R. 523 (1945, Oxford)
- Turkey, B.R. 507, 507A (2 vols: volume 1, 1942; volume 2, 1942) (Oxford)
- Western Arabia and the Red Sea, B.R. 527 (1946, Oxford)

World War I series (all published by HMSO);

- I.D. 447 Abyssinia (Volume 1) (1917)
- I.D. 908 Morocco (1919)
- I.D. 1020? River Danube (date?)
- I.D. 1055 German East Africa (1920)
- I.D. 1096 Serbia, Montenegro, Albania and adjacent parts of Greece (1920)
- I.D. 1114 Macedonia and surrounding territories (1920)
- I.D. 1128 Arabia (volume 1, "General" (1916); volume 2 "Routes" w/ 4 folding maps (1917))
- I.D. 1129 Turkey in Europe (1920)
- I.D. 1155 Bulgaria (1920)
- I.D. 1161 Portuguese Nyasaland (1920)
- I.D. 1162 Libya (1920)
- I.D. 1168 Belgium and adjoining territories (1918)
- I.D. 1174 French Guiana (1919)
- I.D. 1177 Mesopotamia and its borderlands (4 vols: volume 1, "General"; volume 2, "Iraq, Lower Karun and Luristan"; volume 3, "Central Mesopotamia"; volume 4, "Northern Mesopotamia") (1918)
- I.D. 1189 Portuguese East Africa (1920)
- I.D. 1199 A Manual on the Turanians and pan-Turanianism (1920)
- I.D. 1204 Roumania (1920)
- I.D. 1205 Mexico (1919)
- I.D. 1207 Siberia and Arctic Russia (Volume 1, "General" (1918); more volumes?)
- I.D. 1208 Finland (date?)
- I.D. 1209 Netherlands India (Dutch East Indies) (1920)
- I.D. 1211 Alsace-Lorraine (1919)
- I.D. 1213 Belgian Congo (1919)
- I.D. 1214 Norway and Sweden (both in same volume) (1920)
- I.D. 1215 Syria (1920)
- I.D. 1216 Kenya Colony (British East Africa and protectorate Zanzibar) (1920)
- I.D. 1217 Uganda Protectorate (1920)
- I.D. 1218 Anglo-Egyptian Sudan (1922)
- I.D. 1219 Turkey (1920).
- I.D. 1221 Greece (Volume 1, "The Mainland of Old Greece and Certain Neighbouring Islands", 1918; vol. 2.1 "The Cyclades and Northern Sporades" (C.B. 837 A (1)), 1919; vol. 2.2 "The Islands of the Northern and Eastern Aegean" (C.B. 837 A (2)), 1919; vol. 3 "Crete" (C.B. 837 A (3)), 1919)
- C.B. 847 A-B Asia Minor (4 vols: volume 1, "General", 1919; volume 2, "Western Asia Minor", is C.B. 847 B, 1919)

== Team members (selected) ==
- Stanley H. Beaver (Cambridge)
- Robert Percy Beckinsale (Oxford)
- A. E. P. Collins (Cambridge)
- John Winter Crowfoot (Oxford)
- Henry Clifford Darby (Editor in Chief) (Cambridge)
- Dr J. W. Davidson (Cambridge)
- Elwyn Davies (Cambridge)
- Dr Margaret Davies (Cambridge)
- A. Digby (Cambridge)
- Raymond Firth (Cambridge)
- Walter Fogg (Oxford)
- Idris L. Foster (Cambridge)
- D. W. Fryer (Cambridge)
- E. W. Gilbert (Oxford)
- C. F. W. R. Gullick (Oxford)
- Dr J. V. Harrison (Oxford)
- A. H. Hyamson (Oxford)
- J. R. James (Cambridge)
- H. A. Jensen (Cambridge)
- A. F. Martin (Oxford)
- Professor Kenneth Mason (Oxford)
- Francis John Monkhouse (Cambridge)
- F. W. Morgan (Cambridge)
- Sir John Linton Myres (Oxford)
- A. C. O'Dell (Cambridge)
- E. J. Passant (Cambridge)
- Brian B. Roberts (Cambridge)
- K. S. Sandford (Oxford)
- Dr Hugh Scott (Oxford)
- Eileen Steel (Oxford)
- Robert Steel (Oxford)
- John Corrie Stuttard (Cambridge)
- Thomas Gaskell Tutin (Cambridge)
- Norman White (Oxford)
- Brigadier Harold St. John Loyd Winterbotham (Oxford)
- Sir James Mann Wordie (Cambridge)
