= Raleigh Ashlin Skelton =

Archivist, librarian and cartographer

Raleigh Ashlin Skelton (21 December 1906 – 7 December 1970) was a British archivist, librarian, and historian of cartography. He is known for his attempts to prove the authenticity of the Vinland map.

== Life ==
An enigmatic personality, Skelton was always known to his friends as "Peter", although he published under his legal name. He was born in Plymouth, and educated at Aldenham School and Pembroke College, Cambridge. He served as an assistant keeper in the Department of Printed Books of the British Museum from 1931 to 1953.

From 1939 to 1945 he served in the Royal Artillery in the Middle East and Italy. In early 1945 he was assigned to the Monuments, Fine Arts, and Archives program in Austria. He is recognised on the website of the Monuments Men and Women Foundation for his work at Stift Hohenfurth, a monastery used by Adolf Hitler as storage for looted treasures intended for the Führermuseum.

He returned to the British Museum as Deputy Keeper and began work in the Map Room of the British Museum upon his return from military service in 1945. In 1950 he became the Superintendent, in which post he continued until his retirement in 1967.

Skelton was instrumental in developing a vision for a cartography centre at the Newberry Library in Chicago as part of a residency in 1966. He gave the inaugural Nebenzahl Lecture.

He died in a car crash in December 1970.

== Works ==
- The Vinland Map and the Tartar Relation, written with Thomas E. Marston, and George Painter, by Yale University Press,
- History of Cartography (with Leo Bagrow), originally published in London and Cambridge by C. A. Watts and Harvard University Press in 1964.
- Skelton wrote a number of articles and books on maps of explorers including Captain James Cook's maps of Newfoundland, including The Marine Surveys of Captain James Cook in North America 1758-1768, and the English translation and commentary to the facsimile edition of Antonio Pigafetta's narrative account of the first circumnavigation by Magellan (1519–1522), Yale University Press, 1969.

== Professional activities ==
Skelton served as the Honorary Secretary of the Hakluyt Society from 1946 to 1966.

He was the General Editor of Imago Mundi, the major journal in the field of the history of cartography, from 1957 to 1970. This was a collaboration with R. V. Tooley.

He was chair of the Working Group on Early Maps of the International Geographical Union from 1961. He was also a member of the Académie Internationale d'Histoire des Sciences and of various other societies concerned with history, geography, archaeology, bibliography and archives.

During a sabbatical leave in 1962–63, he served as consultant and Acting Map Curator at Harvard University in the Widener Library.

His papers are held by the Centre for Newfoundland Studies Archives in the Memorial University of Newfoundland Library.

== Honours ==
Skelton was elected a Fellow of the Society of Antiquaries of London (FSA) in 1951. He was awarded the Gill Memorial of the Royal Geographical Society in 1957 and its Victoria Medal in 1970.
