= Alice Garnett =

British geographer

- Born: 15 May 1903; Wandsworth
- Died: 5 March 1989 (aged 85); Poole
- Education: University College, London
- Occupation: Geographer
- Employer: University of Sheffield
- Spouse: Colin A Crow

Alice Garnett or Alice Crow (15 May 1903 – 5 March 1989) was a British geographer at Sheffield University. She was the second British woman to become a professor of geography and she was vice-president of the Royal Geographical Society. She was the first woman president of the Institute of British Geographers and a winner of the Murchison Award.

== Life ==
Garnett was born in Wandsworth. She obtained a degree in geography at University College, London and joined the staff of Sheffield University in 1924 as assistant to the academic and explorer Robert Rudmose Brown. It was her task to teach and this enabled the university to add Geography to its range of subjects. In 1927 the university began an honours course.

In 1937 she gained a doctorate. In 1942 she became involved in naval intelligence work preparing two volumes on the geography of Yugoslavia. In 1945 David Linton took over as the head of the Geography department. In 1948 she became the second wife of a steelworks manager named Colin Arthur Crow, but she continued to be known as Alice Garnett.

Garnett was the first woman president of the Institute of British Geographers in 1966 and a winner of the Murchison Award.

Garnett's contribution was eventually recognised with a DSc and a chair at Sheffield University. Her 1958 appointment made her only the second woman to be a British professor of geography. In 1969 she became the vice-president of the Royal Geographical Society.

== Death and legacy ==
Garnett died a widow in Poole in 1989. Sheffield University give an annual Alice Garnett prize for the "best performance in Geography by a student reading for a dual honours degree".

== Works ==
- The Geographical Interpretation of Topographical Maps, 1930
- Insolation and Relief: their Bearing on the Human Geography of the Alpine Regions, 1937
