= Map Collectors' Circle =

- Formation: 1963
- Dissolved: 1975
- Type: NGO
- Headquarters: Durrant House, Chiswell Street, London EC1
- Official language: English
- Website: Index to The Map Collectors' Circle Series

The Map Collectors' Circle was founded in London in April 1963 by Ronald Vere Tooley with a stated aim of "stimulating interest in and publish material on early printed maps, atlases, cartographers, etc." Between 1963 and 1975, it set about fulfilling its second mandate with a series of 110 monographs related to the field of historical cartography which remain of interest to cartographers for their breadth. An index to the series has been created by the Bodleian Library Map Section.

== Map Collectors' Series ==
Volume 1, 1963-4

- 1. Geographical Oddities / R. V. Tooley.
- 2. Maps of Antarctica [t.p.: Early Antarctica] / R. V. Tooley.
- 3. The Isles of Scilly / Margaret Palmer.
- 4. Adams’ and Pine's maps of the Spanish Armada / D. Schrire.
- 5. The printed maps of Tasmania / R. V. Tooley.
- 6. Early maps and view of the Cape of Good Hope / R. V. Tooley.
- 7. Leo Belgicus: an illustrated list [t.p.: An illustrated list of variants] / R. V. Tooley.
- 8. California as an island / R. V. Tooley.
- 9. County atlases of the British Isles, 1579-1850. Part I [1579-1612] / R. A. Skelton.
- 10. Some early printed maps of Trinidad and Tobago.

Volume 2, 1964-5

- 11. Maps of the Falkland Islands [t.p.: Falkland Islands] / Angela Fordham.
- 12. One hundred foreign maps of Australia, 1773-1887.
- 13. Maps of Wales and Welsh cartographers / Olwen Caradoc Evans.
- 14. County atlases of the British Isles 1579-1850. Part 2: 1612-1646 / R. A. Skelton.
- 15. Ancient maps and explorers' routes on stamps / Capt M. F. Stern.
- 16. A dictionary of mapmakers. Part I: A-Callan / R. V. Tooley.
- 17. The Cape of Good Hope 1782-1842 / D. Schrire.
- 18. Maps of the Yorktown campaign / Prof. Coolie Verner.
- 19. The printed maps of Bermuda / Margaret Palmer.
- 20. North American city plans.

Volume 3, 1965-6

- 21. The printed maps of Barbados / Tony Campbell.
- 22. Town plans of the British Isles / Angela Fordham.
- 23. Early maps of Australia, The Dutch Period / R. V. Tooley.
- 24. New light on the Jansson-Visscher maps of New England / Tony Campbell.
- 25. The Malinowski Collection of maps of Poland. Part I / H. Malinowski.
- 26. The maps of South-West France.
- 27. Bickham’s birds eye county views and the British monarchy / D. Schrire.
- 28. A dictionary of mapmakers. Part II [Callan-Czoering] / R. V. Tooley.
- 29. Printed maps of Africa Part I, The continent of Africa, 1500-1600 / R. V. Tooley.
- 30. Printed maps of Africa Part II, Regional Maps / R. V. Tooley.

Volume 4, 1966-7

- 31. The Malinowski Collection of maps of Poland. Part II / H. Malinowski.
- 32. French explorers’ maps of New Zealand / R. P. Hargreaves.
- 33. French mapping of the Americas / R. V. Tooley.
- 34. Notes and Addenda.
- 35. Maps of Germany with marginal views [t.p.: with marginal town views]/ Prof. Dr. K. Stopp.
- 36. Japan: European printed maps to 1800 / Tony Campbell.
- 37. The marine surveys of James Cook in North America, 1758-1768 / R. A. Skelton and R. V. Tooley.
- 38. Ward maps of the city of London / Ralph Hyde.
- 39. Comparative cartography / Henry Stevens and Roland Tree.
- 40. A dictionary of mapmakers. Part III [D to Fatio] / R. V. Tooley.

Volume 5, 1967-8

- 41. County atlases of the British Isles 1579-1850. Part III: 1646-1670 / R. A. Skelton.
- 42. The printed maps of Jamaica up to 1825 / Capt. Kit S. Kapp.
- 43. The Malinowski Collection of maps of Poland. Part III / H. Malinowski.
- 44. The printed maps of New South Wales, 1773-1873 / R. V. Tooley.
- 45. Smith's Virginia and its derivatives / Prof. Coolie Verner
- 46. Claes Jansz Visscher: A hundred maps described / Tony Campbell.
- 47. Maps of Africa, a selection of printed maps from the sixteenth to the nineteenth century. Part 1 / R. V. Tooley.
- 48. Maps of Africa, a selection of printed maps from the sixteenth to the nineteenth century. Part 2 / R. V. Tooley.
- 49. County atlases of the British Isles 1579-1850. Part 4: 1671-1703 / R. A. Skelton.
- 50. A dictionary of mapmakers. Part IV: Fatout to Gutierrez / R. V. Tooley

Volume 6, 1970

- 51. Sir H. George Fordham, cartobibliographer / J. M. Henshall.
- 52. Decorative initial letters used in atlases / Alfred Bellaire.
- 53. Printed maps of Hertfordshire [t.p. adds: 1577-1900. Part I: 1577-1784] / D. Hodson.
- 54. Marine plans and charts of Wales / Olwen Caradoc Evans.
- 55. The Printed Maps Of Antigua, 1689-1899 / R. V. Tooley.
- 56. The Malinowski Collection of maps of Poland. Part IV / H. Malinowski.
- 57. The Malinowski Collection of maps of Poland. Part V / H. Malinowski.
- 58. Captain Collins' Coasting Pilot / Coolie Verner.
- 59. Printed maps of Hertfordshire Part II [t.p.: 1577-1900. Part 2: 1785-1820] / D. Hodson.
- 60. Printed maps of Australia [t.p. adds: Part I] / R. V. Tooley.

Volume 7, 1970-1

- 61. Printed maps of Southern Africa and its parts / R. V. Tooley.
- 62. Printed maps of Dominica and Grenada / R. V. Tooley
- 63. County atlases of the British Isles 1579-1850. Part 5: 1579-1703: appendices / R. A. Skelton.
- 64. Printed maps of Australia, Part II / R. V. Tooley.
- 65. Printed maps of Hertfordshire, Part III [t.p.: 1577-1900. Part 3: 1821-1860] / D. Hodson.
- 66. Printed maps of Australia, Part III [t.p. adds: F-H] / R. V. Tooley.
- 67. A dictionary of mapmakers. Part V: Gutierrez to Hutchinson / R. V. Tooley.
- 68. Printed maps of America, Part I / R. V. Tooley.
- 69. Printed maps of America, Part II / R. V. Tooley.
- 70. Printed charts of Scandinavia, Part I [t.p.: Printed sea charts of Scandinavia] / R. V. Tooley.

Volume 8, 1971

- 71. Printed charts of Scandinavia, Part II [t.p.: Printed sea charts of Scandinavia] / R. V. Tooley.
- 72. Printed maps of Australia. Part IV [t.p. adds: J-L] / R. V. Tooley.
- 73. The early maps of Panama up to 1865 / Capt. Kit S. Kapp.
- 74. Maps of the Canary Islands published before 1850 / C. Broekema.
- 75. Printed maps of Hertfordshire, Part IV [t.p.: 1577-1900. Part 4: 1861-1885] / D. Hodson.
- 76. Maps by John Arrowsmith [t.p. adds: in the publications of the Royal Geographical Society] / Coolie Verner.
- 77. The early maps of Colombia up to 1850 / Capt. Kit S. Kapp.
- 78. A dictionary of mapmakers. Part VI: Hutchinson to Kruse / R. V. Tooley.
- 79. Printed maps of Australia. Part V / R. V. Tooley.
- 80. Printed maps of America, Part III / R. V. Tooley.

Volume 9, 1972-1973

- 81. Printed maps of St. Kitts, St. Lucia and St. Vincent / R. V. Tooley.
- 82. A sequence of maps of Africa / R. V. Tooley.
- 83. Printed maps of Hertfordshire, Part V [t.p.: 1577-1900. Part 5: 18686-1900 and supplement / D. Hodson.
- 84. The Malinowski Collection of maps of Poland. Part VI / H. Malinowski.
- 85. Printed maps of Australia. Part VI [t.p. adds: S-Z] / R. V. Tooley.
- 86. The Malinowski Collection of maps of Poland. Part VII with index / H. Malinowski.
- 87. Playing Cards, depicting maps of the British Isles, and of English and Welsh counties / Sylvia Mann and David Kingsley.
- 88. Maps in the parliamentary papers by the Arrowsmiths. Part I. / Alexander McGechaen & Prof. Coolie Verner.
- 89. Maps in the parliamentary papers by the Arrowsmiths. Part II. / Alexander McGechaen & Prof. Coolie Verner.
- 90. Early printed maps of the British Isles 1477-1650. Part I: 1477-1555 / R. W. Shirley.

Volume 10, 1973-1974

- 91. A dictionary of mapmakers. Part VII: Krusenstern to Lutsch von Luchsenstein / R. V. Tooley.
- 92. A sequence of maps Of America / R. V. Tooley.
- 93. Printed maps of Australia. Part VII: Final Addenda / R. V. Tooley.
- 94. Early printed maps of the British Isles 1477-1650. Part II: 1556-1592 / R. W. Shirley.
- 95. Early printed maps of the British Isles 1477-1650. Part III: 1593-1610/ R. W. Shirley.
- 96. Printed maps of America, Part IV / R. V. Tooley.
- 97. Early printed maps of the British Isles 1477-1650. Part IV: 1611-1636/ R. W. Shirley.
- 98. A catalogue of printed maps of Greece and Greek regions 1477-1800. Part I / Christos G. Zacharakis.
- 99. A dictionary of mapmakers. Part VIII: Luttrell to Mills, J.B. / R. V. Tooley.
- 100. A dictionary of mapmakers. Part IX: Mills, J.E. to Oppolzer / R. V. Tooley.

Volume 11, 1974-1975

- 101. Early printed maps of the British Isles 1477-1650. Part V: 1637-1650, with appendices and index / R. V. Tooley.
- 102. A catalogue of printed maps of Greece and Greek regions 1477-1800. Part II / Christos G. Zacharakis.
- 103. Printed maps of Central America up to 1860. Part I: 1548-1760 / Capt. Kitt S. Kapp.
- 104. Some portraits of geographers and other persons associated with maps. [Part I] / R. V. Tooley.
- 105. Some portraits of geographers and other persons associated with maps. Final / R. V. Tooley.
- 106. Printed maps of Central America up to 1860. Part II: 1762-1860 / Capt. Kitt S. Kapp.
- 107. Title pages from 16th to 19th Century / R. V. Tooley.
- 108. Small and miniature maps of Africa [t.p.: Fifty small…] / Stephanie Hoppen.
- 109. South East Asia [t.p. adds: a selection of maps on Borneo, Burma, Cambodia, Malay, Thailand and Vietnam] / R. Rubens.
- 110. A dictionary of mapmakers. Part X: Orbigny to Powell, T.K. / R. V. Tooley.
