= Professor of Geography (Cambridge) =

British academic appointment

The Professorship of Geography (1931) at the University of Cambridge was founded in 1931, with the appointment of Frank Debenham, over forty years after the first lectureship had been established (in 1888), and twelve years after the Geography tripos had been established, in 1919.

== Professors of Geography (1931– ) ==
- Frank Debenham (1931–1949)
- James Alfred Steers (1949–1966)
- Clifford Darby (1966–1976)
- Michael Chisholm (1976–1996)
- Robert Bennett (1996–2010)
- Ash Amin (2011–2022)
- Sarah Hall (2023– )

== See also ==
- Department of Geography, University of Cambridge
