= George Robert Graham Conway =

English civil engineer & historian (1873-1951)

George Robert Graham Conway (1873–1951) was a civil engineer and a historian of Mexico. He is particularly known for his researches on Englishmen and the Mexican Inquisition (though the subjects were not all English).

== Biography ==
G. R. G. Conway was born in Southampton, and educated at Taunton's School and Hartley University College, both in Southampton. After completing his engineering training he worked as assistant to James Mansergh and then became Resident Engineer to the City of Aberdeen in 1895. He worked in Monterrey, Mexico from 1907–1910, in British Columbia, Canada, from 1910–1916, and in Mexico City from 1916 until he retired in 1942. He died in Mexico City on 20 May 1951.

== Engineering Work ==
In Aberdeen, Conway worked on the Girdleness Outfall Scheme, and on the rebuilding of the Union Bridge. In Monterrey he developed the Water-Works and Sewerage systems. In Canada, he worked on the Coquitlam-Buntzen hydro-electric scheme.

== Mexican History ==
Conway spent much of his spare time, and much of his own money, in researching the early colonial history of Mexico. He transcribed and translated great quantities of material from the Mexican archives, much of it relating to the inquisition. He was particularly interested in the fate of the English seamen captured by the Spanish and turned over to the inquisition, though individuals of other nationalities also figure in the records. He made gifts and bequests of his material to several libraries. James Williamson commented on the value of Conway's compilations of Hispanic material as complementing the English sources.

== Other interests ==
In 1923 Conway published a short book on the cartoonist Ernesto García Cabral "for the amusement of friends".

Conway became acquainted with D.H. Lawrence in Mexico City in 1925, and there is correspondences concerning Lawrences's novel The Plumed Serpent and his illness in Oaxaca.
