= Michael Chisholm (geographer) =

British geographer and academic (1931–2024)

Michael Chisholm FSA FBA
- Born: June 1931
- Died: 9 July 2024 (aged 93); Cambridge, England
- Education: St Catharine's College, Cambridge (B.A.)
- Scientific career
- Workplaces: Bedford College, London; University of Bristol; University of Cambridge

Michael Donald Inglis Chisholm FSA FBA (June 1931 – 9 July 2024) was a British economic and human geographer and academic. He was Professor of Geography at the University of Cambridge from 1976 until his retirement in 1996. He wrote several books on the rural economy and human geography, and served for many years as an advisor to the UK government.

== Biography ==
Chisholm was born in June 1931, and went to St Christopher School in Letchworth. He completed his schooling in 1950, and then undertook military service with the Royal Engineers. In 1951, he went to St Catharine's College, Cambridge, to study geography under Gus Caesar. Chisholm's contemporaries at St Catharine's included the geographers Peter Haggett, Peter Hall, Gerald Manners and Kenneth Warren. Together with Chisholm they formed a cohort of geographers who came to be known as "Caesar's Praetorian Guard". They later jointly wrote a Festschrift in Caesar's honour, edited by Chisholm. In the summer of 1953, Chisholm surveyed parts of Blakeney Point, Norfolk, to map changes in the coastline following the great North Sea flood of 31 January to 1 February 1953. Chisholm graduated in 1954.

== Career ==
After graduation, Chisholm first worked with Colin Clark at the Agricultural Economics Research Institute in the University of Oxford, from 1954 to 1959. In 1960, Chisholm took up an assistant lectureship at Bedford College, London, under Gordon Manley, before moving in 1965 to the University of Bristol. In Bristol, he was promoted to Reader in 1966, and to Professor of Social and Economic Geography in 1972. In 1976, he moved to Cambridge to take up the 1931 Chair in Geography; a post he held until retirement in April 1996. Chisholm was elected a Fellow of St Catharine's College in 1976, and became an emeritus Fellow in 1996. He was elected a Fellow of the British Academy in 2002.

Chisholm's main work was in areas of human and economic geography, and its applications to government. His writings covered topics including land rent and agricultural economics, regional growth, and the interface between economics and geography. A retrospective commentary on his 1962 book Rural Settlement and Land Use described it as "a powerful rallying point ... for a new kind of rural geography", in particular in its analysis of the importance of relative location in land use studies. In 1970, Chisholm was awarded the Gill Memorial Award of the Royal Geographical Society, in recognition of his work on rural settlement, land-use and economic geography. In retirement, Chisholm continued to publish papers, mainly on topics related to the history of the Cambridgeshire Fens. He died in Cambridge on 9 July 2024, at the age of 93.

== Professional service ==
Chisholm served on many national committees throughout his career. He was a member of the social science research council between 1967 and 1972, a member of the Local Government Boundary Commission for England between 1971 and 1978, of the Rural Development Commission from 1981 to 1990, and of the Local Government Commission for England between 1992 and 1995. He was president of the Institute of British Geographers in 1979. Chisholm was also a Conservator of the River Cam for many years, as member from 1979 and chair from 1991. He was also a trustee of the Cambridge Preservation Society and secretary of the Spalding Gentlemen's Society.

== Publications ==
=== Selected books ===
- Chisholm, Michael (2000). Structural Reform of British Local Government: Rhetoric and Reality. Manchester University Press. ISBN 0-7190-5771-X.
- Chisholm, Michael (1995). Britain on the Edge of Europe. London: Routledge. ISBN 0-415-11920-0.
- Chisholm, Michael (1975). Human Geography: Evolution or Revolution?. Harmondsworth: Penguin. ISBN 0-14-021883-1.
- Chisholm, Michael (1962). Rural Settlement and Land Use: An Essay in Location. London: Hutchinson. ISBN 0-09-139770-7.

=== Selected articles ===
- Chisholm, M. (2003). "Conservators of the River Cam, 1702–2002". Proceedings, Cambridge Antiquarian Society, 92, 183–200.
- Chisholm, M. & Stickler, P. (2012). "William Hayward's 1604 map of the Fens". Proceedings, Cambridge Antiquarian Society 101, 161–172.
