= Ministry of Town and Country Planning =

The Ministry of Town and Country Planning was a ministry established in 1943 by the Churchill war ministry, the government of the United Kingdom at the time. Its remit covered England and Wales. It was established to secure "consistency and continuity in the framing and execution of a national policy with respect to the use and development of land throughout England and Wales". The first minister was William Morrison, previously the Postmaster General.

== Maps Office ==
The ministry had a Maps Office established under the leadership of Christie Willatts. Willatts had previously worked for the Land Use Survey of Britain (LUS) before taking up the role of Research Maps Officer at the Ministry of Works and Buildings. However, when the new Ministry was founded he became Head of the Maps Office, while still contributing to the LUS. He and his team provided significant support toJames Alfred Steers in preparing a report on the coastline of England and Wales for the Ministry.

== Ministers of Town and Country Planning ==
Portrait	Name (Birth–Death)	Term of office		Party	Ministry
	William Morrison; MP for Cirencester and Tewkesbury (1893–1961)	7 November 1943	4 August 1945	Conservative	Churchill War (All parties)
	Lewis Silkin; MP for Peckham (1897–1969)	4 August 1945	28 February 1950	Labour	Attlee I
	Hugh Dalton; MP for Bishop Auckland (1897–1969)	28 February 1950	January 1951	Labour	Attlee II

== Dissolution in 1951 ==
In 1951 the ministry was combined with certain functions of the Ministry of Health to create the Ministry of Local Government and Planning. However following the defeat of the Labour Party in the 1951 United Kingdom general election the third Churchill ministry renamed the body the Ministry of Housing and Local Government.

== See also ==
- Town and country planning in the United Kingdom
