= Monica Cole =

English geographer (1922–1994)

- Born: Monica Mary Cole; 5 May 1922; Clapham Common, London, England
- Died: 8 January 1994 (aged 71); Sutton, Surrey, England
- Citizenship: British
- Education: Bedford College, London; University of London
- Awards: Murchison Award (1987)
- Scientific career
- Fields: Geography
- Workplaces: University of Cape Town (1947–1948); University of the Witwatersrand (1948–1951); Keele University (1951–1964); Bedford College, London (1964–1987)
- Thesis: The Economic Geography of Building Materials (1947)

Monica Mary Cole (5 May 1922 – 8 January 1994) was an English geographer and lecturer. She was appointed geography lecturer at the University of Cape Town in 1947 before joining the staff of the University of the Witwatersrand's Department of Geography the following year. Cole became a senior lecturer at Keele University in 1951 and was appointed Chair of Geography at her alma mater Bedford College, London in 1964. She resigned her position in 1975 and was made Director of Research in Geobotany, Terrain Analysis, and Related Resource Use, which she held until her retirement in 1987. Cole was awarded the Royal Geographical Society's Murchison Award in 1987. Following her death, the society established a research travel grant in her name, from funding left to it by her.

== Early life ==
Cole was born to the bank clerk William Henry Parnall Cole and his wife Dorothy Mary Thomas on 5 May 1922, in Clapham Common, London. She was the oldest daughter in the family and attended Wimbledon County Grammar School from 1934 to 1940. Cole excelled in sports and was recognised as a polyglot. Between 1940 and 1943, she attended Bedford College, London as an undergraduate and completed a first class Bachelor of Science degree in geography, with geology as a subsidiary course. Cole worked as a research assistant for the Ministry of Town and Country Planning from 1944 to 1945, while she completed a Doctor of Philosophy degree in 1947 at the University of London with a thesis on The Economic Geography of Building Materials.

== Career ==
In 1947, she was appointed geography lecturer under Bill Talbot at the University of Cape Town. It was common at the time for academic geographers of her generation to have their first appointments overseas. Cole conducted a detailed land utilisation survey on the soils and crop yield affected by climate anomalies in Elgin, Western Cape, which was called "one of the most thorough and useful land utilization surveys carried out anywhere in South Africa" by Stanley Jackson in The Geographical Journal. By the time she joined the staff of the Department of Geography at the University of the Witwatersrand, Johannesburg in 1948 she had become highly interested in African savannas, particularly the constraints of land-use choice from environmental constraints and management. Her interest in vegetation anomalies of the Highveld and Lowveld and researching the possibility of utilising plants as indicators received encouragement and support from the mining industry, although some senior geologists were at first uncomfortable with a woman in their field.

With the expansion of red brick universities, Cole returned to Britain to take up a senior lectureship at Keele University, Staffordshire in 1951, and was a visiting professor at the University of Idaho in 1952. She continued to be interested in research overseas and frequently went to Australia, South Africa and South America. As a research scholar of the Government of Brazil, in 1956, Cole conducted extensive surveying of the country's cerrado, caatinga, and pantanal savanna vegetation origin and distribution and drew focus on how to address the change of climate and geomorphological evolution. She went on a sponsored visit to Australia in 1960 to work on a new worldwide nomenclature classification for savanna vegetation based on its character. Cole undertook a major research product in the area of Dugald River in north-western Queensland and later in Bulman to identify copper, lead and zinc mineralization in indicator plants. She then studied vegetation over basic and ultra rocks in Western Australia and gave attention to Hybanthus floribundus as a nickel indicator. Cole's book, South Africa, was published in 1961.

In 1964, she was appointed Chair of Geography at her alma mater, Bedford College. Over the next decade, Cole strove to expand biogeographical research facilities and to make her alma mater and successor Royal Holloway, University of London the UK's leading biogeography university centre. The publication of her book Land Use Studies in the Transvaal Lowveld in 1965, led her to conduct further work on copper prospecting in Botswana and Namibia. She identified the Helichrypsum Leptolepis herb as a copper indicator and helped to trace its copper-reading beds. Cole investigated Southern Rhodesia's Empress nickel–copper deposit, indicating the importance of studying plant sampling in a savanna woodland environment, and worked in North Finland in the 1970s. She tested air photograph value in a tropical forest environment in Bougainville Island in the Solomon Islands, and studied Landsat 1 ground truth imagery of Northwestern Queensland's savannas in 1971. In 1972, Cole landscaped trunk roads as a member of the Department of Transport Advisory Committee.

Unrest within Bedford College led her to resign as Chair of Geography in 1975 and become Director of Research in Geobotany, Terrain Analysis, and Related Resource Use. Cole was part of a 1979 NASA project to estimate possible data uses from the Heat Capacity Mapping Mission for geological mapping. Her final book, The Savannas: Biogeography and Geobotany, was published in 1986. She began working as a principal investigator for Spot Image in the same year. Cole retired from the Royal Holloway, University of London in 1987 but continued as a Leverhulme Research Fellow and was appointed Emeritus Professor at Royal Holloway. From 1990 to 1991 she conduced her final project in which geobotany and remote sensing were employed to locate copper, lead and zinc deposits close to Charters Towers, Queensland. Cole was a contributor to B. A. Robert's and J. Proctor's 1992 book Ecology of Areas with Serpentinized Rocks.

In 1963, she was made president of the South African Geographical Society. She was presented with the Royal Geographical Society's Murchison Award in 1987 "for major contributions to the geography of South Africa and to the understanding of savannas." Cole was elected as a member of the Geographical Club three years later, and received an honorary life membership of the South African Geographical Society in 1993. During the final years of her life, Cole painted watercolour portraits, some of which were exhibited just before her death.

== Personal life ==
She died of cancer on 8 January 1994, in the Royal Marsden Hospital, Sutton, Surrey. Cole did not marry. Following a service at St Mary's Church, Wimbledon on 25 January, her remains were cremated.

== Legacy ==
Rob Potter and Pauline Catt called Cole "a leader in her chosen field of academic research" and that she "scaled the heights of a profession that, even today, finds too few women as the incumbents of chairs." She left the Royal Geographical Society £10,000 for it to establish a research travel grant for young female physical geographists. The grant was established in 1995 and the recipient receives £1,000 to aid in their studies overseas. The Archives of the Royal Holloway, University of London holds a collection of papers relating to Cole. They include her personal papers and objects connected to her career as a geographer between 1967 and 1970.
