= Ronald Vere Tooley =

British antiquarian

Cover of "The Map Collector"

Ronald Vere Tooley (29 September 1898 – 12 October 1986) was an English map dealer, an authority on early maps and cartographers, a noted compiler of catalogues on maps, cartography and antiquarian books, author of Maps and Map-makers, and founder of the Map Collectors' Circle which published a series of monographs on historical cartography in the period 1963–1975. He is considered the founder of the antiquarian map trade.

Tooley was born on Michaelmas and adopted the nickname "Mick".

== Career ==
Tooley was born and raised in Islington, London, and educated at the City of London School. Towards the end of World War I he enlisted in the Queen's Westminster Rifles. After his basic training he left for France and took part in the Battle of Cambrai, where he was one of 120 survivors from an initial force of 400 men. On being demobilised in 1919 and having no definite career plans, he came across an illustrated catalogue of antiquarian books, published by James Tregaskis of Great Russell Street. The idea of working in the bookselling field appealed to him, and armed with a letter of introduction he made the acquaintance of Francis Edwards Ltd., and was summarily employed.

After World War I the book trade enjoyed a time of relative prosperity, but with the Wall Street collapse in 1929, economic depression hit the commercial sector in many countries, the secondhand book trade being no exception. In the 1930s Tooley left Francis Edwards Ltd and opened The Atlas Bookshop, just off Charing Cross Road, and started dealing almost exclusively in antiquarian maps. Between 1932 and 1934 he collaborated with a Mr M. Sinelnikoff of Orion Booksellers Ltd. Sinelnikoff's passion was old maps, charts and globes, and with Tooley's interest, a fertile conjunction of scholarly minds was created. Tooley had always been interested in Colour Plate books, and in 1935 Batsford published his first book on the subject Some English Books with Coloured Plates. When The Atlas Bookshop closed in 1936 Tooley started work at the Parker Gallery in Albemarle Street – the firm specialising in military and sporting prints as well as old maps. With the outbreak of World War II in 1939 Tooley found work as a telephone operator, but still worked with old books and maps in his spare time.

In 1946 the management of Francis Edwards Ltd, keenly aware of Tooley's considerable business expertise and knowledge of old maps, invited him to rejoin the firm. Here he continued his research, spending long hours in the Map Room of the British Museum. His talents soon led to his being appointed a director of the firm. In 1949 his second book Maps & Map-makers was published, praised as a sound introduction and guide to a complex field, and running to many editions. Tooley retired from Francis Edwards Ltd in 1975 and in 1979 joined Peter Scott and Peter Kalms in setting up a new company R.V.Tooley Ltd, he was joined by his stepson Douglas Adams and in October 1979 his stepson Stephen Luck joined them, first trading at Tring, Hertfordshire and then in the Spring of 1980 33 Museum Street, this company closed in 1982 and became Tooley Adams & Co. Together they developed the firm into one of the leading antique map dealers, supplying maps to dealers, museums and libraries all over the world.

"The Map Collector's Series" is widely regarded as the greatest of Tooley's achievements. The idea of producing a series of monographs on maps was first discussed in 1960 with Robert Stockwell. The interest generated by this idea was widespread and led to The Map Collector's Circle being formed in April 1963 under Tooley and David Schrire. The series was acclaimed throughout the world, and seen as an important contribution to cartography. It also led to the founding of the Carta Press, aimed at publishing authoritative works on cartography. The first publication, in 1968, was Maps of the African Continent and Southern Africa, and was followed in 1970 by County Atlases of the British Isles by R.A. Skelton of the Map Room of the British Museum. The Map Collector magazine was started by Tooley in 1977 when the Map Collector's Circle ceased publishing. Each issue of The Map Collector consisted of articles and information provided by respected authorities, collectors and dealers.

== Appreciation ==
In his 75th year Tooley was elected a Fellow of the Royal Scottish Geographical Society. The festschrift My Head is a Map was compiled in 1973 for his 75th birthday by Helen Wallis and Sarah Tyacke, both Map Librarians from the British Library and celebrated his contributions to the world of antiquarian maps.

== Selected books ==
- Some English Books with Coloured Plates (Batsford – 1935)
- Maps in Italian Atlases of the 16th Century (Imago Mundi, 3 (1939). 12–47)
- Maps and Map-makers (Batsford – 1961)
- Dictionary of Mapmakers
- A History of Cartography (Thames & Hudson, London – 1969)
- The Mapping of America
- The Mapping of Australia
- English Books with Coloured Plates 1790 to 1860 (Barnes & Noble – 1973)
