= Eugene Bernard =

English footballer

Personal information
- Full name: Eugene Henri Georges Bernard
- Date of birth: 3 June 1914
- Place of birth: Southampton, England
- Date of death: 31 August 1973 (aged 59)
- Place of death: Southampton, England
- Height: 5 ft 10 in (1.78 m)
- Position: Goalkeeper

Senior career*
Years	Team	Apps	(Gls)
1933–1942	Southampton	2	(0)
- Winchester City
- Ryde Sports
- * Club domestic league appearances and goals

Eugene Henri Georges Bernard (3 June 1914 – 31 August 1973) was an English amateur footballer who made two first-team appearances as a goalkeeper for Southampton in 1936.

== Football career ==
Bernard was born in Southampton and educated at Taunton's School. He joined Southampton as an amateur in November 1933, and made frequent reserve-team appearances. At the start of the 1936–37 season, both regular custodian Bert Scriven and new signing Len Stansbridge were unavailable, so Bernard was drafted into the first team for matches at home to Chesterfield (won 3–2) and away to Doncaster Rovers (lost 2–0), before Scriven's return.

He remained on the club's books as a player until 1942, making nine first-team appearances in wartime matches, before a serious hand injury brought his playing career to an end.

== Coaching career ==
In 1946, he was appointed coach to Southampton's youth players, graduating to reserve team coach in 1952.

He later worked in the insurance business.
