= Christie Willatts =

English cartographer and planner

Christie Willatts (OBE) (1908–2000) was an English cartographer and planner who had a long career in the Civil Service. He played a major role as Organising Secretary of the Land Use Survey of Britain as well as heading the Maps Office, at the Ministry of Town and Country Planning.

When James Alfred Steers embarked on the report on the coastline of England and Wales for the Ministry, he thanked Willetts and his staff for the help they had afforded him. He subsequently worked as a Principal Planner in the Local Government and Development wing of the Department of the Environment, until his retirement in 1973. In 1971, shortly before his retirement he delivered the E. G. R. Taylor Memorial Lecture of the Royal Geographical Society.

== Published articles ==
- E. C. Willatts (1946) "Some Geographical Factors in the Palestine Problem" The Geographical Journal, Vol. 108, No. 4/6 (Oct. - Dec., 1946), pp. 146–173 (32 pages)
- J. R. James, Sheila F. Scott, E. C. Willatts (1961) "Land Use and the Changing Power Industry in England and Wales", The Geographical Journal, Vol. 127, No. 3 (Sep., 1961), pp. 286–309
- E. C. Willatts (1971) "Planning and Geography in the Last Three Decades" The Geographical Journal, Sep., 1971, Vol. 137, No. 3 (Sep., 1971), pp. 311–330
