= Shiba P. Chatterjee =

Indian academic and geographer (1903–1989)

Shiba Prasad Chatterjee (22 February 1903 – 27 February 1989) was a Professor of Geography at the University of Calcutta, India. He served as President of the International Geographical Union from 1964 until 1968, Chatterjee received a Murchison Award from the Royal Geographical Society in 1959, and a Padma Bhushan from the Government of India in 1985. He coined the name 'Meghalaya' for one of India's states.

== Bibliography ==
- Chatterjee, S.P. (15 August 1965). "Chapter 1: Physiography". The Gazetteer of India, The Indian Union. Volume One: Country and People. Nasik, India: Government of India Press. pp. 1–65.
- Chatterjee, S.P. (1983). Junior College Geography. Stosius Inc/Advent Books Division. ISBN 978-0-86131-090-6.

== Sources ==
- Mookerjee, S. (1998): Shiba P. Chatterjee, 1903–1989. Geographers: biobibliographical studies 18.
- "S P Chatterjee Memorial Series". Indian National Cartographic Association. Archived from the original on 20 October 2011.
