= James Alfred Steers =

James Alfred Steers (1899–1987) was a prominent coastal geomorphologist who was Professor of Geography at the University of Cambridge from 1949 to 1966.

Steers was one of the first students to complete the Geographical Tripos introduced in 1919. He spent a year teaching at Framlingham College but returned to Cambridge in 1922.

== Coastal Preservation and Planning ==
In 1943 Steers was commissioned to prepare a report on the coastline of England and Wales by the newly formed Ministry of Town and Country Planning. Over a period of eighteen months he visited 2751 miles of coastline, working with Dr E. C. 'Christie' Willatts, Head of the Maps Office for that ministry. In June 1944 he delivered an account of his research to a meeting of the Royal Geographical Society. He discussed a widely recognised expectation of an increase in the number of visitors to the coast. Thanks to the "holidays-with-pay" schemes, this would included access to the coastline by many people previously unable to make such visits. He predicted an increase of buildings offering expanded facilities to cope with the larger number of visitors.

== Published works ==
- The Suffolk Shore: Yarmouth to Aldeburgh Proceedings of the Suffolk Institute of Archaeology and History, Volume XIX, part 1 (1925)
- Suffolk Coast: Orfordness Proceedings of the Suffolk Institute of Archaeology and History, Volume XIX, part 2 (1926)
- The Sea Coast. London, Collins, 1953. (New Naturalist series no.25 1st edition, 1953. ISBN 978-1114479869)
