= Ash Amin =

British Indian academic

- Born: 31 October 1955 (age 70)
- Awards: Fellow of the British Academy (2007); Honorary doctorate from the University of Uppsala (2014)

Ash Amin, CBE, FBA, FAcSS (born 31 October 1955) is a British academic known for his writing on urban and regional development, contemporary cultural change, progressive politics, and the collaborative economy. He holds the 1931 chair at the Department of Geography, University of Cambridge. Amin has held two residential fellowships (Spring 1999, Spring 2011) at the Swedish Collegium for Advanced Study in Uppsala, Sweden. He is currently Chair of the Academic Senate at the same institute. Since September 2015 he has held the post of foreign secretary of the British Academy.

== Early life ==
Amin was born in Kampala, Uganda. and lived in the South Asian community of Kenya until the age of 16, when he emigrated with his family to settle in Britain. He finished his schooling at Stratford Grammar School in London. He graduated from the University of Reading in 1979 with a degree in Italian Studies and then gained a PhD in geography from Reading in 1986.

== Career ==
He is a geographer, interested in the geographies of contemporary social, political and economic change and their effects on situated life, autonomy and identity. His research has been based mainly in Europe, but is increasingly focusing on informal settlements in the developing world. His career started at Newcastle University in 1982. He was a Research Fellow and Research Associate at the Centre for Urban and Regional Development Studies and also a Lecturer and later a professor in the Department of Geography. In 1995 he left Newcastle for Durham University, where he was head of the geography department and the founding executive director of the Institute of Advanced Study. In 2011 was appointed as 1931 Chair in Geography at University of Cambridge and became a professorial Fellow of Christ's College.

== Books ==
- Amin, A. and Thrift, N. 2016. Seeing Like a City. Cambridge: Polity Press.
- Amin, A. and Thrift, N., 2013. Arts of the Political: New Openings for the Left, Duke University Press
- Amin, A., 2012. Land of Strangers, Polity Press. v. 20, p. 1–8. http://doi.org/10.1080/1070289X.2012.732544
- Amin, A. and O'Neill, M. (eds.), 2009. Thinking About Almost Everything, Profile Books
- Amin, A. (ed.), 2009. The Social Economy, Zed Books
- Amin, A. and Roberts, J. (eds.), 2008. Community, Economic Creativity, and Organization, Oxford University Press. 324pp. doi:10.1093/acprof:oso/9780199545490.001.0001
- Amin, A. and Thrift, N. (eds.), 2004. The Blackwell Cultural Economy Reader, Blackwell
- Amin, A. and Cohendet, P., 2004. Architectures of Knowledge, Oxford University Press. p. 1–194. doi:10.1093/acprof:oso/9780199253326.001.0001
- Amin, A., Massey, D.B. and Thrift, N.J., 2003. Decentering the Nation A Radical Approach to Regional Inequality, Compas. 45pp
- Amin, A., Cameron, A. and Hudson, R., 2002. Placing the Social Economy, Routledge. 147pp
- Amin, A. and Thrift, N., 2002. Cities: Re-imagining the Urban, Polity Press
- Amin, A., Massey, D.B. and Thrift, N.J., 2000. Cities for the Many Not the Few, Policy Press. 48pp
- Amin, A. (ed.), 1997. Beyond Market and Hierarchy Interactive Governance and Social Complexity, Edward Elgar Pub. 327pp
- Amin, A. (ed.), 1995. Post-Fordism A Reader, Wiley-Blackwell. 448pp
- Amin, A. (ed.), 1995. Behind the Myth of European Union Prospects for Cohesion, Routledge. 334pp
- Amin, A. and Thrift, N. (eds.), 1994. Globalisation, Institutions and Regional Development in Europe, Oxford University Press
- Amin, A. (ed.), 1991. Towards a New Europe? Structural Change in the European Economy, Edward Elgar Pub. 241pp
- Amin, A. and Goddard, J.B. (eds.), 1986. Technological Change, Industrial Restructuring and Regional Development, Allen & Unwin

== Awards and fellowships ==
Amin has held fellowships and visiting professorships at a number of universities, including the University of Venice, the University of Naples, University of Copenhagen, Erasmus University Rotterdam, Columbia University, the Federal University of Minas Gerais, Queen Mary College, London, and the University of Uppsala. He has been held positions on the ESRC Research Priorities Board, the Race Advisory Board of the Joseph Rowntree Foundation, the Council of the European Association of Evolutionary Political Economy, the Pro-Futura Programme of the Swedish Collegium of Advanced Study, the Advanced Grants Panel of the European Research Council, and the Strategic Research Projects Board of the University of Padova.

He has received various awards and membership to prestigious bodies such as:

- Life Corresponding member of the Italian Institute of Geographers
- Fellow of the World Academy of Art and Science
- Royal Geographical Society's Edward Heath Prize in 1998
- Academician of the Academy of Learned Societies for the Social Sciences
- Fellow of the British Academy

He was appointed Commander of the Order of the British Empire (CBE) in the 2014 New Year Honours for services to social science., and on 30 January 2015 he was awarded an honorary Doctorate from the Faculty of Social Sciences at Uppsala University.
