= Joseph Wiggins =

English explorer

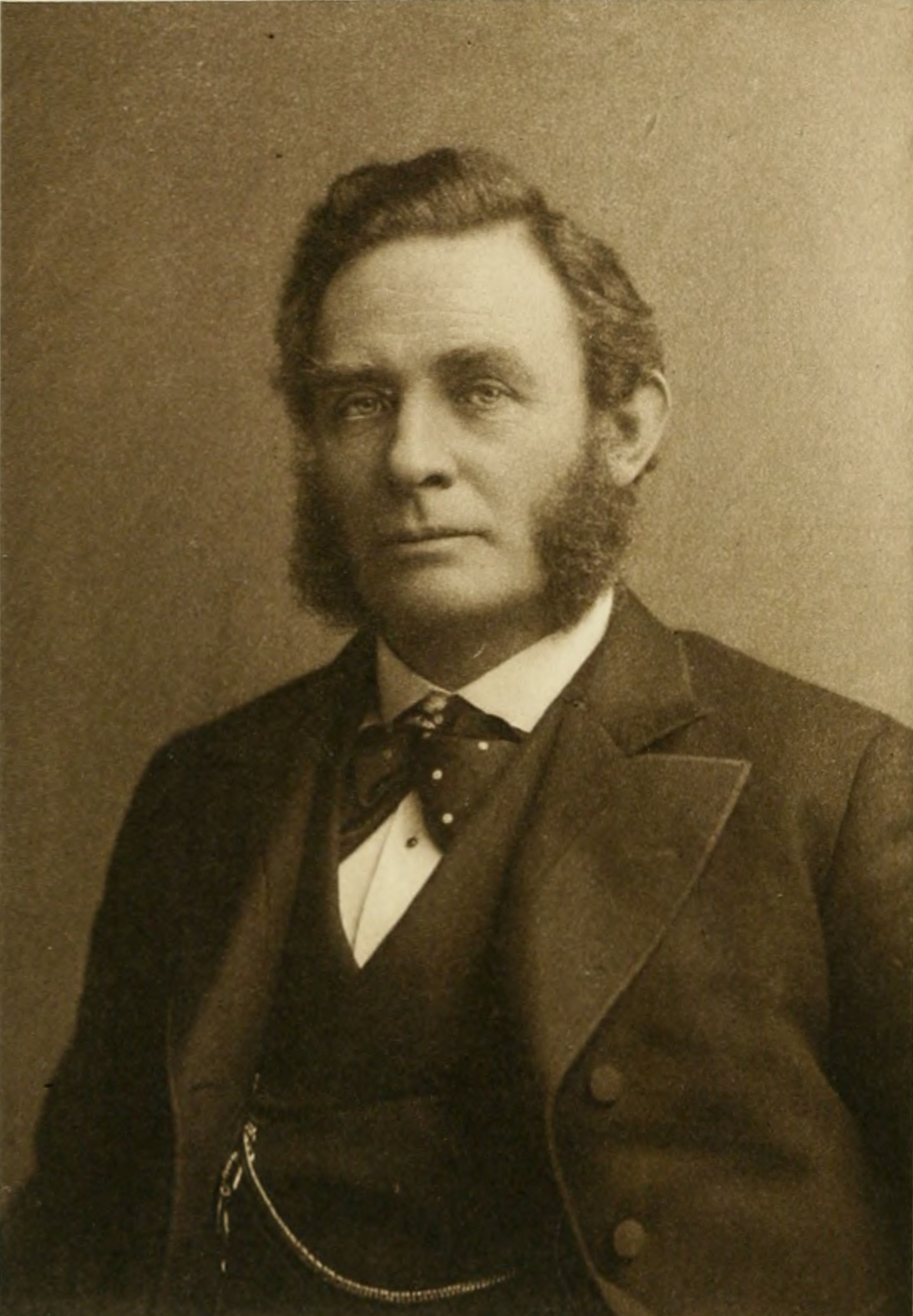
Joseph Wiggins

Joseph Wiggins FRGS (3 September 1832 – 13 September 1905) was an English mariner, born at Norwich into a family of mailcoach operators.

He rounded out a successful career as a sea captain by utilizing a portion of the northern sea route to Siberia. He was the pioneer in demonstrating the practicability of trade relations by sea between the North Sea countries and the northern portion of Siberia. Beginning his voyages in 1874, he twice reached the Ob River, and five times carried cargoes to the Yenisei River, up which stream he once navigated his ship 2000 miles (3218 km). He facilitated the construction of the Trans-Siberian railway by carrying to that country a large cargo of rails.

He was honored by the Czar for his pioneer work, which Baron Nordenskiöld described as an "Event rivaling in importance the return of the first fleet loaded with merchandise from India". In 1894 he was awarded the Murchison Award by the Royal Geographical Society.

In 2016, it was reported that the wreck of the steamship Thames, with which Wiggins had made an expedition to the Yenisei River in 1876 and which sank there in 1878, had been discovered.
