= Helen Wallis =

Helen Margaret Wallis OBE
- Born: 17 August 1924; Chipping Barnet, London
- Died: 7 February 1995 (aged 70); St John's Wood, London
- Education: St Hugh's College, Oxford
- Occupations: Librarian, historian
- Employer: British Museum
- Awards: Caird Medal; Victoria Medal

Helen Margaret Wallis OBE (17 August 1924 – 7 February 1995) was the Map Curator at the British Museum (afterwards the British Library) from 1967 to 1987.

== Biography ==
Born at Dunkery, Park Road, Barnet on 17 August 1924, Wallis was the daughter of Leonard Francis Wallis (1880–1965), headmaster, and Mary McCulloch Jones (1884–1957), teacher. She attended St Paul's Girls' School (1934–43) and studied geography at St Hugh's College, Oxford (1945–1954), where she completed her D.Phil. degree in 1954 with a thesis 'The exploration of the South Sea, 1519 to 1644'.

In 1951, she was appointed assistant to R.A. Skelton, superintendent of the Map Room at the British Museum, succeeding him in 1967. She was the first woman to hold the post. In 1968 she was responsible for the acquisition of the map collection of the Royal United Services Institution. She also discovered the earliest version of England's first globe, by Emery Molyneux and thought to date from 1592, at Petworth House.

She was the chairman of the standing commission on the history of cartography of the International Cartographic Association. In 1986, she became president of the International Map Collectors' Society and she was a founder of The Geography and Map Section of the International Federation of Library Associations. She served as President of The Society for Nautical Research, 1972–1988, and President of the British Cartographic Society. She was appointed OBE in the 1986 Birthday Honours.

Key publications include Carteret's voyage round the world, 1766–1769, Cartographical innovations, and the Historians' guide to early British maps.

She retired from the British Library in 1986, then died of cancer on 7 February 1995 at the Hospital of St John and St Elizabeth in St John's Wood, London. An obituary written by W.R. Mead appeared in The Independent, 14 February 1995. Another obituary was published in the IFLA Journal.

== Honours and awards ==
- Order of the British Empire, 1986
- Hon. D.Litt. Davidson College, North Carolina
- Honorary Fellow of Portsmouth Polytechnic
- Society Medal of the British Cartographic Society
- Caird Medal of the National Maritime Museum
- Victoria Medal of the Royal Geographical Society
- Honorary Fellow of the International Cartographic Association
- Honorary Fellow of the Library Association
- Fellow of the Society of Antiquaries of London.
