= Derek Tulk =

English cricketer (1934–2023)

Personal information
- Full name: Derek Thomas Tulk
- Born: 21 April 1934; Southampton, Hampshire, England
- Died: 27 January 2023 (aged 88); Rownhams, Hampshire, England
- Batting: Right-handed
- Bowling: Right-arm medium

Domestic team information
- Years: Team
- 1956–1957: Hampshire

Career statistics
Competition	First-class
Matches	2
Runs scored	8
Batting average	–
100s/50s	0/0
Top score	8*
Balls bowled	96
Wickets	0
Bowling average	–
5 wickets in innings	–
10 wickets in match	–
Best bowling	–
Catches/stumpings	1/–
- Source: Cricinfo, 7 January 2010

Derek Thomas Tulk (21 April 1934 – 27 January 2023) was an English first-class cricketer.

Tulk was born at Southampton in April 1934. He was educated at Taunton's School, where he played for the school cricket team in the Hampshire Schools' Altham Trophy. He made two appearances in first-class cricket for Hampshire, playing against Gloucestershire in the 1956 County Championship, and Cambridge University in 1957. Playing as a right-arm medium pace bowler, he bowled a total of 16 overs across both matches, but failed to take a wicket. After his brief foray into first-class cricket, Tulk played club cricket for the Old Tauntonians Cricket Club, playing a prominent role in the club's success in the Southern Cricket League during the 1970s. Outside of cricket, he forged a successful career in the insurance industry. Tulk died in Rownhams, Hampshire on 27 January 2023, at the age of 88. He had been unwell for some time. His son, Ian, worked for Hampshire County Cricket Club for over 20 years.
