= Leo Bagrow =

Russian historian of cartography

Leo Bagrow (born Lev Semenovich Bagrov; 6 July 1881 – 10 August 1957) was a Russian-born historian of cartography, founder of the journal Imago Mundi. He grew up in Russia, and initially pursued a career within the Imperial Russian Navy. In naval service, he traveled extensively to conduct surveying work. During this time, he encountered the historical map collection of Arctic explorer Adolf Erik Nordenskiöld in Helsinki and became interested in the history of mapmaking.

Following the outbreak of World War I, he taught navigation and what may have been the world's first academic course on the history of geodesy and cartography in Saint Petersburg. By this time he had also begun publishing scholarly articles and receiving international recognition within his field. Following the Russian Revolution, he fled the country, never to return. He settled in Berlin, where he began working as a dealer in antique maps. There he met Hans Wertheim, with whom he founded the world's first international scholarly journal dedicated to the history of cartography, Imago Mundi. The first issue was published in 1935; Wertheim, who was Jewish, was soon forced to flee Nazi Germany to Belgium, where he died.

Bagrow managed to find a new publisher for the journal in London, but stayed in Germany until April 1945, when he was evacuated with the help of Swedish colleagues with the last diplomatic flight from Berlin to Stockholm. He would spend the rest of his life in Sweden, where he was granted citizenship in 1952 and where he enjoyed the patronage of King Gustav VI Adolf.

== Early life in Russia ==
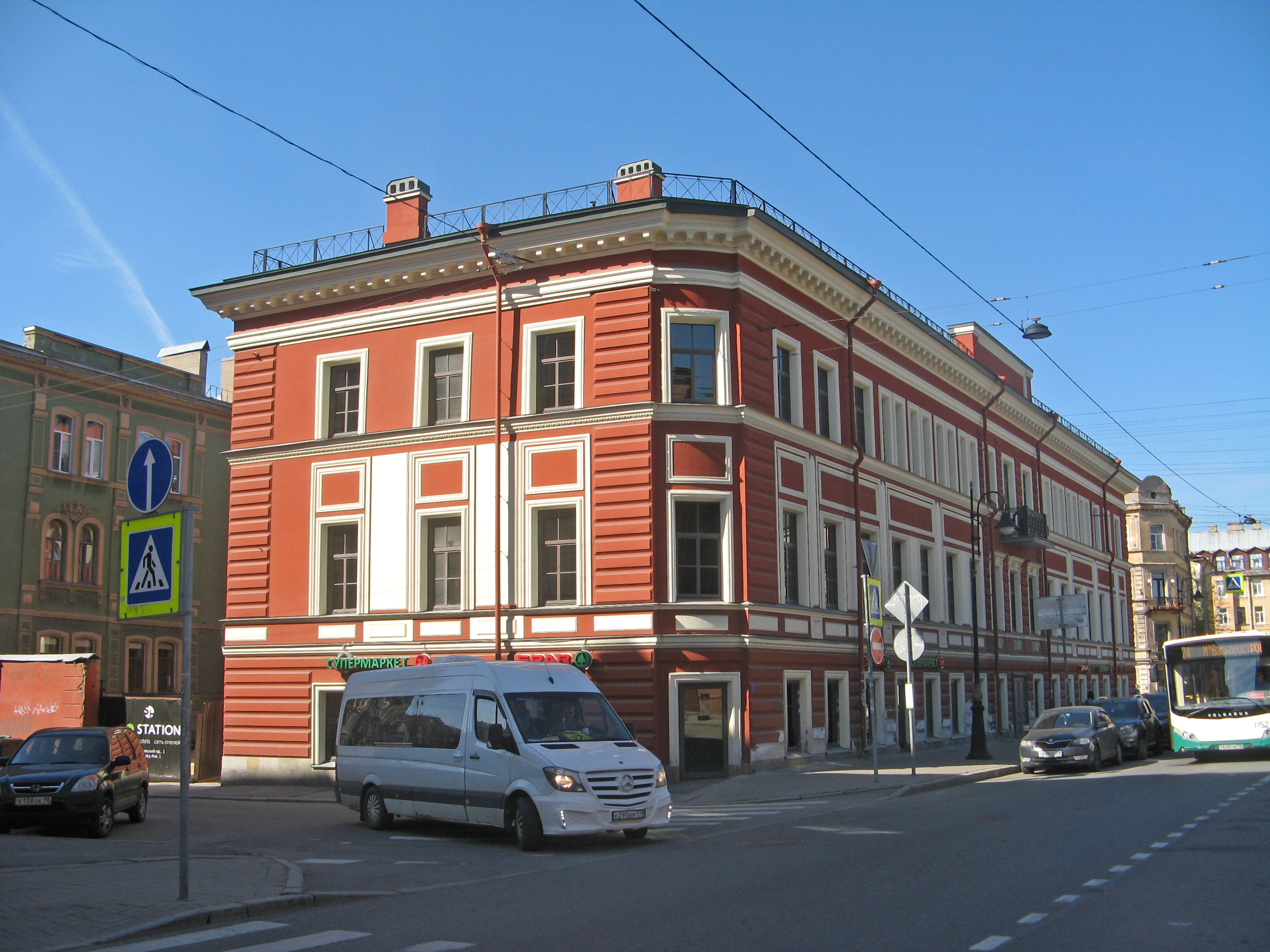
The Gurevich gymnasium in Saint Petersburg, where Bagrow went to school. Among his schoolmates and friends was Igor Stravinsky.

Leo Bagrow was born in the settlement of Vereteye, close to Solikamsk in the Russian Empire. His father was an engineer, working on the railway. His mother died when he was still an infant. After having attended school in Tambov for the first years of his life, he was enrolled in the prestigious private Gurevich gymnasium in Saint Petersburg in 1899. Among the schoolmates with whom he became friends was the future composer Igor Stravinsky; Bagrow himself had a keen interest in music throughout his life.

He graduated from school in 1902 and then enrolled as a cadet in the Imperial Russian Navy. In the same year he began academic studies at Saint Petersburg State University in geography, and later Bagrow also pursued studies at the Imperial Archaeological Institute. His university studies were cut short by the outbreak of the Russo-Japanese War in 1904 and by the subsequent Russian Revolution of 1905. He left the university for the Navy in 1905, and worked in the Naval Ministry's Hydrographical Office 1906–1908 and again 1912–1914. In 1909 he married Olga Ladan.

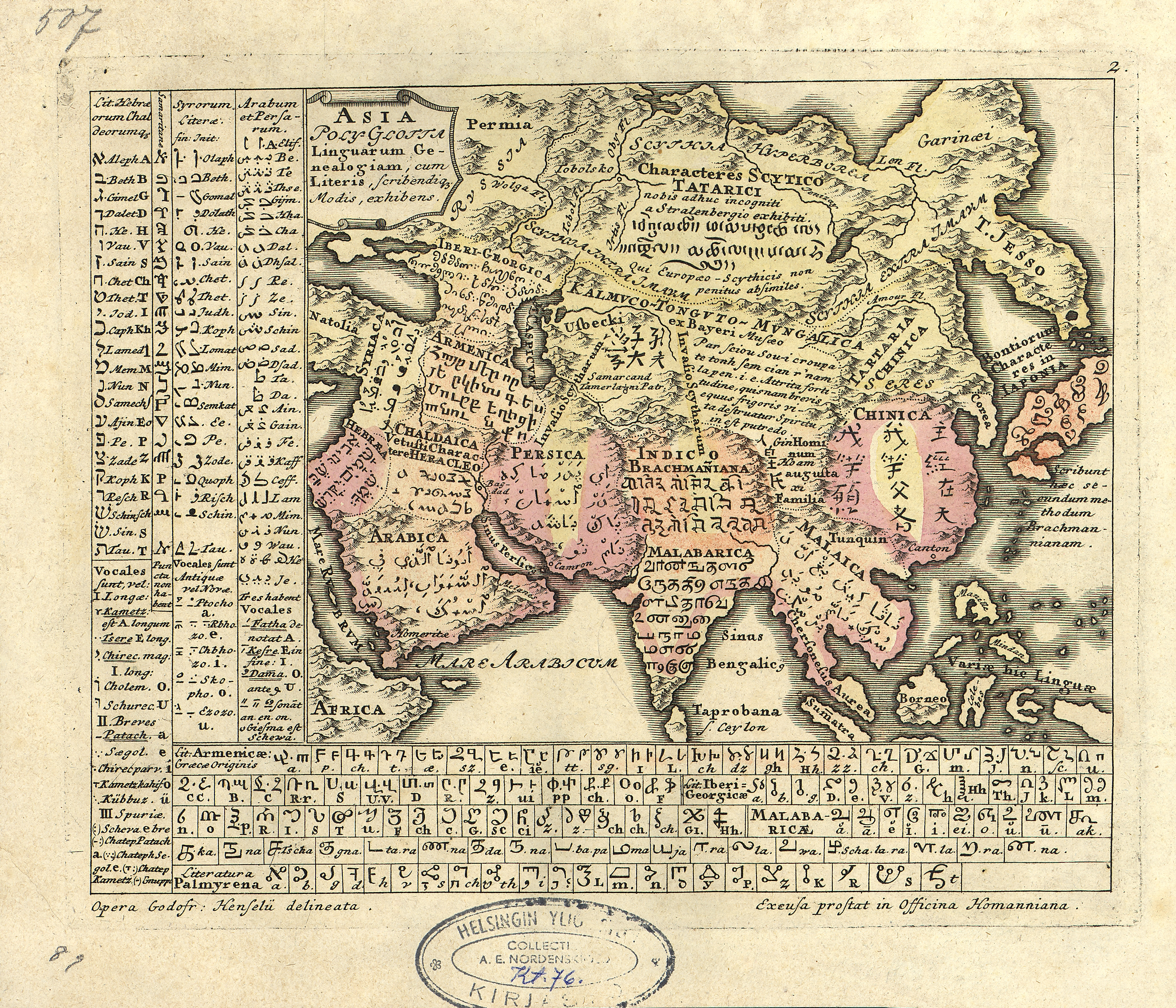
Map of Asia from 1741 by Gottfried Hensel, from the historical map collection of Adolf Erik Nordenskiöld in Helsinki. Bagrow referred to Nordenskiöld as his "master"; his interest in the history of cartography was spurred after encountering the collection.

During his years at the Hydrographical Office he travelled extensively. He went on surveying trips to the Caspian Sea, the Gulf of Finland, the Kara Sea, the lower Amur and Kamchatka. He also went abroad: twice to Japan, and also to Korea, China, present-day Thailand and Myanmar. While working in the Gulf of Finland, he had the opportunity to study the collection of historical maps of explorer Adolf Erik Nordenskiöld, kept in the library of Helsinki University (today the National Library of Finland). The encounter with Nordenskiöld's collection spurred his own interest in the history of cartography, and he regarded the explorer as his "master", dedicating publications to him in 1917 and 1950. During his travels he also took up the habit of seeking out and purchasing historical maps of the regions he visited, and it appears that it was during these years his life-long passion for the history of cartography was born. He published his first scholarly publication in 1912.

Following the outbreak of World War I, Bagrow was promoted to the rank of Captain and returned to Saint Petersburg in 1916 where he taught navigation at the Technical School. He was also appointed professor in geography and history and supposedly taught a course on the history of geodesy and cartography at the Geographical Institute with his colleague, Dimitry Rudnev. Though unconfirmed, this would make it the first known academic course on the history of cartography worldwide. Towards the end of the war, Bagrow had already published extensively in Russian on the history of mapmaking, and received his first international recognition following a work on the Theatrum Orbis Terrarum by Abraham Ortelius.

== Exile in Germany ==
Bagrow, who came from a wealthy family within the establishment of the Russian tsarist regime, was an avowed anti-Bolshevik. Following the Russian Revolution, he and Olga fled Russia in November 1918. They left behind most of their possessions, including Leo Bagrow's sizeable library and map collection. The couple settled in Berlin, in the area of Charlottenburg. Leo Bagrow never returned to Russia.

In Berlin, he sustained himself by dealing in antiques, including maps and books. He used his Russian origins to his benefits, acting as a broker for the sale of art and objects confiscated from the Russian Orthodox Church and Russian nobility by Soviet authorities, which were controversially sold abroad to raise cash for the new Soviet regime. He was at one time associated with the industrialist Hugo Stinnes, and purchased historical maps and atlases on his behalf. He also published in a Russian émigré magazine and in 1927 founded a "Circle of Lovers of Russian Antiquities", which came to include, among others, the poet Raisa Blokh and art historian Alexej A. Hackel. During his years in Berlin he also had the opportunity to travel internationally to search for cartographical material. He also began rebuilding a personal collection of maps and related items, and pursuing his particular interest in the history of cartography in Russia and adjacent lands. He also wrote a general history of mapmaking, and initiated a series of monographs on early maps.

== Founding of Imago Mundi ==
Map of present-day southern Russia and Ukraine from 1699, by Jacob Bruce and Yury Mengden. Bagrow dedicated an article in Imago Mundi in 1955 to this map, of which he himself owned a copy. His particular interest throughout life was the history of cartography of Russia and adjacent lands.

Around 1930, Bagrow formed a friendship with Hans Wertheim. Wertheim was also a dealer in maps and atlases, and head of the art book publishing company Der Bibliographikon. The idea of founding a periodical dedicated to the history of cartography was born in conversations between Bagrow and Wertheim in the early 1930s. Through Wertheim's publishing company, the first issue of Imago Mundi was then published in the summer of 1935. In doing so, Bagrow and Wertheim created the first international, scholarly journal dedicated to the history of cartography in the world.

By 1935 political repression in what was by then Nazi Germany was prevalent enough to make further publishing of Imago Mundi impossible. Hans Wertheim was Jewish, and German academics, "either through fear or ideological conviction", would not publish in a journal co-edited by a Jew. Soon after the first issue was printed, Wertheim left Germany for good to settle in Belgium, where he died shortly afterwards. Bagrow managed to find a new publisher in London (though for several years the publication of the journal was erratic), but he himself kept on living in Berlin.

== Later life in Sweden ==
During World War II, Bagrow continued his engagement in the history of cartography. Among other things he visited an exhibition organised in Paris during the German occupation. Though Bagrow appears to have been politically inactive, his decision to stay in Berlin throughout the war complicated his relationship with some colleagues after the war. His identity as a White Russian, anti-Bolshevik émigré in Nazi Germany, his "prickly" demeanour, his willingness to engage also politically controversial contributors for the journal, and occasional dubious business deals cast a certain pall over some relations. There is, however, no evidence that he actively collaborated with the Nazi regime.

In February 1945 a friend of Bagrow, Swedish archaeologist Ture Johnsson Arne, together with the head of the map section of the National Library of Sweden, Josef Haglund, engaged themselves in extracting Bagrow from war-torn Berlin to neutral Sweden. On 24 April, they organised for Leo and Olga Bagrow (and their pet sparrow) to escape on the last diplomatic flight from Berlin to Stockholm, less than a week before the suicide of Adolf Hitler. The dramatic escape was related in Swedish press; the Red Army was at the time only six to seven kilometres from Tempelhof Airport. For the second time in his life, Bagrow was forced to abandon the majority of his personal collection of historical maps, though he brought some with him on the plane and some had been conveyed for safekeeping to the Swedish embassy.

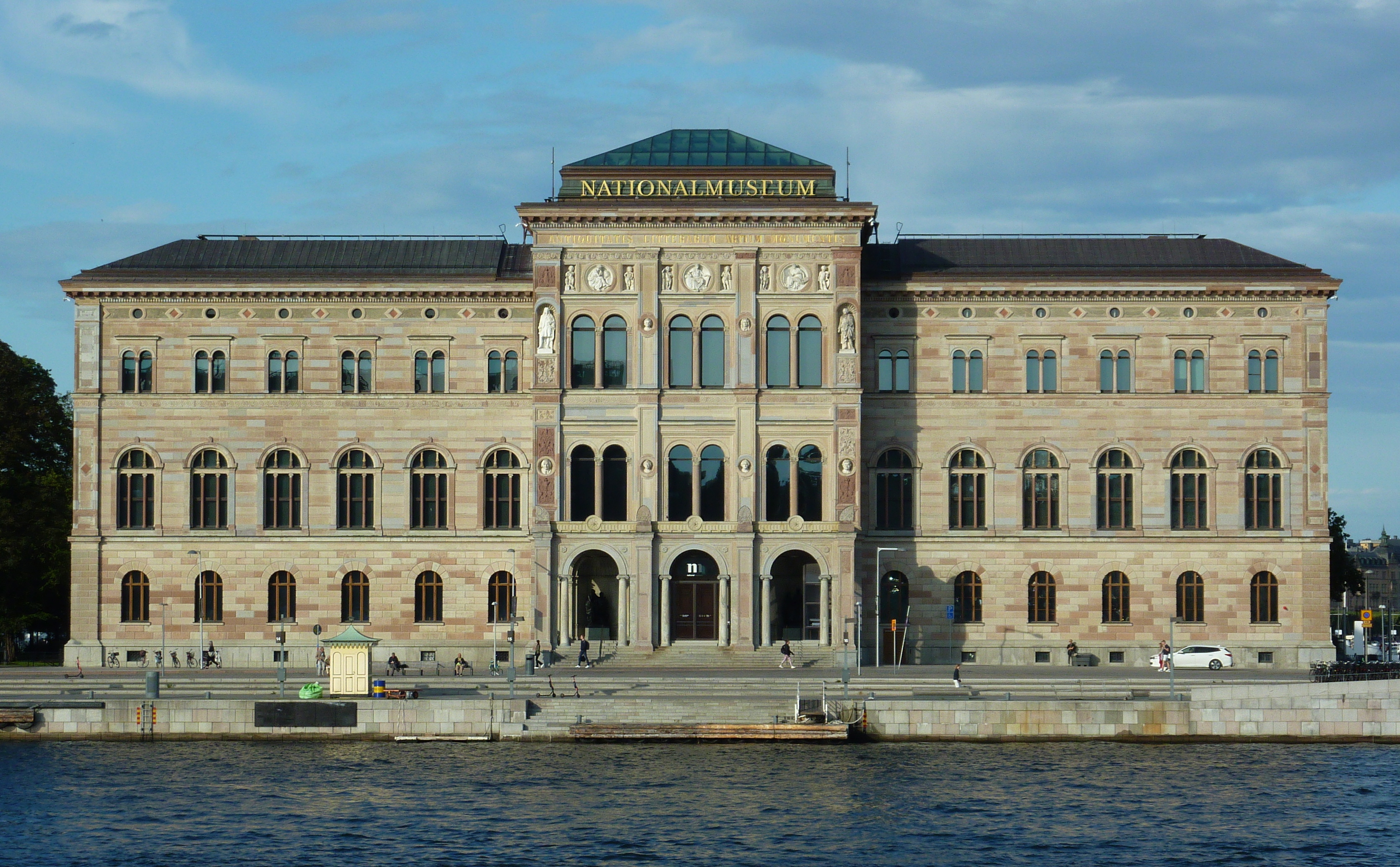
Nationalmuseum in Stockholm. Thanks to an exhibition there in 1947, Bagrow could solicit the patronage of King Gustaf VI Adolf.

Once safely arrived in Sweden, efforts were made by his Swedish colleagues to try to secure a position for Bagrow in the United Kingdom or the United States, but without success. Instead, he came to stay in Sweden. Haglund and Arne mobilised Swedish support for Bagrow. Arne appears to have promoted the idea that Bagrow could co-organise an exhibition of historical maps at Nationalmuseum. This idea came to fruition in February 1947. Haglund convinced the Crown Prince of Sweden, soon thereafter King Gustaf VI Adolf, to support Bagrow by a regular state pension after the Crown Prince attended the exhibition. The Crown Prince also helped secure funding from an endowment fund so that the publication of Imago Mundi could be resumed in Stockholm. Bagrow himself wrote in 1956 that the journal "owes its present appearance exclusively to the patronage of His Majesty". In 1952, Bagrow was granted Swedish citizenship, after having been stateless for 34 years.

Ten volumes of Imago Mundi were published in Sweden, after which E. J. Brill in Leiden in the Netherlands took over the task of publishing the journal. In 1956 publishing again passed to Mouton & Company in The Hague. During the 1950s, Bagrow also negotiated with several institutions about the sale of his own collection. It was sold in 1956 to the Houghton Library of Harvard University. Bagrow however continued residing and working in Sweden. After the war he also made several long journeys to continue his research, including to Istanbul and Ethiopia. He died in 1957 during a visit to his publisher in The Hague.

== Sources cited ==
- Bäärenhielm, Göran (2008). Kartografiska sällskapets jubileumsskrift [Jubilee publication of the cartographic society] (PDF) (in Swedish). Kartografiska sällskapet. pp. 61–77.
- Crone, G. R. (1957). "Obituary: Leo Bagrow". The Geographical Journal. 123 (4): 575–576. JSTOR 1790413.
- Heffernan, Michael; Delano–Smith, Catherine (2014). "A Life in Maps: Leo Bagrow, "Imago Mundi", and the History of Cartography in the Early Twentieth Century". Imago Mundi. 66: 44–69. doi:10.1080/03085694.2014.947850. JSTOR 24269958. S2CID 130061908.
- Kish, George (1958). "Obituary: Leo Bagrow". Geographical Review. 48 (3): 445. JSTOR 212264.
- Loewenson, Leo (1958). "Leo Bagrow (1880–1957)". The Slavonic and East European Review. 36 (87): 517–5718. JSTOR 4204970.
- Monmonier, Mark, ed. (2015). The History of Cartography. Volume Six. Cartography in the Twentieth Century. University of Chicago Press. ISBN 978-0-226-15212-7.
- "Leo Bagrow: Historian of Cartography and Founder of Imago Mundi, 1881-1957". Imago Mundi. 14: 4–5+7–12. 1959. JSTOR 1150208.
