= Alfred Augustus Levi Caesar =

English geographer (1914–1995)

Alfred Augustus Levi Caesar (1914–1995), also known as Gus Caesar, was an English geographer noted particularly as a teacher. He spent most of his life based in St Catharine's College, Cambridge.

== Life and career ==
Caesar was born in Southampton, and educated at Taunton's College, at that time a grammar school in that town. He studied geography at St Catharine's College, Cambridge, gaining a double first. He was elected to a postgraduate scholarship in 1936. He then taught for a year at the University of Durham (Newcastle).

Chart of the North Pacific, issued for the use of lifeboats from 1942

During World War II he was seconded to the Admiralty, working as a cartographer in Bath. In 1942 he came up with the idea of providing charts for ships' lifeboats. These were small scale charts covering the worlds' oceans, and showing prevailing currents and winds, to help the crew of a sunken ship to find their way to safety. These were issued to merchant ships. Caesar later received letters from mariners whose lives had been saved by these charts.

After the war, Caesar spent his career almost entirely in Cambridge, teaching economic geography, with particular reference to the Soviet Union and Eastern Europe. He became successively Dean, Tutor, Senior Tutor and President of St. Catharine's College, as well as serving on numerous University committees. He published little, but was noted for the quality of his teaching, particularly his tutorial supervisions. St. Catharine's along with St. John's, had been a pioneer in the introduction of open scholarships (those not restricted to applicants from specific schools) in geography, and this had led to a great influx of talent. In 1980, some 80 of his former pupils were in University positions in geography. One who recalled the "logical and linear" fashion of Caesar's teaching was Sir Peter Hall. Gus Caesar and his wife, Margaret, were also remembered for the hospitality extended from their house on Granchester Meadows.

In 1971 a number of his former students published a volume in celebration of Caesar's life and work, entitled Spatial Policy Problems of the British Economy. Caesar died in 1995 after a number of years of failing health.

== Bibliography ==
- Caesar, A.A.L. (1954). North-East England. G. Philip. OCLC 30197128.
- —— (1955). "On the Economic Organization of Eastern Europe". The Geographical Journal. 121 (4): 451–465. Bibcode:1955GeogJ.121..451C. doi:10.2307/1791754. JSTOR 1791754.
- —— (1962). "Yugoslavia: Geography and Post-War Planning". Transactions and Papers (Institute of British Geographers) (30): 33–43. doi:10.2307/621300. JSTOR 621300.
- —— (1964). "Planning and the Geography of Great Britain". Nature. 203 (4948): 950–951. doi:10.1038/203950b0.
- —— (1965). "The modern city: future trends". In Steers, James Alfred (ed.). The Cambridge Region. London: The British Association for the Advancement of Science. pp. 179–192.
