= Robert Bennett (geographer) =

British economic geographer (born 1948)

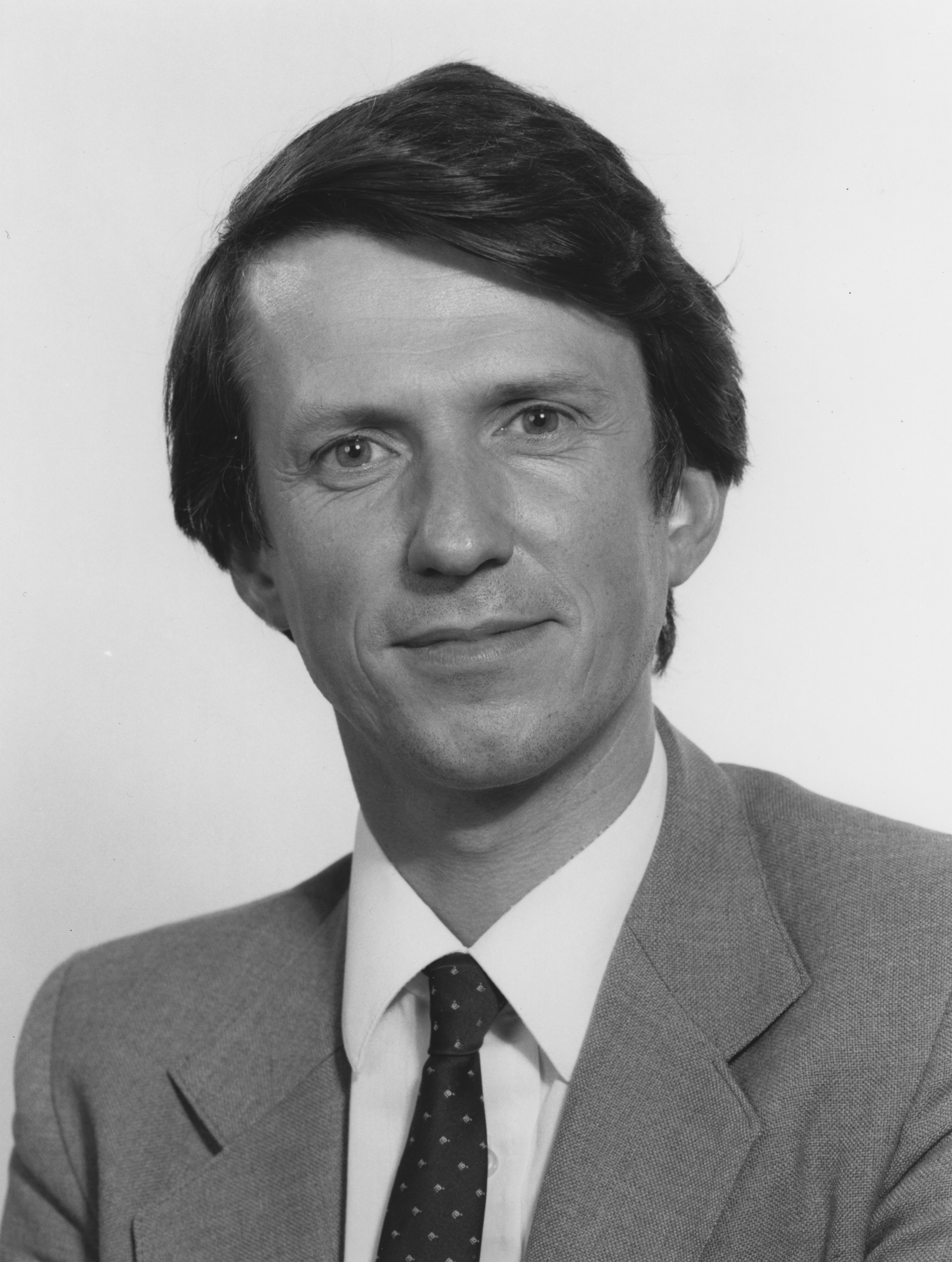
Robert J. Bennett, 1986

Robert John Bennett, FBA (born 1948) is a British geographer. He was Professor of Geography (1931) at the University of Cambridge and a fellow of St Catharine's College, Cambridge, from 1996 to 2010.

== Early life and education ==
Born in 1948, Bennett studied at the University of Cambridge, graduating with a BA in 1970 and then completing doctoral studies there; his PhD was awarded in 1975 for his thesis "Methods of Dynamic Modelling of Spatial Systems: The Case of North West England".

== Career ==
Bennett was a lecturer at University College London from 1973 to 1978, then a lecturer at the University of Cambridge from 1978 to 1985. He was appointed professor of geography at the London School of Economics in 1985, serving until 1996 when he moved to the University of Cambridge. There, he was Professor of Geography (1931) from 1996 to 2010, senior associate at the Judge Business School and (from 1996 to 2000) a Leverhulme research professor (from 1996 to 2000) and a fellow of St Catharine's College (from 1996 to 2010). Since retiring in 2011, he has been an emeritus professor of geography at Cambridge and an emeritus fellow at St Catharine's College, Cambridge.

Bennett was a visiting professor at the University of California, Berkeley in 1978, an international fellow at the University of Minnesota in 1985, and a university fellow in George Mason University in 1989. He was elected a fellow of the British Academy in 1991. He was general editor of the journal Government and Policy from 1982 to 2008 and co-editor from 2008 to 2016. He was also a recipient of the Royal Geographical Society's Founder's Medal in 1998.

== Publications ==
- Bennett, Robert J., and Richard J. Chorley, Environmental Systems: Philosophy, Analysis and Control (Methuen, 1978).
- Bennett, Robert J., Spatial Time Series: Analysis – Forecasting – Control (London: Pion, 1979).
- Bennett, Robert J., The Geography of Public Finance: Welfare under Fiscal Federalism and Local Government Finance (London: Methuen, 1980).
- Bennett, Robert J. (ed.), European Progress in Spatial Analysis (London: Pion, 1981)
- Wrigley, N., and R. J. Bennett (eds), Quantitative Geography: A British View (London: Routledge and Kegan Paul, 1981)
- Bennett, Robert J., Central Grants to Local Government: The Political and Economic Impact of the Rate Support Grant in England and Wales, Cambridge Geographical Studies, vol. 17 (Cambridge: Cambridge University Press, 1982).
- Bennett, Robert J., and K. C. Tan, Optimal Control of Spatial Systems, The London Research Series, vol. 6 (London: George Allen and Unwin, 1984).
- Bennett, Robert J., Intergovernmental Financial Relations in Austria (Canberra: Australian National University, 1985)
- Bennett, Robert J., and A. G. Wilson, Mathematical Methods in Human Geography and Planning, Guidebook No. 7, Handbook of Applicable Mathematics (Chichester: John Wiley, 1985).
- Bennett, Robert J., and H. Zimmermann (eds), Local Business Taxes in Britain and Germany (Baden-Baden: Nomos Verlagsgesellschaft, 1986).
- Bennett, Robert J., and Günter Krebs, Local Business Taxes in Britain and Germany (Baden-Baden: Nomos Verlagsgesellschaft, 1988);
- Bennett, Robert J., Territory and Administration in Europe (London: Pinter, 1989).
- Bennett, Robert J., Decentralization, Local Governments and Markets: Towards a Post-Welfare Agenda (Oxford: Clarendon Press, 1990).
- Bennett, Robert J., and R. C. Estall, Global Change and Challenge: Geography for the 1990s (London: Routledge, 1991).
- Bennett, Robert J., and Günter Krebs, Local Economic Development: Public-Private Initiatives in Britain and Germany (London: Belhaven, 1991).
- Bennett, Robert J., and Andrew McCoshan, Enterprise and Human Resource Development: Local Capacity Building (London: Paul Chapman, 1993).
- Bennett, Robert J., Local Government in the New Europe (London: Belhaven Press, 1993).
- Bennett, Robert J., Local Government and Market Decentralization: Experiences in Industrialized, Developing, and Former Eastern Bloc Countries (Tokyo: United Nations University Press, 1994).
- Bennett, Robert J.; Wicks, Peter; McCoshan, Andrew, Local Empowerment and Business Services: Britain's Experiment Training and Enterprise Councils (London: UCL Press, 1994).
- Bennett, Robert J., and Diane Payne, Local and Regional Economic Development: Renegotiating Power under Labour (Aldershot: Ashgate, 2000).
- Bennett, Robert J., Central Grants to Local Governments: The Political and Economic Impact of the Rate Support Grant in England and Wales (Cambridge: Cambridge University Press, 2009).
- Bennett, Robert J., Local Business Voice: The History of Chambers of Commerce in Britain, Ireland, and revolutionary America, 1760–2011 (Oxford: Oxford University Press, 2011).
- Bennett, Robert J., Entrepreneurship, Small Business and Public Policy: Evolution and Revolution (Abingdon: Routledge, 2014).
- Bennett, Robert J. (ed.), Documents of the First Chambers of Commerce in Britain and Ireland, 1767–1839 (Oxford: Oxford University Press for the British Academy, 2018).
- Bennett, Robert J.; Smith, Harry; Van Lieshout, Carry; Montebruno, Piero; and Newton, Gill, The Age of Entrepreneurship: Business Proprietors, Self-Employment and Corporations since 1851 (Abingdon: Routledge, 2019).
