= Edmund William Gilbert =

British social geographer

Edmund William Gilbert (1900–1973) was a British social geographer. He was professor of geography at the University of Oxford, from 1953 to 1967. and Fellow of Hertford College, Oxford. He defined geography in terms of the recognition of the characters of regions.

In the 1920s, while at Reading University, he studied the American West. He was much influenced by Halford Mackinder, to the point of being thought an uncritical admirer.

During World War II he worked on the Naval Intelligence Handbooks, producing, with Robert Beckinsale and S. da Sá, the Spain and Portugal volumes.

He studied at St Peter's School, York.

== Works ==
- The Exploration of Western America, 1800-1850: An Historical Geography (1933)
- Brighton Old Ocean's Bauble (1953)
- The University Town in England and West Germany (1961)
- British Pioneers in Geography (1972)
