= John Frederick Unstead =

John Frederick Unstead (1876, London – 28 November 1965) was an English geographer. In 1905 he was appointed as a Lecturer to teach Geography at the new teacher training college, Goldsmiths' College. He was amongst the first teacher trainers at the College and received a salary of £200. He also worked as an assistant to A. J. Herbertson, Professor of Geography at Oxford University with his vacation classes.

He was appointed professor of geography at Birkbeck College in 1920. When he stood down in 1930, the post was taken over by his colleague Eva Germaine Taylor.

== Articles and books ==
- 1949 "H. J. Mackinder and the New Geography" The Geographical Journal, Vol. 113 (Jan. - Jun., 1949), pp. 47-57
