= Clifford Darby =

Welsh geographer and academic

Sir Henry Clifford Darby CBE FBA (7 February 1909 – 14 April 1992), commonly known as Sir Clifford Darby, was a Welsh historical geographer and academic. He was a key figure in the establishment of historical geography as a subject in British academia, and occupied several chairs of geography.

== Career ==
Born in Resolven in South Wales on 7 February 1909, he was the son of an engineer and attended the Neath County School before going up to St Catharine's College, Cambridge, on a scholarship; after initially reading English, he switched to geography and graduated with firsts in parts one and two of the Tripos. He subsequently completed a PhD, the first to be awarded in geography at Cambridge; and, after a year as a university lecturer in geography, he took up a fellowship at King's College, Cambridge, where he remained until 1945. During the Second World War, Darby was also commissioned as an officer in the Intelligence Corps before taking charge of the Admiralty's Geographical Handbook Centre in 1941. In 1945, he was appointed John Rankin Professor of Geography at the University of Liverpool and in 1949 moved to University College London to be Professor of Geography. He returned to the University of Cambridge in 1966 as Professor of Geography (1931), retiring in 1976.

As one obituary noted, "Clifford Darby was a towering figure in British geography over a period straddling sixty years during the middle decades of [the 20th] century, and in the first rank of scholars in the country". He made his reputation in the study of historical geography, and made extensive use of the Domesday Book as a source. He served as President of the Institute of British Geographers (1961) and Chairman of the British National Committee for Geography (1973–78). He was elected a Fellow of the British Academy in 1967 (and was Vice-President in 1972–73) and an honorary Fellow of the Royal Geographical Society in 1975. As well as receiving a number of honorary doctorates and academic awards, he was appointed a Commander of the Order of the British Empire (CBE) in 1988 and knighted three years later. He died in 1992.
