= Imago Mundi =

- Discipline: History of cartography
- Language: English
- Edited by: Jordana Dym and Katherine Parker

Publication details
- History: 1935–present
- Publisher: Routledge
- Frequency: Biannually

Standard abbreviations
- ISO 4: Imago Mundi

Indexing
- ISSN: 0308-5694 (print); 1479-7801 (web)
- LCCN: 36022520
- OCLC no.: 612175130

Links
- Journal homepage; Online access; Online archive

Imago Mundi (/iˈmɑːɡoʊ ˈmuːndi/ ee-MAH-goh MOON-dee), or in full Imago Mundi: International Journal for the History of Cartography, is a semiannual peer-reviewed academic journal about mapping, established in 1935 by Leo Bagrow. The journal was published on a near-annual basis from 1935 to 2003 (with breaks in 1936, 1938, 1940–46, 1957–58, 1961, and 1973–74), but since 2004 has been published twice-yearly. It covers the history of early maps, cartography, and map-related ideas. Articles are in English and have abstracts in French, German, Spanish, and English. Each volume also contains three reference sections (book reviews, bibliography, and chronicle) that provide a summary of current developments in the field.

It was published originally by Imago Mundi Ltd. with ISSN 1479-7801 (electronic), 0308-5694 (paper).
