= Royal Geographical Society =

British learned society

Coordinates: 51.5013°N 0.1754°W

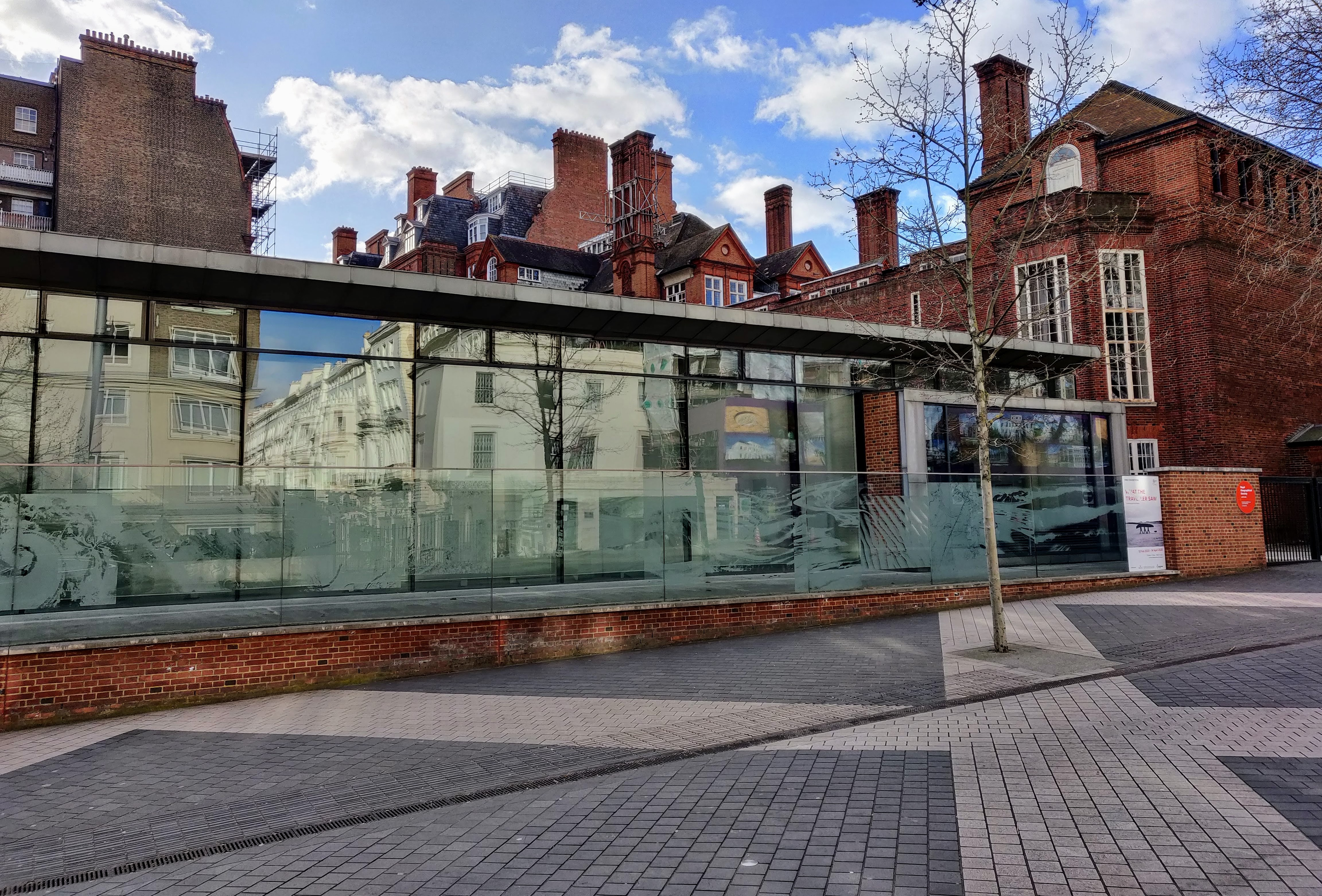
- Main entrance from the Exhibition Road extension, with the original Lowther Lodge to the right
- Abbreviation: RGS-IBG
- Formation: 1830; 196 years ago
- Type: Learned society
- Headquarters: 1 Kensington Gore, London
- Members: 16,500
- President: Dame Jane Francis
- Director: Joe Smith
- Patron: Anne, Princess Royal
- Website: www.rgs.org

The Royal Geographical Society (with the Institute of British Geographers), often shortened to RGS, is a learned society and professional body for geography based in the United Kingdom. Founded in 1830 for the advancement of geographical sciences, the society has 16,000 members, with its work reaching the public through publications, research groups and lectures.

The RGS was founded in 1830 under the name Geographical Society of London as an institution to promote the 'advancement of geographical science'. It later absorbed the older African Association, which had been founded by Sir Joseph Banks in 1788, as well as the Raleigh Club and the Palestine Association. In 1995 it merged with the Institute of British Geographers, a body for academic geographers, to become officially the Royal Geographical Society with IBG.

The society is governed by its council, which is chaired by the society's president, according to a set of statutes and standing orders. The members of council and the president are elected from and by its fellows, who are allowed to use the postnominal title FRGS. As a chartered body, the RGS holds the Register of Chartered Geographers in the public interest, a source of qualified, practising and experienced professional geographers. Fellows may apply for chartership if they fulfil the criteria.

== History ==
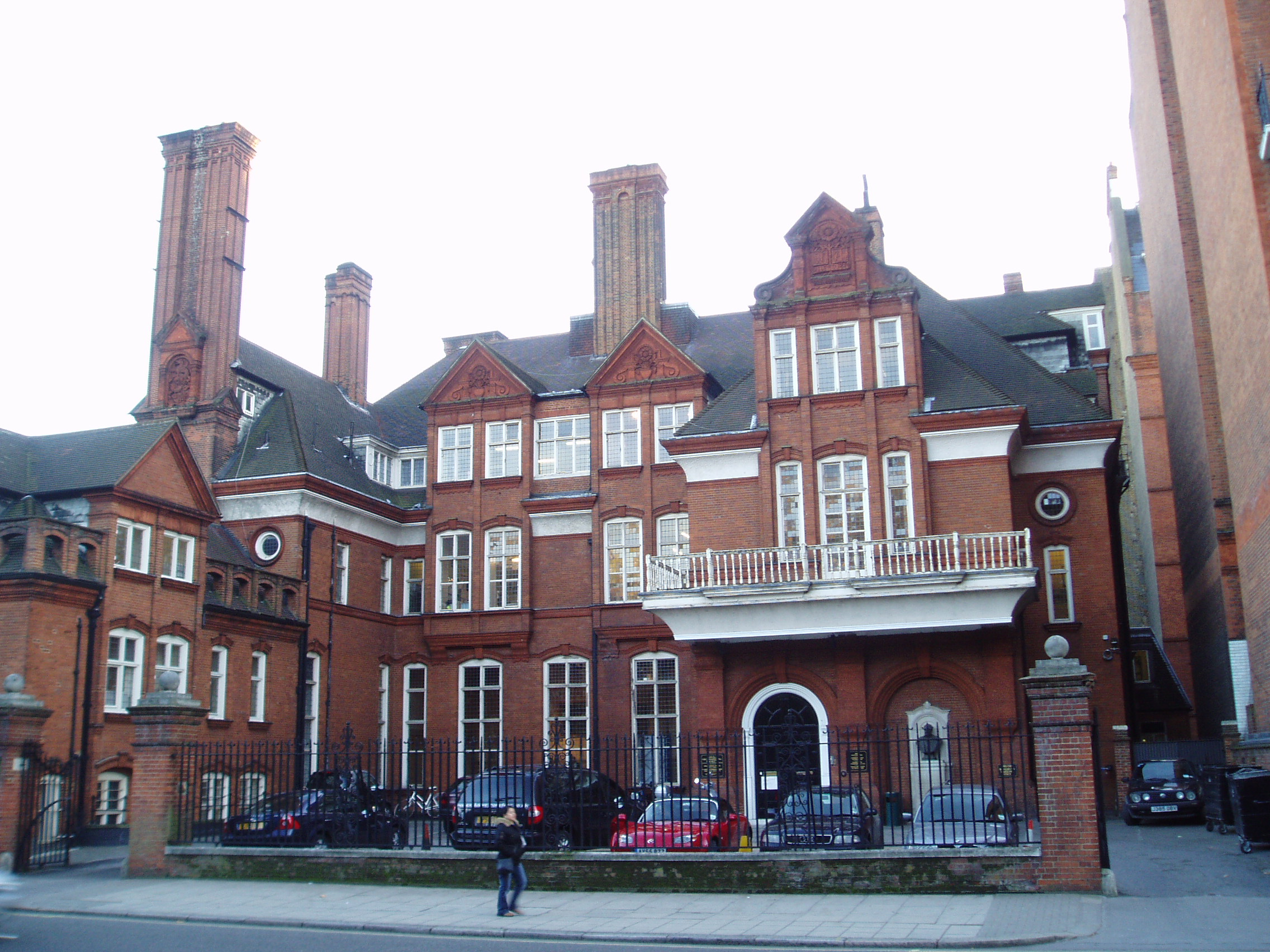
Lowther Lodge, Royal Geographical Society (with IBG) headquarters, designed by Richard Norman Shaw

The RGS was founded on 16 July 1830 under the name Geographical Society of London as an institution to promote the 'advancement of geographical science'. The seven founding members of the society were Sir John Barrow (geographer), Sir Roderick Murchison (geologist), Robert Brown (botanist), Lord Broughton (politician), Mountstuart Elphinstone (colonial administrator), Bartholomew Frere (diplomat), and William Henry Smyth (admiral). The first president of the society was the former prime minister Viscount Goderich and the first secretary was Alexander Maconochie (who became the first professor of Geography at the University College London), with another notable council member being Sir Francis Beaufort. Like many learned societies, it had started as a dining club in London, where select members held informal dinner debates on current scientific issues and ideas. It later absorbed the older African Association, which had been founded by Sir Joseph Banks in 1788, as well as the Raleigh Club and the Palestine Association.

From 1830 to 1840 the RGS met in the rooms of the Horticultural Society in Regent Street, London, and from 1854 to 1870 at 15 Whitehall Place, London. In 1870, the society finally found a home when it moved to 1 Savile Row, London. The society also used briefly a lecture theatre in Burlington Gardens, London which was lent to it by the Civil Service Commission.

Under the patronage of King William IV it later became known as the Royal Geographical Society (RGS) and was granted its royal charter under Queen Victoria in 1859. Another notable early member was Sir John Franklin.

The Society has been a key associate and supporter of many famous explorers and expeditions, including those of:

- Charles Darwin
- James Hingston Tuckey
- David Livingstone
- William Ogilvie
- Robert Falcon Scott
- Richard Francis Burton
- John Hanning Speke
- George W. Hayward
- Percy Fawcett
- Henry Morton Stanley
- Ernest Shackleton
- Sir Edmund Hillary
- Alfred Russel Wallace

A new impetus was given to society's affairs in 1911, with the election of Earl Curzon, the former viceroy of India, as the society's President (1911–1914). The premises in Savile Row (once described by Curzon as "cramped and rather squalid") were sold and the present site, Lowther Lodge in Kensington Gore, was purchased for £100,000 and opened for use in April 1913. In the same year the society's ban on women fellows was lifted.

Lowther Lodge was built in 1874 for the William Lowther by Norman Shaw, one of the most outstanding domestic architects of his day. Extensions to the east wing were added in 1929, and included the New Map Room and the 750 seat Lecture Theatre. The extension was formally opened by the Duke of York (later King George VI) at the RGS centenary celebrations on 21 October 1930.

The history of the society was closely allied for many of its earlier years with 'colonial' exploration in Africa, the Indian subcontinent, the polar regions, and central Asia especially.

It has been a key associate and supporter of many notable explorers and expeditions, including those of Darwin, Livingstone, Stanley, Scott, Shackleton, Hunt and Hillary.

The early history of the society is inter-linked with the history of British geography, exploration and discovery. Information, maps, charts and knowledge gathered on expeditions was sent to the RGS, making up its now unique geographical collections. The society published its first journal in 1831 and from 1855, accounts of meetings and other matters were published in the society proceedings. In 1893, this was replaced by The Geographical Journal which is still published today.

The society was also pivotal in establishing geography as a teaching and research discipline in British universities, and funded the first geography positions in the Universities of Oxford and Cambridge.

2012 Poster for exhibition in the glass Pavilion on centenary of Scott's final expedition to the South Pole

With the advent of a more systematic study of geography, the Institute of British Geographers (IBG) was formed in 1933, by thirteen geographers including Hilda Ormsby, Andrew Charles O'Dell, as the RGS was seen as too focused on exploration. IBG activities included organising conferences, field trips, seminars, and specialist research groups and publishing a journal, Transactions of the Institute of British Geographers. The RGS and IBG co-existed for 60 years until 1992 when a merger was discussed. In 1994, members were balloted and the merger agreed. In January 1995, the new Royal Geographical Society (with the Institute of British Geographers) was formed.

The society also works together with other existing bodies serving the geographical community, in particular the Geographical Association and the Royal Scottish Geographical Society.

In 2004, the RGS's historical collections relating to scientific exploration and research, which are of national and international importance, were opened to the public for the first time. In the same year, a new category of membership was introduced to widen access for people with a general interest in geography. The new Foyle Reading Room and glass Pavilion exhibition space were also opened to the public in 2004. For example, in 2012 the RGS held an exhibition, in the glass Pavilion, of photographs taken by Herbert Ponting on Captain Robert Falcon Scott's expedition to the South Pole in 1912.

== Governance ==
=== Council ===
The society is governed by its board of trustees called the council, which is chaired by its president. The members of council and the president are elected from its fellowship. The council consists of 36 members, 22 of which are elected by fellows and serve for a three-year term. In addition to the elected trustees, there are honorary members—who include the Duke of Kent as honorary president—who sit on the council.

The society has five specialist committees that it derives advice from: the Education Committee, Research Committee, Expedition and Fieldwork Committee, Information Resources Committee, and the Finance Committee.

=== Presidents ===
- 1830–1833 Frederick, Viscount Goderich
- 1833–1835 Sir George Murray
- 1835–1837 Sir John Barrow
- 1837–1839 William Richard Hamilton
- 1839–1841 George Greenough
- 1841–1843 William Richard Hamilton
- 1843–1845 Sir Roderick Murchison
- 1845–1847 Charles, Lord Colchester
- 1847–1849 William J. Hamilton
- 1849–1851 Admiral William Smyth
- 1851–1853 Sir Roderick Murchison
- 1853–1855 Francis, Earl of Ellesmere
- 1855–1856 Rear Admiral Frederick William Beechey (died in office)
- 1856–1859 Sir Roderick Murchison
- 1859–1860 George, Earl de Grey and Ripon
- 1860–1862 Bingham, Lord Ashburton
- 1862–1871 Sir Roderick Murchison
- 1871–1873 Sir Henry Rawlinson
- 1873–1874 Sir Henry Frere
- 1874–1876 Sir Henry Rawlinson
- 1876–1878 Sir Rutherford Alcock
- 1878–1879 Frederick, Earl of Dufferin
- 1879–1880 Thomas, Earl of Northbrook
- 1880–1885 Henry, Lord Aberdare
- 1885–1886 John, Marquis of Lorne
- 1886–1887 Henry, Lord Aberdare
- 1887–1889 Sir Richard Strachey
- 1889–1893 Sir Mountstuart Grant Duff
- 1893–1905 Sir Clements Markham
- 1905–1908 Sir George Goldie
- 1908–1911 Leonard Darwin
- 1911–1914 George, Earl Curzon of Kedleston
- 1914–1917 Douglas Freshfield
- 1917–1919 Sir Thomas Holdich
- 1919–1922 Francis Younghusband
- 1922–1925 Lawrence, Earl Ronaldshay
- 1925–1927 David George Hogarth
- 1927–1930 Charles Close
- 1930–1933 Admiral Sir William Goodenough
- 1933–1936 Sir Percy Cox
- 1936–1938 Henry Balfour
- 1938–1941 Sir Philip Chetwode
- 1941–1945 Sir George Clerk
- 1945–1948 Francis, Lord Rennell
- 1948–1951 Sir Harry Lindsay
- 1951–1954 Sir James Wordie
- 1954–1958 Sir James Marshall-Cornwall
- 1958–1961 Roger, Lord Nathan
- 1961–1963 Raymond Priestley
- 1963–1966 Sir Dudley Stamp
- 1966–1969 Sir Gilbert Laithwaite
- 1969–1971 Sir Edmund Irving
- 1971–1974 Edward, Lord Shackleton
- 1974–1977 Sir Duncan Cumming
- 1977–1980 John, Lord Hunt
- 1980–1982 Michael Wise
- 1982–1984 Sir Vivian Fuchs
- 1984–1987 Sir George Bishop
- 1987–1989 Roger, Lord Chorley
- 1989–1993 Sir Crispin Tickell
- 1993–1997 George, Earl Jellicoe
- 1997–2000 John, Earl Selborne
- 2000–2003 Sir Ronald Cooke
- 2003–2006 Sir Neil Cossons
- 2006–2009 Sir Gordon Conway
- 2009–2012 Sir Michael Palin
- 2012–2015 Dame Judith Rees
- 2015–2018 Nicholas Crane
- 2018–2021 Lynda, Baroness Chalker
- 2021–2024 Nigel Clifford
- 2024–present Dame Jane Francis

== Membership ==
There are four categories of individual membership:

=== Membership ===
Anyone with an interest in geography is eligible to apply to become a member of the RGS-IBG.

=== Student Membership ===
Students who are studying geography (or an allied subject) at GCSE, A Level or as an undergraduate (or at equivalent levels).

=== Associate Fellowship ===
This status is available by application from postgraduate students or those within five years of graduating from their first degree.

=== Fellowship ===
Fellows of the RGS come from a wide range of professional backgrounds. They must either be proposed by an existing fellow or an individual may submit evidence of his or her own work and academic publications in the field of geography and closely related subjects such as international development, climate change and expedition medicine. Applicants must be of at least 21 years of age and provide evidence of a body of relevant work; alternatively, a previous five-year commitment at the regular member level (less, at the council's discretion) is also considered for eligibility. Fellows may use the post-nominal designation FRGS after their names.

== Chartered geographer ==
Chartered geographer accreditation seal

Since 2002 the society has been granted the power to award the status of chartered geographer. The status can be obtained only by those who have a degree in geography or related subject and at least 6 years' geographical experience, or 15 years' geographical work experience for those without a degree. Being awarded the status allows the use of the post-nominal letters "CGeog".

Chartered geographer (teacher) is a professional accreditation available to teachers who can demonstrate competence, experience and professionalism in the use of geographical knowledge or skills in and out of the classroom, and who are committed to maintaining their professional standards through ongoing continuing professional development (CPD).

== Research groups ==
The society's research and study groups bring together active researchers and professional geographers in particular areas of geography. There are 27 active research groups, with each group organising their own seminars, conferences, workshops and other activities.

Research groups	
Biogeography Research Group	British Society for Geomorphology
Carceral Geography Research Group	Climate Change Research Group
Contract Research and Teaching Forum	Digital Geographies Research Group
Developing Areas Research Group	Economic geography Research Group
Geographical Information Science Research Group	Geography of Health and Wellbeing Research Group
Geography of Leisure and Tourism Research Group	Higher Education Research Group
Geographies of Justice Research Group	Coastal and Marine Research Group
Historical Geography Research Group	History and Philosophy of Geography Research Group
Mountain Research Group	Participatory Geographies Working Group
Planning and Environment Research Group	Political geography Research Group
Population geography Research Group	Postgraduate Forum
The Post-Socialist Geographies Research Group	Quantitative Methods Research Group
Rural Geography Research Group	Social and Cultural Geography Research Group
Space, Sexualities and Queer Research Group	Transport Geography Research Group
Urban geography Research Group	Women and Geography Research Group

== Medals and awards ==
The society also presents awards to geographers that have contributed to the advancement of geography.

The most prestigious of these awards are the Founder's Medal and the Patron's Medal. The award is given for "the encouragement and promotion of geographical science and discovery", and are approved by King Charles III. The awards originated as an annual gift of fifty guineas from King William IV, first made in 1831, "to constitute a premium for the encouragement and promotion of geographical science and discovery". The society decided in 1839 to change this monetary award into two gold medals: Founder's Medal and the Patron's. The award has been given to notable geographers including David Livingstone (1855), Nain Singh Rawat (1876), Baron Ferdinand von Richthofen (1878), Alfred Russel Wallace (1892), and Frederick Courtney Selous (1893) to more recent winners including Percy Harrison Fawcett (1916), Professor William Morris Davis (1919), Sir Halford John Mackinder (1945), Professor L. Dudley Stamp (1949), Professor Richard Chorley (1987) and Professor David Harvey (1995). In 2004 Harish Kapadia was awarded the Patron's Medal for contributions to geographical discovery and mountaineering in the Himalayas, making him the second Indian to receive the award in its history. In 2005 the Founder's Medal was awarded to Professor Sir Nicholas Shackleton for his research in the field of Quaternary Palaeoclimatology and the Patron's Medal was awarded to Professor Jean Malaurie for a lifelong study of the Arctic and its people. In 1902 they awarded khan Bahadur Sher Jang a Sword of Honour (the Black Memorial) in recognition of his valuable services to geography.

In total the society awards 17 medals and awards including honorary membership and fellowship. Some of the other awards given by the RGS include:

- The Victoria Medal (1902) for "conspicuous merit in research in Geography"
- The Murchison Award (1882) for the "publication judged to contribute most to geographical science in preceding recent years"
- The Back Award (1882) for "applied or scientific geographical studies which make an outstanding contribution to the development of national or international public policy"
- The Busk Medal (1975) for "conservation research or for fieldwork abroad in Geography or in a geographical aspect of an allied science"
- The Cuthbert Peek Award (1883) for "those advancing geographical knowledge of human impact on the environment through the application of contemporary methods, including those of earth observation and mapping"
- The Edward Heath Award (1984) for "geographical research in either Europe or the developing world"
- The Cherry Kearton Medal and Award for "a traveller concerned with the study or practice of natural history, with a preference for those with an interest in nature photography, art or cinematography".
- The Ness Award for "travellers, particularly those who have successfully popularised Geography and the wider understanding of our world and its environments"

== Collections ==
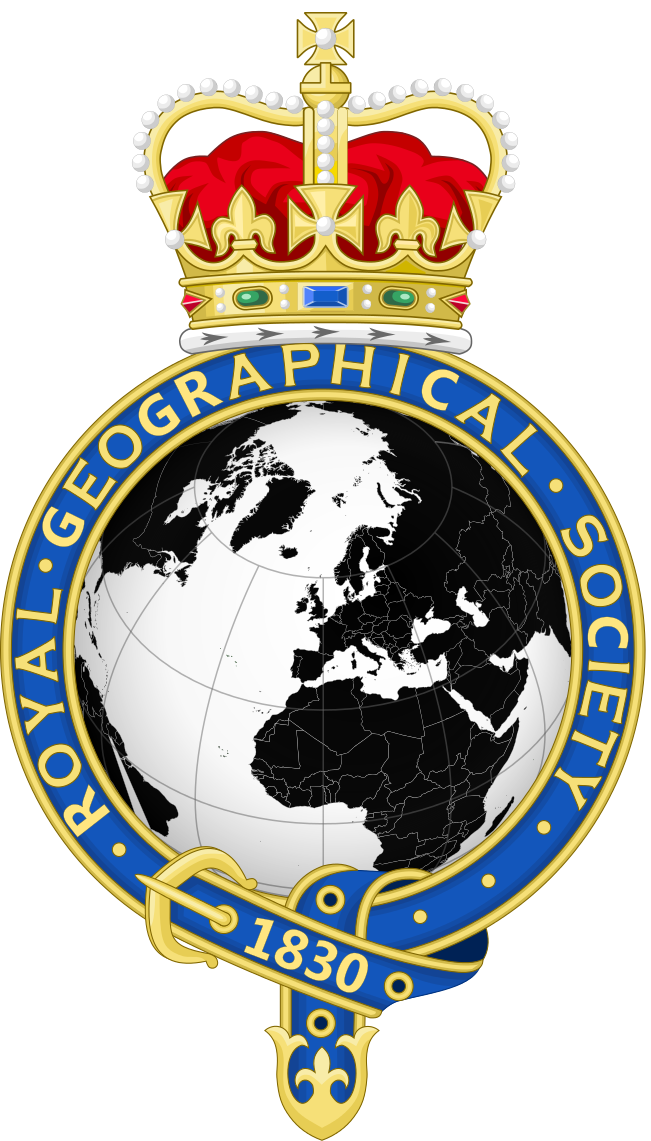
A representation of the historical emblem of the Royal Geographical Society

The society's collections consist of over two million documents, maps, photographs, paintings, periodicals, artefacts and books, and span 500 years of geography, travel and exploration. The society preserves the collections for the benefit of future generations, while providing public access and promoting collections-related educational programmes for schools and lifelong learners. The Foyle Reading Room acts as a consultation space for using the society's collections, and hosts showcases and workshops as well as the Be Inspired series of talks.

=== Artefacts ===
The artefacts collection includes over a thousand items brought to the society, consisting mainly of cultural objects from around the world, ranging from Inuit boots (from Canadian Arctic) to ceremonial leopard's claws (from the then Belgian Congo), paraphernalia of exploration, for example oxygen sets used in the various attempts on Everest, and personal items belonging to explorers, such as Shackleton's Burberry helmet. Artefacts from the collection have been loaned to exhibitions around the world and are in continual demand.

=== Books and journals ===
The library collection holds more than 150,000 bound volumes that focus on the history and geography of places worldwide. Example volumes include information on European migration, a 19th-century guidebook to Berlin, and David Livingstone's account of his search for the source of the Nile. It currently receives around 800 journal titles, as well as many more journal titles that are either not currently subscribed to, or have ceased publication, allowing society members access to the latest geographical academic literature in addition to the journals published by the RGS-IBG itself.

=== Expedition report ===
The RGS-IBG houses a collection of 4,500 expedition reports. These documents contain details of the achievements and research results of expeditions to almost every country of the world. The catalogue of these reports, and over 8,500 planned and past expeditions, is held on a database which provides contact with a wide variety of sporting, scientific and youth expeditions from 1965 to the present day.

=== Maps and atlases ===
The society holds one of the largest private map collections in the world which is continuously increasing. It includes one million sheets of maps and charts, 3000 atlases, 40 globes and 1000 gazetteers. The earliest printed item in the Collection dates back to 1482. The RGS-IBG also holds manuscript materials from the mid sixteenth century onwards, aerial photography from 1919 and contemporary satellite images.

=== Manuscript archive ===
The manuscript archive collection consists of material arising out of the conduct of society business and manuscripts relating to persons or subjects of special interest. The document collection includes a few papers from before the society's founding in 1830, and is particularly useful to biographers of nineteenth and early twentieth century travellers and geographers, as well as research into the development of geographical knowledge and the historical development of geography.

=== Events recordings ===
Since 1994, the society has recorded the majority of its Monday night lectures. Society members and fellows can watch selected lectures from 2006 onward online.

=== Photographs and artworks ===
The society's picture library holds over half a million photographs, artworks, negatives, lantern slides and albums dating from around 1830. Historic images range from the Antarctic adventures of Scott and Shackleton to the pioneering journeys of Livingstone, Baker, Speke and Burton.

== Grants ==
The RGS-IBG provides funding for geographical research and scientific expeditions. The society offers a number of grants to researchers, students, teachers and independent travellers. More than 70 projects are supported each year and in excess of £180,000 is awarded annually. Research has been conducted in more than 120 countries, from Namibia to Brazil to Greenland.

=== Expeditions, fieldwork and independent travel grants ===
Every year the RGS-IBG helps teams of students and researchers to get into the field with Geographical Fieldwork Grants, the society's longest running grant scheme. The newest initiative is the RGS-IBG International Field Centre Grants, for work in international field centres in developing nations. Independent travel grants support geographical expeditions.

=== Student grants ===
Each year, the society supports more than 50 student fieldwork projects, from PhD students collecting data for their dissertation to groups of undergraduates looking to get out into the field for the first time. Grants are available for both human and physical geography projects, in any area of the world.

=== Research grants ===
The society supports a range of field and desk-based research by academic geographers, from established researchers undertaking fieldwork to early career academics working on smaller projects. The RGS-IBG also supports academics attending geographical conferences around the world. Some awards focus on particular geographical regions or topics, with others open to any aspect of the discipline.

=== Teaching grants ===
The society supports innovation in teaching geography at secondary and higher education level, offering several awards for school teachers to work alongside researchers in geographical research, so to develop educational resources for the classroom, and to create teaching materials.

== Public engagement ==
=== 21st Century Challenges ===
21st Century Challenges is the society's discussion series that aims to improve public understanding of, and engagement with, some of the big issues likely to affect our lives and society in the coming years. The talks are held at the society's headquarters with all talks available to watch online along with additional information.

=== Discovering Britain ===
Discovering Britain is a website featuring a series of self-led geographical walks that help explain the stories behind the UK's built and natural landscapes. Each walk explores a particular landscape, finding out about the way in which the forces of nature, people, events and the economy have created and shaped the area. There are now more than 120 walks on the Discovering Britain website, covering all regions of the United Kingdom. Walks are themed according to the landscape in which they are located, including built, prehistoric, historic, working, hidden and changing landscapes. Walks also look at people in the landscape, and shaping, preserving and exploiting the landscape.

=== Hidden Journeys ===
Hidden Journeys is a public engagement project of the Royal Geographical Society (with IBG) that started in 2010. The Hidden Journeys website combines images, stories and maps (many from the society's geographical collections) into a series of interactive guides of popular flight paths, enabling people to explore the incredible places they fly over and might see from the air. Since launching, online guides have been published for more than 25 flight paths, including London to Johannesburg, New York City to Los Angeles, Sydney to Singapore, Madrid to Rio de Janeiro.

The Hidden Journeys project is also integrating its content with the moving maps aboard airliners, as a new form of in-flight entertainment (IFE) that has been termed geo-entertainment or geotainment.

In December 2013, Singapore Airlines began a trial of an enhanced moving map that featured Hidden Journeys content. Developed in partnership between Hidden Journeys and the IFE software company Airborne Interactive, the enhanced map is available for the Singapore-London route on the airline's brand new Boeing 777-300ER (flight number SQ308 and SQ319), and features a range of geographical facts and highlights, photography and maps, all curated by the Royal Geographical Society (with IBG). Information is delivered in real time, with content changing as the flight progresses, so for example, while a passenger is passing over the United Kingdom, they'll be met with a pop-up that explains the origins and importance of the English Channel.

== Schools ==
The RGS-IBG education department offers courses, resources, accreditation, grants, awards, competitions and school membership, all for the benefit of teachers, students and parents. It also runs the Geography Ambassador scheme.

=== Educational resources ===
The society produces cases studies, lesson plans and activity ideas for an all levels of learning, from KS1 up to post-GCSE. The Geography in the News website is available for student members and young geographers. It has more than 300 topical case studies. Many of the society's other resources are free to use.

=== Geography Ambassadors ===
The Geography Ambassadors scheme recruits, trains and supports volunteer undergraduate, postgraduate and graduate geographers from universities and business. Geography Ambassadors deliver lively, activity-based sessions at schools and they engage with more than 30,000 pupils each year. The scheme is aimed at introducing students to the benefits of studying geography beyond a compulsory level in schools, but also into higher education and employment.

=== Competitions ===
The society also has competitions for students studying geography. The Young Geographer of the Year has four categories for students in KS2 through to A-Level. All students have to produce posters on a given topic, except the A-Level students who are expected to write an essay. For A-Level students there is also the David W. Smith Memorial Award, an annual essay competition, and the Ron Cooke Award for the best A-Level coursework.

== Publications ==
=== Journals ===
The Royal Geographical Society (with IBG)'s scholarly publications provide an outlet and support for the dissemination of research across the breadth of the discipline. The society states that its research publications are accessed over a million times per year.

- Area: has an annual prize for new researchers.
- GEO (journal)|GEO: Geography and Environment: an open access journal launched in 2014.
- The Geographical Journal (GJ): focusing on public debates and policy-oriented agendas.
- Transactions of the Institute of British Geographers: one of the international journals of geographical research.
- WIREs: Climate Change: developed in association with the Royal Meteorological Society and Wiley-Blackwell, this review journal provides an important new encyclopaedic reference for climate change scholarship and research.

=== Magazine ===
Geographical is the official monthly magazine of the RGS, and has been published continuously since 1935. The magazine contains illustrated articles on people, places, adventure, travel, and environmental issues, as well as summarising the latest academic research and discoveries in geography. Geographical also reports news of the society's latest work and activities to members and the public.

== See also ==
- Concepts and Techniques in Modern Geography
- Gamma Theta Upsilon
- Hakluyt Society
- History of science
- List of British professional bodies
- List of Royal Societies
- Royal Geographical Society of Australasia
- Royal Institution
- Royal Scottish Geographical Society
