= Royal Horse Guards =

British Army cavalry regiment

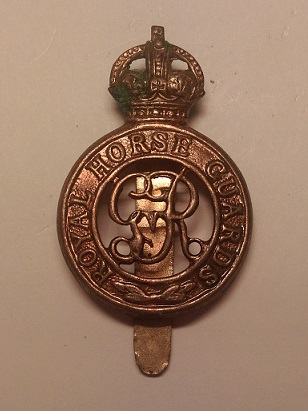
- Cap badge of the regiment (with royal cypher of George V)
- Active: 1650–1660; 1661–1969
- Country: Commonwealth of England (1650–1660); Kingdom of England (1660–1707); Kingdom of Great Britain (1707–1800); United Kingdom (1801–1969)
- Branch: British Army
- Type: Cavalry
- Role: Exploitation and armoured assault
- Size: Divisional
- Garrison/HQ: Windsor
- Nicknames: "The Oxford Blues" "The Blue Guards" "The Blues"
- Motto: Honi soit qui mal y pense
- March: Quick March: Grand March; Slow March: Regimental Slow March of the Royal Horse Guards
- Mascot: Newfoundland dog
- Engagements: See Battle honours list

Commanders
- Notable commanders: Maj Gen Richard Howard-Vyse; Earl of Oxford; Lt Col Sir Robert Hill; Lt Gen Marquess of Granby; General Duke of Marlborough

The Royal Regiment of Horse Guards, also known as the Blues, or abbreviated as RHG, was one of the cavalry regiments of the British Army and part of the Household Cavalry. In 1969, it was amalgamated with the 1st The Royal Dragoons to form the Blues and Royals.

Raised in August 1650 by Sir Arthur Haselrig on the orders of Oliver Cromwell, following the 1660 Stuart Restoration, it became the Earl of Oxford's Regiment in 1660. Based on the colour of their uniform, the regiment was nicknamed "the Oxford Blues", or simply the "Blues." In 1750, it became the Royal Horse Guards Blue and eventually, in 1877, the Royal Horse Guards (The Blues).

== Origins and history ==
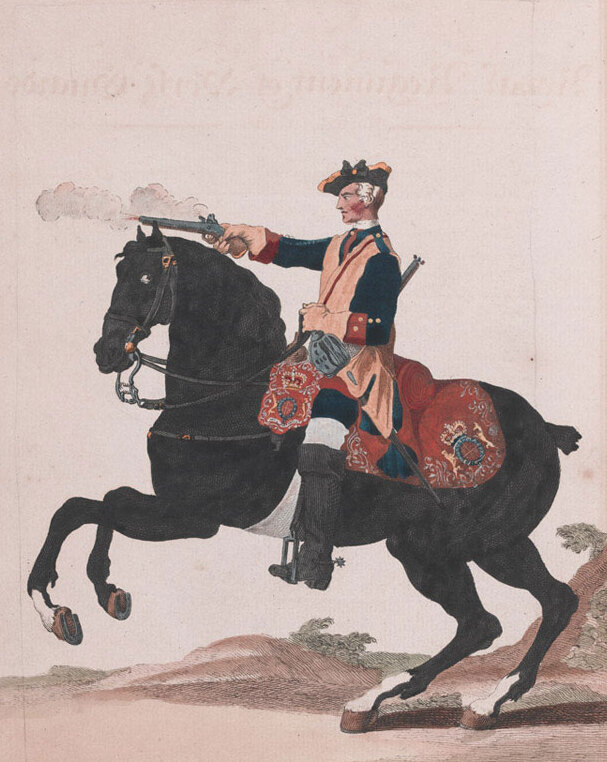
c. 1742 engraving of a regimental private

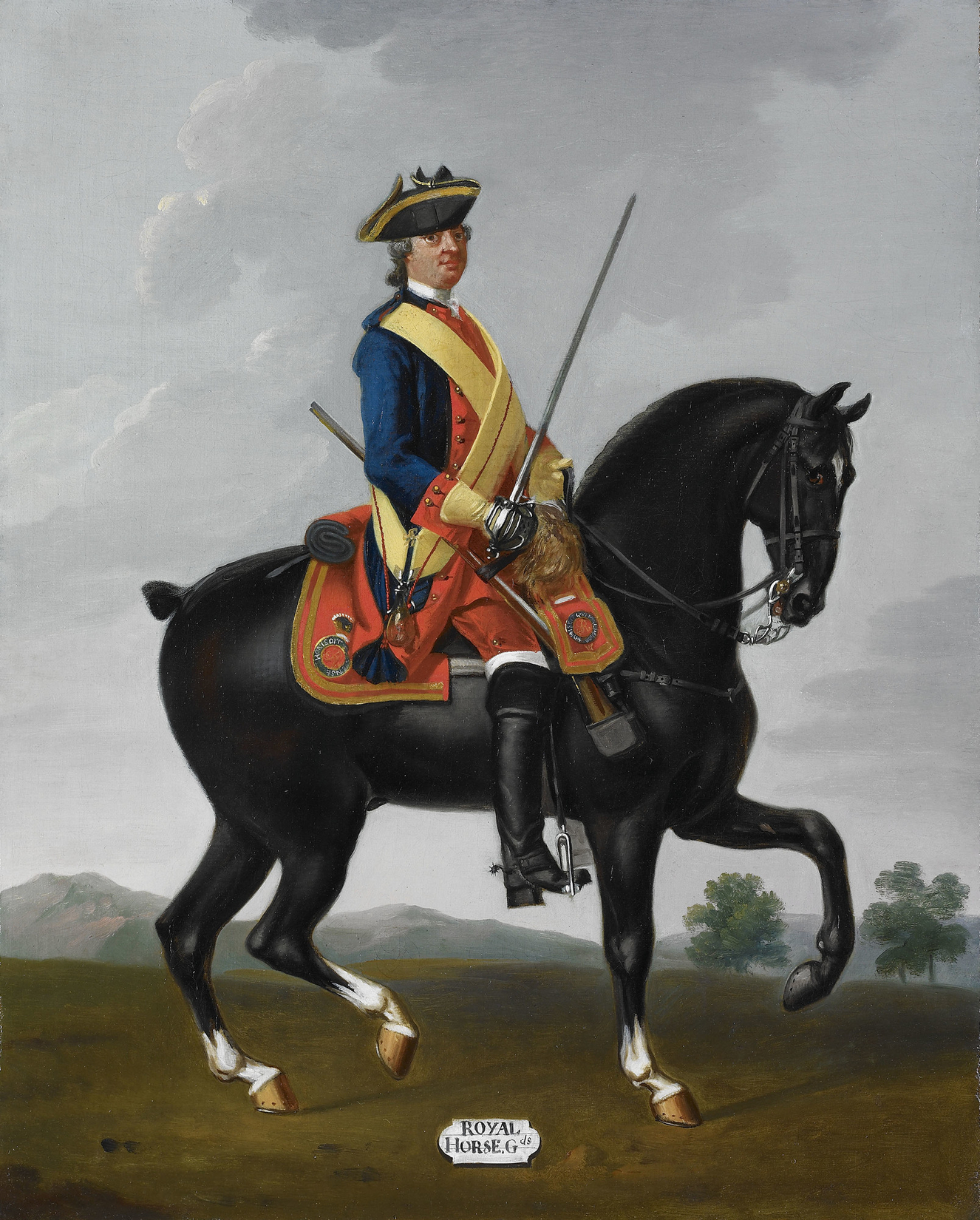
c. 1751 painting of a regimental private

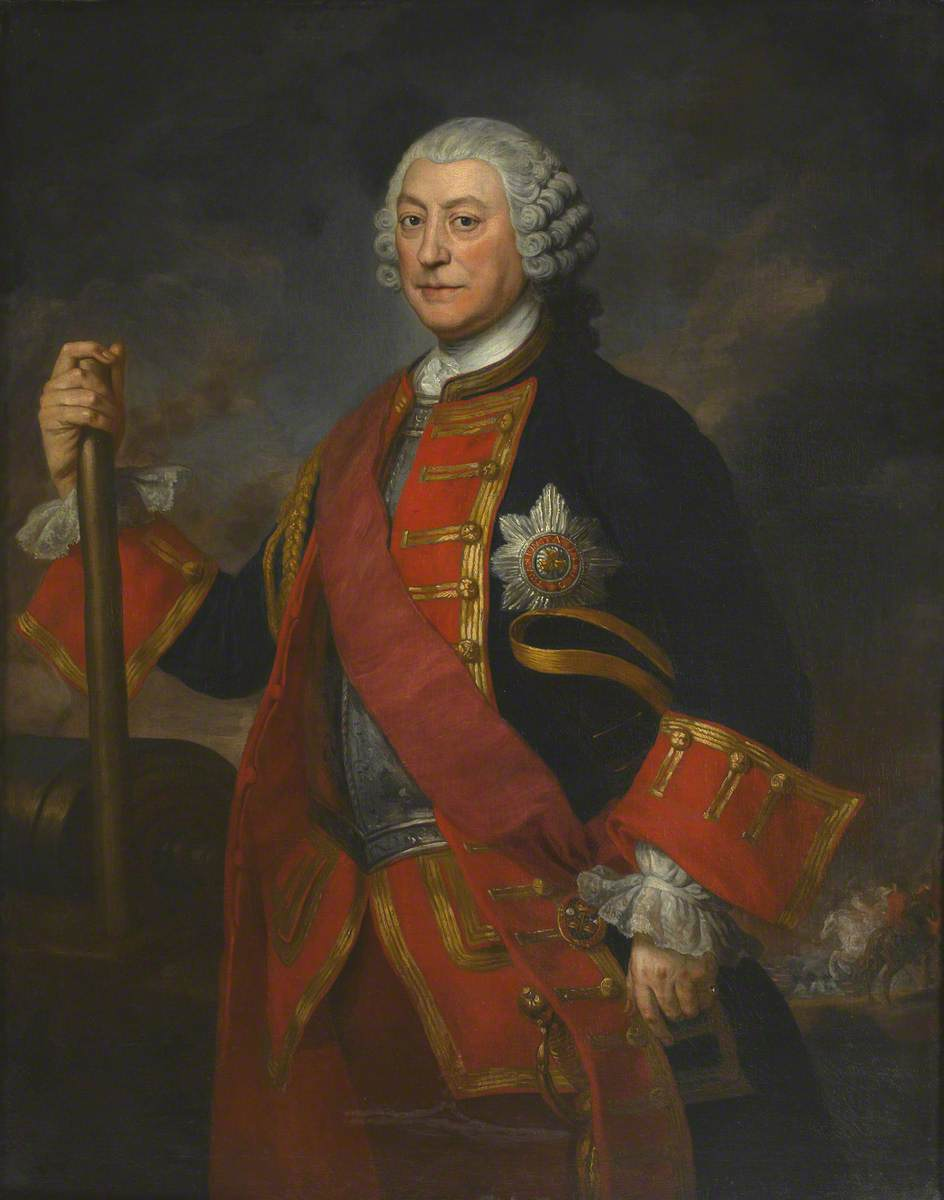
c. 1754 portrait of John Ligionier as the regimental colonel

The Royal Regiment of Horse Guards has its origins in the Regiment of Cuirassiers, raised by Sir Arthur Haselrig on the orders of Oliver Cromwell at Newcastle upon Tyne and County Durham in August 1650. It was initially disbanded following the 1660 Stuart Restoration, before being re-constituted in the wake of the Venner Riots and creation of the English Army on 26 January 1661. The colonelcy of the new regiment was given to Aubrey de Vere, 20th Earl of Oxford, and the regiment first paraded at Tothill Fields in London on 6 February 1661.

Early duties focused on internal policing and domestic security, with three troops based primarily in Canterbury, Southwark, and Bagshot. When James II of England succeeded in February 1685 it was recalled to do policing duties in London. John Churchill, later Earl of Marlborough deserted the royal household to greet William, Prince of Orange in 1688. The following year The Blues were part of the allied army that defeated the French at Walcourt, near Charleroi, when they charged the best French infantry, leaving 2,000 dead.

=== Wars of succession ===
During the early eighteenth century the Blues were widely dispersed throughout the north country. Following the outbreak of the War of the Austrian Succession in 1740, the Royals became part Honywood's brigade, arriving in Flanders in August 1742. An account of the campaign was provided by Dr John Buchanan, the regimental surgeon. The unit took part in the 1743 Battle of Dettingen, after which the Household Cavalry Brigade was formed for the first time, comprising the Life Guards, Horse Grenadiers, and Blues.

=== Granby and Seven Years' War ===
During the Seven Years' War, the Blues fought alongside Prince Ferdinand. The largest cavalry regiment, The Blues colonelcy was assumed by John Manners, Marquess of Granby. This great soldier understood the importance of morale. In the mould of John Ligonier, 1st Earl Ligonier, a predecessor, he established a brave and efficient force. His successor, Henry Seymour Conway was one of the greatest colonels the regiment ever had over a 25-year period. Granby however, retained a passionate interest in the welfare of The Blues; his generosity and hospitality expressed later in a legion of public houses. Granby was in charge of the second division at Battle of Minden Heath in August 1759. The Blues posted sentries called Vedettes, who were so close when the French attacked that the regiment was thrown back. The Blues were eager to charge in after the infantry surge to Minden walls, but owing to Lord George Sackville's orders the reinforcements were delayed. Sackville was court-martialled and found guilty of disobeying orders.

The allies had saved Hanover, and driven Marshal Louis Georges Érasme de Contades back towards the Rhine. By December 1759 The Blues were exhausted looking forward to a winter break at Osnabrück. Lieutenant-Colonel Johnston went to recruit in England; and found the Dragoon Guards who wanted to join for the superior conditions in The Blues. Granby was depressed by his son's death and that of his wife too, and the loss of his stud, so he decided to set up a Widows' Fund, and to provide better regimental medical care. His cousin, Russell Manners was raised to battalion command; and King George II's interest in The Blues was inherited by George III. Granby commanded The Blues and The Royals on their march south from Paderborn. At Warburg on 31 July 1760, The Blues lined up in the centre. The British force of 8,000 stole a march on the French positions, and charging headlong into the enemy dispersed a force of 24,000. The famous 'Charge' on trumpet and bugle sent Granby's men into history:

For we Rout'd all before us – Down precipices, over hollow ways we went like a torrent as the French general term'd it, which struck such a panick so that they [led] without firing a shot. The Marquis of Granby pursued the enemy above 10 miles.

In February 1761, The Gold Stick, Granby led The Blues and others in a brilliant campaign. The French were hunkered down when surprised by the allies on the march, driving them back 50 miles over muddy roads. The regiment was present in the summer at the Villinghausen when they took a force twice their size led by Charles, Prince of Soubise, with the flexible use of artillery fire; the cavalry unable to gallop in the terrain. 15th Light Dragoons and The Blues encountered a skirmishing force at Wilhelmsthal on 1 July 1761. The cavalry realizing the enemy's presence took the initiative, demoralizing the French while the infantry finished. ADC Henry Townshend wounded at Vellinghausen, was killed with a trooper and three horses. Henry Seymour Conway marched the regiment to a triumphal return to England in March 1763. On demobilization, the troopers were reduced from 52 to 29 men per troop.

If Granby's grief at his son's loss was saddening, the crippling reductions to The Blues, according to William Pitt the Elder doomed "the bravest men the world ever saw to be sent to starve in country villages and forget their prowess." The harvest failures of the 1760s were compounded by rioting. The Blues were depressed to leave ex-comrades in Germany; they were used as militia for policing duties. Granby died in January 1770, to be replaced by General Seymour Conway as colonel.

=== Reform at Horse Guards ===
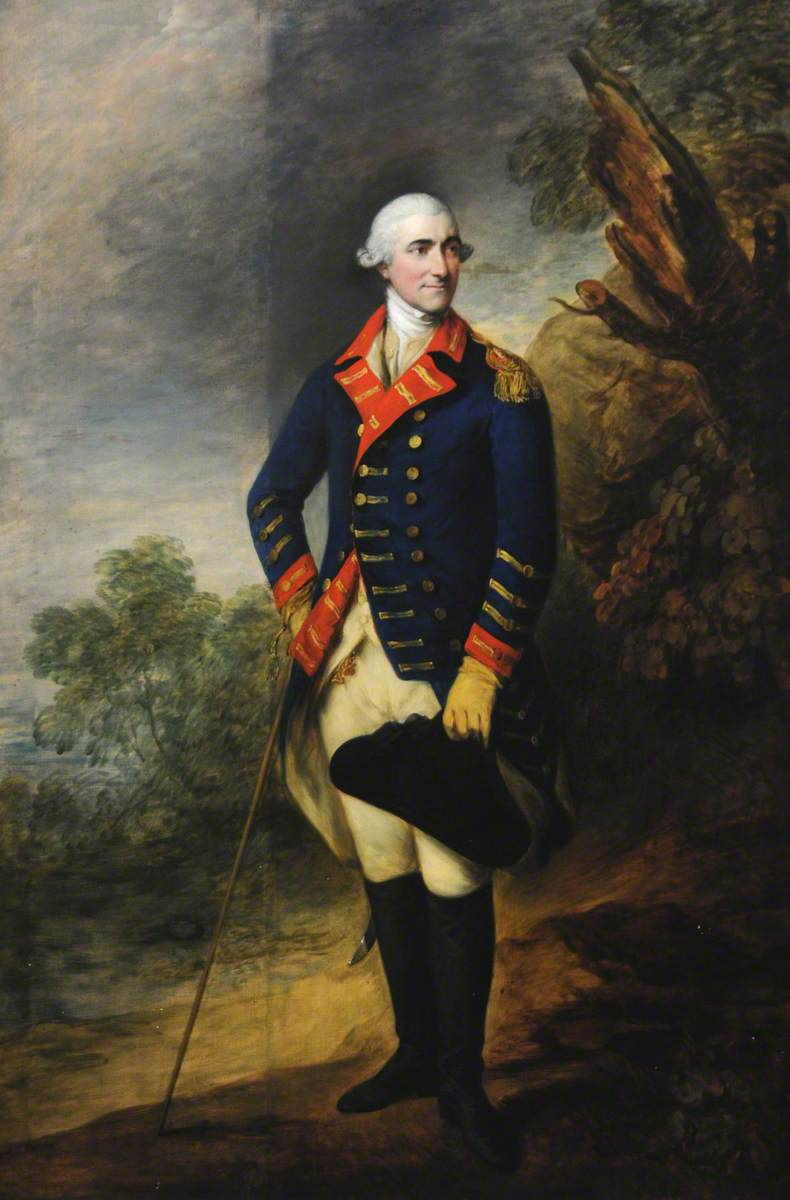
Henry Seymour Conway, who became the regimental colonel in 1770

On returning to civil duties again in 1795 The Blues were expected to maintain public order in Loughborough and Coventry; developing the doctrinal laws of absolute military necessity. They also patrolled the shoreline for smugglers. The Blues for the most part remained in the East Midlands. In 1788 and 1789 The Blues were required to come to London to mount up the King's Life Guard, as there were inadequate personnel in the Life Guards thanks to reorganization and reform. The lack of recruits threatened the Expeditionary Forces viability in Holland. The Blues were part of a contingent of 3,500 cavalry who departed Northampton with Sir Charles Turner.

In June 1793 The Blues were royal reviewed at Northampton. Commanded by Lt-Colonel Turner, they disembarked at Ostend on 15 June. They marched to join the allied army at Valenciennes, being besieged by Prince Josias of Saxe-Coburg-Saalfeld. The Blues and The Royals encountered the French at Dunkirk in a sea board march. Lieutenant Board was unhorsed and killed by a cannonball. Skirmishes continued all year, and by November they retired to winter in Ghent. The new Depot System worked well, and 1794 started with promise of success. The Blues were in Major General John Mansel's brigade, as the allies laid siege to Landrecies. Mansel was criticized as being slow to engage the enemy, when a large French force left Cambrai on 23 April 1794. Mansel was still in command when the allied army took a position north of Cambrai on the Beaumont road. Mansel vowed to avenge the shame of 24th, he told Prince Frederick, Duke of York, which he did charging and scattering the enemy, but was killed. The French line caught totally off guard were broken in the open, losing 5,000 men. The Blues lost 15 men, Quartermaster John Kipling, and 25 horses. In total allied casualties were 150. The regiment earned the epithet "Immortals" in this action.

Now commanded by Ralph Dundas, the Blues and the Royals pursued the French infantry northwards from Beaumont trapping them in a quagmire near the village of Baisieux. A French general was fought to a standstill and run through by Private Joseph White.

The battered French army retreated to Tournai. York moved into Roubaix, but Francis II, Holy Roman Emperor had run out on the allies, and returned to Vienna. The Blues returned to the depot at Northampton.

=== The Blues find a permanent home at Windsor ===
In 1796 The Blues received new weapons – the curved sabre, and the Nock Pattern Carbine. A reorganization at Horse Guards posted The Blues to a new base at Windsor. George III liked the regiment, who acted as royal bodyguards. A new barracks was built on 14 acres at Clewer Park in 1800, where a permanent barracks was built over a period of four years: 62 eight-bed dormitories for the men. Whilst life in the mess got more expensive and sociable, rates of pay stagnated. It was even more a requirement that all officers came from a moneyed background. By 1790 cornets were required to be aged eighteen, stabilizing entrants qualifications, and enabling purchasing to advance promotion rapidly. Quartermaster purchases attracted very modest incomers, raising a prospect for class mobility. And by 1800 only nine regimental commissions had transferred out in 20 years. But recruitment of cornets remained difficult in peacetime.

Recruits had to pay as much as 5 guineas for a riding lesson. Officer cadets would study Regulations for the formation and Movement of the Cavalry, spending a year at regimental HQ. In 1802, The British Military Library journal was established to educate on military tactics. Stable parades happened four times daily, and great care was taken of horses. Field day drills took place in Windsor Great Park or on Winkfield Plain every Friday. Quartermaster became an increasingly responsible rank. Wives were permitted to share at Clewer Park. Messes were created for NCO's. During the Peninsular War gambling became fashionable amongst Blues' officers; and several ran up huge debts. They became a popular regiment in a royal location. Duelling was common and sent up in a number of parodies as described in the Blueviad.

More serious was the rioting of 1810 which ended in the attempted arrest of Sir Francis Burdett MP. The mob cried out for the Radical Burdett cajoling the government into ordering troops in from Clewer Park. Under the Regency Act, the King was incapacitated, therefore the Prince Regent demanded The Blues turn out in its smartest dress with the Life Guards. They were on crowd control duties on 19 June 1811 at the opening of parliament. When Princess Amelia died, they escorted the funeral cortege, on 13 November 1810, every fourth man carried a flambeau, a fact which was for the first time in the Annual Register. On the opening of parliamentary session for 1812, they marched with the Prince Regent to Westminster. But from May 1812 they were at barracks in Warrington, Lancashire to quell serious bread riots and, so had been unable to prevent the assassination of Spencer Perceval, the Prime Minister, on 11 May. Designed to also assuage the volatile rhetoric of Burdett who labelled the Household Cavalry in the Commons as "the military murders". While the Blues had not been involved with the Life Guards arrest of the MP, the Blues had trampled onlookers in the Windsor riots when the horses ran scared. Hence, the old military adage "hold your horses".

=== With Wellington's Peninsular Army ===
Detachments of Blues were increased from six to eight, as four troops embarked at Portsmouth for Portugal in October 1812. (Note: One such new recruit to commission was Lieutenant Arthur de Capell Brooke (1791–1858), later an esteemed adventurer and founder of the Travellers Club.) Their new colonel was the rich Hugh Percy, 2nd Duke of Northumberland, who used experience, had served in the American wars, and now wished to spend a small fortune on the regimental band. Unfortunately, he clashed with Horse Guards over the modernized regimental kit, which the Duke wanted to ditch for the traditional. His particular disagreement with Arthur Wellesley, Marquess of Wellington was the appointment of senior officers, which Northumberland, ever the optimist, considered within his purview. He lost the argument and replaced by Wellington himself on 1 January 1813 as colonel of the regiment. Horse Guards' military secretary Colonel Henry Torrens had told the regimental commander, Sir Robert Chambre Hill that such appointments were unauthorised. "I have never conceived the Corps to possess such a privilege ... unless the evidence could be adduced", wrote the C-in-C the Duke of York from Oatlands Palace on 25 October. The Blues could not have the same access to the Sovereign as the Life Guards retorted the Duke, but were paid more than other regiments. On 10 December he concluded:

It was never contemplated that a course of such indulgence could have been construed into a matter of right without any one document to show that a privilege of such a nature was ever conferrer.

Having discounted any principle of customary succession, Wellington felt free to promote on merit, which he achieved from 1813, already considering the Blues as part of the Household Cavalry. Captain Charles Murray was promoted to command 2nd Troop, brought off half-pay, on the basis solely of rank. The inability to promote from within by the Duke unduly caused his resignation on the augmentation of the Household regiments. The furious Northumberland vowed never to support the Tories again. But the Duke of York's "firmness" had shown the chain of command could not be challenged by a colonel. Adverting to a new cornet vacancy, Lord William Lennox was duly dispatched to Spain in early 1813.

One of Wellington's first acts as colonel was to employ Greenwood, Cox & Co as agents. They had long been known to him but now he arranged to supply all their provisioning guaranteed by Whitehall. Messrs Bruce and Brown were recruited to provide clothing. The colonel was forced to make savings, excluding the maintenance of a band. Wellington founded the principle commissioning system of Ne Plus Ultra (Not a penny more), later the name given to his Tory supporters in the Commons.

The youthful troopers dispatched, they travelled with light camping equipment, and acquired a regimental mascot, a Newfoundland dog. In April 1812 General Wellington aimed to make a decisive assault on Madrid. To capture the Spanish capital he sent a cavalry division, including The Blues at first under General Francis Slater Rebow's brigade and then Sir Robert. By about 15 January 1813 the Blues had reached Thomar. Hill was ordered to rendez-vous at Alba de Tormes, crossing the Douro the army pressed on to the city of Salamanca. After quarters in monasteries the brigade forded the Douro at Toro on 4 June. Two days they escorted the reserve artillery to Valoria; totally outflanked the enemy withdrew to Burgos. Encamped outside Burgos the brigade was awakened by a huge explosion at dawn on 13 January: the French had decided to blow up the Castle of Burgos. In a lightning quick march, Wellington circled across the Ebro cutting off the French retreat to Vitoria at Puente da Arenas. The Household Cavalry were ordered to Carcarno with the reserves. Hill was ordered to seize the bridges at La Puebla in preparation for a three-pronged assault on the French positions in the mountainous passes. Arriving at Subijana de Álava Hill's brigade rolled back the French left onto Vitoria. In 1813, Major Packe took temporary command in the Battle of Vitoria, traversing a deep ravine along the Pamplona road. The Blues, with Household brigade already engaged, wheeled right across the ravine. Bivouacked on the road at Pamplona, General Hill had orders to hold it as the Life Guards gave chase. The deftness of the manoeuvre embarrassed the French generals: the defeat ended Napoleon's grip on Spain. The victory earned Wellington a Field Marshal's baton.

The Blues were sent home in 1814 via St Jean de Luz, where they were joined by three fresh squadrons under Captains Irby and Kenyon and Major Fitzgerald. Stapleton Cotton could not praise highly enough the regiment's conduct, so while the older Life Guards were sent home, the Blues remained on active service. Marching to Bayonne and Pau they arrived at Toulouse on 10 April 1814.

=== Waterloo ===
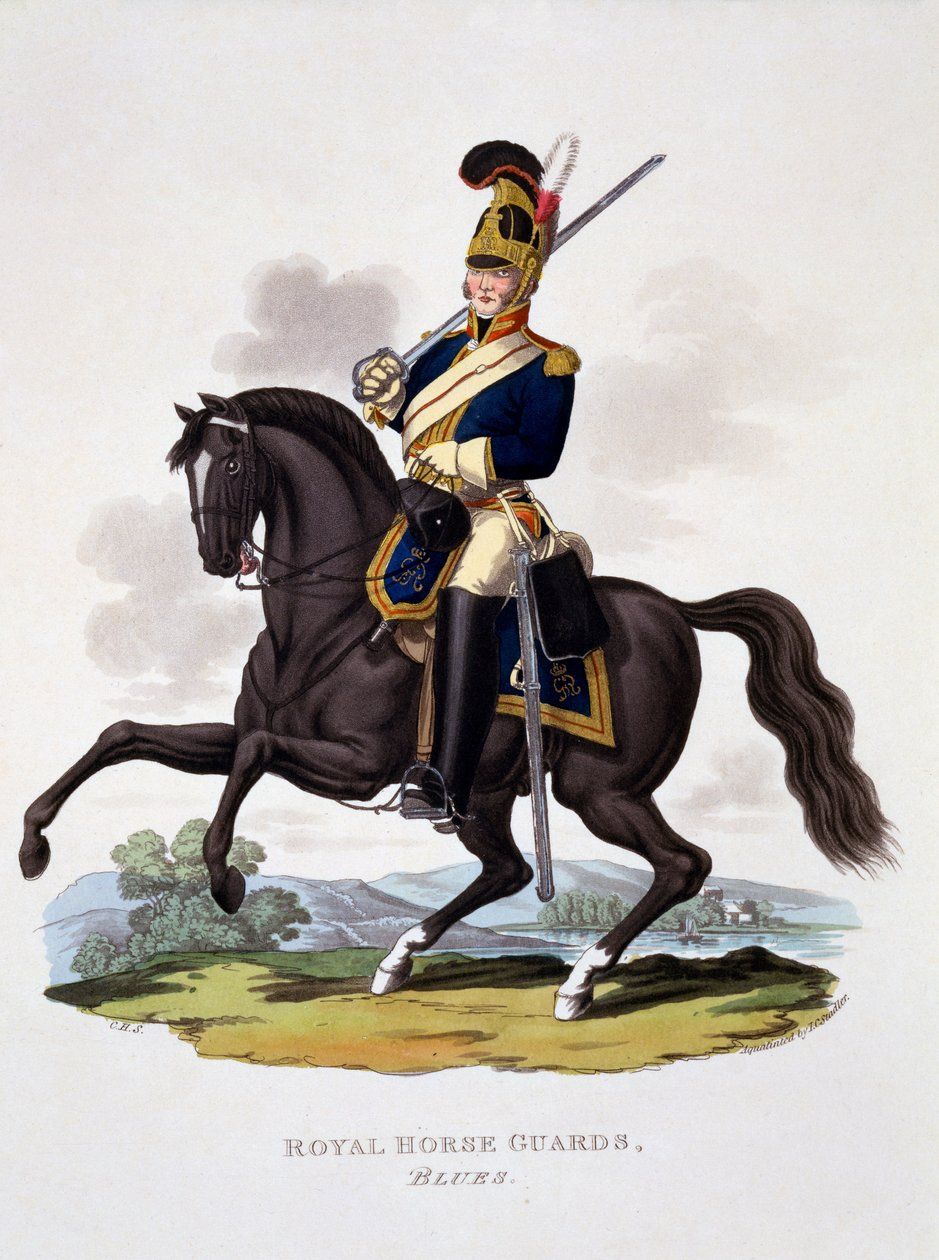
1814 engraving of a regimental private

Robert Hill was appointed to command The Blues in his brother's stead. The eldest was ennobled, and the youngest was ADC; but in fact Hill commanded a brigade of artillery on the extreme right of the line near Hougoumont. (Note: Royals (English) Scots Greys, Eniskilling (Irish) commanded by Sir William Ponsonby) They were in Lord Uxbridge's Cavalry corps of 14,550 troops. Not Wellington's first choice, Uxbridge was richly attired, powerful, with influential friends, and a showman to boot. The Oxford Blues were in the mid-column of Sir John Eiley's Household Brigade, when they marched in the early hours of 16 June 1815 towards Quatre Bras via Enghien down narrow Belgian lanes. They spent an uncomfortable night; the weather was hot and humid and it rained all night. As dawn broke, heavy rain made the ground a quagmire. On the day of battle, The Blues drew up in the second line behind the Life Guards. They should have held the formation, when Uxbridge gave the order to charge. Robert Hill was wounded in the clash with the 4th Cuirassiers, shot by a chasseur. Major Packe was run through and fell dead off his horse; indeed all the commanding officers in the brigade were slain in their ferocious attack on the Curassiers. Many hundreds of Frenchmen were killed, and 1,200 taken prisoner. Charging through the regiment was in danger of going too far from La Haye Sainte, they were rescued by General Somerset. They fought Michel Ney's cavalry to a standstill, until Gebhard Leberecht von Blücher's Prussians appeared to the left, and recovered the hilltop commanded by La Haye.

One historical record that emerges is the perfunctory effectiveness of the surgery on the battlefield of Waterloo. For example, only six of the wounded fifty Blues actually died. They lost 44 killed. Some reported barbarism by the French upon prisoners. Waterloo proved the Guards were fit for active service.

...when we was about two hundred yards from the French lines a cannon ball came and took off my horses leg so I dismounted but looking around I saw a horse that somebody had been killed off so I soon got another. So we continued in that state until night the Prussians came up and began to work and the French began to run and a happy sight it was.

Trumpeter Tom Evans who had saved General Robert Hill's life, retired to start a pub in Old Windsor, called the Oxford Blue. The Cavalry left Brussels and rode on to Paris.

On 22 June 1815, Napoleon abdicated having lost the support of the Assembly. All was lost for the Emperor. Marshal Grouchy's corps was still intact, and Marshal Davout in Paris was willing to fight on, but France was beaten. The Household Brigade reached Boissy, a town already looted by the Prussians, only 12 miles from Paris, and the war was already over.

Until early 1816, the British were an army of occupation on French soil. They took time to recover, and restock the regiments, recruit more men, and promote survivors. The Blues returned to the barracks at Windsor. The decisive point for the Cavalry at Waterloo came when the Household and Union Brigades had charged d'Erlon's Corps, making the cavalry brigades national heroes for a few years afterwards. On Lady Day, 25 March 1816, a medal was struck for "Waterloo men", the first to be so since Battle of Dunbar in 1650. It started a Victorian tradition rewarding gallantry, bravery and valorous conduct has remained to this day, through a system of medal awards as commemoration.

=== The Household Blues ===
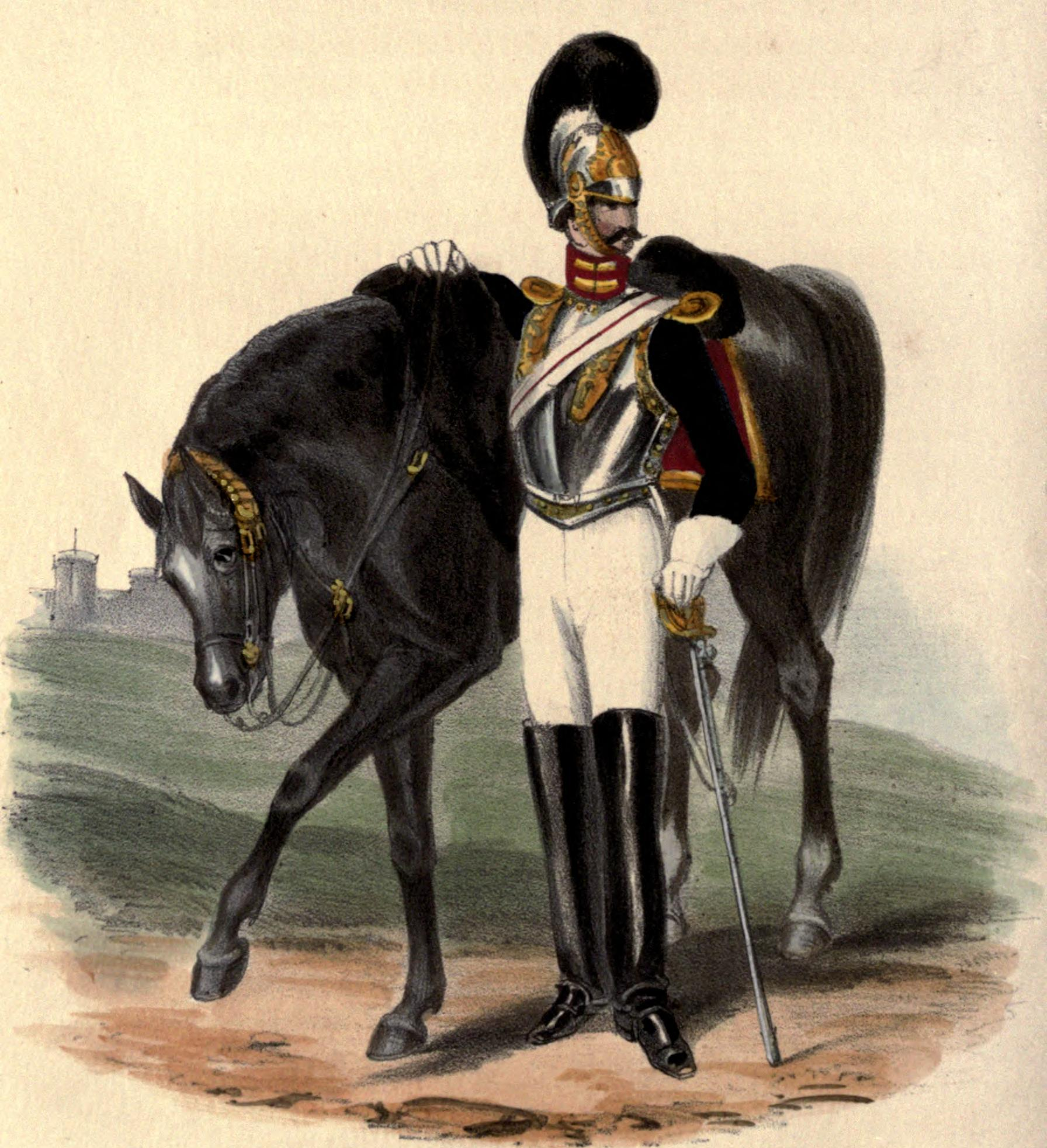
1828 illustration of a regimental trooper

The Prince Regent made himself Colonel-in-Chief of Life Guards and The Blues on becoming king on 29 January 1820. The Blues pay remained lower. They rotated between Windsor, Regent's Park and Knightsbridge from 1821. On 24 October 1818, The Gold Sticks were ordered to cut 104 men from The Blues – they were to pick only the strongest, fittest and best appearance in the troops. At George IV's coronation on 19 July 1821, he ordered the Household Cavalry to wear cuirasses.

On 7 August 1821 only weeks after the coronation, from which she was excluded, Queen Caroline died, having first expressed her wish to be buried in her native Brunswick. On 14 August, a squadron of The Blues arrived, led by Captain Bouverie to take her body to Romford. They pulled up at Brandenburgh House, Hammersmith to meet the local magistrate Sir Robert Baker. The mob planned to hijack the procession in the city, but when the hearse arrived to go through Hyde Park, the gates were slammed in their faces. The Life Guards came to their aid. The mob blocked Hyde Park Corner and Park Lane, so Baker had to change the route to Piccadilly. The cortege reached Tyburn Gate but it was barricaded. The Life Guards were involved in containing the violence, whilst the Blues still faced escorting through hostile crowds of belligerent Londoners.

In January 1830, The Blues' entire regiment escorted the funeral cortege for George IV to St George's Chapel, Windsor Castle, doing homage to a grateful king.

=== The Colonels-in-chief ===
Even in 1780 roughly half all officers were from middle-class backgrounds, and this hardly changed throughout the Imperial era. It was only among the general class and the cavalry more widely did the landed families succeed to commissions from their more rural hinterlands. Even in the 20th century the horsemanship of hunters drew them naturally to cavalry elites, which was accentuated by the dominance of those public school-educated officers in the Indian army. Rising professionalism meant a better educated, trained and equipped cavalry in late 19th and 20th centuries increasingly drew officers from London and the southern counties.

RHG and Aristocratic Officer Class
Date	% Landed class
1780	6
1810	3
1830	15
1852	27
1875	33
1930	30
1952	9
1962	14

Wellington was the first Blues Gold Stick and was colonel of The Blues until 1827. This put the regiment on a similar parity with Life Guards in terms of access to the king. The Duke, however, did not believe in bucking the chain of command, and declined to exercise extraordinary influence outside the fact that The Blues had become part of the Household Cavalry on 29 January 1820. Wellington did approve of the appointment of Stapleton Cotton, 1st Viscount Combermere to the Life Guards, but when the Duke of York died in 1827, the Iron Duke was finally made commander-in-chief. When Wellington became colonel of the Grenadier Guards (previously 1st Foot Guards) he was made to give up the Gold Stick. His successor was Ernest, Duke of Cumberland. The royal Duke believed the Gold Sticks-in-waiting should have absolute authority over their regiments. But the old Duke of Northumberland had resigned over this very issue and the new King William IV had the last word. He ruled that in all operational matters beyond ceremonial duties, the Household Cavalry would fall into the Commander-in-chief's care and command. Cumberland angrily resigned in a huff.

The youngest of the three Hill brothers, Clement Hill who had been Rowland Hill, 1st Viscount Hill's ADC, now the colonel of The Blues, became commanding officer. The trend was moving towards choosing operational commanders as colonel who would be fit for active service. To that end General Lord Hill, while Commander-in-Chief ordered that a cricket ground be built adjacent to every barracks. Queen Victoria in 1837 strongly approved of a policy of meritorious promotion. In 1842 she selected Henry Paget, 1st Marquess of Anglesey to succeed Hill as colonel of The Blues.

=== Soldiers' well-being ===
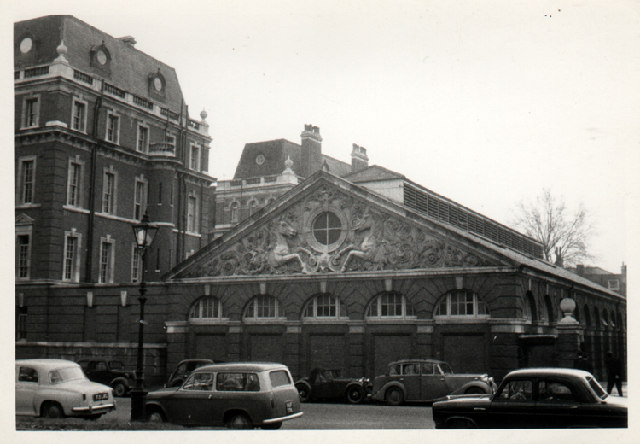
Knightsbridge Barracks before demolition

The cost of commissions for The Blues were broadly the same as Life Guards. But the costs of uniforms, horses and mess bills meant a private income was essential. India was the only opportunity for active service. But Household officers did not often want to transfer there. One Blues officer, Captain Hugh Duncan Baillie kept his mistress, Lady Glintworth in Clarence Crescent. But the quality of life for officers, and their level of pay differed markedly with NCO's. In Windsor, the soldiers were by mid-century living in chronically overcrowded rooms. They slept on straw palliases, and there was no running water, nor private bathrooms. The transmission of disease became epidemic at Knightsbridge Barracks, because there was not proper toilet paper. A report into the health of the Indian establishment concluded:

... by directing attention to the diet, clothing, lodging, exercise, and to the metal and moral improvement of the troops.

Officers in the Royal Horse Guards had the lowest casualty rate per 1,000 of mean strength only 9.5 in the first half of 19th century. By contrast, in Bengal, men's deaths were 73.8 and officers 30.5, still more than three times higher. The Report's authors estimated that of 9.5, 5.4 of those lives could have been saved but for terrible conditions in England's barracks:

... the officers of HM regiments who are serving in India possess comforts and conveniences which their comrades enjoy in no other part of the empire, not even in England

It took the revelations during the Crimean War for army reforms to introduce changes. Dr Cosmo Gordon Logie was the crusading Medical Officer, of The Blues, who wrote an article condemning some barracks as unfit for human habitation.

=== Troubles in the Crimea ===
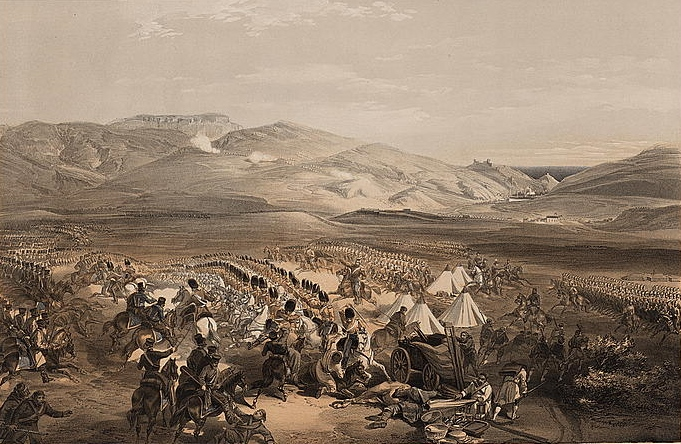
Charge of the heavy cavalry brigade, October 1854

FitzRoy Somerset, 1st Baron Raglan was colonel of The Blues when he sailed for the Crimea in 1854. He had lost an arm at Waterloo, and was a successful Staff Officer on the Peninsula. But at age sixty-five, he had not led an operational army. He was brave, charming, but incompetent. He jumped in the mess when the French arrived, forgetting that they were allies. Horse Guards had thought a Transport Corps unnecessary, and now men lay dying of cholera through lack of provision for fresh food, and clean water. Moreover, all the horses were dying from glanders.

The regiment played a key role in the Battle of Balaclava in October 1854. Sir Colin Campbell commanding the Highland Brigade, reinforced by Raglan's infantry, at 5 am had heard the Russian General Pavel Liprandi was moving 25,000 cavalry in 35 squadrons forward to take the Allied positions in front of Sevastopol. At daybreak, Raglan left the Light Brigade under James Brudenell, 7th Earl of Cardigan in reserve, whilst going with General James Yorke Scarlett's Heavy Brigade and horse artillery to meet the Russian move. The Russian cannon decimated the Allied horses. They successfully occupied the redoubts before launching an attack on the British positions at Balaclava. The horse artillery did return fire, but since the heavy horses had been sent back for supplies, there was no way of getting more ammunition. The 93rd Highlanders stood in a "thin red line" as the Russian Hussars charged down on towards them. The British waited until the last minute to give the order to fire. Almost upon the bayonets, the Russians wheeled first left and then right before disappearing towards their own lines. The Heavy Brigade of Scots Greys, Inniskillings, Dragoons and Blues were formed up by Scarlett as the black looking mass of 2,000 Russian Hussars and Lancers appeared over the hill. 300 of them charged the Russian lines and despite being heavily outnumbered managed to push the Russians back. Casualties were relatively light on both sides. This action was a relative success in contrast to the Light Brigade's charge against artillery led by George Bingham, 3rd Earl of Lucan. By January 1856, the cavalry had managed to construct small wooden huts, and life slowly began to improve.

=== The Cardwell Reforms ===
Before the war in 1853, the sandy land near and around Aldershot was acquired by the War Office. When the Cavalry returned some of the regiments were sent back to that town. A permanent camp was ordered to be established here after the war. More garrisons were established at Colchester in Essex, Shorncliffe in Kent, and the Curragh in County Kildare, Ireland. From 1868 Edward Cardwell began a series of significant Liberal government reforms to the War Office and the army. He faced considerable opposition from Prince George, Duke of Cambridge, Commander-in-chief. Cardwell's reforms were impactful for a generation. One important change was abolition of the purchase system. Cambridge led a spirited defence of it in parliament.

From 1850 to 1899, 39 peers' sons served in The Blues: the highest concentration in the regiment's history (77 in Life Guards). John Brocklehurst was the son of Henry Brocklehurst, a successful Macclesfield silk miller, who went on to be a major-general. It was typical of industrial classes 'in trade' to be contributing to the ranks of The Blues.

=== A Nile Expeditionary Force ===
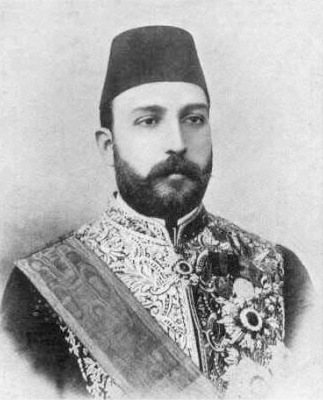
Khedive Tawfiq

In an 1871 speech to the Commons, Captain Talbot MP hinted that due to the success of German Uhlans in defeating the French heavy cavalry in the recent Franco-Prussian War, the era of heavy cavalry was over. He urged a radical solution of scrapping them as they were too costly to the Exchequer at £100 per man. Talbot also pointed out that a cavalryman was on duty almost twice per every week, and in fact as to the allegations of drunkenness, the Guards were a very disciplined soldiery. He quoted the Duke of Cambridge that the guards were the flower of the imperial army.

The ‘Urabi Revolt was provoked by the overthrow of Khedive Tewfik Pasha in Cairo, and the massacre of the British residents of Alexandria. The Life Guards lobbied for a return to the Waterloo system of a composite regimental system; one regimental battalion doing ceremonial duties, the other operational. The Adjutant-General to the Forces and colonel of The Blues in a famous letter of 7 July 1882 explained to Horse Guards that they could raise 450 officers and men for the Egyptian expedition, and that a squadron from each of the Household regiments would make up the force. This consisted of the two Life Guards squadrons and The Blues squadron. They were led by Lieutenant-colonel Milne Home. As the Duke of Cambridge remarked in his diary on August 1, 1882 – "Went by special train to the Albert Docks to see 1st Life Guards and half the Royal Horse Guards embark in the Holland. Mr Childers went with me. All passed off well. Men in excellent spirits, and ship good and roomy". As they departed Southampton Water under the overall command of Sir Garnet Wolseley, they sent thanks to the Queen at Osborne House. On 24 August the Household Cavalry were in action for the first time. They took the towns of El Magfar, "the Household troops made a fine charge with great success" on 16 August, Mahsamah. At Kassassin Lock Graham held his own "till the Cavalry came up and under Lowe, by moonlight, made a brilliant charge, destroying all before them, riding over 12 guns and entirely routing the Egyptians".

They were very short of food, and it was very hot. The huge British cavalrymen and horses towered over their enemy. They carried razor-sharp sabres on the 1848 steel pattern, Martini–Henry carbines, and pistols. There was a false alarm before the cavalry saw action at Mahsamah, charging 'Urabi infantry, who were supported by cannon. "Then the cheer we gave, then the few seconds of silence, and then the havoc and slaughter.". The Blues on the left "For the first few minutes it looked as if they meant to shoot us down; and then it was our men's turn to butcher them." (John Brocklehurst).

By 12 September 1882, Wolseley was prepared enough to plan an attack on the strongly fortified Tell El Kebir. The British had 13,000 troops and 70 guns. Wolseley planned a surprise night march and a dawn raid. On the 13th at 5 am they attacked with the Household Cavalry on the right rolling up the flank, causing panic in the Egyptian ranks. They rode 60 miles in 24 hours, reaching Cairo the following day. On 20 October The Blues landed on board the Lydian Monarch to a triumphal reception at Southampton. They processed amidst cheering crowds towards Regent's Park Barracks. The Queen was relieved Prince Arthur, Duke of Connaught and Strathearn had returned. Both Victoria and the Prince of Wales, who was temporarily staying at Bad Homburg wrote the regiments with congratulations On 21 October Cambridge went to Regent's Park Barracks to inspect the Squadron of the Blues. The men looked thin but in perfect health, and for the horses, though ragged, looked quite fit for work, and better than I expected". And on 25 October they were entertained to a banquet at the old Holborn Town Hall, while they stayed at Knightsbridge Barracks.

In 1884 Muhammad Ahmad, a tribal leader claiming to be the Prophet Mahdi, led a nationalist rising. General William Hicks defeated the Mahdi's troops at Kurdufan in October 1883. But Valentine Baker was defeated by the Mahdi's General Osman Digna near Suakin. An expedition by General Gerald Graham from Cairo won two victories at El-Teb (February 1884) and Tamai (March 1884). Wolseley was called upon to rescue General Charles George Gordon from Khartoum. But the loss of Suakin made it impossible to execute operations on the River Nile. Wolseley took the radical step of forming a Camel Corps from the Household Cavalry regiments and The Royals totalling 200 hand-picked men. He also picked a light Guards regiment as infantry. They had left Aldershot via Southampton for Alexandria by 24 September, travelling down the Nile to Aswan, and thence by Camel they reached the great bend in the Nile by Christmas. The Blues were led by a renowned officer, Fred Burnaby. (Note: At 6 ft tall, and 20 st he was very strong, a weightlifter. Joined the Blues in 1859, paying £1,250 for a Cornet's commission. He achieved fame by travelling to Khiva in the Russian Steppes. From "forbidden" Khiva, he went to Bulgaria campaigning with his friend Valentine Baker. He was involved in the Carlist revolt of army officers in Spain. He crossed the channel by balloon.) The Times reported on Gordon's plight, and Burnaby was their reporter in the Sudan. (Note: He stood in Birmingham as a Conservative against Joseph Chamberlain. Some officers complained that their extra marital affairs were being made public: but Burnaby was admired by the men in the regiment.) In 1884 Burnaby was wounded at El Teb. But the public were dismayed to learn that he had fought in 'civvies' armed with a shot-gun. Leading the charge over the ramparts, blasting his shot-gun as he went, he was wounded in the arm, but rescued by a Highlander.

Wolseley detached the Camel Corps under Sir Herbert Stewart to march across the desert to Metemma, securing the wells at Jakdul on 12 January 1885. Having learnt how to handle camels in the saddle, they were expected to employ carbines and full kit as mounted infantry. They then had to secure more wells, and eventually encountering on foot, the enemy at Abu Klea, where 700 Mahdists charged them. The Gardner machine-gun jammed. They formed a defensive square, during which hand-to-hand fighting Burnaby fell, defended to the last by Corporal Mackintosh, who was killed. George Baillie-Hamilton, Lord Binning, the regiment's signalling officer, crept out twice to give Burnaby water. Wave after wave of Baggara tribesmen mounted on black chargers rushed their positions, falling on volleys of rifle fire. The tactics of the square at Abu Klea exhausted the Mahdi's best troops, who fell at that battle. Major Lord Arthur Somerset of The Blues squadron wrote commanding officer to inform him of the heroic actions. On the second occasion Burnaby had been speared. In total 9 Officers and 65 men were killed, 94 wounded in the Heavy Camel Regiment, but only one killed and four from disease among NCOs and ranks.

As the British made their way to the Nile they were constantly harassed, exhausted and thirsty. As they boarded boats Sir Herbert was killed; and his Intelligence Officer to whom command was devolved dithered. Sir Charles Wilson reached Metemma on 19 January but was not able to repair down the Nile; Gordon was killed and Khartoum taken on 26 January 1885. A tribute to their heroic commanding officer was written by Private Cameron, The Blues:

The soldier's friend, the best of men; Beloved of all his corps; So mourn you Royal Horse Guards Blues; Brave Burnaby no more.

== Twentieth century warfare ==
=== Second Boer War ===
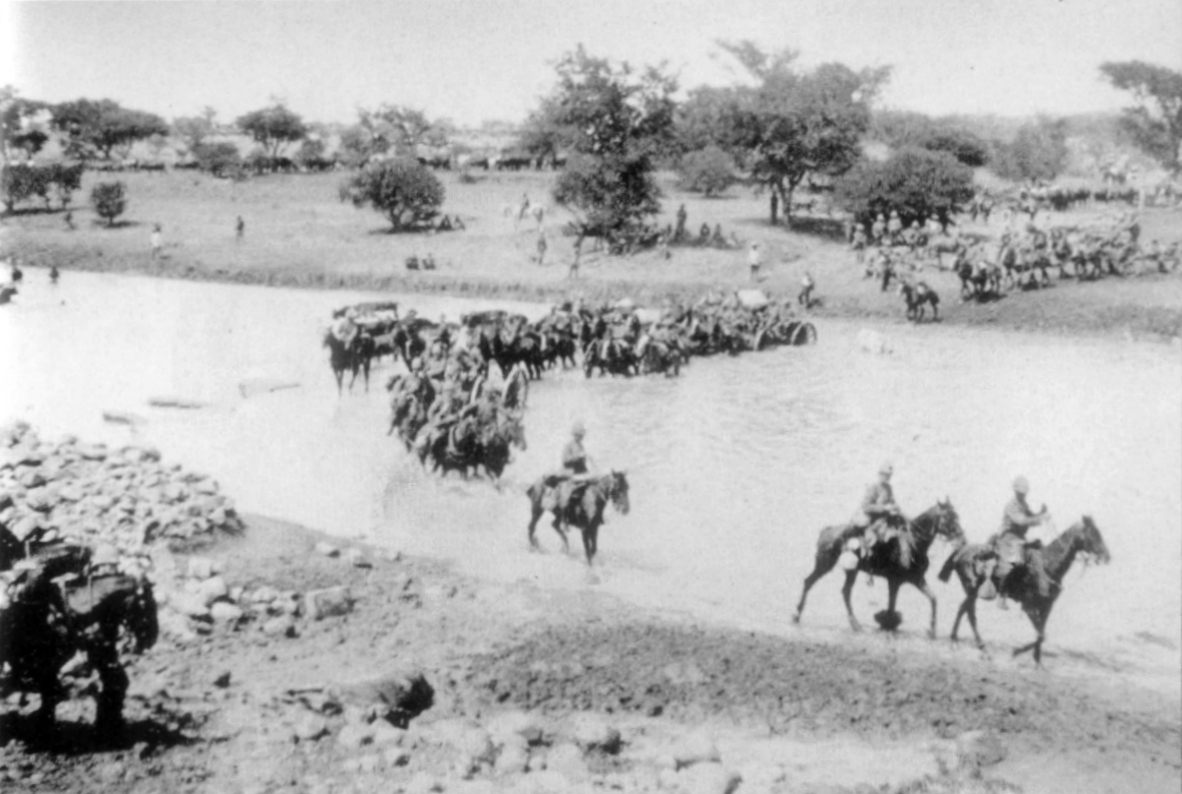
British Cavalry crossing the Tugela River in 1899

Since being made colonel of the Blues, Lord Wolseley took great care to ask the Queen permission to send a squadron from each of the three Household regiments to South Africa. In total 35,000 men left, a corps, trained at Aldershot in summer 1899 making it a foregone conclusion, they thought of a quick victory. Many of the leading officers were aristocrats. The Tugela River posed a natural boundary to the Boer republics to the north. Sir George White had unwisely tried to defend a line on a broad front, that was easily outflanked. The Boers had occupied British towns in the Cape Colony and Natal. When Redvers Buller's expedition arrived in Cape Town Harbour in December 1899, his 30,000 troops faced a well-organized guerilla kommando of 40,000 Boer farmers. He appointed Douglas Cochrane, 12th Earl of Dundonald and Lieutenant-Colonel John Burn-Murdoch as commanders of the two cavalry brigades. The Blues found their horses were exhausted when they arrived off the train at Rensburg, near Colesberg.

Date	Total RHG	Total Household
1841	434	
1 July 1897	406	1234
1 October 1897	403	1230
1 January 1898	405	1233

(Note: at any one time there 30 or 40 under age and trainees who were ineligible for effective service leaving a total of 70 out but no reserve.)

On 7 January 1900 while out on patrol one officer and four men were taken prisoner by a Kommando. On 2 February they departed Rensburg at 2 pm for perfect cavalry veldt around the Modder River, where they encamped. At 11 am on 7 February, the Household Cavalry Regiment, including Royal Horse Guards horses, exhausted from the train journey, charged the Boers at Koedoesberg, manned a fence where two troopers were wounded in action. The following day the Household Cavalry Regiment left came by 10.30 am with the Blues in the advance party, rifle skirmishing with the enemy. They remained in the advance guard of Sir John French's Cavalry Division. Three days later on 11 February they were brigaded with 10th Royal Hussars and 11th Lancers under Brigadier Robert Broadwood. That morning at 3 am they had made a great "Cavalry Rush for Kimberley", using General French's swift tactics outmanoeuvring the enemy to arrive at Ramdan. On 17 February the regiment lost twenty horses from heat exhaustion. At the Battle of Ostfontein Lord Roberts could report "The fighting was practically confined to the Cavalry Division, which as usual did exceedingly well."

Ambushed by 300 Boers at Sanna's Post, where Broadwood's exhausted men were under canvas at 4.30 am on 31 March they into a trap: completely outnumbered by a combined force of 5,000 Boers. At 6 am General Christiaan de Wet shelled Broadwood's encampment, before they broke and marched into an enfolding trap; sending two batteries ahead to fall into the waiting Boers lap at the Koornspruit. Only the witness of two highly experienced Brigade majors saved them. 3 miles upstream Lieutenant-Colonel Fenwick and the Blues dashed down Waterval Drift towards the spruit under heavy Boer cross-fire; Lieutenant Meade was wounded. The spring rain brought flooding to the Blues bivouacs. Later that month Colonel Thomas Pilcher's retreat was covered by a Blues squadron and battery.

Composite Household Cavalry Regiment reinforcements consisting of two officers and 20 troopers drawn from all three Household regiments, under 1st Life Guards command had arrived at Bloemfontein on 20 April for a well earned rest, while the Blues were still bivouacked. The Blues under Sir John French were left on the road: the line of retreat was blocked by de Wet, who moved to cut off the convoys sent along the Thaba Nchu-Bloemfontein Road. Still in Broadwood's brigade, the Household Cavalry Regiment marched to Krantz Kraal to join an infantry brigade and divisional commander Major-General Ian Hamilton who marched on 30 April. During the night 4th Cavalry brigade was sent up as reinforcement and the Boers now heavily outnumbered by Broadwoood on the flank, beat a hasty retreat on 1 May, but not before inflicting heavy casualties on the cavalry. These brilliant marches covered hundreds of miles, such as the latter from Kaalfontein to Blesberg. But the next month another 300 miles would be traversed interspersed with episodic periods of fierce fighting. On 3 May Broadwood despatched a squadron led by Arthur Gore, Viscount Sudley, a captain in the Royal Horse Guards to gallop to exploit between two converging enemy forces of 4,000 and 1,000 men respectively over the Brandfort Ridge through a gauntlet of fire left and right. Lieutenant Rose was a casualty. The decisive action drove off the Boer infantry and enabled Broadwood to capture Welkom Farm on the Vet River the following day. Charles Wyndham, also a lieutenant, attached to the Blues, but initially a Life Guard was wounded in the skirmish at Kopje. (Note: ironically his brother Lieutenant Adrian Rose was on his way out to join him.) On 10 May the Blues detachment under Colonel Fenwick bivouacked in the east of Ventersburg township, Two days later French's Winburg Column was able wheel round to capture the Boer HQ at Kroonstad with 1st and 4th Cavalry brigades. On 5 June the Household Cavalry Regiment occupied Poort north of Pretoria in an advanced position ahead of brigade. Roberts and Hamilton insisted on an arduous march in which the army lost 9,000 men, falling disproportionately on the Cavalry who lost 30% of their strength in 34 days.

Lieutenant-General French's command
Commander	Brigade no.	First Unit	Second Unit	Third Unit
Babington, Porter, Gordon	1st Mobile	Life Guards		4th Hussars
Burn-Murdoch	1st Natal			
Broadwood	2nd	HCR	10th Hussars	12th Lancers
Dundonald	2nd or 3rd Natal			
Brocklehurst	2nd Natal			
Gordon, Little	3rd		9th Lancers	
Dundonald	3rd Natal Mounted	Royal Dragoons	13th Hussars	14th Hussars
Dickson	4th			
Roberts	4th			

On 15 August racing at top speed with the Household Cavalry Regiment Lord Kitchener caught the Boers at Elands Camp in the middle of the night, relieving the besieged town of Brakfontein in an expert cavalry manoeuvre; they relieved again at Banks Station a week later, before marching on to Krugersdorp. The enemy's operations around Pretoria were abandoned by the time the Household Cavalry Regiment entered the city on 30 August having traversed 1,200 miles in four months.

During September 1900 the cavalry were involved in chasing down the Boer General de Wet's army. They held the pass at Olifant's Nek in the Magaliesberg mountains, just as Lord Kitchener was about to encircle and finish off the enemy's force of 2,600 Boer kommando. But Major-General Sir Ian Hamilton ordered them to leave their positions and de Wet escaped. In his journal, Captain Meade exonerated Major-General Hamilton for any blame attached to de Wet's escape through Olifant's Nek, where he hid out in the mountains until returning southwards weeks later. Broadwood left the command on 19 October thanking them for all their 'hard work', "they always did well anything I asked them to do...."

The brigade was stationed to Rustenberg on September, where Colonel Fenwick was named commandant. Boer convoys in the district were rounded up, vast supplies were seized at Kaffirs Kraal and, taken to the town, where food was distributed. Sweeping north Broadwood closed the gap in the line meeting Clements at Commando Nek. At last the call came for the regiment to move to Pretoria ready for disembarkation. At the end of October they entrained for Cape Town, bound for Southampton on the Hawarden Castle. The Blues returned on 30 November to their barracks at Regent's Park. Meanwhile, in India, the lifestyle of soldiers had changed little since the Cardwell reforms. And the pay in 1910, for example, for a lieutenant was still only £230 per annum, whereas the average mess bill was £300. The common ground lay in the fact that officers men were drawn largely from agricultural communities.

In a famous judgement known as the Esher Award, Reginald Brett, 2nd Viscount Esher, Master of the Rolls, awarded precedence to the Household Cavalry over the Foot Guards (Grenadier Guards), although their colonel was known as "in brigade waiting", Esher found for the cavalry. The matter was then passed to Conservative Lord Chancellor Hardinge Giffard, 1st Earl of Halsbury who decided it was up to the King.

=== First World War ===
==== Mobilisation ====
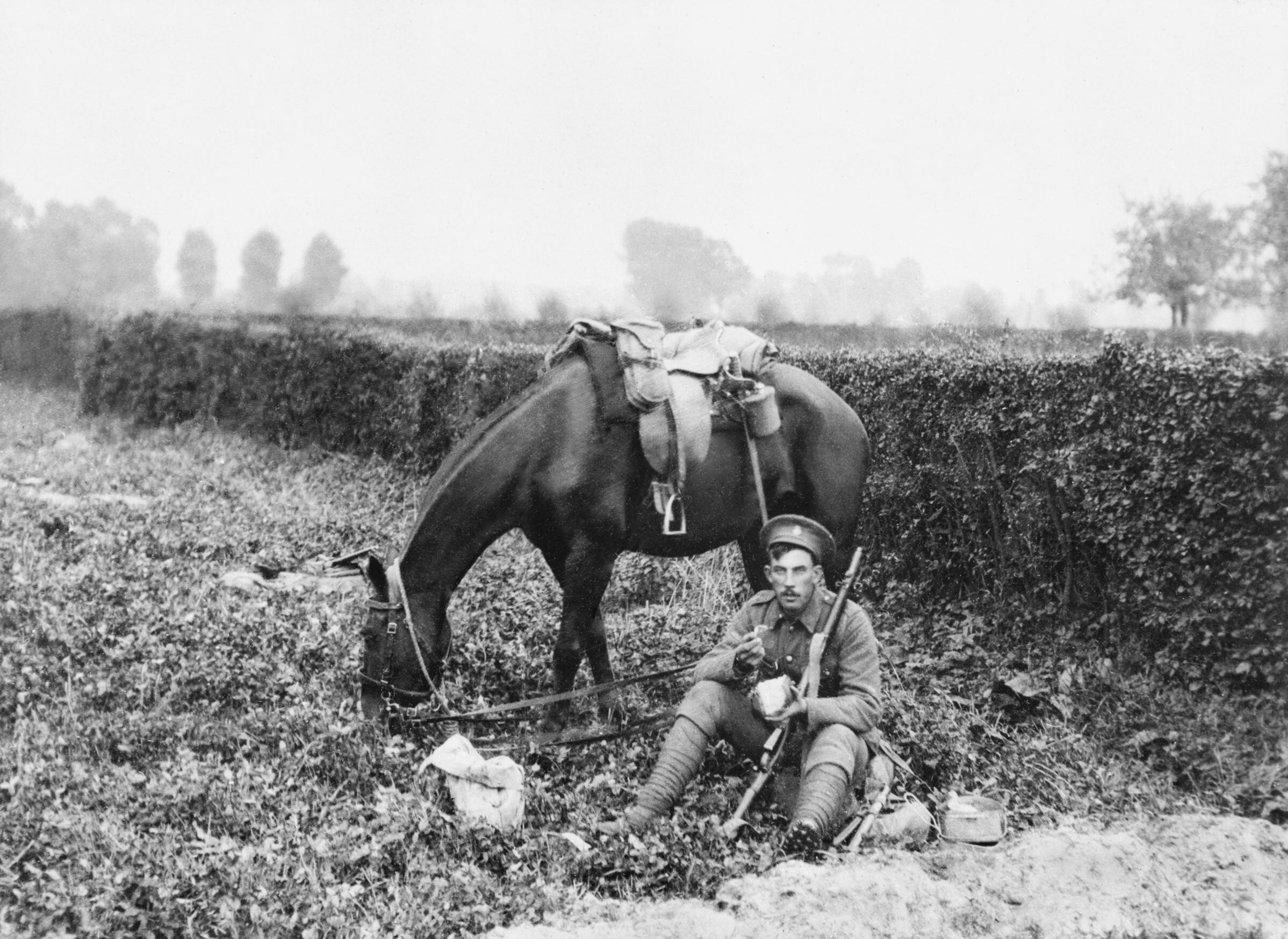
British cavalryman in Belgium, 13 October 1914

When war broke out the regiment was at Combermere Barracks, Windsor (renamed after Clewer was demolished and rebuilt). One squadron came under the order of the Household Cavalry Composite Regiment. The regiment landed at Zeebrugge as part of the 7th Cavalry Brigade in the 3rd Cavalry Division in October 1914 for service on the Western Front.

On 30 October the Blues were operating in the zone around the village of Zanvoorde when the Germans attacked. On 20 November the Cavalry Corps had joined up with Edmund Allenby's Division in the Ypres Salient, a front line that went east of Zonnebeke, around Polygon Wood, over the Menin Road (the road from Ypres to Menin) and then west of Zanvoorde towards Wytchaete and Messines. From whence the Composite regiment (Life Guards 1 and 2) resisted an offensive on 31 October. A French cavalry brigade was sent east of Hooge as a dismounted detachment in support of 7th Cavalry Brigade at 5 pm. The action had begun on 25 October when the Blues staging a daring operation covered the retreat of 20th Infantry brigade, on horseback. They galloped out to draw German shell fire. On 21 November the Royal Horse Guards were moved to the 8th Cavalry Brigade, which had only been formed the previous day. On 26 December 1914, Sir Douglas Haig, a cavalry officer, took command of the 1st Army.

Table showing the structural disposition of Royal Horse Guards
Unit	Commander	Dates
3rd Cavalry Division	Major General Julian Byng	1914
7th Cavalry Brigade	Brigadier Charles Kavanagh	1914
Royal Horse Guards	Lt-Col Gordon Chesney Wilson (killed in action)	1911-6 Nov 1914
Royal Horse Guards	Lt-Col Lord Tweedmouth	Nov 1914-Feb 1922
Royal Horse Guards	Hugh Dawney (k-i-a)	Oct 1914-Nov 1914
8th Cavalry Brigade	Brig Charles Bulkeley Bulkeley-Johnson	Nov 1914-Apr 1917
8th Cavalry Brigade	Brig A Seymour	Apr 1917 - Mar 1918
2nd Cavalry Division	Maj Gen Hubert Gough	Aug 1914 -
4th Cavalry Brigade	Cecil Edward Bingham	Aug 1914 - May 1915
Composite Regiments	Lt-Col T J J Torie	Nov 1914-Jan 1915
Composite Regiments	Lt-Col Algernon Francis Holford Ferguson	Jan 1915-May 1915
Composite Regiments	Lt-Col Thomas George Jameson Torie	May 1915-Dec 1915
Composite Regiments	Lt-Col Ferguson	Dec 1915-Jan 1916
Composite Regiments	Lt-Col Torie	Jan 1916-June 1916
Composite Regiments	Lt-Col A F Stanley	June 1916 – 1920

In 1916 a Welshman, Colwyn Philipps, a captain of the Blues, was killed in action. Shortly afterwards his poetry was released by Rupert Brooke. His simple prosody such as "An Outsider" and "A friend" and "Sesame and Lilies", said to be in the style of Robert Browning, were symbolic of an innocence of youth on horseback cut down in his prime, lost to his father.

==== Machine Gun Regiment ====
On 7 November 1917 the Blues were moved back to 7th Cavalry Brigade, as one of the few regiments that remained mounted. In February 1918 it was decided to reduce the cavalry by two divisions, to just three divisions. The two former Indian army cavalry divisional corps were sent from France to the Middle Eastern front, and 3rd Cavalry Division was extensively reorganized. One cavalry division in France was disbanded altogether. The decision was taken to convert the Yeomanry regiment and Household Cavalry into battalions of the Guards Machine Gun Regiment. They would be posted to the pillboxes that peppered the landscape along the trench front, once trained at Camiers Machine Gun School, north of Etaples. Haig remarked "They seemed a splendid lot of officers..." They were "selected officers" chosen as skilled and experienced soldiers tasked to stop an en masse onslaught of German Stormtroopers. They were inserted with the intention of causing minimum disruption to the infantry of the line regiments. In March 1918 the 3rd Cavalry division moved to 1st Army. Field Marshal Haig was the old commander of his 1st Army Corps, whose own experience of cavalry regiments in South Africa and India regarded the Household Cavalry as more ceremonial and over-privileged:

The 7th Cavalry Brigade is composed of 3 Household Cavalry Regiments Kavanagh says it is a weakness in the Division; the men are very heavy and use up a large number of horses; also these regiments are not getting as good officers as the others. Kavanagh wishes the regiments set free from the Indian cavalry Division to be organized as a brigade to replace the Household regiments. The latter to be reduced to one Composite regiments as was the case at the beginning of the war.

Lieutenant-General Sir Charles Kavanagh wrote about the changes although he regretted them, when he had advocated the move to machine guns. Colonel of the Blues, Sir Evelyn Wood, wrote to Kavanagh: "You can picture my pleasant thoughts when I contrast the spirit of the Blues turning to the duties of Machine Gunners, and the false swagger of the men ... in the Light Dragoons".

In March 1918, the Germans broke through Hubert Gough's Fifth Army lines and penetrated at least 5 miles, for the first time since 1914. It was clear the Allied offensive would soon follow the faltering German advance, the 3rd Cavalry Division moved to the 1st Army, just as it was about to be dismounted. (Note: 10 March 1918, Household Cavalry was dismounted and as battalions; Blues were no.3 Guards Machine Gun Regiment) On 3 March, Field Marshal Haig had written to Kavanagh explaining that:

The situation with regard to manpower has made it necessary to convert to other uses certain units now in the field, and in consequence, the Army Council, with the consent of His Majesty the King, have issued orders that the three Household Cavalry Regiments are to be dismounted and converted into Army Machine Gun Battalions. I feel confident that since this reorganization has become necessary, it will be accepted with the loyalty and devotion with which every turn of fortune has been met by British Officers and men throughout the war, and that the Household Cavalry regiments will in their new role as Machine Gun Battalions maintain their old esprit de corps and add further honours to their very distinguished record. On the eve of the change, I wish to express to all belonging to these regiments my admiration of the fine services they have rendered since the beginning of the war.

At Villeselve some horsemen from the Royals, Dragoon Guards and 10th Hussars saw some infantry in the sunken lanes "The Germans had taken up what positions they could in the open", and wheeling round made, what was the last cavalry manoeuvre of its kind in Europe. As many as 70–100 enemy soldiers were killed by sabres. In 1918 the regiment remounted on horses and were part of Edmund Allenby's army in Palestine mainly engaged in reconnaissance. On 20 May 1918, Haig went to see Major General Cyril Deverell commanding 3rd Division, who complained of the lack of trained officers for battalion and company commanders in the fighting south of Arras and north of the Lys.

==== Hundred days ====
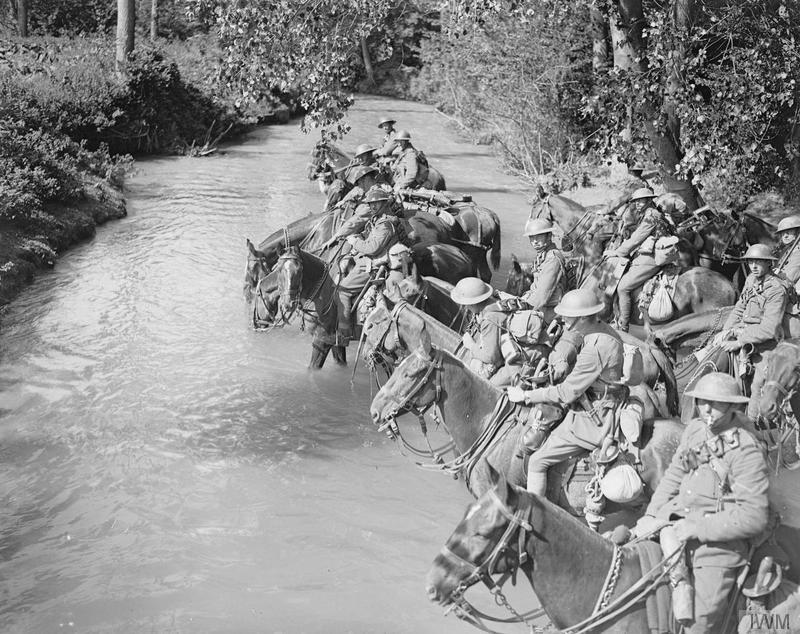
British Cavalry in France, 17 September 1918

On 8 August 1918, Haig's "100 Days" began in front of Amiens when he ordered the attack that by the time of the Armistice had taken the allies to the German border. But cavalry actions were heavily restricted due to the crater-pocked landscape of shell holes lined with barbed wire presenting "a death trap" to horses. White-Spunner calls the offensive "one of the most sophisticated ever mounted by the British Army, which saw for the first time the coordinated use of tanks, aircraft, cavalry and infantry". In the past Haig had not got along with Sir Henry Wilson, but in the Hundred Days and later, Wilson was effusive in his praise of the Commander-in-Chief. As well as greater care shown to troops, the Great War years were most innovative of new technology, one of the most significant being the Stokes mortar. As early as Spring 1916, Haig was using cavalry in a sophisticated way, as part of an all-arms striking force, and in the looser warfare of the Hundred Days cavalry was an indispensable part of his range of resources.

The Blues were located on the Sambre–Oise Canal and, on 4 November the last major British offensive took place. It was foggy weather enabling the men to get across the canal unseen along high hedged lanes. With no Germans to hold them back, all the reserves being committed, the attack advanced without further resistance. On 5 November, Haig offered Julian Byng and Henry Rawlinson Cavalry Corps to be used in an advance in the direction of Maubeuge, but they both refused. The French however, the following day were much more positive about using cavalry to force the River Scheldt. On 9 November, William Birdwood's Fifth Army cavalry received orders to cross the Scheldt, as the enemy was in full retreat. As the speed of advance accelerated more cavalry was required to join battle. On 11 November at 11 am Haig had a meeting with all commanders at Cambrai, including General Kavanagh, when the Armistice already signed at 5 am, actually came into force. One Blues officer spoke of their emotional sentiments when finally the Armistice was called – and the silence.

=== Inter-War Years ===
On 10 February 1919 the household cavalry was reorganized and permanently stationed in London throughout the inter-war period. On 22 March 1919, the Household Cavalry in drab khaki, marched past King George V at Buckingham Palace. On 19 April a requiem was held at Westminster Abbey. The 1st Life Guards went to Knightsbridge Barracks, the 2nd Life Guards were at Combermere Barracks, and the Blues were sent to Regent's Park Barracks. In May 1921, they adopted the old rotation system again, but it only lasted for one year and they were back to permanent barracks. As memories of the war melted away, the regiments lost their separate identities in civilian life. In the reorganisations that followed the First World War, the 1st Life Guards and the 2nd Life Guards were amalgamated as "The Life Guards (1st and 2nd)" in 1922. Lord Allenby was colonel of 1st Life Guards and Sir Cecil Edward Bingham was colonel of the 2nd Life Guards. This arrangement continued until the regiment was renamed "The Life Guards" in 1928.

The two Household regiments rotated the barracks between Combermere Barracks and Regent's Park barracks, and then when Regent's Park Barracks became too cramped, from 1932, between Combermere Barracks and Knightsbridge Barracks. In 1938 the Household Cavalry were ordered to Palestine still mounted as cavalry and still actively engaged in ceremonial duties but did not arrive in Palestine until 1939.

=== Second World War ===
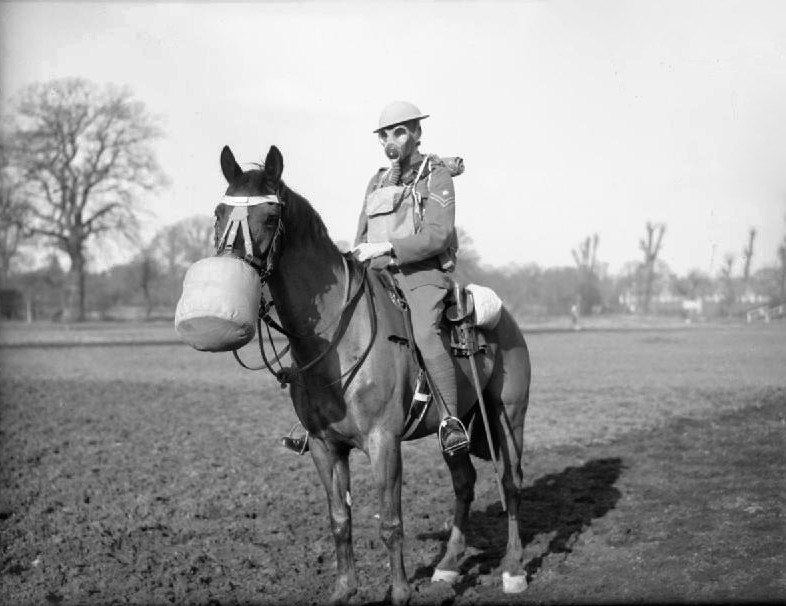
A mounted corporal of the Household Cavalry Regiment wearing a gas mask, Windsor, 1939

The Blues were at Windsor when war was declared on 3 September 1939. That month, The Life Guards and Royal Horse Guards formed the Household Cavalry Composite Regiment and the Household Cavalry Training Regiment. The Household Cavalry Composite Regiment, which saw action in Palestine, Iraq and North Africa, disbanded in 1945 and the personnel returned to their original units.

=== Post-war ===
After the war the Royal Horse Guards was based at Brühl in Germany and only moved back to Combermere Barracks in March 1952. It deployed to Cyprus in February 1956, returned to Combermere Barracks in May 1959 and then moved to Harewood Barracks in Herford in October 1962. It returned to Combermere Barracks again in June 1966 and transferred to Hobart Barracks in Detmold in November 1968. The regiment amalgamated with the Royal Dragoons (1st Dragoons) to form the Blues and Royals (Royal Horse Guards and 1st Dragoons) in 1969.

== Battle honours ==
The regiment's battle honours were as follows:

- Early Wars: Battle of Sedgemoor, Flanders Campaigns 1742–43, 1745, Culloden, Dettingen, Fontenoy, Warburg, Emsdorf, Villinghausen, Wilhelmstal, Beaumont, Willems, Peninsula, Waterloo, Tel-el-Kebir, Egypt 1882, Sudan 1884, South Africa 1899–1900: Relief of Kimberley, Paardeberg
- The Great War: Mons, Le Cateau, Retreat from Mons, Marne 1914, Aisne 1914, Messines 1914, Armentières 1914, Ypres 1914 '15 '17, Langemarck 1914, Gheluvelt, Nonne Bosschen, St Julien, Frezenberg, Loos, Arras 1917, Scarpe 1917, Broodseinde, Poelcappelle, Passchendaele, Hindenburg Line, Cambrai 1918, Sambre, France and Flanders 1914–18.
- The Second World War: Mont Pinçon, Souleuvre, Noireau Crossing, Amiens 1944, Brussels, Neerpelt, Nederrijn, Nijmegen, Lingen, Bentheim, Baghdad 1941, Iraq 1941, Palmyra, Syria 1941, El Alamein, North Africa 1942–43, Arezzo, Advance to Florence, Gothic Line, Italy 1944, North-West Europe 1944-45.

== Commanding officers ==
The Commanding Officers have been:

- Lt.-Col. William P. de Cerjat: January 1800 – May 1803
- Lt.-Col. Gordon Chesney Wilson: October 1911 – November 1914
- Lt.-Col. David de Crespigny Smiley: December 1951 – December 1954
- Lt.-Col. Julian Berry: March 1958 – March 1960
- Lt.-Col. David J. St. M. Tabor: March 1960 – June 1962
- Lt.-Col. Harry S. Hopkinson: June 1962 – December 1964
- Lt.-Col. Roy M. F. Redgrave: December 1964 – May 1967
- Lt.-Col. Mark A. Q. Darley: May 1967 – March 1969

== Colonels-in-Chief ==
The regiment's Colonels-in-Chief were as follows:

- 1831–1837: William IV
- 1880–1910: Edward VII
- 1910–1936: George V
- 1936: Edward VIII
- 1936–1952: George VI
- 1952–1969: Elizabeth II

== Colonels—with other names for the regiment ==
The regiment's colonels were as follows:

- 1650–1661: Sir Arthur Haselrig (from Haselrig's Regiment Regiment of Cuirassiers)
- 1661–1688: Aubrey de Vere, 20th Earl of Oxford (from de Vere's or Earl of Oxford's Regiment)
- 1688–1688: Field Marshal James FitzJames, 1st Duke of Berwick (from FitzJames's or Duke of Berwick's Regiment)
- 1688–1688: Lieutenant General James Hamilton, 4th Duke of Hamilton (from Duke of Hamilton's Regiment)
- 1688–1703: Aubrey de Vere, 20th Earl of Oxford (from de Vere's or Earl of Oxford's Regiment)
- 1703–1712: Lieutenant General George FitzRoy, 1st Duke of Northumberland (from FitzRoy's or Duke of Northumberland's Regiment)
- 1712–1712: General Richard Savage, 4th Earl Rivers (from Savage's or Earl Rivers' Regiment)
- 1712–1715: Charles Mordaunt, 3rd Earl of Peterborough (Mordaunt's or Earl of Peterborough's Regiment)
- 1715–1717: Field Marshal John Campbell, 2nd Duke of Argyll (from Campbell's or Duke of Argyll's Regiment)
- 1717–1735: Lieutenant General Charles Powlett, 3rd Duke of Bolton (from Powlett's or Marquis of Winchester's Regiment)
- 1735–1740: Field Marshal John Campbell, 2nd Duke of Argyll (from Campbell's or Duke of Argyll's Regiment)
- 1740–1742: General Algernon Seymour, 7th Duke of Somerset (from Seymour's or Earl of Hertford's Regiment)
- 1742: Field Marshal John Campbell, 2nd Duke of Argyll (from Campbell's or Duke of Argyll's Regiment)
- 1742–1750: General Algernon Seymour, 7th Duke of Somerset (from Seymour's or Earl of Hertford's or Duke of Somerset's Regiment)
  - from 1750: Royal Horse Guards Blue

On 1 July 1751 a royal warrant provided that in future regiments would not be known by their colonels' names, but by their "number or rank".

- Feb 1750 – Aug 1750: Field Marshal Charles Lennox, 2nd Duke of Richmond (from Lennox's or Richmond's Regiment)
- 1753–1758: Field Marshal John Ligonier, 1st Earl Ligonier
- 1758–1770: Field Marshal John Manners, Marquess of Granby
- 1770–1795: Field Marshal Henry Seymour Conway
- 1795–1806: Field Marshal Charles Lennox, 3rd Duke of Richmond
- 1806–1813: Lieutenant General Hugh Percy, 2nd Duke of Northumberland
- 1813–1827: Field Marshal Arthur Wellesley, 1st Duke of Wellington (as the first Blues Gold Stick)
- 1827–1830: Field Marshal Ernest Augustus, Duke of Cumberland & Teviotdale
- 1830–1842: General Rowland Hill, 1st Viscount Hill
- 1842–1854: Field Marshal Henry Paget, 1st Marquess of Anglesey
- 1854–1855: Field Marshal FitzRoy Somerset, 1st Baron Raglan
- 1855–1869: Field Marshal Hugh Gough, 1st Viscount Gough
- 1869–1885: Field Marshal Hugh Rose, 1st Baron Strathnairn
  - from 1877: Royal Horse Guards (The Blues)
- 1885–1895: Field Marshal Sir Patrick Grant
- 1895–1907: Field Marshal Garnet Wolseley, 1st Viscount Wolseley
- 1907–1919: Field Marshal Sir Evelyn Wood
- 1919–1928: Field Marshal Douglas Haig, 1st Earl Haig
- 1928–1933: Field Marshal Sir William Robertson, 1st Baronet
- 1933–1951: Field Marshal William Birdwood, 1st Baron Birdwood
- 1951–1962: Major General Sir Richard Howard-Vyse
- 1962–1969: Field Marshal Sir Gerald Templer

In 1969 the regiment amalgamated with the 1st The Royal Dragoons to form the Blues and Royals (Royal Horse Guards and 1st Dragoons).

== See also ==
- Horse Guards Regiment
- Blues and Royals
- Governor General's Horse Guards
- British cavalry during the First World War
- British Army

== Sources ==
=== Bibliography ===
==== Books ====
- Arthur, Sir George (1909). The Story of the Household Cavalry, vols 1 and 2 (1660–1902). Constable and Co.
- Arthur, Sir George (1926). The Story Household Cavalry (1914–1918). Vol. 3. William Heineman.
- Atkinson, C T (1921). Marlborough and the Rise of the British Army. New York.
- Cooper, Leo (1973). British Regular Cavalry 1644–1914. Northampton: Mercury Press.
- De Chair, Somerset (1944). The Golden Carpet. Faber & Faber.
- Fortescue, John William (1910). A History of the British Army. Vol. 20 vols. London.
- Gresswell, Albert (2009). Diseases & disorders of the horse: a treatise on equine medicine and surgery, being a contribution to the science of comparative pathology. Cornell University Press. ISBN 978-1429771214.
- Harwood, Brian. Chivalry and Command: 500 Years of Horse Guards. General Military Books.
- Hills, Richard J T (1970). A Short History of The Royal Horse Guards. Leo Cooper.
- Hills, Reginald John Taylor (1970). Royal Horse Guards (The Blues). Barnsley: Leo Cooper. ISBN 0850520274.
- Houlding, J A (1981). Fit for Service: The Training of the British Army 1713–1795. Oxford.
- Kochanski, Halik (1999). Sir Garnet Wolseley: A Victorian Hero. Hambledon Continuum. ISBN 1852851880.
- Lloyd, Nick (2013). Hundred Days. London: Macmillan.
- Lyman, Robert (2006). Iraq 1941: The Battles for Basra, Habbaniya, Fallujah and Baghdad. Campaign. Oxford, New York: Osprey Publishing. p. 96. ISBN 1-84176-991-6.
- McElwee, W.L. (1974). The art of war : Waterloo to Mons. London : Weidenfeld and Nicolson. ISBN 0-297-76865-4.
- Mead, Richard (2012). Cavalry General: The Life of General Sir Richard McCreery. Pen & Sword. ISBN 9781848844650.
- Orde, Roden (1953). The Household Cavalry at War: Second Household Cavalry Regiment. Aldershot: Gale and Polden.
- Orr, Michael (1972). On Dettingen 1743. London.
- Packe, Edmund (1847). A Historical Record of the Royal Regiment of Horse Guards or Oxford Blues.
- Reid, Walter (2011). Douglas Haig: Architect of Victory 1918. London.
- Sheffield, Dr Gary; Bourne, John (2008). Diaries and Letters of General Douglas Haig. London: Macmillan.
- Skrine, Francis (1906). Fontenoy and Great Britain's share in the War of the Austrian Succession 1741 –1748. Edinburgh: William Blackwood.
- Summers, Captain J.D. Nine Weeks in the Desert.
- Warner, J N P (1993). The Story of the Blues and Royals. Barnsley: Leo Cooper Pen and Sword Books.
- White-Spunner, Barney (2006). Horse Guards. London: Macmillan. ISBN 978-1405055741.

==== Articles ====
- Childs, John (1681). "The Army and the Oxford Parliament". English Historical Review. 94 (372).
- Fitzmaurice Stacke, Henry (October 1934). "Cavalry in Marlborough's Day". Cavalry Journal.
- Charles Jackson, ed. (1870). "Diary of Abraham de la Pryme". Surtees Society.
- "A Trumpeter of the 1st Horse Guards". Journal of the Society of Historical Research. LIX.

==== Manuscripts ====
- The Makins-Heyworth Correspondence, HCM, Box 7 AB2380
- PRO WO 5/1, f.53 (Blues)
- PRO WO 5/2
- Dr Buchanan's Diary, HCM
- Edmund Cox's Journal, NAM 8208/95-1
- Granby Papers, Rutland MSS, Misc., Boxes 69 and 163, and BM Collections.
- Northumberland correspondence with Hill, NAM ff.6309-138
- Journal of Capt Hon Arthur Meade, HCM.
