= De Capell Brooke baronets =

Extinct baronetcy in the Baronetage of the United Kingdom

Escutcheon of the de Capell-Brooke baronets of Oakley

The de Capell-Brooke Baronetcy, of Oakley in the County of Northampton, was a title in the Baronetage of the United Kingdom. It was created on 20 June 1803 for Richard de Capell-Brooke, a bencher of the Inner Temple and for 30 years Colonel of the Northamptonshire Militia. Born Richard Supple, he was the son of Richard Supple, of Ahadoe, who in the 1750s married Mary, daughter of Arthur Brooke, of Great Oakley, Northamptonshire. In 1797 he inherited the Great Oakley estate from his great-uncle, Wheeler Brooke, and assumed at that time by sign manual and in obedience to the testamentary injunction of his great-uncle the surname Brooke as well as the original surname of his family, de Capell. He was succeeded by his eldest son, the second Baronet, who was a noted travel writer and Fellow of the Royal Society. The fifth Baronet was High Sheriff of Rutland in 1899, a deputy lieutenant of Northamptonshire and a justice of the peace and also unsuccessfully stood three times for the parliamentary seat of East Northamptonshire. On 4 July 1939 he was elevated to the Peerage of the United Kingdom as Baron Brooke of Oakley, of Oakley in the County of Northampton. The barony became extinct on his death in 1944 while he was succeeded in the baronetcy by Sir Edward de Capell-Brooke, the fifth Baronet. The baronetcy became extinct on the latter's death in 1968.

== de Capell-Brooke baronets, of Oakley (1803) ==
- Sir Richard Brooke de Capell Brooke, 1st Baronet (1758–1829)
- Sir Arthur de Capell Brooke, 2nd Baronet (1791–1858)
- Sir William de Capell Brooke, 3rd Baronet (1801–1886)
- Sir Richard Lewis de Capell Brooke, 4th Baronet (1831–1892)
- Sir Arthur Richard de Capell Brooke, 5th Baronet (1869–1944) (created Baron Brooke of Oakley in 1939)

== Barons Brooke of Oakley (1939) ==
- Arthur Richard de Capell Brooke, 1st Baron Brooke of Oakley (1869–1944)

== de Capell-Brooke baronets, of Oakley (1803; reverted) ==
- Sir Edward Geoffrey de Capell Brooke, 6th Baronet (1880–1968)

== See also ==
- Brooke baronets
- Brookes baronets
- Brooks baronets

Baronetage of the United Kingdom
| Preceded by Peacocke baronets | de Capell-Brooke baronets of Oakley; 20 June 1803 | Succeeded by Stewart baronets |
