= Cosmo Gordon Logie =

Military surgeon and medical author

Deputy Surgeon-General Cosmo Gordon Logie FRSE
- Born: 25 August 1820; Bengal, India
- Died: 6 April 1886 (aged 65); Paddington, London
- Education: University of Edinburgh
- Known for: Medical author
- Medical career
- Profession: Military surgeon

Deputy Surgeon-General Cosmo Gordon Logie FRSE (1820–1886) was a military surgeon and medical author of Scots descent in the 19th century.

== Life ==
He was born in Bengal in India on 25 August 1820, the son of Elizabeth Sophia (née Arnold), daughter of Sir John Arnold, and Lt Col William Logie of Speymouth.

He was sent home to Scotland to study and trained in medicine at the University of Edinburgh graduating MD in 1840. He followed in his father's footsteps and joined the British Army as an Assistant Surgeon to the Rifle Brigade in 1841. In 1862 he became Surgeon Major to the Royal Horse Guards.

In 1871 he was elected a Fellow of the Royal Society of Edinburgh, his proposer was Alexander Hamilton LLB.

He retired in 1875 at the rank of Deputy Surgeon General and died at Paddington in London on 6 April 1886.

== Publications ==
- On the Cattle Disease (1866)
- The Causes of the Premature Decline of the Cavalry Soldier (1869)
