= Palestine Association =

UK association

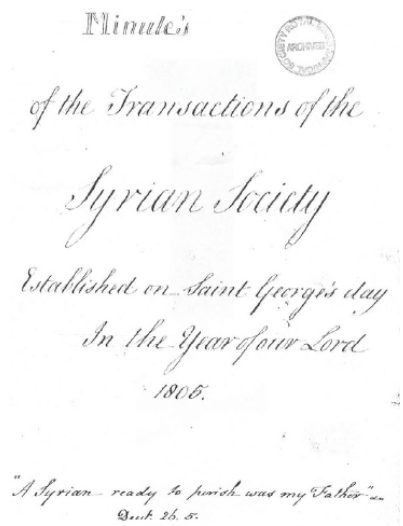
First minutes of the Palestine Association or Syrian Society (1805), referencing Deuteronomy 26:5

The Palestine Association, formerly the Syrian Society, was formed in 1805 by William Richard Hamilton to promote the study of the geography, natural history, antiquities and anthropology of Palestine and the surrounding areas, "with a view to the illustration of the Holy Writings".

The society appears to have been active for only the first five years of its existence. Scholars have suggested that the founding was ahead of its time, given that the country was at the early stages of opening to world influence, and that the timing was inopportune in the midst of the ongoing Napoleonic Wars. Scholarly work in the region began in earnest around the time of the Oriental Crisis of 1840, with the travels of Edward Robinson, the appointment of the first British consul to Jerusalem and the establishment of the Anglican-German Bishopric in Jerusalem. In 1834, the Palestine Association was formally disbanded and incorporated into the Royal Geographical Society.

The Palestine Association was the forerunner of the Palestine Exploration Fund, established 60 years later, in 1865.

== Formation ==
The society was founded on 31 March 1805, with its first meeting of 13 members taking place on 24 April 1805, at which it was decided with no further explanation that the Syrian Society "shall henceforth be denominated The Palestine Association"

The society was formed on the basis of the 1788 African Association, and the inquiries of the Society were directed to ascertaining:

- the natural and political boundaries of the several districts within these limits;
- the topographical and characteristic situations of Towns and Villages;
- the courses of the Streams and Rivers;
- the ranges of Mountains
- the natural productions of the Holy Land and its confines;
- each peculiarity of its soil, climate & minerals;
- elucidation of Jewish and Syrian antiquities.

British interest in Palestine had been stoked by the 1798-1801 French campaign in Egypt and Syria. Scholars have debated whether the founding of the society was driven primarily by religious and spiritual motives, or rather "reconstituted, redeployed, redistributed" in a secular orientalist framework.

== Publication ==
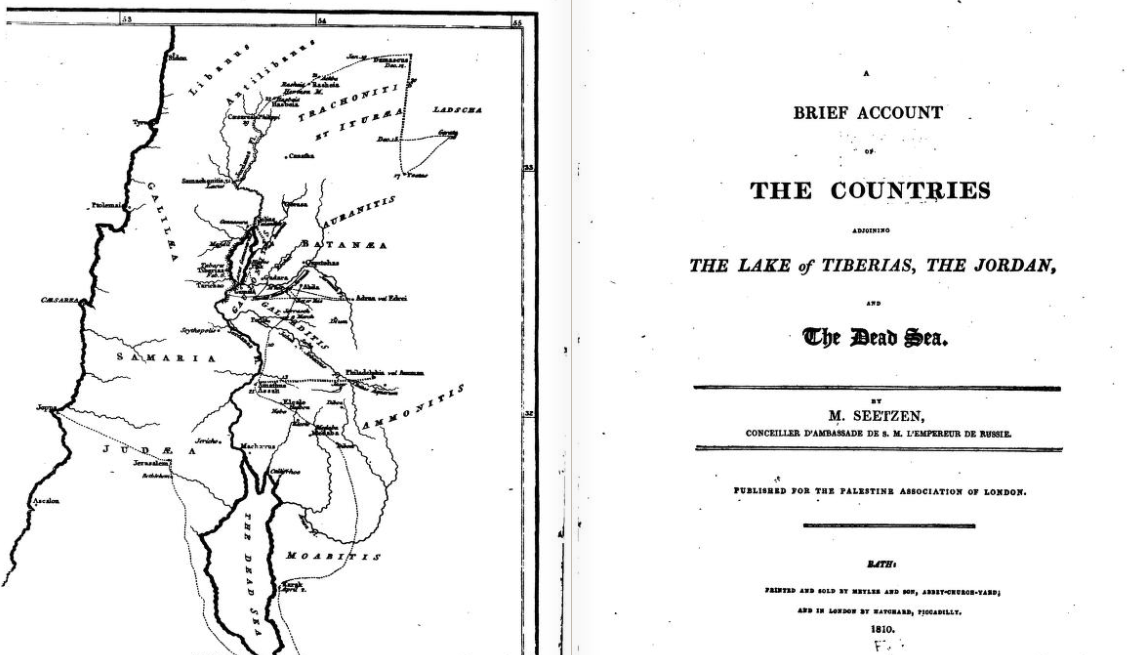
Front cover and map of the society's 1810 publication

In 1810, the association published the account of the travels of Ulrich Jasper Seetzen, entitled "A Brief Account of the Countries Adjoining the Lake of Tiberias, the Jordan, and the Dead Sea" In the preface to the publication, the editors noted that "We use the word Palestine not in its confined sense of a province or part of Judea, but in its most extended sense as comprehending all the countries on either side of the river Jordan, inhabited by the Tribes of Israel".

== Notable members ==
=== Founding members ===
- William Richard Hamilton
- Anthony Hamilton, Archdeacon of Colchester, William Richard Hamilton's father and first President of the society
- George Hamilton-Gordon, first treasurer of the society, later President, and later Prime Minister of the United Kingdom
- Thomas William Wrighte, late fellow of Queen’s College and first secretary of the society
- Henry Ryder
- John Hawkins
- William Cockburn
- John Brand
- Alexander Dalrymple
- William George Browne
- William Drummond, previously ambassador to the Ottoman Empire
- John Spencer Smith

=== Other notable members ===
- James Rennell
- Dudley Ryder, 1st Earl of Harrowby
- Richard Ryder
- Bartholomew Frere
- William Frere
- Joseph Banks
- Admiral Sidney Smith
- George Annesley, 2nd Earl of Mountnorris
- Thomas Bruce, 7th Earl of Elgin (of Elgin Marbles fame)
- Three members of the Goldsmid family
