= Raleigh Club =

Dining club

The Raleigh Club was a dining club founded in 1826. It met at the 'Thatched House', a tavern in the St James area of London as an alternative to the Travellers Club.

It was founded by Sir Arthur de Capell Brooke as a place where real exploring travellers could meet, exchange tales, and try the cuisine of far-off lands.

It served as an early developing forum for the Royal Geographical Society and became subsumed by that body later in the century (when it was still known as the Geographical Club).

Prominent early members included Sir John Barrow and Alexander Burnes.

In 1854, the Raleigh Club was dissolved as its members had become part of the Royal Geographical Society.
