= Lowther Lodge =

Historic house in London, and headquarters of Royal Geographical Society

Coordinates: 51.5013°N 0.1754°W

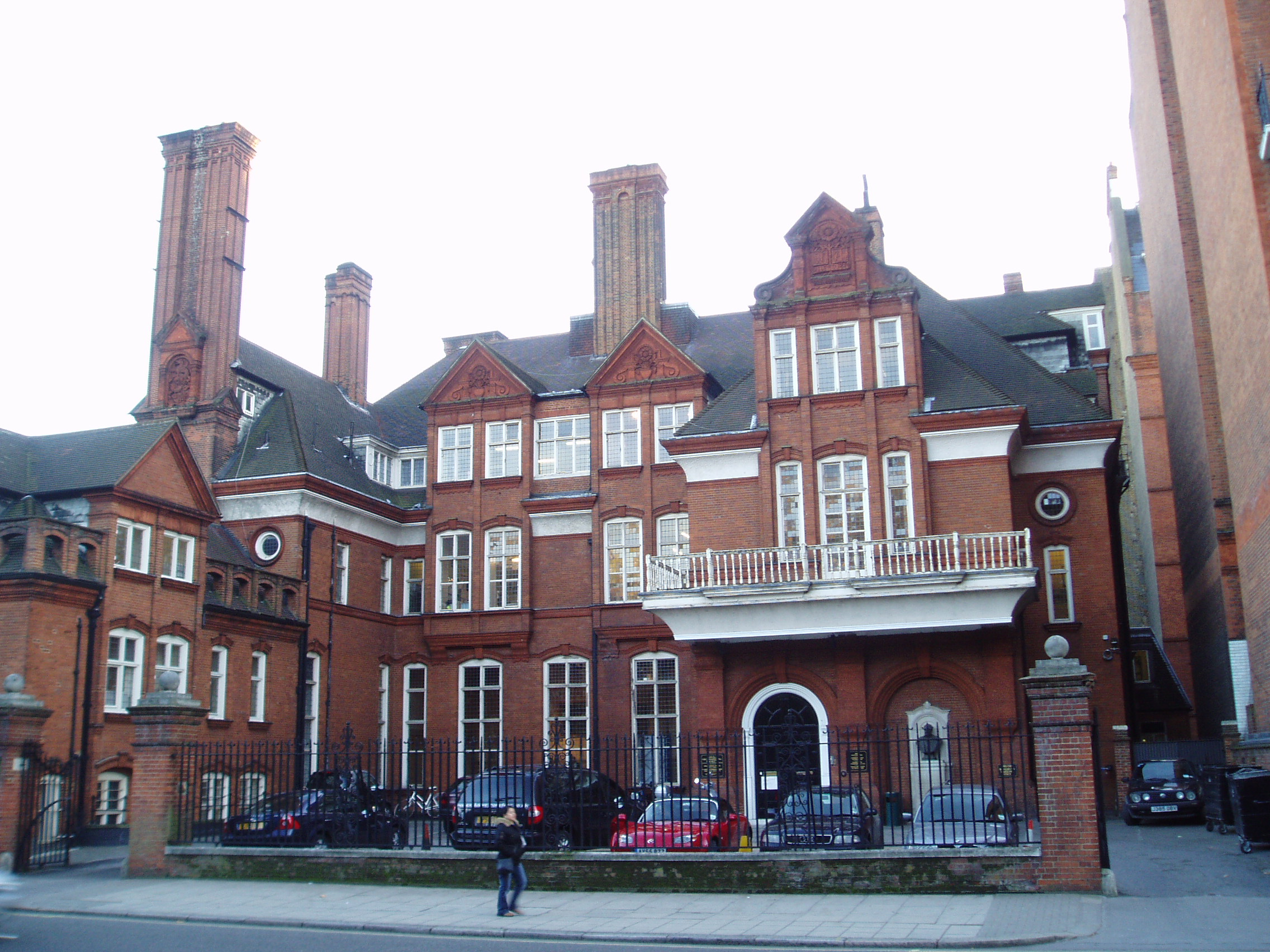
Lowther Lodge was designed by Richard Norman Shaw.

Lowther Lodge is a house in South Kensington, London, England, immediately south of Hyde Park, which has housed the Royal Geographical Society since 1912.

== History ==
Lowther Lodge was designed by Richard Norman Shaw and built between approximately 1872 and 1875. The client was William Lowther, an MP who was a nephew of the Earl of Lonsdale, the head of the Lowther landowning family of Westmorland and Cumberland.

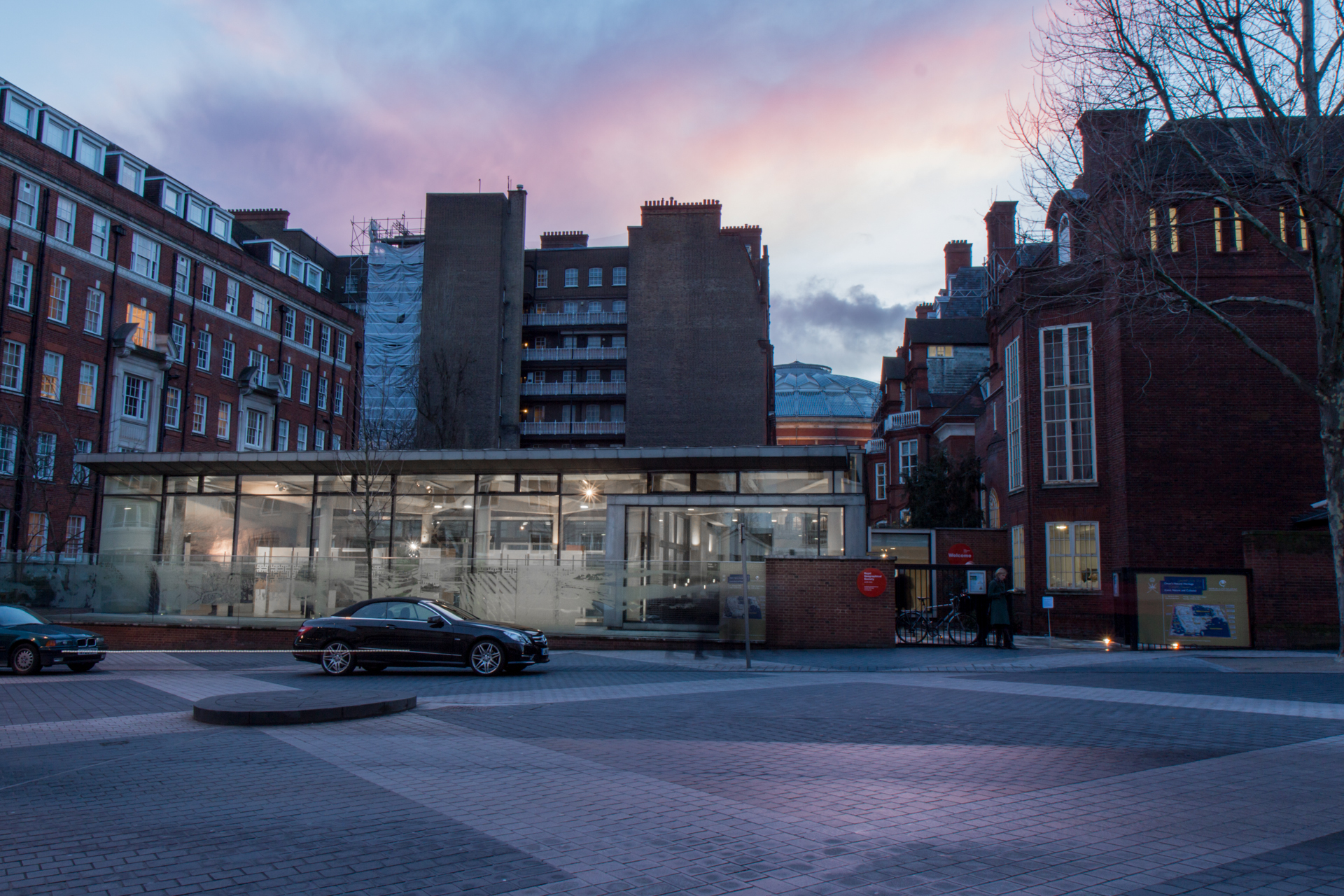
The extension and exhibition space, seen from Exhibition Road

After Lowther died in 1912, his son sold the house to the Royal Geographical Society. The Society converted the building into its headquarters and commissioned extensions, including the Society's lecture theatre, from G. L. Kennedy and F. B. Nightingale in 1928 to 1930. A further extension, including a new exhibition space, reading room and storage area for the Society's collections, was completed in 2004.

== Architecture ==
The building is an important example of Victorian Queen Anne architecture, with gothic influences. The building is also notable for having one of the first passenger lifts in a private house. It is a Grade II* listed building.

== See also ==
- Richard Norman Shaw
- William Lowther
- Royal Geographical Society
