= Bartholomew Frere =

English diplomat (1776–1851)

Bartholomew Frere (30 November 1776 – 29 May 1851) was a British diplomat.

== Life ==
Frere was born in 1776, the fifth son of John Frere, F.R.S., M.P. for Norwich, and a younger brother of John Hookham Frere and William Frere.

He was educated at Harrow School and then proceeded B.A. at Trinity College, Cambridge, in 1799, and M.A. in 1806.

=== Government service ===
In 1801 he was appointed secretary of legation at Lisbon, whence he was transferred in the same capacity to Madrid in 1802 and Berlin 1805, and in 1807 became secretary of embassy at Constantinople, and witnessed the discomfiture of Charles Arbuthnot and Admiral Duckworth.

In 1808 he returned to Spain as secretary of embassy. He acted as minister plenipotentiary ad interim at Seville from November 1808 to January 1809, and then at Cádiz from 29 Jan. to 2 March 1808.

Gazetted secretary of embassy at Constantinople in March 1811, he and his chief, Robert Liston, did not proceed to their post till the following year, when in June they relieved Stratford Canning from his responsibility as minister plenipotentiary.

From 1815 to 1817, and again from 1820 to 1821, Frere took charge of the embassy at the Porte as minister plenipotentiary ad interim.

=== Later life ===
In August 1821 he finally retired on a pension, which he enjoyed for thirty years, till his death.

Frere was described as a well read geographer and scholar. He was one of the seven founders of the Royal Geographical Society which formed on 16 July 1830.

Frere was known a collector of fine art. Among his collections were two notable works by Diego Velázquez (The Immaculate Conception and Saint John on Patmos) that are now in the National Gallery.

He died in Old Burlington Street, London, 29 May 1851, aged 74.

His DNB biographer, Stanley Lane-Poole, summed him up as "a useful public servant of ordinary abilities."
