= Arthur de Capell Brooke =

British baronet and travel writer

Sir Arthur de Capell Brooke, 2nd Baronet (22 June 1791 in Northamptonshire – 6 December 1858) was a British baronet and travel writer, Fellow of the Royal Society (1823) and co-establisher of the Raleigh Club (1827).

== Remarks on Norway ==
He travelled in Northern Norway in 1820 and remarked the following regarding sea monsters:

- «Off Otersoen.... It was of considerable length, and longer than it appeared, as it lay in large coils above the water to the height of many feet. Its head was shaped like that of a serpent; but he could not tell whether it had teeth or not. He said it emitted a very strong odour and that the boatmen were afraid to approach near it.»
- «At Alstahoeg I found the Bishop of the Nordlands (another clergyman!) who was an eye-witness to the appearance of two in the Bay of Sorsund, on the Drontheim Fjord.... They were swimming in large folds, part of which were seen above the water, and the length of the largest he judged to be about one hundred feet. They were of a darkish grey colour, the heads hardly discernible, from their being almost under water.»

His informants were the county administrator of Finnmark, the clergymen Marcus Fredrik Steen of Karlsøy and Peter Vogelius Deinboll of Vadsø (1816–1824); as well as the bishop of Nordland Mathias Bonsak Krogh. Later, in 1823 he was a traveler between the villages of Alta and Torneå, describing how the locals had discovered coffee.

== Books ==
He wrote and sketched in several publications from his expeditions:

- Travels through Sweden, Norway, and Finmark to the North Cape, in the Summer of 1820, London (1823)
- Winter Sketches in Lapland (1826) -- «Illustrations of a Journey from Alten on the Shores of the Polar Sea in 60° 55" North Lat. through Norwegian, Russian, and Swedish Lapland to Torneå at the Extremity of the Gulf of Bothnia. Intended to Exhibit a Complete View of the Mode of Travelling with Rein-Deer, the most Striking Incidents that Occurred during the Journey, and the General Character of the Winter Scenery of Lapland.»
- A Winter in the North Cape, John Murray (publisher), London (1827) -- «with various Observations relating to Finmark and its Inhabitants; made during a Residence at Hammerfest, near the North Cape»
- Sketches in Spain and Morocco, London (1831)

== See also ==
- De Capell Brooke baronets

Baronetage of the United Kingdom
Preceded by Richard de Capell Brooke	Baronet (of Oakley); 1829–1858	Succeeded by William de Capell Brooke
