= Phil Rees =

Phil Rees may refer to:

- Phil Rees (academic) (born 1944), British population geographer and demographer
- Phil Rees (greyhound trainer) (1914–1986), three times British champion trainer

== See also ==
- Philip Rees (born 1941), British writer and librarian
