= Anne-Katrin Kunde =

German historian (born 1968)

Anne-Katrin Kunde (née Richter; born 15 August 1968, in Leipzig) is a German historian, best known for her publications on the late Middle Ages, auxiliary sciences of history, and the history of women's education. She has worked as a researcher with the University of Leipzig, the University of Luxembourg, the University of Düsseldorf , the Free University of Berlin, and the Ruhr University Bochum.

She is involved in the continuation of the Livonian, Estonian, and Courlandian document collection (1472–1494).

Her research focuses on late medieval history, historical auxiliary sciences, women's monasteries and the history of religious orders, as well as the history of girls' and women's education.
