= David Linton (geographer) =

English geographer

David Leslie Linton
- Born: 12 July 1906; New Cross, London, England
- Died: 11 April 1971 (aged 64); Edgbaston, Birmingham, England
- Occupation: Geographer

David Leslie Linton (12 July 1906 – 11 April 1971) was a British geographer and geomorphologist, was professor of geography at Sheffield and Birmingham, best remembered for his work on the landscape development of south-east England with S. W. Wooldridge, and on the development of tors.

== Early life and education ==
David Linton was born in 1906 in New Cross, London, the second of three children of parents from Northern Ireland. He was educated at the nearby Haberdashers' Aske's Hatcham School and King's College London. He received a first class general honours degree in chemistry, physics, and geology in 1926 and a first class special honours degree in geography in 1927.

== Academic career ==
On graduation Linton initially worked at King's as demonstrator in geology, taking over from S.W.Wooldridge (later the first professor of geography at King's), who had recently completed his doctorate. In 1929 Linton moved to Edinburgh University. He nevertheless continued to collaborate with Wooldridge on a number of publications on the geology and geomorphology of south-east England during the 1930s, culminating in Structure, Surface and Drainage in South-east England (1939, republished 1955).

During World War II Linton carried out photo reconnaissance with the Royal Air Force Volunteer Reserve, later publishing The Interpretation of Air Photographs (1947). Following the war he was appointed professor of geography at Sheffield University in 1945. In 1958 he became professor at Birmingham University, where he remained until his death in 1971.

Much of his published post-war work was on the geomorphology of Scotland, including a series of papers on river capture. He identified the importance of glacial breaching of main watersheds (divides), and recognised that this process had been more intense in the west, with glacial dissection of the mountains declining eastwards (although his synthesis of this was published posthumously by Keith Clayton, see Publications). Concerned with denudation chronology (the reconstruction of long-term landform history), he became involved with study of the origin of tors in Scotland, on Dartmoor, the Pennines and South Africa. His view was that the British tors were a product of deep chemical weathering under a tropical climate in the Tertiary, exposed by erosion in the Pleistocene. This contrasted sharply with the views of others that tors are essentially arctic features produced by periglacial processes. This was part of his wider view of the importance of pre-glacial events and forms. However his attribution of the prevailing eastward flow of the major rivers of Scotland to emergence and tilted uplift of a fresh chalk seabed in the early Tertiary was dismissed in the PhD studies of French geomorphologist Alain Godard (later Professor at Paris).

At a meeting in Sheffield (with Wooldridge and others) in 1958, he was a founder member of what became the British Geomorphological Research Group, which he chaired in 1961.

Linton was honorary editor of Geography (1947–1965) and president of section E of the British Association for the Advancement of Science (1957), the Institute of British Geographers (1962) and the Geographical Association (1964).

== Personal life ==
Linton married Vera Tebbs in 1929. They had three sons and a daughter. He was a devoted family man, an able artist and musician. Though shy he was highly regarded as a lecturer and writer. He could be arrogant and disinclined to accept opposition, but was also capable of kindness. He died of cancer at the Queen Elizabeth Hospital, Edgbaston, Birmingham in 1971.

== Legacy ==
Like Wooldridge, Linton was a fieldworker whose approach has been superseded by the study of processes and quantitative analysis. Their major work on the development of south-east England has been shown to be based on too simplistic a view of tectonic history. It nonetheless remains as an enduring monument to one of the most distinctive phases of British geomorphology.

The David Linton Award of the British Society for Geomorphology (which incorporates the British Geomorphological Research Group) is given to a geomorphologist who has made a leading contribution to the discipline over a sustained period. Among many notable recipients have been Ralph A. Bagnold, Stanley A. Schumm, Richard Chorley, Luna Leopold, Eric H. Brown, Michael J. Kirkby, G.H. Dury, Cuchlaine A.M. King, Denys Brunsden, M. Gordon Wolman, J.B. Thornes, Ken Gregory, David Sugden and Desmond Walling.

Linton's notebooks are held by King's College archives.

== Selected publications ==
- Wooldridge, S.W. & Linton, D.L. (1933), The Loam-Terrains of Southeast England and their relation to its Early History. Antiquity Vol. 7 No. 27, 297–310.
- Wooldridge, S.W. & Linton, D.L. (1935), Some aspects of the Saxon settlement in southeast England considered in relation to the geographical background, Geography 20, 161–175.
- Wooldridge, S.W. & Linton, D.L. (1938a), Influence of the Pliocene transgression on the geomorphology of south-east England. Journal of Geomorphology 1, 40–54.
- Wooldridge, S.W. & Linton, D.L. (1938b), Some episodes in the structural evolution of south-east England. Proceedings of the Geologists' Association 49, 264–291.
- Wooldridge, S.W. & Linton, D.L. (1939), Structure, Surface and Drainage in South-east England. Institute of British Geographers, Publication, 10. (Reissued 1955 London: George Philip.)
- Linton, D.L. & Snodgrass C.P. (1946), Peeblesshire and Selkirkshire
- Linton, D.L. (1947), The Interpretation of Air Photographs, London.
- Linton, D.L. (1948), The ideal geological map. Advancement of science 5:141–148.
- Linton, D.L. (1948), Discovery, Education and Research
- Linton, D.L. (1949a), Unglaciated areas in Scandinavia and Great Britain. Irish Geography 2: 25–33.
- Linton, D.L. (1949b), Some Scottish river captives re-examined: I The diversion of the Feshie. Scottish Geographical Magazine 65, 123–132.
- Linton, D.L. (1950a), The scenery of the Cairngorm Mountains. Journal of the Manchester Geographical Society 55: 1–14.
- Linton, D.L. (1950b), Some Scottish River captures re-examined: II The diversion of the Tarf. Scottish Geographical Magazine 66.
- Linton, D.L. (1950c), Unglaciated enclaves in glaciated regions. Journal of Glaciology 1, 451–453.
- Linton, D.L. [1949](1951a), Watershed breaching by ice in Scotland. Transactions of the Institute of British Geographers 15, 1–15. [although cited by leading works as 1951, GoogleScholar and JStor confirm 1949]
- Linton, D.L. (1951b), Problems of Scottish scenery. Geography 41, 233–247.
- Linton, D.L. (1951c), Midland Drainage, Adv. sci. 7, 449.
- Linton, D.L. (1952), The significance of tors in glaciated lands, 17th International Congress. International Geographical Union, Washington, pp. 354–357.
- Linton, D. L. (1954), Some Scottish river captures re-examined: III. The beheading of the Don. Scottish Geographical Magazine 70: 64–78.
- Linton, D.L. (1955), The problem of tors, Geographical Journal 121(4), 470–487
- Linton, D.L. (ed.) (1956), Sheffield and its Region: a Scientific and Historical Survey, British Association for the Advancement of Science, London.
- Linton, D.L. Geomorphology. In: Linton, D.L, (ed.) ibid, 24–43.
- Linton, D.L. (1959a), River Flow in Great Britain, 1955–56, Nature 183, 714.
- Linton, D.L. (1959b), Morphological contrasts between eastern and western Scotland. In: R. Miller and J.W. Watson (Editors), Geographical essays in memory of Alan G. Ogilvie. Nelson, Edinburgh, pp. 16–45.
- Linton, D.L. & Moisley, H.A. (1960) The origin of Loch Lomond. Scottish Geographical Magazine 76, 26–37.
- Linton, D.L. (1962). Glacial erosion on soft-rock outcrops in central Scotland. Builetyn Peryglacjalny 11, 247–257.
- Linton, D.L. (1963), The forms of glacial erosion. Trans. IBG 33, 1–28.
- Linton, D.L. (1964), The origin of the Pennine tors – an essay in analysis. Zeitschrift für Geomorphologie 8: 5–24.
- Linton, D.L. (1967), Divide elimination by glacial erosion. In: Arctic and Alpine environments (Wright and Osburn Eds), 241–248.
- Linton, D.L. & Moseley, F. (1968), The Geological Ages, Cambridge University Press
- Linton, D.L. (1968) The Assessment of Scenery As A Natural Resource. Scottish Geographical Magazine 84.
- Linton, D.L. (1969). Evidences of Pleistocene cryonival phenomena in South Africa. Palaeoecol. Afr. Surround. Isl. 5, 71–89.
- Clayton K.M. (1974). Zones of glacial erosion. Institute of British Geographers Special Publication, 7: 163–176 (includes unpublished material by D.L. Linton)

== Awards ==
In 1943, Linton received the Murchison Award from the Royal Geographical Society. He was elected as a member of the Leopoldina in 1961. In 1971 he was appointed an honorary fellow of King's College London.
