= David E. Sugden =

British glaciologist and geo-scientist

David Edward Sugden FRSE, FRSGS is an emeritus professor and senior research fellow at the University of Edinburgh. He is a glaciologist and glacial geomorphologist. His research focuses in particular on glacial and polar landforms, Antarctic ice sheet stability, and the dynamics of the Patagonian ice cap under a changing climate. He has served as President of the Geography Section of the British Association, Vice President of the Royal Geographical Society, President of the Institute of British Geographers, and Director of SAGES (Scottish Alliance for Geoscience, Environment, and Society). At the University of Edinburgh, Sugden has twice been Department Head of Geography and was also the inaugural Head of the School of Geosciences.

He is a winner of the International Glaciological Society's Seligman Crystal. This award is given to a researcher who has "made exceptional scientific contributions to glaciology, defined as any snow and/or ice studies, so that the subject is now significantly enriched". He has also won the Vega Medal for physical geography from the Swedish Society for Anthropology and Geography; the Polar Medal for outstanding contribution to polar science and exploration by a British citizen; the David Linton Award from the British Society for Geomorphology; the Royal Geographical Society’s Cuthbert Peek Award; and the Royal Scottish Geographical Society’s Mungo Park Medal.

Sugden is a Fellow of the Royal Society of Edinburgh. He has received honorary degrees from the Stockholm University and the University of Dundee.
