= Butlin =

Surname

Butlin is a surname that may refer to:

- Barry Butlin (born 1949), English footballer
- Sir Billy Butlin (1899–1980), British entrepreneur, founder of the Butlin's chain of holiday camps
- Sir Henry Butlin, 1st Baronet (1845–1912), British surgeon
- Martin Butlin (born 1929), British art historian
- Noel Butlin (1921–1991), Australian economic historian
- Paul Butlin (born 1976), English heavyweight boxer
- Robin Butlin (born 1938), British professor of geography
- Ron Butlin (born 1949), Scottish poet and novelist
- Ron Butlin (ice hockey) (1925–2014), Canadian ice hockey executive
