= Kevin Kiley =

Kevin Kiley may refer to:

- Kevin C. Kiley (born 1950), United States Army general
- Kevin F. Kiley, American military historian
- Kevin Kiley (sportscaster), American sportscaster and talk show host
- Kevin Kiley (wrestler) (Kevin Robert Kiley Jr., born 1981), American wrestler formerly known as Alex Riley
- Kevin Kiley (politician) (born 1985), U.S. representative for California's 3rd congressional district
