= Encyclopaedistics =

Academic scholarship of encyclopedias

Encyclopaedistics or encyclopaedics as a discipline, is the academic scholarship of encyclopedias as sources of encyclopedic knowledge and cultural objects as well; in this sense, this discipline is also known as "encyclopaedia studies" and can be termed as "theoretical encyclopaediography" by analogy with theoretical lexicography. Encyclopaedistics as a practical activity (profession or business) also called "encyclopaedic practice" or "encyclopedism" is the process of assembling encyclopaedias available to the public for sale or for free (encyclopaedia publishing or practical encyclopediography). In this sense, it is the art or craft of writing, compiling, and editing the paper or online encyclopedias. As a practical activity, encyclopaedistics originated in the Middle Ages in connection with the development of compendiums based on alphabetical structuring (e.g. first edition of Polyanthea by Dominicus Nanus Mirabellius). Encyclopaedistics is often defined as "the art and science of selecting and disseminating the information most significant to mankind".

== Field of study ==
Encyclopaedistics is a specialized aspect of information science and communication science. At the same time, encyclopaedistics is also considered as one of scholarly disciplines which are seen as auxiliary for historical research (auxiliary sciences of history) . Third, encyclopaedics is a domain of philosophy (Romanticism). This term associated with German philosophers of the 18th century, such as Novalis, Friedrich Schlegel, who sought to create a "Scientific Bible" - both real and ideal book as the quintessence of human education (enlightenment).

In any case, the most popular topics in encyclopaedia studies refferd the history of organization of encyclopaedic knowledge, encyclopaedic knowledge determination and selection, glossary composition, current state of development of encyclopaedic activity, features of making encyclopaedias and encyclopaedic articles, usage, role and significance of encyclopaedias, typology of encyclopaedic literature, encyclopaedists and encyclopaedic schools, opposition of classical encyclopaedias and Wikipedia as well as paper encyclopaedias and online encyclopaedias, case experience in building encyclopedias etc.

In general, scholarly studies contribute to appearance of successful well-crafted encyclopaedias with high-quality articles.

== Contemporary encyclopaedic practice ==
Today, academic institutions, universities, and publishing companies worldwide are engaged in encyclopaedic activity building national, multinational (universal), regional and subject-specific encyclopaedias, or doing studies related encyclopaedias. The development of national encyclopaedias is one of the prerogatives of the European Parliament in the policy of protection of accurate and verified information and in the fight against mis- and disinformation as well as in the policy of protecting, promoting and projecting Europe's values and interests in the world.
