= Viles =

Viles may refer to:

== People ==
- Heather Viles, English academic

== Places ==
- Viles Arboretum, United States
- Viles or Villesse, Italy
