= Historical science =

Historical science may refer to:

- History, the study of the past as it is described in written documents
- Auxiliary sciences of history
- Any science that draws its data from records of past events, as opposed to "experimental" or "operational" science
- Some philosophers of science create a distinction between experimental science and "historical science," using the term history to describe all of the past as "historical sciences". "Historical sciences" can include geology, paleontology, and certain aspects of astrophysics. It is important to understand that these philosophers do not cast doubt on scientific predictions related to the past but rather propose a semantic difference which has not been widely adapted by historians or any scientific discipline which studies the past.
- Various pseudo-scientists have used a hypothetical distinction between experimental science and "historical science" to claim that science can not make predictions about the past. This claim is demonstrably false.
- History of science
