= Joseph Holden =

Joseph Holden may refer to:

- Joe Holden (1913–1996), American baseball player, manager and scout
- Joseph W. Holden (1844–1875), North Carolina politician
- Joey Holden (born 1990), Irish hurler
- Joseph Holden, Veritas International University President
- Joseph Holden (born 1975), British geographer
