= Victoria Medal =

Victoria Medal may refer to:

- Victoria Medal (geography), by the Royal Geographical Society
- Victoria Medal of Honour, by the Royal Horticultural Society
- Victoria Cross, military medal of the British Commonwealth
