= Ren Mei'e =

- 任美鍔
- Born: 8 September 1913; Ningbo, Zhejiang, China
- Died: 4 November 2008 (aged 95)
- Citizenship: China
- Education: Nanjing University (B.S); University of Glasgow (PhD)
- Known for: geology geomorphology modern China's coastline & ports plan
- Awards: Victoria Medal (1986)
- Scientific career
- Fields: geology geomorphology coastal science marine science
- Workplaces: Zhejiang University; Fudan University; Nanjing University; NIGLAS

Ren Mei'e (Chinese: 任美鍔; Wade–Giles: Jen Mei-e; 1913–2008) was a Chinese geomorphologist, geologist, marine and coastal scientist, educator and professor, who was the main founder for the study of many related subjects in modern China.

== Biography ==
Ren was born in Zhenhai, Ningbo, Zhejiang, China on 8 September 1913. In 1934 Ren graduated from the Department of Geology of National Central University (now Nanjing University). In 1939 Ren received his doctorate from the University of Glasgow, Scotland.

Ren was a professor of Zhejiang University, Fudan University and later Nanjing University. He was the head of the Department of Geography (now School of Geographic and Oceanographic Sciences), Nanjing University.

Ren was selected to be an academician of the Chinese Academy of Sciences in 1980.

== Academic positions ==
- Academician, Chinese Academy of Sciences (1980 election)
- President, Nanjing Institute of Geography and Limnology, Chinese Academy of Sciences (NIGLAS, formally known as the Geographic Institute of China)
- Honorary President, Chinese Society for Oceanography
- President and later Honorary President, Chinese Geographical Society

== Honors and awards ==
Ren received the Victoria Medal from the Royal Geographical Society of London in 1986.
