= Heather Viles =

Professor of biogeomorphology and heritage conservation

- Citizenship: British
- Occupations: Professor of biogeomorphology and heritage conservation
- Awards: Founder's Medal (2020)

Academic background
- Education: University of Oxford University of Cambridge

Academic work
- Discipline: Geography
- Sub-discipline: Geomorphology
- Institutions: Oxford University

Heather Viles is a professor of biogeomorphology and heritage conservation in the school of geography and the environment at Oxford University, senior research fellow at Worcester College, and honorary professor at the Institute of Sustainable Heritage, University College London. She is a Fellow of the British Society for Geomorphology.

== Education ==
Viles obtained her MA in geography from the University of Cambridge, and a DPhil from the University of Oxford. Her DPhil research investigated the role of microorganisms in weathering limestone, based on fieldwork on Aldabra Atoll in the Seychelles.

== Career and research ==
Following her DPhil, she undertook post-doctoral research on the contribution of acid rain to the deterioration of English cathedrals. Her research has focused on geomorphology and heritage science. Her research is highly interdisciplinary and includes geomorphology with ecology, engineering geology, environmental chemistry, and materials conservation. Her research investigates biological contributions to geomorphology; processes of weathering, geomorphology and landscape evolution in extreme environments and processes of building stone decay and conservation.

She is currently the co-director of the Engineering and Physical Sciences Research Council Centre for Doctoral Training in Science and Engineering in Art, Heritage, and Archaeology. Since 2019 she has held the position of chair of the British Society for Geomorphology, having previously been chair from 2012 to 2014. Viles was director of Undergraduate Studies (2008–2011), director of research (2012–2015), and head of the School of Geography and the Environment (2015–2019) at Oxford University, and vice provost of Worcester College from 2012 to 2014. From 2008 to 2011, she was vice-president (Expeditions and Fieldwork) of the Royal Geographical Society with the Institute of British Geographers. From 2008 to 2012 she was a member of the advisory panel of the joint Arts and Humanities Research Council/Engineering and Physical Sciences Research Council Science and Heritage Programme, and member of the National Heritage Science Strategy steering group co-ordinated by English Heritage that developed a UK-wide Heritage Science Strategy to direct policy over the next 25 years.

She is a member of the editorial board of Transactions of the Institute of British Geographers. She was a Member of the International Association of Geomorphologists Executive Committee 2013–2017, and Associate Editor of the academic journal Earth Surface Processes and Landforms. Currently she currently a Senior Editor of Earth Surface Dynamics journal.

== Awards and honours ==
Viles was awarded the 2015 Ralph Alger Bagnold Medal from the European Geosciences Union for her role in establishing the field of biogeomorphology. In 2019 she was awarded the Melvin G. Marcus distinguished career award of the Geomorphology Specialty Group, American Association of Geographers. In 2020 she was recipient of the Founder's Medal of the Royal Geographical Society for her excellence in establishing the field of biogeomorphology.

== Selected publications ==
- Heather Viles and Andrew Goudie. The Earth Transformed. Blackwell
- Alisdair Rogers and Heather Viles.2007.Student's Companion to Geography (2nd edition) Blackwell.
- Andrew Goudie and Heather Viles. 2010. Landscapes and Geomorphology: a Very Short Introduction. Oxford University Press.
- Andrew Goudie and Heather Viles. 2015. Landscapes and landforms of Namibia (World Geomorphological Landscapes). Springer.

Heather Viles. 1988. Biogeomorphology.Wiley-Blackwell.
