= Tim Burt =

British geographer

- Born: Timothy Peter Burt; 23 December 1951 (age 74)
- Citizenship: British
- Education: St John's College, Cambridge (BA); Carleton University (MA); Bristol University (PhD)
- Spouse: Liz Burt
- Children: 2
- Awards: David Linton Award (2017)
- Scientific career
- Workplaces: Huddersfield Polytechnic; Oxford University; Durham University
- Thesis: Runoff processes in a small upland catchment with special reference to the role of hillslope hollows (1978)
- Notable students: Joseph Holden

Timothy Peter Burt (born 23 December 1951) is a British geographer, academic, and academic administrator. He was Master of Hatfield College, Durham and Professor of Geography at the University of Durham between 1996 and 2017. He had previously taught at Huddersfield Polytechnic, the University of Oxford, and Keble College, Oxford.

== Early life and education ==
Burt was born on 23 December 1951 in Mells, Somerset, England. He was educated at Sexey's School, then an all-boys state grammar school in Bruton, Somerset. He studied geography at St John's College, Cambridge, graduating with a first class Bachelor of Arts (BA) degree in 1973. He then studied at Carleton University, where he undertook research on frozen soils and graduated with a Master of Arts (MA) degree in 1974. He then moved to the University of Bristol where he undertook postgraduate research on hillslope hydrology, and he completed his Doctor of Philosophy (PhD) degree in 1978.

== Academic career ==
From 1977 to 1984, Burt was senior lecturer at Huddersfield Polytechnic. In 1984, he joined the University of Oxford where he had been appointed a lecturer in physical geography and elected a Fellow of Keble College, Oxford. At Keble, he also worked as dean and then as senior tutor.

In 1996, Burt moved to Durham University, where he became Master of Hatfield College, Durham and he was appointed Professor of Geography. From 2002 to 2007, he also served as Dean of Colleges. In 2010, he was a visiting professor at Oregon State University. From September 2016 to January 2017, he was Pro-Vice-Chancellor for Colleges and Student Experience.

Since 1982, Burt has been a trustee of the Field Studies Council. He served as chairman from 1996 to 2014, and has been its president since 2014.

== Personal life ==
In 1973, Burt married Elizabeth Anne Sapsford. Together they have two children: Emma and Tom.

== Honours ==
In December 2012, Burt was elected a Fellow of the American Geophysical Union. In September 2013, he was elected a Fellow of the British Society for Geomorphology. In April 2017, he was awarded the 2017 David Linton Award by the British Society for Geomorphology.

== Selected works ==
- Anderson, M. G.; Burt, T. P., eds. (1990). Process studies in hillslope hydrology. Chichester: Wiley. ISBN 978-0471927143.
- Kirkby, M. J.; Naden, P. S.; Burt, T. P.; Butcher, D. P. (1992). Computer Simulation in Physical Geography (2nd ed.). Chichester: Wiley. ISBN 978-0471935469.
- Burt, Tim; Allison, R. J., eds. (2007). Sediment cascades: an integrated approach. Weinheim: Wiley. ISBN 978-0470849620.
