= Sidney William Wooldridge =

Professor Sidney Wooldridge
- Born: Sidney William Wooldridge; 16 November 1900; Hornsey
- Died: 25 April 1963 (aged 62); London
- Occupation: Geographer
- Awards: Fellow of the Royal Society

Professor Sidney William Wooldridge CBE, FRS, FGS (16 November 1900 – 25 April 1963), geologist, geomorphologist and geographer, was a pioneer in the study of the geomorphology of south-east England and the first professor of geography at King's College London. He collaborated with Dudley Stamp and with David Linton.

== Early life and education ==
Sidney Wooldridge was born in Hornsey, North London in 1900, the younger son of a bank clerk. His early childhood was spent in Cheam, Surrey, and his later schooling in Wood Green, north London, where he also took evening classes in geology. He read geology at King's College London (1918–1921), graduating with a first-class degree. Research in petrology led to an MSc (1923) and DSc (1927). His study of the Tertiary and Pleistocene deposits of the North Downs and Chiltern Hills of southern England led to an interest in geomorphology.

== Academic career ==
In the 1920s and 30s Wooldridge lectured at King's on a combined geography and geology course with the London School of Economics (LSE). In the Joint School of Geography King's offered Geomorphology, Meteorology, Biogeography and the History of Geographical Discovery, while the LSE offered the Regional and Economic aspects, Historical Geography, and the Distribution of Man. During World War II this arrangement was disrupted by the evacuation of King's to Bristol, requiring Wooldridge to teach human geography. His conversion to geography complete, he became professor of geography at Birkbeck College, London in 1944, returning to King's in 1947 as its first professor of geography and remaining until his death in 1963.

Wooldridge was a founder-member of the Institute of British Geographers (1933) for academics dissatisfied with the Royal Geographical Society's focus on amateur research and exploration; he was later IBG president (1949–50). He did not break completely with the RGS, serving on its council (1947–51). Wooldridge also served as president of the geography section of the British Association (1950) and chaired the Field Studies Council in 1952.

== Research ==
Wooldridge's work concentrated mainly on the London Basin and the Weald, his first (1921) paper being on folding within the London Basin. Other publications looked at the Reading Beds, Eocene and Pliocene deposits and the structural and geomorphological evolution of the basin. Inspired by the theories of W.M.Davis on cycles of landscape evolution, Wooldridge employed detailed fieldwork to identify features such as river terraces and erosion surfaces, for example a presumed platform at 200 feet above modern sea level. In the later 1930s collaboration with colleague David Linton culminated in the 1939 classic Structure, Surface and Drainage of South-East England.

The 'Wooldridge and Linton Model' of landscape evolution was dependent on the identification of remnants of three widely developed erosion surfaces: a warped sub-Eocene surface; a high-level unwarped Neogene peneplain and an unwarped Plio-Pleistocene marine platform. It explained both the concordant drainage pattern of the central Weald (through long-term sub-aerial erosion), and the widespread discordant features (as being related to a high-level marine shelf).

Wooldridge also collaborated with fellow King's alumnus Dudley Stamp. Wooldridge had provided petrological input to a paper with Stamp on the Silurian of Wales as early as 1923 and, like Stamp, moved from geology towards human geography. Wooldridge's interest lay in relating early human settlement and land use to the physical landscape. In 1951 Stamp at LSE and Wooldridge at King's jointly edited London Essays in Geography.

== Personal life ==
Like Dudley Stamp, Wooldridge married a King's geography student, Edith Stephens. Wooldridge was a keen golfer and cricketer, a Congregationalist lay preacher (converting later to the Church of England) and an amateur operetta enthusiast. He continued to work after a stroke in 1954, dying in 1963.

== Legacy ==
In 1980 the Institute of British Geographers marked the fortieth anniversary of Structure, Surface and Drainage in South-East England by the publication of The Shaping of Southern England (, a collection of papers which both emphasised the importance of the work, and showed how dated it had become. Fundamentally, the 'Wooldridge and Linton Model' was based on the view that the south-east region had been tectonically stable except for two brief periods, in the Upper Cretaceous and the mid-Tertiary. Subsequent work has shown that this view is far too simplistic, throwing much of the interpretation of cycles of landscape evolution into doubt.

More serious are criticisms of Wooldridge's overemphasis on form over process. However, his role as a pioneer geomorphologist, and emphasis on historical perspective and regional focus remained important.

== Selected published works ==
- Wooldridge, S.W. (1921). "Evidence of folding in the Tertiary and Cretaceous rocks near South mimms and Ridge Hill". Proceedings of the Geologists' Association of London. 32 (4): 227–231. doi:10.1016/s0016-7878(21)80031-0.
- Wooldridge, S.W.; Berdinner, H.C. (1922). "Notes on the geology of the Langdon Hills, Essex". Proc. Geol. Assoc. 33 (4): 320–323. doi:10.1016/s0016-7878(22)80032-8.
- Wells, A.K.; Wooldridge, S.W. (1923a). "The mechanism of Sedimentation cycles". Geological Magazine. 60 (12): 545–60. Bibcode:1923GeoM...60..545W. doi:10.1017/s0016756800088828. S2CID 128819945.
- Wooldridge, S.W. (1923). "Minor structures of the London Basin". Proc. Geol. Assoc. 34 (3): 175–193. Bibcode:1923PrGA...34..175W. doi:10.1016/s0016-7878(23)80008-6.
- Wells, A.K.; Wooldridge, S.W. (1923b). "Notes on the geology of Epping Forest". Proc. Geol. Assoc. 34 (3): 244–252. Bibcode:1923PrGA...34..244W. doi:10.1016/s0016-7878(23)80014-1.
- Stamp, L.D. & Wooldridge, S.W. (1923), The Igneous and Associated Rocks of Llanwrtyd (Brecon), Quarterly Journal of the Geological Society 79 issue.1–4, p. 16–46
- Cornes, H.W.; Wooldridge, S.W. (1923). "A system of basic intrusions at the northern end of the island of Sark". Geol. Mag. 60 (11): 500–505. Bibcode:1923GeoM...60..500W. doi:10.1017/S0016756800088476. S2CID 129125646.
- Wooldridge, S.W. (1924). "The Bagshot Beds of Essex". Proc. Geol. Assoc. 35 (4): 359–383. Bibcode:1924PrGA...35..359W. doi:10.1016/s0016-7878(24)80014-7.
- Wooldridge, S.W.; Gill, D.M.C. (1925). "The Reading Beds of Lane End, Bucks, and their bearing on some unsolved problems of London geology". Proceedings of the Geologists' Association. 36: 146–173. doi:10.1016/s0016-7878(25)80003-8.
- Wooldridge, S.W.; Stockley, G.M. (1925). "The petrology of Sark". Geol. Mag. 62 (6): 241–252. Bibcode:1925GeoM...62..241W. doi:10.1017/s0016756800105473. S2CID 130542930.
- Wooldridge, S.W. (1925). "The tectonics of the southern Midlands". Geol. Mag. 62 (12): 559–60. Bibcode:1925GeoM...62..559W. doi:10.1017/s001675680010634x.
- Wooldridge, S.W. (1926). "The structural evolution of the London Basin". Proc. Geol. Assoc. 37 (2): 162–196. Bibcode:1926PrGA...37..162W. doi:10.1016/s0016-7878(26)80002-1.
- Wooldridge, S.W. (1927). "The Pliocene period in the London Basin". Proc. Geol. Assoc. 38: 49–132. doi:10.1016/s0016-7878(27)80024-6.
- Wooldridge, S.W. (1928). "The 200-foot platform in the London Basin". Proc. Geol. Assoc. 39 (1): 1–26. Bibcode:1928PrGA...39....1W. doi:10.1016/s0016-7878(28)80030-7.
- Wells, A.K.; Wooldridge, S.W. (1931). "The rock groups of Jersey, with special reference to intrusive phenomena at Ronez". Proc. Geol. Assoc. XIII (178): 215.
- Wooldridge, S.W. (1932). "The Physiographic Evolution of the London Basin". Geography. 17: 99–116.
- Wooldridge, S.W.; Linton, D.L. (1933). "The Loam-Terrains of Southeast England and their relation to its Early History". Antiquity. 7 (27): 297–310. doi:10.1017/S0003598X0000822X. S2CID 163643334.
- Wooldridge, S.W.; Ewing, C.J.C. (1935). "The Eocene and Pliocene deposits of Lane End, Buckinghamshire". Quarterly Journal of the Geological Society. 91 (1–4): 293–317. Bibcode:1935QJGS...91..293W. doi:10.1144/gsl.jgs.1935.091.01-04.11. S2CID 130796298.
- Wooldridge, S.W. & Morgan, R.S. (1937), The Physical Basis of Geography. An Outline of Geomorphology. London: Longmans, Green.
- Wooldridge, S.W.; Linton, D.L. (1938a). "Influence of the Pliocene transgression on the geomorphology of south-east England". Journal of Geomorphology. 1: 40–54.
- Wooldridge, S.W.; Linton, D.L. (1938b). "Some episodes in the structural evolution of south-east England". Proceedings of the Geologists' Association. 49: 264–291. doi:10.1016/s0016-7878(38)80025-0.
- Wooldridge, S.W. & Linton, D.L. (1939), Structure, Surface and Drainage in South-east England. Institute of British Geographers, Publication, 10. (Reissued 1955 London: George Philip.)
- Wooldridge, S.W. (1945), Yorkshire (North Riding) in The Land of Britain – The Report of The Land Utilisation Survey of Britain (Ed. Stamp, L.D.)
- Wooldridge, S.W. (1949). "Geomorphology and soil science". Journal of Soil Science. 1: 31–34. doi:10.1111/j.1365-2389.1950.tb00716.x.
- Wooldridge, S.W. & Beaver, S.H. (1950) 'The working of sand and gravel in Britain: a problem in land use', Geographical . 115: 42–57
- Stamp, L.D. & Wooldridge S.W., eds (1951) London Essays in Geography. London: Longmans, Green & Co., for London School of Economics.
- Wooldridge, S.W. (1951), 'The progress of geomorphology', in G. Taylor (ed.) Geography in the Twentieth Century, London, ch. 7.
- Wooldridge, S.W. & East, W.G. (1951), The Spirit & Purpose of Geography. London: Hutchinson.
- Wooldridge, S.W. & Goldring, F. (1953), The Weald. New Naturalist series No. 26, London: Collins.
- Wooldridge, S.W. (1955). "The status of geography and the role of fieldwork". Geography. 40: 73–83.
- O'Dell A.C., East, W.G. & Wooldridge S.W. (1956), Railways and Geography. London: Hutchinson's University Library
- Wooldridge, S.W. (1956). The Geographer as Scientist: Essays on the Scope and Nature of Geography. London: Nelson. Contains Wooldridge's 1946 Birkbeck College inaugural lecture, The geographer as scientist.
- Wooldridge, S.W. (1957), Some Aspects of the Physiography of the Thames Valley in Relation to the Ice Age and Early Man. Proceedings of the Prehistoric Society, Vol. 23 pp1–19.
- Wooldridge, S.W. (1958). "The trend of geomorphology". Transactions of the Institute of British Geographers. 25 (25): 29–35. doi:10.2307/621176. JSTOR 621176.
- Wooldridge, S.W. (1960). "The Pleistocene succession in the London Basin". Proc. Geol. Assoc. 71 (2): 113–129. Bibcode:1960PrGA...71..113W. doi:10.1016/s0016-7878(60)80001-6.

== Awards ==
Wooldridge received a number of awards to fund fieldwork, including the Royal Geographical Society's Murchison Award with David Linton in 1942. He was made CBE in 1954 in recognition of his work on the Sand and Gravel Council. In 1957 he received the Royal Geographical Society's Victoria Medal and in 1959 was elected a Fellow of the Royal Society, a rare honour among geographers.
