= Paul Shaw =

Paul Shaw may refer to:

- Paul Shaw (footballer) (born 1973), English football player and coach
- Paul Shaw (cricketer) (born 1967), English cricketer
- Paul Shaw (sport shooter) (1949–2026), represented Canada at the 2010 Commonwealth Games
- Paul Shaw (rugby league) (born 1965), Australian rugby league player
- Paul A. Shaw (born 1947), British geographer
- Paul Shaw (design historian) (born 1954), American designer, calligrapher and historian of design

== See also ==
- Pauly Shore (born 1968), American comedian and actor
