= Victoria Medal (geography) =

British geography award

- Awarded for: geography
- Sponsored by: Royal Geographical Society
- Country: United Kingdom
- Website: https://www.rgs.org/search?searchTerm=Victoria%20Medal

The Victoria Medal is an award presented by the Royal Geographical Society. It is awarded "for conspicuous merit in research in geography" and has been given since 1902, in honour of the late Queen Victoria. Up until then, the society's Patron's Medal had alternatively been known as the "Victoria Medal", and the new medal resembled its original design.

== Past recipients ==
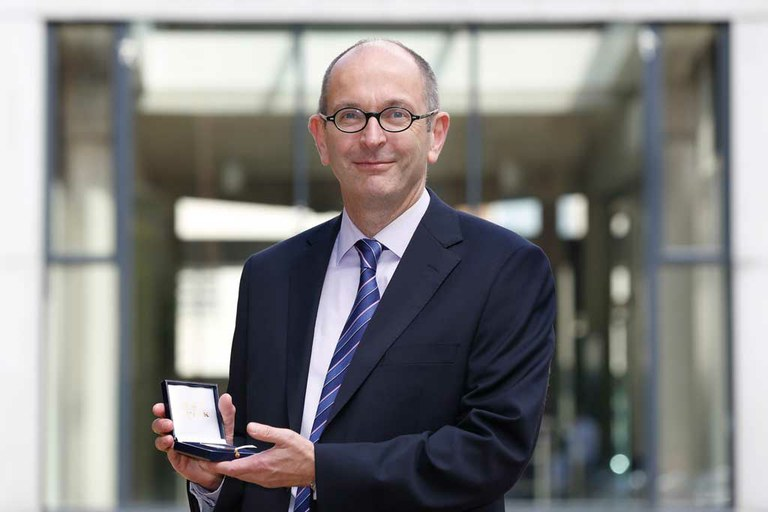
Paul Longley receiving his Victoria Medal in 2013

Recipients include:

- 1902: Ernst Georg Ravenstein, for his efforts during 40 years to introduce scientific methods into the cartography of the United Kingdom
- 1903: Sven Hedin, for his exploration in Central Asia
- 1905: John George Bartholomew, for his efforts to raise the standard of cartography.
- 1906: W. M. Ramsay, for his investigation of the Ancient Geography of Asia Minor
- 1909: Alexander Agassiz, for thirty years' work in oceanographical exploration
- 1911: Henry George Lyons, Egyptian Survey. For his investigations of the River Nile and its basin
- 1912: George H. Darwin, for his investigations on tides and in geodesy.
- 1913: Sidney Gerald Burrard Indian Survey. For his distinguished contributions to geography and geodesy.
- 1915: Hugh Robert Mill
- 1917: John Keltie
- 1919: John Walter Gregory
- 1920: Harold St. John Loyd Winterbotham
- 1922: John F. Baddeley
- 1924: John Fillmore Hayford
- 1927: Charles Close
- 1928: Edward Ayearst Reeves
- 1930: Emmanuel de Margerie
- 1932: Arthur Philemon Coleman
- 1934: Edward Heawood
- 1935: Edward James Wayland
- 1936: Stanley Wells Kemp
- 1938: Arthur Robert Hinks
- 1940: O. G. S. Crawford
- 1941: Harold Jeffreys
- 1946: Herbert John Fleure, for distinguished service in the advancement of geographical education and valuable researches into the human aspects of geography
- 1947: Eva G. R. Taylor
- 1948: Frank Debenham
- 1950: Emmanuel de Martonne
- 1951: Charles Cotton
- 1953: John Myres
- 1955: Sir John Russell, for his studies of soils and agriculture
- 1957: Sidney William Wooldridge
- 1958: Roberto Almagià
- 1959: Gerald Seligman
- 1960: James Alfred Steers
- 1962: Carl Troll
- 1963: Henry Clifford Darby
- 1964: John Norman Leonard Baker
- 1966: Gerald Roe Crone
- 1967: Charles W. Phillips
- 1968: Walter Christaller
- 1969: Marcel Aurousseau
- 1970: Raleigh Ashlin Skelton
- 1971: Oskar Spate
- 1972: George Henry John Daysh
- 1973: Emyr Estyn Evans
- 1974: Charles Alfred Fisher
- 1975: Carl O. Sauer
- 1976: Joseph Newell Jennings
- 1977: Emrys Jones
- 1978: Terence Armstrong
- 1979: Torsten Hägerstrand
- 1980: Jean Gottmann
- 1981: Julius Büdel
- 1982: Helmut J. Jusatz
- 1983: Bertram Hughes Farmer
- 1984: Richard Hartshorne
- 1985: John Terence Coppock
- 1986: Ren Mei'e
- 1987: Chauncy Harris
- 1988: Brian Berry
- 1989: David Simonett
- 1990: Ron Johnston
- 1991: John Clarke
- 1992: John Goddard
- 1993: Norman Graves
- 1994: Doreen Massey
- 1995: Helen Wallis
- 1996: Ronald Abler, for his contribution to human geography and enhancement of links between British and American geography
- 1997: David Lowenthal
- 1998: Ian Simmons
- 1999: Robin Butlin
- 2000: Desmond Walling
- 2001: Peter Dicken
- 2002: Angela Gurnell
- 2003: Nigel Thrift
- 2004: Michael Watts, for research on political economy, culture and power
- 2005: Ray Hudson, for research on regional and industrial change in the UK and wider Europe
- 2006: Jim Rose, for contributions to quaternary research
- 2007: Peter Jackson, for research on social geography
- 2008: Linda McDowell, for research in socio-economic and feminist geography
- 2009: Philip Rees, for research on population geography and demography
- 2010: Rick Battarbee, for research in environmental change
- 2011: John Lowe, for research in Quaternary Science.
- 2012: Stuart N. Lane, for research in physical geography and hydrological modelling.
- 2013: Paul A. Longley, for research in geographic information science.
- 2014: Susan Jane Smith, for research on geography
- 2015: Stephen Daniels, for research excellence in cultural geography
- 2016: Ron Martin, for research excellence in regional economic development
- 2017: Andrew Cliff, "for research excellence in spatial epidemiology"
- 2018: Wendy Larner, "for internationally leading research on globalisation and political economy"
- 2019: David Thomas, "for world leading research into dryland environments and societies"
- 2022 Paul Cloke Rural geography
- 2023 Anson Mackay For their transformative impact on the discipline of geography
- 2024: Lily Kong
- 2025: Gillian Rose

== See also ==
- List of geography awards
