= Charles-Moïse Briquet =

Swiss filigranologist

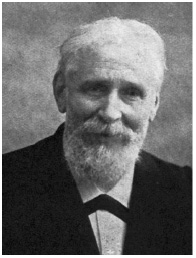
Charles-Moïse Briquet

Charles Moïse Briquet (30 August 1839, in Geneva – 24 January 1918, in Geneva) was a noted Swiss filigranologist. He was the first, or among the first, to suggest the use of watermarks for dating paper. He produced in 1907 the mammoth four-volume work Les Filigranes. His papers, including his collection of traced watermarks, are kept at the Bibliothèque de Genève.

== Works by Briquet that have been published in English ==
- "The Briquet Album : a miscellany on watermarks, supplementing Dr. Briquet's "Les filigranes", (1952).
- "Briquet's Opuscula; the complete works of Dr. C.M. Briquet without Les filigranes", (1955).
