= Frederick Goldring =

English photographer

Frederick "Fred" Goldring (1897 – 1997) was an English amateur photographer, and a recorder of churches and historic buildings.

Goldring was born in 1897 in Lee, Kent and he lived in the Weald from the age of three. From 1926–59, he ran the Timberscombe Guest House near Midhurst, West Sussex. It was much frequented after World War II by people on field courses led by the geologist, geomorphologist and geographer Sidney Wooldridge, of King's College London. Goldring was a hobby photographer with his own darkroom, whose pictures were published in guide books and at photographic exhibitions.

In 1953, he co-authored with Wooldridge The Weald, a book in the New Naturalist series. As of January 2015, he remains the only photographer to have been named as an author in that series. "[T]he match of plates and text in this book is a good deal better than average, and the splendid pictures have a consistency of style from being the work of a single person."

== Publications ==
- Wooldridge, S. W.; Goldring, F. The Weald. London: Collins. ASIN B0006CBUK6. New Naturalist No. 26.
