= Angela Gurnell =

British geoscientist

- Education: University of Exeter
- Scientific career
- Workplaces: University of Southampton; University of Birmingham; King's College London; Queen Mary University of London

Angela Gurnell is a British geoscientist who is Professor of Physical Geography at Queen Mary University of London. Her research considers hydrology, geomorphology and plant ecology. She is particularly interested in how vegetations and fluvial processes interact, and developing novel methodologies to monitor and assess rivers. She was awarded the Royal Geographical Society Victoria Medal in 2002 and the European Geosciences Union Alfred Wegener medal in 2021.

== Early life and education ==
Gurnell was an undergraduate student at the University of Exeter. She remained in Exeter for her doctoral research, during which she became interested in hydrology. She was particularly interested in hydrological mapping. After graduating she joined the faculty at the University of Southampton.

== Research and career ==
At Southampton, Gurnell was appointed Senior Lecturer and eventually promoted to Reader. She was awarded a personal chair at the University of Birmingham in 1995, where she stayed until she joined King's College London in 2002. She was Head of Department at King's College until 2006. In 2010 Gurnell left King's College to join Queen Mary University of London.

Gurnell became interested in the interaction between vegetation and fluvial processes. She started studying the role of aquatic and riparian plants at landform and river-reach scales. Gurnell believes that these plants are engineers of river ecosystems, impacting the development of landforms (so-called morphodynamics). She was a pioneer in better understanding riparian vegetation. The complex root systems developed by riparian trees can act to reinforce fluvial landforms. In low gradient, lowland rivers aquatic plants determine the bed morphology and channel migration. She has systematically evaluated how large wood is transported through river systems.

Gurnell was one of the founders of the Urban River Survey, which analyses hundreds of metres of urban rivers, and the modular river survey, which studies rivers at various spatial scales. Both tools allow members of the public and river conservation professionals to collect information about river behaviour, and aim to limit damage to nature.

== Awards and honours ==
- 2002 Victoria Medal
- 2012 British Society for Geomorphology Linton Award
- 2021 Alfred Wegener Medal & Honorary Membership

== Selected publications ==
- Corenblit, Dov; Tabacchi, Eric; Steiger, Johannes; Gurnell, Angela M. (2007). "Reciprocal interactions and adjustments between fluvial landforms and vegetation dynamics in river corridors: A review of complementary approaches". Earth-Science Reviews. 84 (1–2): 56–86. Bibcode:2007ESRv...84...56C. doi:10.1016/j.earscirev.2007.05.004. ISSN 0012-8252.
- GURNELL, A. M.; PIÉGAY, H.; SWANSON, F. J.; GREGORY, S. V. (2002). "Large wood and fluvial processes". Freshwater Biology. 47 (4): 601–619. doi:10.1046/j.1365-2427.2002.00916.x. ISSN 0046-5070.
- Gurnell, Angela (16 April 2013). "Plants as river system engineers". Earth Surface Processes and Landforms. 39 (1): 4–25. doi:10.1002/esp.3397. ISSN 0197-9337. S2CID 55420478.
