= Joseph Holden (geographer) =

British geographer

- Born: 27 December 1975 (age 50)
- Education: Fitzwilliam College, Cambridge (MA); Durham University (PhD)
- Awards: Philip Leverhulme Prize (2007)
- Scientific career
- Institutions: University of Leeds
- Thesis: Runoff production in blanket peat covered catchments (2000)
- Doctoral advisor: Tim Burt
- Website: environment.leeds.ac.uk/geography/staff/1049/professor-joseph-holden

Joseph Holden (born 26 December 1975) is a British physical geographer who specialises in hydrological research, geomorphology and land management. He is Professor of Physical Geography at the University of Leeds.

== Early life and education ==
Holden was born in Gateshead, Tyne and Wear. He read Geography at Fitzwilliam College, Cambridge, receiving a BA (later upgraded to MA) in 1997 and he subsequently completed his PhD at Durham University in 2000.

== Academic career ==
After finishing his PhD, Holden joined the University of Leeds as a teaching fellow. He became Lecturer in Physical Geography in 2005, Reader the following year and Professor of Physical Geography in 2007. At the time he was the youngest full professor in the country.

Holden is one of the programme directors of a UK Research and Innovation project looking into river pollution.

== Honours ==
Holden was a recipient of the 2007 Philip Leverhulme Prize and in 2011 was awarded the Gordon Warwick Medal by the British Society for Geomorphology.

== Selected publications ==
=== Books ===
- Holden, Joseph (2017). An Introduction to Physical Geography and the Environment (4th ed.). Pearson Education. ISBN 978-1292083575.
- ——— (2019). Water Resources: An Integrated Approach (2nd ed.). Routledge. ISBN 978-1138329218.
- ——— (2021). Physical Geography: The Basics (2nd ed.). Routledge. ISBN 978-0367642716.

=== Articles ===
- Holden, J.; Burt, T. P. (2003). "Hydrological studies on blanket peat: the significance of the acrotelm–catotelm model". Journal of Ecology. 91 (1): 103–113. doi:10.1046/j.1365-2745.2003.00748.x.
- ——— (2005). "Peatland hydrology and carbon release: why small-scale process matters" (PDF). Philosophical Transactions of the Royal Society A. 363 (1837): 2891–2913. doi:10.1098/rsta.2005.1671.
- ———; Shotbolt, L.; Bonn, A.; et al. (2007). "Environmental change in moorland landscapes". Earth-Science Reviews. 82 (1–2): 75–100. doi:10.1016/j.earscirev.2007.01.003.
- Acreman, Mike; Holden, Joseph (2013). "How wetlands affect floods". Wetlands. 33: 773–786. doi:10.1007/s13157-013-0473-2.
- Xu, Jiren; Morris, Paul J.; Liu, Junguo; Holden, Joseph (2018). "PEATMAP: Refining estimates of global peatland distribution based on a meta-analysis" (PDF). Catena. 160: 134–140. doi:10.1016/j.catena.2017.09.010.
