= Kevin F. Kiley =

Kevin F. Kiley is an American military historian and uniformologist.

Kiley is a graduate of United States Military Academy at West Point and served as an artillery officer in the United States Marine Corps during the Gulf War. He has a master's degree in military history from Norwich University.

Kiley has written on the Napoleonic Wars as well as several volumes on military uniforms.
