= Cecil Hugh Tyndale-Biscoe =

Australian zoologist

Cecil Hugh Tyndale-Biscoe AM FAA
- Born: 16 October 1929 (age 96); Srinagar, Kashmir
- Occupation: Zoologist

Cecil Hugh (Hugh) Tyndale-Biscoe AM FAA (born 16 October 1929 Srinagar, Kashmir) is an Australian zoologist. He was Chief Research Scientist, CSIRO Division of Wildlife and Rangelands Research from 1978 to 1992.

== Awards ==
- Clarke Medal (1974)
- Fellow of the Australian Academy of Science (1986)
- Member of the Order of Australia (AM) (Australia Day 2018 Honours List)

Awards
Preceded by Marshall Hatch	Clarke Medal; 1974	Succeeded by Joseph Newell Jennings
