= David Thomas (geographer) =

British scientist and geographer

David S. G. Thomas is a British scientist and geographer. He was born at his parents' home in River, near Dover, Kent, UK, in October 1958. He is Professor of geography at the University of Oxford, the fifth person to hold the Statuary Chair, and a Professorial Fellow of Hertford College, Oxford.

== Career and research ==
His research deals with desertification, dryland environments, climate change and other environmental phenomena. Recent research has focussed on desert geoarchaeology, dryland bioenergy and long-term environmental change in deserts. He received his D.Phil. from the University of Oxford. Between 1984 and 2004 he taught and researched at the University of Sheffield, where he rose from lecturer to senior lecturer then full professor by 1994, and was head of department. he has authored many scientific papers (over 200 by 2022) and 11 books including second and third editions. He has been vice-president of the Royal Geographical Society (twice) and president of the British Geomorphological Research Group (now British Society for Geomorphology. His research interests have seen significant activity in Africa, especially in the Kalahari and Namib Deserts and surrounding areas, and in Arabia and India.

== Awards ==
In 2011 he received the Farouk El-Baz Award from the Geological Society of America for his contributions to desert science.

He received the Royal Geographical Society's Victoria Medal in 2018 for his world-leading research in desert environments and desert societies.

== Books ==
- Thomas, David S. G. Desertification: exploding the myth / David S. G. Thomas and Nicholas J. Middleton. Chichester; New York: Wiley, c1994. xii, 194 p.: ill., maps; 24 cm. ISBN 0-471-94815-2
- Sustainable livelihoods in Kalahari environments: a contribution to global debates / edited by Deborah Sporton and David S.G. Thomas. Oxford; New York: Oxford University Press, 2002. xix, 231 p.: ill., maps; 24 cm. ISBN 0-19-823419-8 (alk. paper)
- Arid zone geomorphology / edited by David S.G. Thomas. London: Belhaven Press; New York: Halsted Press, 1989. vi, 372 p.: ill.; 26 cm. ISBN 0-470-21341-8 (Halsted Press. 2nd edition (published by John wiley and Sons 1998. 3rd edition as 'Arid Zone Geomorphology: process, Form and Change in Drylands 2011.ISBN 978-0-470-51909-7
- United Nations Environment Programme. World atlas of desertification / UNEP; co-ordinating editors, Nick Middleton and David Thomas. 2nd ed. London; New York: Arnold; New York: Copublished in the US, Central and South America by John Wiley, c1997. 1 atlas (x, 182 p.): ill. (some col.), maps (some col.); 37 cm. ISBN 0-340-69166-2 (UNEP), ISBN 0-470-24972-2 (Wiley)
- The Kalahari Environment David S.G. Thomas and Paul A. Shaw Cambridge University Press, 1991. xiii, 275 p.: ill., maps. ISBN 0-521-37080-9

== Other roles ==
Amongst his many professional roles, he chaired the Geography and Environmental Studies for the UK's Research Excellence Framework (REF) 2021 from 2017 to 2022.
