= Bernard John Smith =

Professor Bernard John Smith BSc PhD CGeog
- Born: 21 March 1951; Dorset, England
- Died: 31 October 2012 (aged 61); Belfast, Northern Ireland
- Education: University of Reading
- Occupations: University lecturer and scientist
- Known for: Studies in geomorphology, especially building stone weathering
- Spouse: Dorothy Rossiter (m. 1974)
- Children: 2

Professor Bernard John Smith (21 March 1951 – 31 October 2012) was an English geomorphologist and a physical geographer. He was born in the English village of Beer in Dorset where he attended school until the family's relocation to London.

== Early career ==
He studied Geography at the University of Reading and graduated in 1971. He continued at the university as a research student under the supervision of Dr. Colin Mitchell. His research work was geomorphological mapping and process studies in Tunisia. He graduated with his PhD from the University of Reading in 1975 and relocated to Nigeria with Dorothy, his wife, where he taught at Ahmadu Bello University, Zaria. On his return to the UK (via Land Rover across the Sahara) he took up a lecturing position in the Geography Department of Queen's University Belfast in 1979. This provided the academic base for the rest of his career. He was appointed Senior Lecturer, Reader and finally held the Chair in Tropical Geomorphology in 1998. He continued at the post until illness necessitated an early retirement in 2011.

== Research ==
Bernard Smith's first publications were on desert geomorphology and on the formation of desert dust and loess. His interest in desert weathering then developed into the study of building stone decay, linking architecture, urban planning, cultural heritage, and other aspects of human geography into his work. His first work on this was in Venice and then developed to investigate on pollution-related weathering in the UK, Hungary and Brazil.

He established the weathering research group in the early 1990s in the school of Geography, Archaeology and Paleoecology at Queen's University Belfast (QUB) Website. The focus of this group was on improving understanding of stone weathering in both natural and built environments and resulted in Bernard Smith's involvement with local conservation architects and the wider building conservation and restoration communities in the UK, Europe and further afield. In his later years, he played a role in understanding the impact of climate change on the UK's stone-built heritage and new build.

Bernard Smith supervised the launch of many geomorphological careers as a PhD supervisor at the University of Belfast and served time on the Executive Committee of the British Society for Geomorphology (BSG). During this time he was an organizer and facilitator of the 'Windsor Workshop' for new research students run by the BSG. He became Vice Chair of the BSG and Chair in 2011.

In a 2012 eulogy, Patricia Warke, a colleague from Queen's University Belfast summarised Smith's work by saying: "His research interests were wide and varied but were rooted in his love of hot deserts and tropical landscapes and his desire to better understand the processes that shape them.

Whilst the interpretation and exploration of landscapes formed the central core of Bernie's career, his fascination with process studies and weathering processes led him onto some of his most significant geomorphological work and establishment of the Weathering Research Group in the early 1990s in the School of Geography, Archaeology and Palaeoecology at Queen’s."

== Bibliography ==
- Gómez-Heras, M., Smith, B.J. and Fort, R.(2006) Surface temperature differences between minerals in crystalline rocks: implications for granular disaggregation of granites through thermal fatigue. Geomorphology, 78: 236–249.
- McGreevy, J. P. and B. J. Smith (1982). "Salt weathering in hot deserts: observations on the design of simulation experiments." Geografiska Annaler. Series A. Physical Geography: 161–170.
- Smith, B. (2009). "Weathering processes and forms." Geomorphology of desert environments: 69–100.
- Smith, B. and J. McGreevy (2006). "Contour scaling of a sandstone by salt weathering under simulated hot desert conditions." Earth Surface Processes and Landforms 13(8): 697–705.
- Smith, B. J., P. A. Warke, et al. (2005). "Salt-weathering simulations under hot desert conditions: agents of enlightenment or perpetuators of preconceptions?" Geomorphology 67(1–2): 211–227.
- Smith, B.J., Wright, J. S. and Whalley W.B. (2002) Sources of non-glacial loess-size quartz silt and the origins of 'desert loess'. Earth-Science Reviews, 59: 1–26.
- Smith, B.J., Turkington, A.V., Warke, P.A., Basheer, P.A.M., McAlister, J.J., Meneely, J. and Curran J.M. (2005) Modelling the rapid retreat of building sandstones. A case study from a polluted maritime environment. Geological Society of London Special Publication, 205: 339–354.
- Smith, B.J., Warke, P.A., McGreevy, J.P and Kane, H.L. (2006) Salt weathering simulations under hot desert conditions: agents of enlightenment or perpetuators of preconceptions? Geomorphology, 67: 211–227.
- Smith, B.J., Warke, P.A. Stone by Stone: a guide to building stone in the Northern Ireland environment. Appletree Press.
- Warke, P., B. Smith, et al. (1996). "Thermal response characteristics of stone: implications for weathering of soiled surfaces in urban environments." Earth Surface Processes and Landforms 21(3): 295–306.
- Whalley, W.B., Marshall, J., Smith, B.J. (1982). "Origin of desert loess from some experimental observations." Nature 300, 433 – 435 (2 December 1982); doi:10.1038/300433a0
- Smith, B. J., McCabe, S., McAllister, D., Adamson, C., Viles, H. A. & Curran, J. M. (2011). A commentary on climate change, stone decay dynamics and the 'greening' of natural stone buildings: new perspectives on 'deep wetting'. Environmental Earth Sciences 63: 1691 – 1700.
- Smith, B. J., Srinivasan, S., McCabe, S., McAllister, D., Cutler, N., M. Basheer, P.A.M. & Viles, H. A. (2011). Climate change and the investigation of complex moisture regimes in heritage stone: preliminary observations on possible strategies. Materials Evaluation: January 2011, 48 – 58.
- Smith, B. J., Gomez-Heras, M. & McCabe, S. (2008). Understanding the decay of stone-built cultural heritage. Progress in Physical Geography 32: 439 – 461.
- McCabe, S., Smith, B. J., McAlister, J. J., Gomez-Heras, M., McAllister, D., Warke, P. A., Curran, J. M. & Basheer, P. A. M. (2013). Changing climate, changing process: implications for salt transportation and weathering within building sandstones in the UK. Environmental Earth Sciences 69(4): 1225–1235
