= Auxiliary sciences of history =

Scholarly disciplines in historical research

Auxiliary (or ancillary) sciences of history are scholarly disciplines which help evaluate and use historical sources and are seen as auxiliary for historical research. Many of these areas of study, classification and analysis were originally developed between the 16th and 19th centuries by antiquaries, and would then have been regarded as falling under the broad heading of antiquarianism. "History" was at that time regarded as a largely literary skill. However, with the spread of the principles of empirical source-based history championed by the Göttingen school of history in the late 18th century and later by Leopold von Ranke from the mid-19th century onwards, they have been increasingly regarded as falling within the skill-set of the trained historian.

== Examples ==
Auxiliary sciences of history include, but are not limited to:

- Archaeology, the study of human activity through the recovery and analysis of material culture
- Archival science, the study and theory of creating and maintaining archives
- Chorography, the describing or mapping of regions and places
- Chronology, the study of the sequence of past events
- Cliometrics, the systematic application of economic theory, econometric techniques, and other formal or mathematical methods to the study of history
- Codicology, the study of books as physical objects
- Diplomatics, the study and textual analysis of historical documents
- Encyclopaedistics (or encyclopedistics), the study of encyclopaedias as sources of encyclopaedic knowledge
- Epigraphy, the study of ancient inscriptions
- Ethnography, the study of individual cultures
- Filigranology, the study of watermarks
- Genealogy, the study of family relationships
- Historical geography, the study of change regarding geographic phenomena
- Heraldry, the study of armorial devices
- Iconography, the study of images
- Numismatics, the study of coins
- Onomastics, the study of proper names
- Palaeography, the study of historic handwriting and manuscripts
- Paleoanthropology, the study of human evolution and ecology through the fossil record
- Phaleristics, the study of military orders, fraternities, and awards
- Philately, the study of postage stamps
- Philology, the study of the language of historical sources
- Prosopography, the investigation of a historical group of individuals through a collective study of their lives
- Sigillography (or sphragistics), the study of seals
- Textology, the study of describing, transcribing, editing, or annotating historical texts
- Toponymy, the study of place names
- Uniformology, the study of uniforms (especially military uniforms)
- Vexillology, the study of flags

Several of these are disciplines or sub-disciplines of major social sciences, especially:

- Anthropology, the study of the development of humanity and culture (see also: Physical anthropology)
- Linguistics, the study of language and its uses (see also: Historical linguistics)
- Sociology, the study of societal behavior, groups, and relationships

Some fields of study are also interdisciplinary, such as historical archaeography, encompassing the study of various codicological, textological, palaeographical, and other mutually correlated aspects and properties of ancient manuscripts and early printed materials.
