= Peter Dicken =

English economic geographer (born 1938)

- Born: Peter Dicken; 1938 (age 87–88); England
- Education: MA (Manchester), PhD (Uppsala), AcSS.
- Occupation: Emeritus Professor
- Known for: Academic Research into Globalisation

Peter Dicken (born 1938) is an English economic geographer whose research focuses on processes and patterns in globalisation. He joined the University of Manchester in 1966 after completing an MA there. He is currently an emeritus professor at the same university, to which he has dedicated his academic life, continuing research on global patterns of business and globalisation. His self-described area is "the changing multi-scalar geographies of the global economy and on the structures and dynamics of global production networks, particularly the relationships between transnational corporations and states".

In the Spring of 1999, Dicken was a Fellow at the Swedish Collegium for Advanced Study in Uppsala, Sweden.

== Career ==
Throughout his career Peter Dicken has been involved in the following positions:

- Academic at the University of Manchester (1966–present)
- Visiting academic professorships from universities in North America, Europe, Australia and East Asia
- Co-director of European Science Foundation – ‘Scientific Programme on Regional and Urban Restructuring in Europe’ (1989–1994)
- Consultant advisor to the UNCTAD commission on transnational corporations (1993–1994)
- Editorial positions on international journal boards
- Former managing editor of progress in human geography

Dicken's research areas have involved:

- Global economic geographies of change
- Trans-national corporation's impacts within the world economy
- Economic development in East Asia – exploring business networks and production chains
- Global economic change in different economic scales – involving global to local

== Awards ==
Dicken was awarded a personal chair in 1988, recognising the professor status of his achievements and research in economic geographies.

He was awarded the Victoria Medal of the Royal Geographical Society with the Institute of British Geographers in 2001 for "advancing research on globalization and economic geography". He received an honorary doctorate from the University of Uppsala, Sweden, in 2002. He was also awarded the Centenary Medal of the Royal Scottish Geographical Society in 2007 for "distinguished contributions to the study of the geographies of the global economy".

== Contribution and legacy ==
Peter Dicken's Global Shift, his most widely cited work, has sold tens of thousands of copies over the last 30 years. He has been called "one of the most influential economic geographers in the discipline over the last 30 years". His uncontroversial approach to his research is one reason his works remain so popular within the discipline. He was among the first to point to the significance of TNCs, providing detailed analysis of their role in the world economy as a barometer for global economic change.

Dicken provided a greater understanding of chains and network structures, in particular by understanding the role, locational behaviour and organisation of Japanese capital and firms in Western economies. His work on the economic restructuring of Japanese firms regarding the Just-In-Time production process is widely cited. Through his work, he was able to explain global economic change in relation to global-local dialect.

== Key publications ==
- "Location in Space: a Theoretical Approach to Economic Geography", with Peter E. Lloyd, 1972 (3 editions)
- "Global Shift", 1986 (7 Editions)
