= Alan Tyson =

British musicologist

- Born: Alan Walker; 27 October 1926; Glasgow, Scotland
- Died: 10 November 2000 (aged 74)
- Known for: Publications in musicology

Alan Walker Tyson, CBE, FBA (27 October 1926 – 10 November 2000) was a Glasgow-born British musicologist who specialized in studies of the music of Wolfgang Amadeus Mozart and Ludwig van Beethoven. Tyson was Senior Research Fellow at All Souls College, Oxford, and a Fellow of the British Academy.

== The watermark studies ==
One of his most celebrated publications was Mozart: Studies of the Autograph Scores (1987), whose chapters detailed the study of watermarks in Mozart's autographs as a method of dating his compositions. Tyson begins (Chapter 1) with remarks on papermaking and watermarks, explaining why the watermarks are patterned in a nontrivial way that makes it tricky to use them for identification without exercising suitable care. The paper makers of Mozart's day worked in pairs, alternating the use of two molds, each imprinting its own watermark; so even if the two molds used the same basic watermark design, there would still be differences of detail between them. Further, the completed sheet of paper was large, and was typically folded and cut before being used for writing music. Hence the watermark expert must comprehend the watermarks of multiple pages, piece them together, and then figure out the pairing of molds, before arriving at any firm conclusions. Beyond this, a watermark scholar must know the sorts of watermarks that were used by papermakers in any particular region; this requires knowledge of the scholarly literature in filigranology, the discipline of historical watermark study. One example of watermark scholarship is the following: the appearance of three crescent moons on a watermark turns out to have almost no value for identifying paper, since this device appeared on the watermarks of a great many paper makers, as a way of designating quality. On the other hand, the widespread use of crescent moons made possible the invention of what Tyson jokingly called "selenometry," the identification of paper types through the careful measurement of the distances between and within the moons.

A supplement to the watermark data was rastrology: the little machines used to draw the staves for music-writing would often leave traces, for instance in the spacing of the staves, or in one of the five lines being longer or shorter than the others.

With such evidence, Tyson was able to develop a coherent chronology of what kinds of paper Mozart was buying and using throughout his career, including a rough characterization of where he bought it. This in turn produced in many cases reliable conclusions about what Mozart wrote when.

Tyson's book represented a major advance in Mozart scholarship, since, rather unusually for so long after Mozart's lifetime, it brought considerable new data onto the scene. The watermark studies revealed quite a few earlier misdatings of works by Mozart, made by scholars who had no deep understanding of how watermarks work (see above), or who recklessly attempted to assign precise dates to works solely on stylistic grounds. The book also established a major change in scholars' conception of how Mozart did his work, for it emerged that a fair number of his works had been written in only part, then shelved for quite some time before being finished, perhaps when a performance or publication opportunity arose.

Among the particular discoveries made by Tyson in the course of this work are the following:

- The true ending to the Rondo in A for Piano and Orchestra, K. 386, which previously had only been known in a completion arranged for solo piano by Cipriani Potter and published in 1837.
- That the standard version of the second movement of Mozart's Horn Concerto in D, K. 412/514, was actually completed after Mozart's death by his pupil Franz Xaver Süssmayr.
- The true date of origin for the "Prussian" quartets, completed 1790, for which one of the three paper types puzzled earlier scholars. This paper is "thick and grayish" (Tyson 1987:42), had ten staves (Mozart generally preferred twelve, certainly for quartets), and had a then-unfamiliar watermark. The musicologists Alfred Einstein and Alec Hyatt King, mistaking this paper for a much earlier type, advanced the theory that these works were completions of quartets that Mozart had started and abandoned as a teenager, perhaps as early as 1770. More specifically, these scholars judged that Mozart chose these (putative) earlier sketches as his compositional starting point because he was disenchanted with his task, which was to write a set of quartets for the King of Prussia, whom he visited in 1789. Tyson traced the mystery paper to a mill in present-day Dolní Poustevna in the Czech Republic, not far from either Dresden or Prague, both of them cities on Mozart's route homeward from Berlin. The conclusions drawn by Tyson are that (1) The quartets were begun in the year one might expect, i.e. 1789, and (2) Mozart was willing, possibly even eager, to get going on his task; i.e. while traveling southward, he ran out of paper and bought a locally-available variety.

The essential tool that emerged from and guided the watermark studies, Tyson's catalogue of watermark types, was published as part of the Neue Mozart-Ausgabe and may be viewed on line.

== Other research ==
He wrote the (deliberately concise) Thematic catalogue of the works of Muzio Clementi which appeared in 1967 at Hans Schneider of Tutzing/Germany, with no following editions up to date.

Additionally, Tyson edited a noteworthy series of volumes entitled Beethoven Studies. His interest in watermarks and paper studies on Beethoven scores actually predated his involvement in those of Mozart.

Prior to becoming intensely involved in musicology, Tyson was lecturer in Psychopathology and Developmental Psychology at Oxford from 1968 to 1970. He was co-editor of The Standard Edition of the Complete Psychological Works of Sigmund Freud for which he also translated some texts, notably Leonardo da Vinci, A Memory of His Childhood and The Psychopathology of Everyday Life. He had read Classical Moderations and Greats at the University of Oxford, and medicine at University College Hospital.

== Sources ==
- Alan Tyson (Obituary), The Guardian, 14 November 2000.
- Leaver, Robin A. (2016) Bach’s Choral-Buch? The Significance of a Manuscript in the Sibley Library. In Matthew Dirst, ed., Bach and the Organ. Urbana: University of Illinois Press.
- Alan Tyson, Mozart: Studies of the Autograph Scores, Cambridge, MA: Harvard University Press, 1987. ISBN 0-674-58831-2.
  - Ch. 17, "The Rondo for Piano and Orchestra, K. 386" (pp. 262–289), presents Tyson's discovery of Mozart's original ending.
  - Ch. 16, "Mozart's D Major Horn Concerto: Questions of Date and of Authenticity" (pp. 246–261) deals with Tyson's findings regarding K. 412/514.
