= Paul Longley =

British geographer (born 1959)

Professor Paul Longley FAcSS
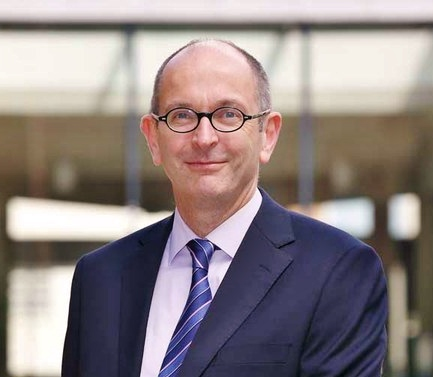
- Paul Longley (Photograph courtesy: Royal Geographical Society)
- Born: February 26, 1959 (age 67)
- Occupation: British Geographer

Paul A. Longley is a British geographer. He is professor of geographic information science (GISci) at University College London (UCL), UK, where he also directs the ESRC Consumer Data Research Centre. Prior to joining UCL in July 2000, he was the professor of geography at the University of Bristol.

His research interests are developed around socioeconomic applications of GIScience, and have included projects based on topics such as: geo-temporal demographics and social media usage, fractal analysis of cities, geo-genealogy of family names, retail geography analytics and the effectiveness of public service delivery (specifically health, education and policing). His publications include 18 books and over 150 contributions to refereed journal articles, edited collections and book chapters. He is past editor-in-chief of the academic journal Computers, Environment and Urban Systems and a past co-editor of Environment and Planning B.

He teaches Geographic Information Science and Systems and is a co-author of the best-selling book of that name. He has been involved in the postgraduate supervision of over 50 Ph.D. students. He is a regular contributor to internationally conferences and has held eleven externally funded visiting appointments, and has many extensive teaching commitments.

In 2013 he was awarded the Royal Geographical Society Victoria Medal.

== Appointments ==
- 2000–Present - Professor of Geographic Information Science, University College London (2003-4 - seconded to ESRC Advanced Institute for Management Research Senior Fellowship)
- 1996-2000 - Professor of Geography, University of Bristol
- 1994-96 - Reader in Geography, University of Bristol (including a period as an ESRC Research Fellow, 1994–95)
- 1992-94 - Lecturer in Geography, University of Bristol
- 1984-92 - Lecturer in Planning, Cardiff University (UWIST prior to 1/9/88)
- 1983 84 Lecturer in Geography, University of Reading

== Education & Qualifications ==
- 1997 - D.Sc., University of Bristol
- 1984 - Ph.D. (Urban Geography), University of Bristol
- 1980 - B.Sc. First Class Honours (Geography), University of Bristol

== Special Awards, Honours & Distinctions ==
- 2013 - Royal Geographical Society Victoria Medal
- 2010 - Visiting Professor, University of Tokyo
- 2008 - Visiting Professor, University College Dublin
- 2007, 2009, 2011, 2013 - Visiting Professor, Ritsumeikan University, Japan
- 2002 - Registered Practitioner, the Higher Education Academy (previously the ILTHE)
- 2002 - Elected Academician, Academy of Social Sciences (Academy of Learned Societies for the Social Sciences prior to 2007)
- 1980 - University of Bristol Miller Barstow Prize for best undergraduate social science dissertation
- 1980 - Walter Scheel Scholarship
