= Joseph Newell Jennings =

Australian geomorphologist

- Born: June 29, 1916; Wortley, Leeds, West Yorkshire, England
- Died: August 24, 1984 (aged 68); Eucumbene, New South Wales, Australia
- Occupation: geomorphologist

Joseph Newell (Joe) Jennings (29 June 1916 – 24 August 1984) was an Australian geomorphologist.

He was born in Wortley, Leeds, West Yorkshire, England and educated at the Oldershaw School for Boys, Wallasey, Cheshire then studied geography at St Catharine's College, Cambridge. In 1952 he was appointed reader in geomorphology at the Australian National University. He was appointed professorial fellow in 1966 and was a foundation member of the department of biogeography and geomorphology in 1968.

== Awards ==
- Clarke Medal, awarded by the Royal Society of New South Wales (1975)
- Victoria Medal, awarded by the Royal Geographical Society (1976)

Awards
Preceded by Cecil Hugh Tyndale-Biscoe	Clarke Medal; 1975	Succeeded by Lilian Ross Fraser
