= Phil Rees (geographer) =

Phillip Howell Rees CBE FRGS, FBA (born 17 September 1944) is a British population geographer and demographer. He is currently Emeritus Professor of Population Geography at the University of Leeds.

== Biography ==
Born in Wales, he was educated at St Catharine's College, Cambridge, where he graduated with a double first in Geography in 1966 (MA 1970). He went on to the University of Chicago where he gained an MA in Geography in 1968 and a Ph.D. in 1973 under the supervision of Brian Berry.

On 1 October 1970 Phil joined the School of Geography in the University of Leeds helping drive the new wave of quantitative geography in Britain with colleagues including Alan Wilson (who joined the department on the very same day). A prolific author of research papers and books on many aspects of human population problems, between 1992 and 2002 he was also co-ordinator of the ESRC/Jisc Census of Population Programme.

Retiring from teaching in 2009, Phil's contribution to geography was marked with a symposium celebrating the lasting international impact his work has had. Although retired from teaching he remains extremely active in research.

In 1996 he was awarded the Gill Memorial Award from the Royal Geographical Society, in 1998 was made a fellow of the British Academy, in 2004 appointed as a Commander of The Most Excellent Order of the British Empire and in 2009 he was awarded the Victoria Medal from the Royal Geographical Society.
