= Robin Butlin =

British emeritus professor of geography

Robin Alan Butlin OBE FRGS (born 1938) is emeritus professor of geography, and visiting research fellow, based in the School of Geography at the University of Leeds. Butlin was a professor of historical geography and started work at Leeds in 1998 as a visiting professor of geography after working as principal and professor of historical geography at the University College of Ripon and York St John in York.

== Academic posts ==
- 2003 to present emeritus professor of geography, and visiting research fellow, School of Geography, University of Leeds
- 2000 to 2003 Professor of historical geography (part-time), School of Geography, University of Leeds, Leeds, U.K.
- 1998 to 2000 Visiting professor of geography, School of Geography, University of Leeds, Leeds, U.K.
- 1998 to 1999 Associate lecturer, Department of Geography, University of Cambridge, Cambridge, U.K.
- 1995 to 1998 Principal and professor of historical geography, University College of Ripon and York St John, York, U.K.
- 1986 to 1987 Visiting professorial fellow and Leverhulme research fellow, Wolfson College, Cambridge, U.K.
- 1983 to 1986 Dean, School (Faculty) of Human and Environmental Studies, Loughborough University of Technology, Loughborough, U.K.
- 1979 to 1995 Professor of geography, Loughborough University of Technology, Loughborough, U.K.
- 1971 to 1979 Lecturer in geography, Queen Mary College, University of London (Senior lecturer from 1975, reader in historical geography from 1977), London, U.K.
- 1970 (Summer School) Visiting associate professor, Department of Geography, Hayward State University, California, U.S.A.
- 1969 to 1970 Visiting associate professor of geography, University of Nebraska–Lincoln, Nebraska, U.S.A.
- 1965 (One term) Visiting associate professor, Department of Geography, Miami University, Oxford, Ohio, U.S.A.
- 1962 to 1971 Lecturer in geography, University College, Dublin, Dublin, Ireland
- 1961 to 1962 Demonstrator in geography, University College of North Staffordshire, Keele, U.K.

== Qualifications and education ==
- 1987 D.Litt. conferred by Loughborough University, for published work in Historical Geography, submitted under the title Studies in Historical Geography.
- 1959 to 1961 M.A. (by research), Geography, University of Liverpool. Thesis on The Evolution of the Agrarian Landscape of Northumberland, 1500–1900.
- 1956 to 1959 B.A. (Upper Second Class Honours), Geography, University of Liverpool. Jointly Awarded P.M. Roxby Memorial Prize for best student dissertation, on the Historical Geography of the Brue Valley of Central Somerset.

== Membership of learned societies ==
- Royal Geographical Society with the Institute of British Geographers
- Association of American Geographers
- Royal Scottish Geographical Society
- Geographical Society of Ireland
- British Economic History Society
- British Agricultural History Society
- Palestine Exploration Fund
- Geographical Association
- European Conference for the Study of Rural Landscape

== Awards and appointments ==
- 2004 Appointed O.B.E. 'for services to geography'.
- 2002 Chair, Yorkshire regional committee of the Royal Geographical Society with the Institute of British Geographers
- 1999 Awarded Victoria Medal by the Royal Geographical Society with the Institute of British Geographers, for contributions to historical geography
- 1995-98 vice-president, Research and Higher Education Division, Royal Geographical Society with the Institute of British Geographers
