= Chinese Geographical Society =

The Chinese Geographical Society (CGS) is an academic society in the field of geography in the Republic of China, founded in Nanjing in 1934 and resumed in Taiwan in 1951.

== Overview ==
In 1934, Weng Wen-hao, Zhu Kezhen and Zhang Qi-yun formally founded the Chinese Geographical Society in Nanjing, with Weng Wen-hao as the first president. In 1951, the Chinese Geographical Society was re-established in Taiwan under the name of "Resumption", and the first general meeting was held in Taiwan. 1977, the Society was registered with the Ministry of the Interior of the Republic of China.

The Chinese Geographical Society is a full member of the International Geographical Society, and is one of the few societies in the Republic of China that currently has official membership in international academic institutions.
