= Filigranology =

Study of Watermarks

Filigranology is the study of watermarks. It is usually pursued in order to discover information about the date and origin for a paper-based piece of writing or a piece of art. There are several catalogues of watermarks – most notably C. M. Briquet's, Les Filigranes (1907), which dealt mainly with the period up to 1600, and Edward Heawood's Watermarks, Mainly of the 17th and 18th Centuries (1950), both of which include illustrations of many watermarks from dated documents. These catalogues form an important resource for researchers.

== See also ==
- Alan Tyson. British musicologist who used filigranology to find the true date for many of the works of Wolfgang Amadeus Mozart.
