= Uniformology =

Study of uniforms

Uniformology is a branch of the auxiliary sciences of history which studies uniforms – especially military uniforms – through ages and civilizations.

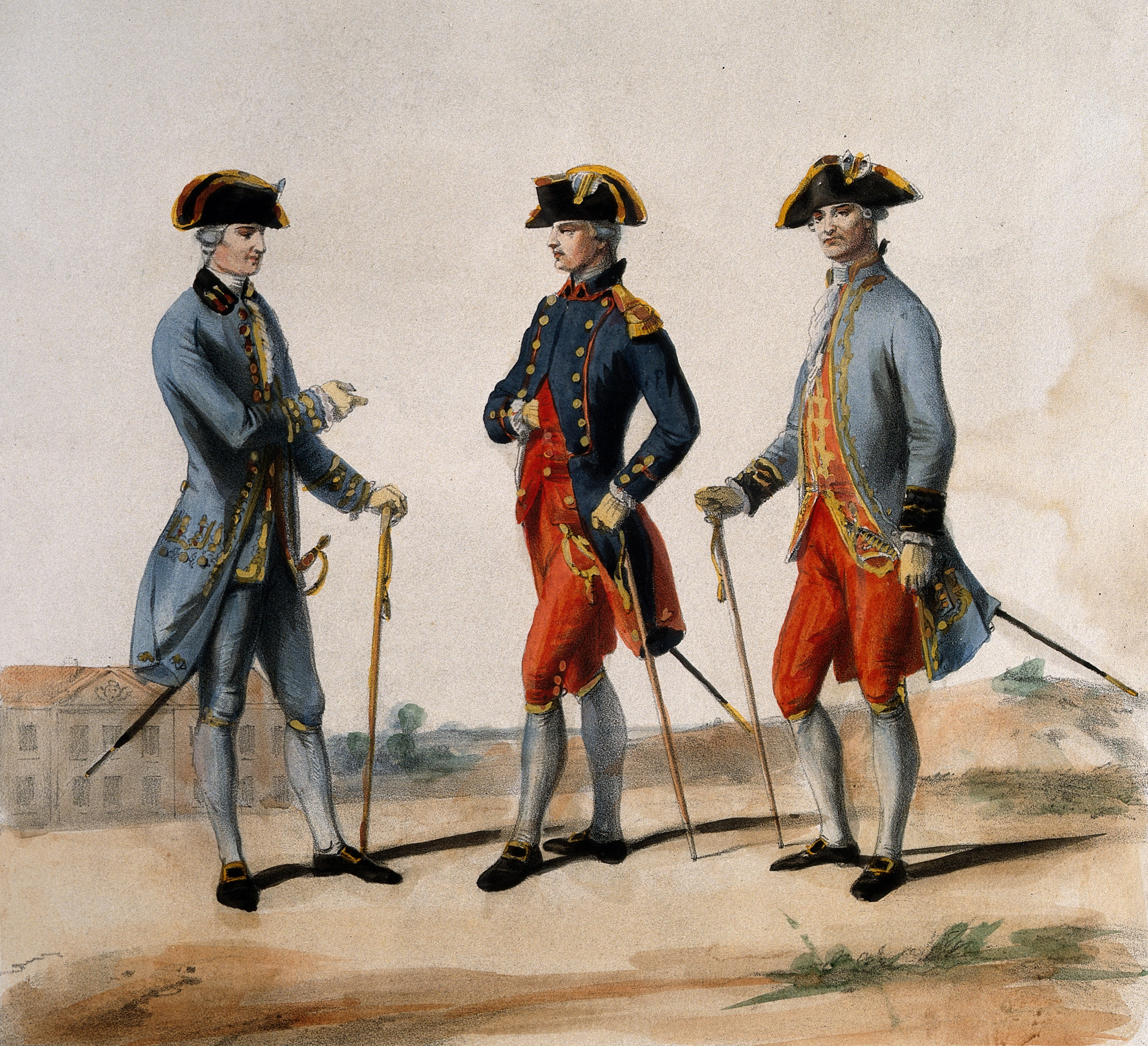
Three French army generals of Louis XVI in military dress, the inspectors of doctors, surgeons and the barracks. Coloured lithograph by G. David after A. de Marbot.

== Gallery ==
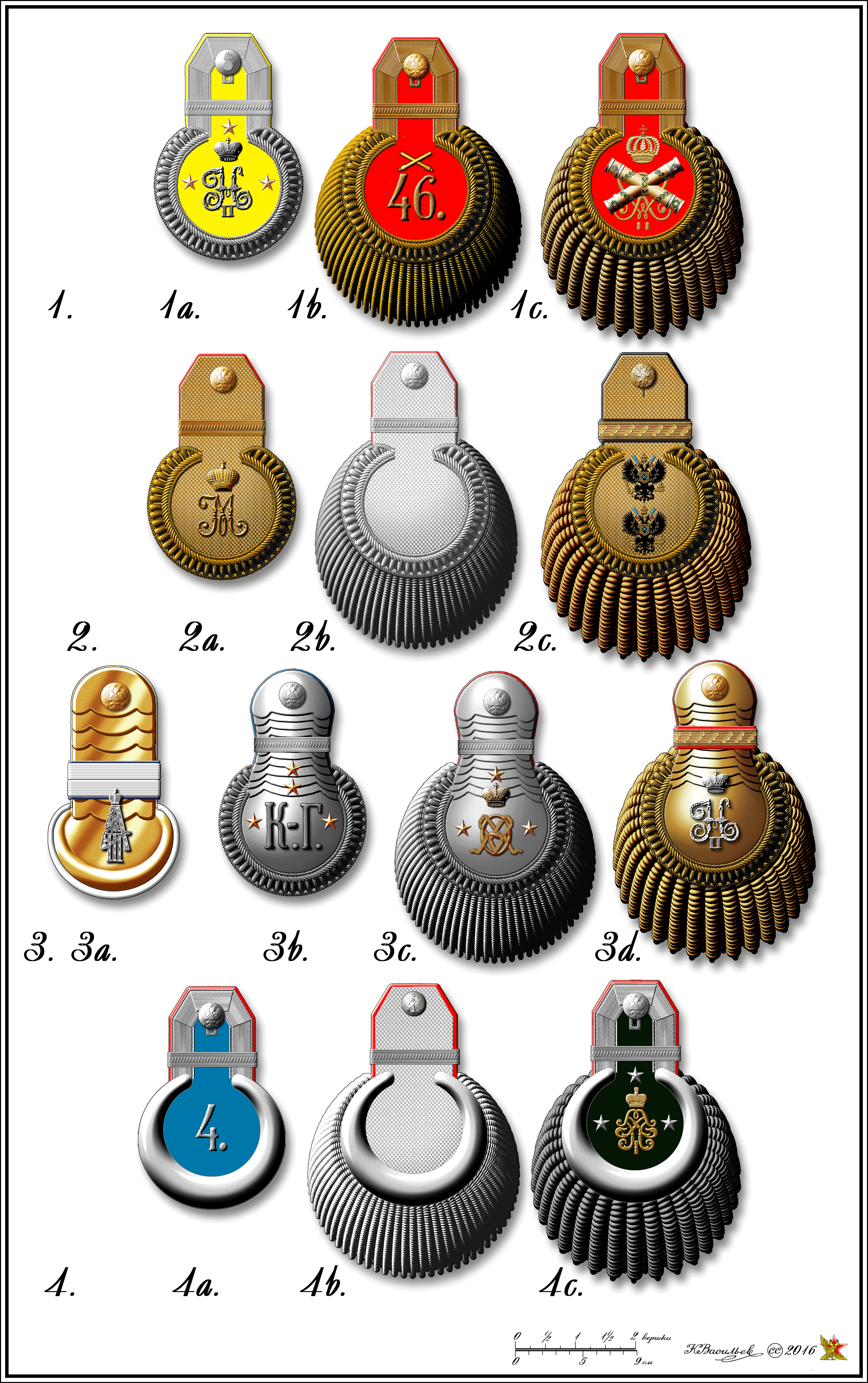
Types of epaulette
Author: Kirill Vasilyev

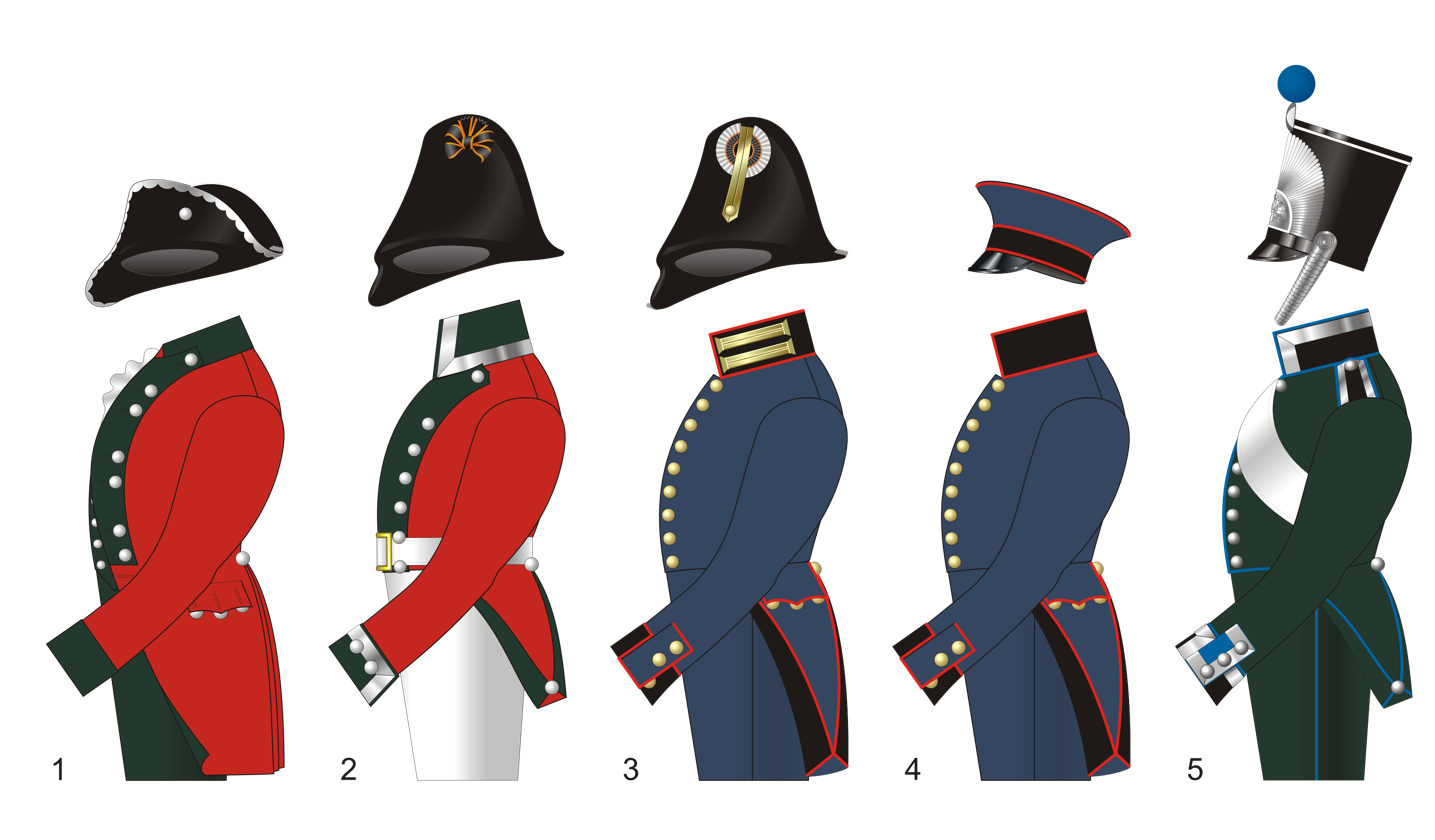
Civil uniform by Mining Institute of the late XVIII - mid-XIX centuries
Author:Sergei Popov (historian)

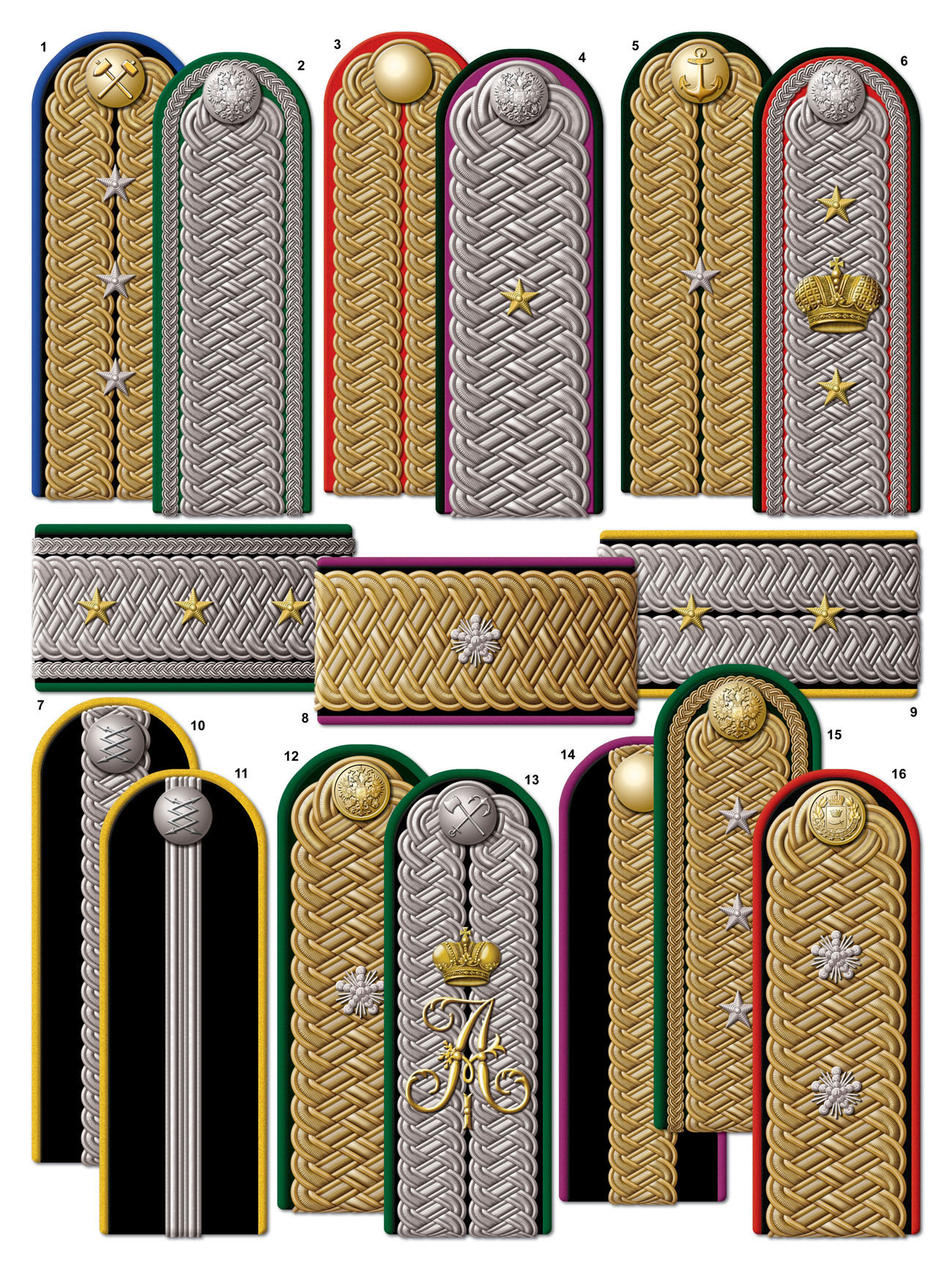
Civil braided shoulder straps, 1876-1885.
Author:Sergei Popov

Private (Uhlan) of the 4th Kharkov Uhlan Regiment until 1882.
Автор:Igor Vorobiov

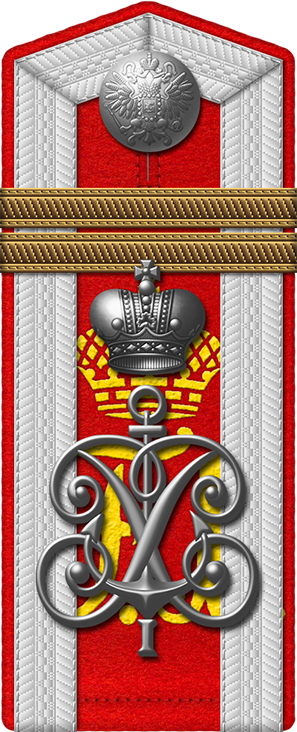
Shoulder straps, 1914.
Author:Alexey Khudiakov

Preobrazhensky Life Guards Regiment, 1914-1917. Field uniform.
Author:Andrei Kuznetsov

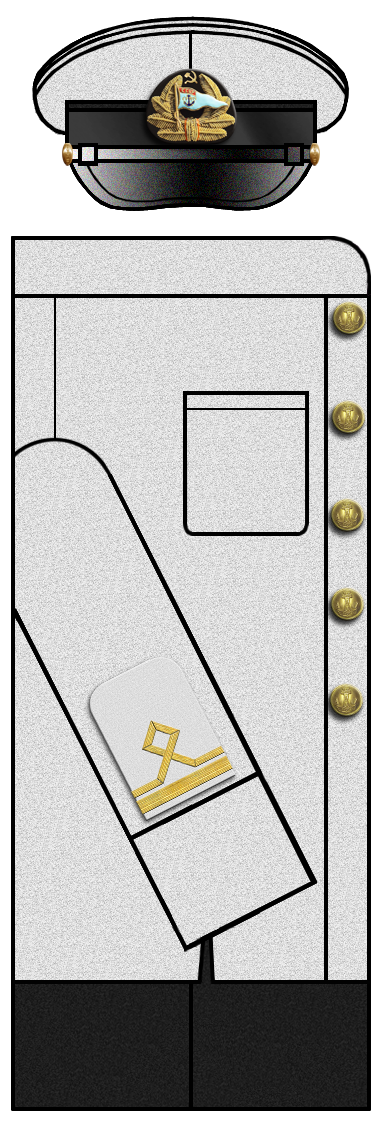
Uniforms for employees of the Chief Directorate of the Northern Sea Route (GUSMP), 1933.
Author:Alexei Karewski

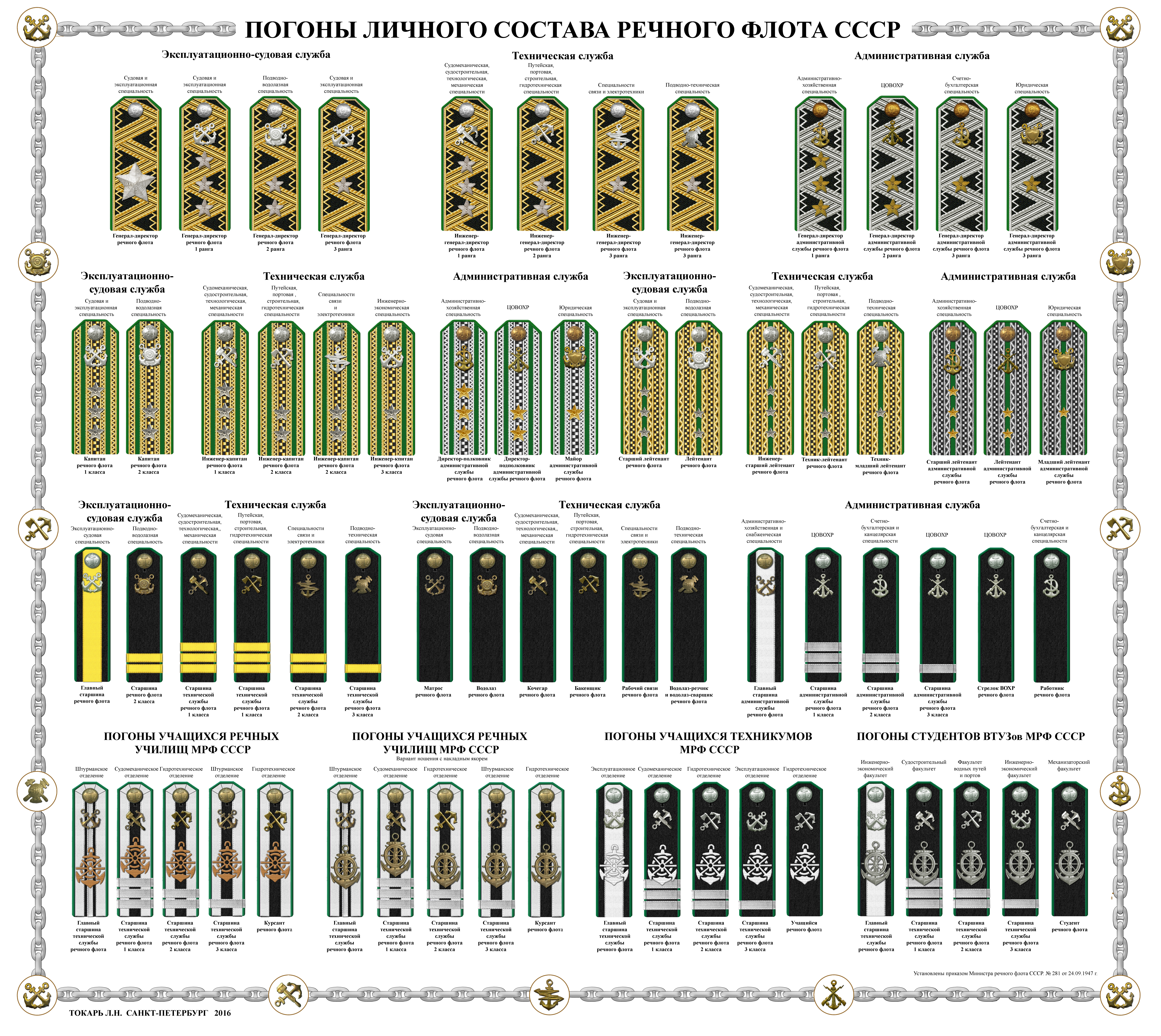
Insignia for personal ranks of river fleet workers.
Author:Leonid Tokar

== See also ==
- Full dress uniform
- Mess dress uniform
- Service dress uniform
- Combat uniform
- Armour
- Costumes
- Militaria
