= Robert Allison (geographer) =

British geographer (born 1961)

Robert John Allison CBE DL (born 4 February 1961) is a British academic. Professor Allison has held senior leadership roles in a number of top UK universities. Currently a Non-Executive Director, Trustee and chair of several organisations, Allison was previously the Vice-Chancellor and President of Loughborough University.

== Education and academic career ==
Allison was brought up in North Yorkshire and educated at Northallerton Grammar School, before studying at Hull University and gaining a B.A. in 1982. He was awarded a Ph.D. from King's College London in 1986 and subsequently appointed as the Addison Wheeler Fellow at Durham University, moving to a lectureship at University College London in 1989. In 1992 Bob Allison returned to Durham, becoming Professor of Geography in 1999. He served as Head of the Department of Geography and Executive Dean of the Faculty of Social Sciences and Health. In 2006 Bob joined the University of Sussex as Pro Vice-Chancellor for Research, eventually becoming Deputy Vice-Chancellor.

Professor Allison was appointed Vice-Chancellor and President of Loughborough University in 2012, serving in that role for nine years. During Professor Allison's tenure at Loughborough, the university rose up into the top 10 in every national league table and named University of the Year an unparalleled five times. He oversaw significant expansion, which included opening the university's London campus on the Queen Elizabeth Olympic Park. Bob also led the development of the UK's most rapidly growing Science and Enterprise Park. Known to students a VC Bob, he was the driving force behind the Loughborough student experience, which is widely recognised as one of the best in the UK. He championed the involvement of students in activities that enable them to make the fullest contribution possible to society. He was - and still is - an enthusiastic supporter of Loughborough Sport.

Professor Allison was the Higher Education representative on the Department of Business, Innovation and Skills Enterprise Education Expert Group, the International HE Adviser to the Minister of Education in Brunei, a member of several speciality groups within Universities UK (the collective group for the country's higher education institutions) and a member of the QAA / Office for Students Advisory Committee on Degree Awarding Powers. He has been a Non-Executive Director of the Leicester and Leicestershire Enterprise Partnership, is an Honorary Canon Professor of Leicester Cathedral, Trustee of the Oval Multi-Academy Learning Trust and Honorary President of Leicestershire Scouts.

== Charitable work and organisational affiliations ==
Professor Allison now has a portfolio of responsibilities. Recent appointments include becoming a Trustee of The Chatham Historic Dockyard Trust, chair of the Board of Trustees of the St Philip's Centre, chair of the Board of Trustees of The Air Ambulance Service and National Children's Air Ambulance, an independent member of Council and Chair of Audit and Risk Committee at City St George's University of London.

In 2023 Bob was appointed the Senior Non-Executive Member of Chapter at Leicester Cathedral and a Non-Executive Director of HSSMI Ltd. In 2024 he was appointed Chair of Trustees at Gresham College in London. He presently acts as UK Higher Education Adviser to KKR LLP private equity. Professor Allison was appointed Deputy Lord Lieutenant for the County of Leicestershire in 2022.

== Recognition ==
During his career Allison has received several honours and awards, including the Cuthbert Peek Award from the Royal Geographical Society, the Charles Lyell Award from the British Association of the Advancement of Science, and the Jan de Ploey Prize from the Katholieke Universiteit Leuven. He was awarded the Outstanding Leadership Award from the Council for Advancement and support in Education. Professor Allison was appointed Commander of the British Empire (CBE) in the 2021 Birthday Honours for services to education and supporting young people's talent, equality and achievement. He was awarded an honorary degree from Loughborough University in 2023.
