= Earth Surface Processes and Landforms =

- Discipline: Geology, geomorphology, hydrology, soil science, Earth sciences
- Language: English
- Edited by: S.N. Lane

Publication details
- Former name(s): Earth Surface Processes
- History: 1976–present
- Publisher: John Wiley & Sons on behalf of the British Society for Geomorphology
- Frequency: 15/year
- Impact factor: 4.133 (2020)

Standard abbreviations
- ISO 4: Earth Surf. Process. Landf.

Indexing
- CODEN: ESPLDB
- ISSN: 0197-9337 (print); 1096-9837 (web)
- LCCN: sn97001335
- OCLC no.: 909876863

Links
- Journal homepage; Online access; Online archive

Earth Surface Processes and Landforms is a peer-reviewed scientific journal published by John Wiley & Sons on behalf of the British Society for Geomorphology. It covers geomorphology and more in general all aspects of Earth sciences dealing with the Earth surface. The journal was established in 1976 as Earth Surface Processes, obtaining its current name in 1981. The journal primarily publishes original research papers. It also publishes Earth Surface Exchanges which include commentaries on issues of particular geomorphological interest, discussions of published papers, shorter journal articles suitable for rapid publication, and commissioned reviews on key aspects of geomorphological science. Foci include the physical geography of rivers, valleys, glaciers, mountains, hills, slopes, coasts, deserts, and estuary environments, along with research into Holocene, Pleistocene, or Quaternary science. The editor-in-chief is Stuart Lane (University of Lausanne).

== Abstracting and indexing ==
The journal is abstracted and indexed in:

- CABI databases
- Chemical Abstracts Service
- Current Contents/Physical, Chemical & Earth Sciences
- EBSCO databases
- Ei Compendex
- FLUIDEX
- GEOBASE
- GeoRef
- Inspec
- ProQuest databases
- Science Citation Index
- Scopus
- VINITI Database RAS

According to the Journal Citation Reports, the journal has a 2020 impact factor of 4.133.

== See also ==
- List of scientific journals in earth and atmospheric sciences
