= Paul A. Shaw =

- Born: 1947 (age 78–79); Bath, Somerset, United Kingdom
- Known for: "The Kalahari environment" (written with David S.G. Thomas)

Paul A. Shaw is a physical geographer and a Fellow of the Royal Geographical Society.

== Biography ==
=== Early life ===
He was born in Bath, Somerset, United Kingdom, in 1947, and was educated at the Duke of York's Royal Military School in Dover.

=== Career ===
He is currently the Professor of Geography (chair awarded in 2009) at the University of the West Indies, St Augustine, Trinidad and Tobago.

He worked in several universities before this, including the University of Luton (awarded chair in Physical Geography in 1995) and the University of Guyana, the University of Botswana (awarded the chair in Geography in 1992) and the University of Malawi outside of the UK.

Shaw is a Fellow of The Royal Geographical Society and is on the editorial board of the Journal of Arid Environments.

=== Research ===
Shaw has authored many scientific papers, as well as two books, one of which — The Kalahari Environment (written with David S.G.Thomas) — is a major text in the field of desert studies, being cited in many papers and texts written on the subject of the Kalahari Desert, or desertification, or both.

His research deals with desertification, dryland and tropical environments, climate change, geomorphology, Quaternary and historical palaeoenvironmental reconstruction.

== Books ==
- The Kalahari Environment David S. G. Thomas and Paul A. Shaw Cambridge University Press, 1991. xiii, 275 p.: ill., maps. ISBN 0-521-37080-9
- Geomorphology of Botswana: an Annotated Bibliography Paul A Shaw and D.J. Nash 1998 Botswana Society Bibliography of Botswana Part III. The Botswana Society, Gaborone. 43 pp.

Book Chapters

- Thomas, D.S.G. & Shaw, P.A. 2012. Terminal Basins : Lacustrine and Pan Systems. In: Holmes, P.J. and Meadows, M.E. (eds) Southern African Geomorphology: Recent Trends and New Directions.Chapter 7: pp. 167–187.
- Shaw, P.A. & Bryant, R.S. 2011. Playas, Pans and Salt Lakes. In: Thomas, D.S.G. (ed) Arid Zone Geomorphology: Process, Form and Change in Drylands. J. Wiley, Chichester. 3rd edition. Chapter 15: pp. 373–401.
- Shaw, P.A. & Thomas D.S.G. 2005. Late Quaternary environmental change in the Kalahari. In: Smith, M & Hesse P. (eds) 23o South:The Archaeology and Environmental History of the southern Deserts. National Museum of Australia Press, Canberra. Chapter 3: 29–44
- Shaw, P.A. 1997. Africa and Europe. In: Thomas, D.S.G. (ed) Arid Zone Geomorphology:Process, Form & Change in Drylands. J. Wiley, Chichester. Chapter 20: 467–486
