= Watermark =

Identification on paper to prevent counterfeiting

Machine-made watermark on a 19th century letter

A watermark is an identifying image or pattern in paper that appears as varying shades of light and dark when viewed by either transmitted light or reflected light. These patterns are created from variations in the thickness or density of the paper. Watermarks have historically been used on postage stamps, currency, and other official documents to discourage counterfeiting. There are two primary methods of producing watermarks in paper: the dandy roll process and the more complex cylinder mould process.

Watermarks vary widely in their visibility. While some are easy to see, other watermarks can be covert. Aids to spot watermarks have been developed, such as watermark fluid that wets the paper without damaging it. A watermark is particularly valuable in the examination of paper goods because it can be used to date documents and artworks. Watermarks can identify sizes, mill trademarks and locations, and the quality of a sheet of paper.

The term watermarking is also used in digital contexts that share similarities with physical watermarks. A digital watermark may be used to identify output from an unlicensed trial version of a program. In another instance, identifying codes can be embedded as a digital watermark for a music, video, picture, or other file. An artist may add their identifying digital signature, graphic, or logo to their digital artworks as an identifier or anti-counterfeiting measure.

== History ==
Watermarks were first introduced in Fabriano, Italy, in 1282. At the time, watermarks were created by varying the thickness of the paper during a stage of the manufacturing process while it was still wet.

== Processes ==
=== Dandy roll process ===
A perspective view of a dandy roll in accordance with the invention of a conventional paper-making machine incorporating watermarks into the paper

Traditionally, a watermark was made by impressing a water-coated metal stamp onto the paper during manufacturing. The invention of the dandy roll in 1826 by John Marshall revolutionized the watermark process and made it easier for producers to watermark their paper.

The dandy roll is a lightweight roller covered with material similar to a window screen that is embossed with a pattern. Faint lines are made by laid wires that run parallel to the axis of the dandy roll, and the bold lines are made by chain wires that run around the circumference of the roll secure the laid wires from the outside. Since the chain wires are located on the outside of the laid wires, they have a greater influence on the impression in the pulp, hence their bolder appearance compared to the laid wire lines.

This embossing is transferred to the pulp fibres, compressing them and reducing their thickness in the corresponding area. Since the patterned portion of the page is thinner, it transmits more light and therefore has a lighter appearance than the surrounding paper. If these lines are distinct and parallel, and/or there is a watermark, then the paper is called laid paper. If the lines appear as a mesh or are indistinct, and/or there is no watermark, then it is called wove paper.

=== Cylinder mould process ===
Another type of watermark is called the cylinder mould watermark. It is a shaded watermark first used in 1848 that incorporates tonal depth and creates a greyscale image. Instead of using a wire covering for the dandy roll, the shaded watermark is created by areas of relief on the roll's own surface. Once dry, the paper may then be rolled again to produce a watermark of even thickness but with varying density. The resulting watermark is generally much clearer and more detailed than those made by the Dandy Roll process, and as such, Cylinder Mould Watermark Paper is the preferred type of watermarked paper for banknotes, passports, motor vehicle titles, and other documents where it is an important anti-counterfeiting measure.

== On postage stamps ==
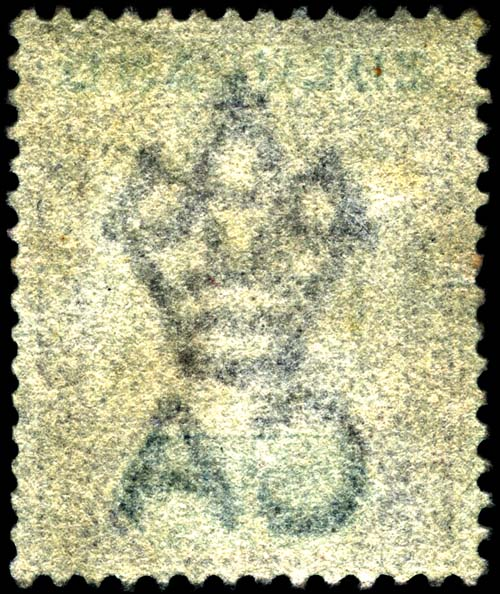
The Crown CA watermark found on many British Commonwealth stamps (seen from the reverse)

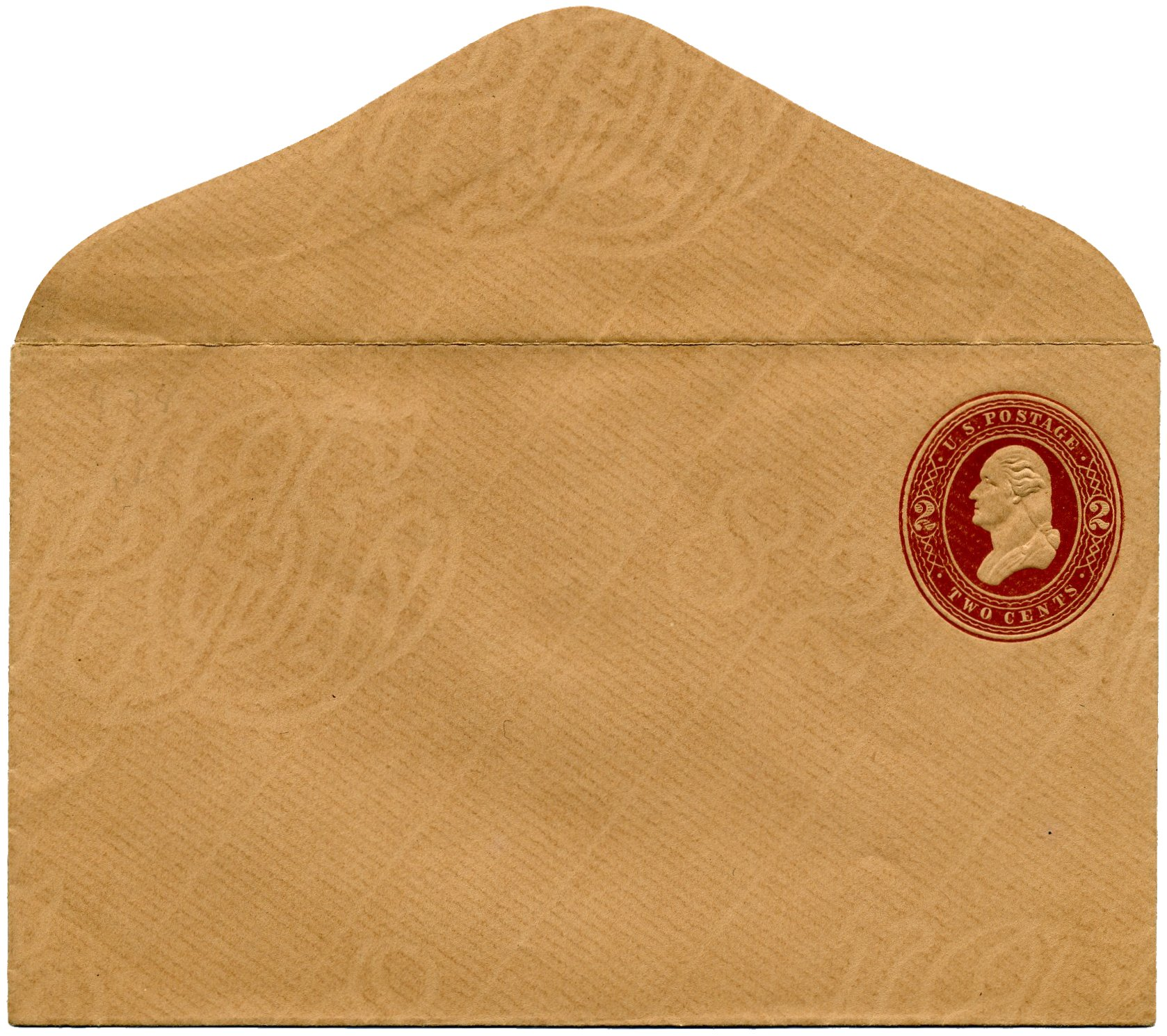
A US postal stationery envelope from 1883 showing a clear watermark on laid paper

In philately, the watermark is a key feature of a stamp, and often constitutes the difference between a common and a rare stamp. Collectors who encounter two otherwise identical stamps with different watermarks consider each stamp to be a separate identifiable issue. The "classic" stamp watermark is a small crown or other national symbol, appearing either once on each stamp or a continuous pattern. Watermarks were nearly universal on stamps in the 19th and early 20th centuries, but generally fell out of use, but some countries continue to use them.

Some types of embossing, such as that used to make the "cross on oval" design on early stamps of Switzerland, resemble a watermark in that the paper is thinner, but can be distinguished by having sharper edges than is usual for a normal watermark. Stamp paper watermarks also show various designs, letters, numbers and pictorial elements.

The process of bringing out the stamp watermark is fairly simple. Sometimes a watermark in stamp paper can be seen just by looking at the unprinted back side of a stamp. More often, the collector must use a few basic items to get a good look at the watermark. For example, watermark fluid may be applied to the back of a stamp to temporarily reveal the watermark.

Even using the simple watermarking method described, it can be difficult to distinguish some watermarks. Watermarks on stamps printed in yellow and orange can be particularly difficult to see. A few mechanical devices are also used by collectors to detect watermarks on stamps such as the Morley-Bright watermark detector and the more expensive Safe Signoscope. Such devices can be very useful for they can be used without the application of watermark fluid and also allow the collector to look at the watermark for a longer period of time to more easily detect the watermark.

== Watermarks and historical scholarship ==
Watermarks can be informative for historians, since they offer clues for when or where a document was prepared. The musicologist Alan Tyson conducted a comprehensive survey of the forms of paper employed by Wolfgang Amadeus Mozart, based primarily on watermarks, and was thus enabled to correct the date (and often place of origin) assigned by earlier scholars to the composer's compositions. Filigranology is the study of watermarks.

== See also ==
- Allan H. Stevenson
- Chip art
- Digital watermarking
- Huaya
- Overprinting
- Overprint
- Seals in the Sinosphere
- Thomas Harry Saunders
