= Encyclopedic knowledge =

Extensive knowledge of a wide group of subjects

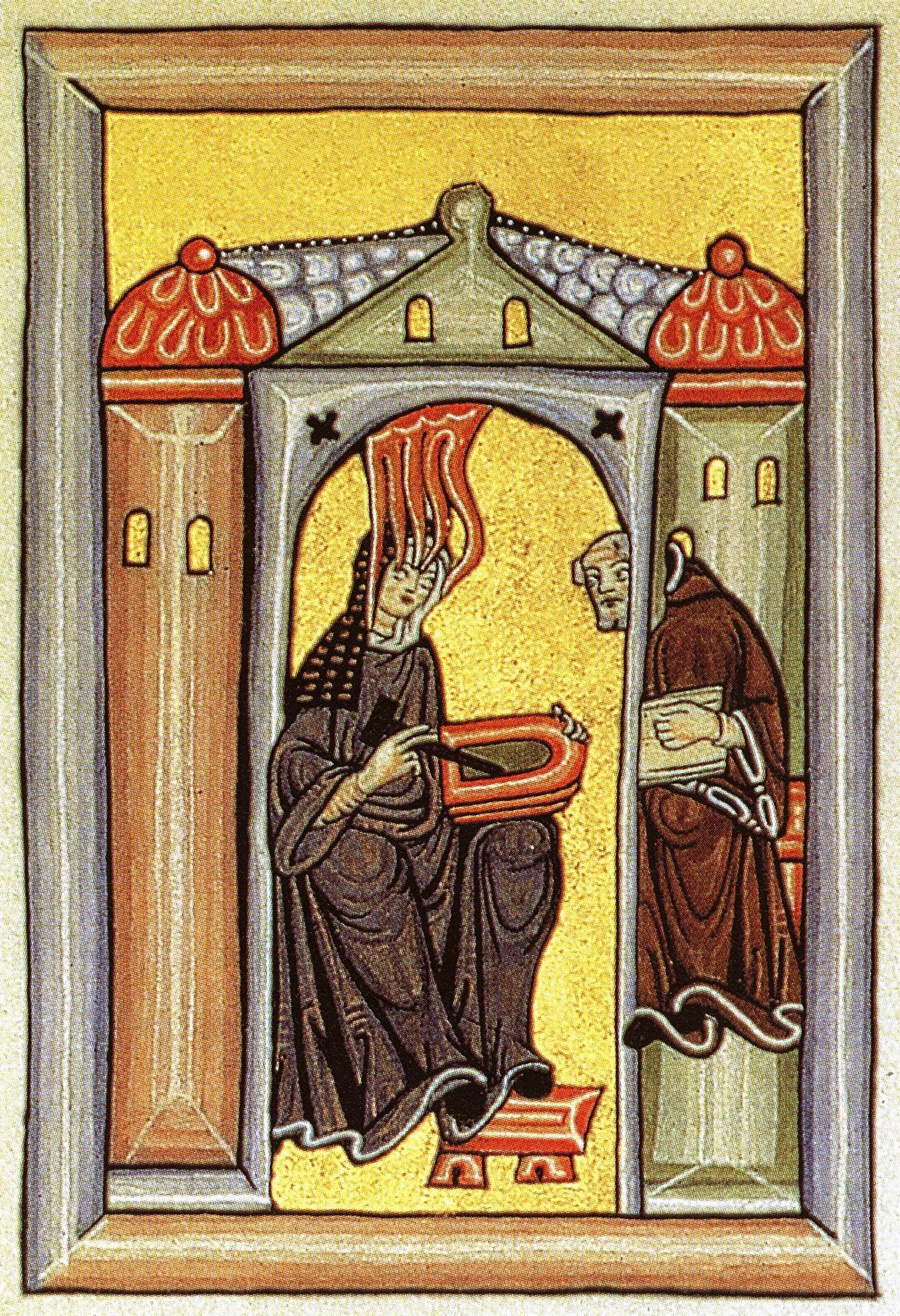
Hildegard von Bingen, who is frequently used as an example of a "walking encyclopedia".

To have encyclopedic knowledge is to have "vast and complete" knowledge about a large number of diverse subjects. A person having such knowledge might, sometimes humorously be referred to as "a human encyclopedia" or "a walking encyclopedia".

The concept of encyclopedic knowledge was once attributed to exceptionally well-read or knowledgeable persons such as Plato, Aristotle, Hildegard von Bingen, Leonardo da Vinci, Immanuel Kant, or G. W. F. Hegel. Tom Rockmore described Hegel, for example, as a polymath and "a modern Aristotle, perhaps the last person to know everything of value that was known during his lifetime." Such persons are generally described as such based on their deep cognitive grasp of multiple and diverse fields of inquiry—an intellectually exceptional subset of philosophers who might also be differentiated from the multi-talented, the genius, or the "Renaissance man."

== References in popular culture ==
The Hitchhiker's Guide to the Galaxy has evolved from a fiction to a crowd-sourced web site (see External links below).

The idea of encyclopedic knowledge has made many appearances in popular culture, being especially widespread in detective fiction. In 1887, Sir Arthur Conan Doyle introduced his fictional master sleuth, Sherlock Holmes, who applied his keen deductive acumen and prodigious range of knowledge to solve his cases. Encyclopedia Brown is a series of books by Donald J. Sobol featuring the adventures of boy detective Leroy Brown, nicknamed "Encyclopedia" for his intelligence and range of knowledge that was first published in 1963.

One of the most celebrated is the fictional Hitchhiker's Guide to the Galaxy by the late Douglas Adams which began its evolution through numerous mediums as a British radio program in 1978. In 2004, NPR contributor A. J. Jacobs published The Know-It-All, about his experience reading the entire Encyclopædia Britannica from start to finish.

== Domain-specific ==
While deep encyclopedic knowledge across numerous fields of inquiry by a single person is no longer feasible, encyclopedic knowledge within a field of inquiry or topic has great historical precedent and is still often ascribed to individuals. For example, it has been said of Raphael Lemkin that "his knowledge of the logic behind the Nazi war machine was encyclopedic."

In 1900, Alexander Graham Bell, who set out to read the entire Encyclopædia Britannica himself, served as the second president of the National Geographic Society and declared the Society should cover "the world and all that is in it." While this goal sounds all-encompassing, it is in fact a statement towards comprehensive geographic knowledge, meaning the scope of the National Geographic Society's enterprise should attempt to be terrestrially unbounded.

In an era of specialization, be it academic, functional, or epistemological, obtaining domain-specific encyclopedic knowledge as an expert is typically celebrated and often rewarded by institutions in modern society. (This appreciation for having extensive niche knowledge, however, should not be confused with the historical experimentation and debate surrounding the division of labor which has been argued to limit the knowledge of workers compelled to perform repetitive tasks for the sake of an overall increase in economic productivity.)

== Views ==
Edward Said, in his seminal postcolonial work, Orientalism, examines the encyclopedic endeavor in great detail, saying it is an historically hegemonic enterprise. Orientalists' "unremitting ambition was to master all of a world, not some easily delimited part of it such as an author or a collection of texts."
