= Transactions of the Institute of British Geographers =

- Discipline: Geography
- Language: English
- Edited by: Adrian Bailey; Robyn Dowling; Jo Little; Simon Naylor

Publication details
- History: 1935-present
- Publisher: Wiley-Blackwell (United Kingdom)
- Frequency: Quarterly
- Impact factor: 3.17 (2015)

Standard abbreviations
- ISO 4: Trans. Inst. Br. Geogr.

Indexing
- ISSN: 0020-2754 (print); 1475-5661 (web)
- LCCN: 76647986
- JSTOR: 00202754
- OCLC no.: 505013133

Links
- Journal homepage; Online access; Online archive

The Transactions of the Institute of British Geographers is a peer-reviewed academic journal published by Wiley-Blackwell on behalf of the Royal Geographical Society.

According to the Journal Citation Reports, the journal has a 2019 impact factor of 4.32, ranking it 8th out of 84 journals in the category "Geography".
