= British Society for Geomorphology =

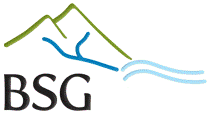
- Abbreviation: BSG
- Formation: 1958
- Type: Learned Society
- Headquarters: Kensington, London, UK
- President: Professor Stephen Rice
- Website: http://www.geomorphology.org.uk

The British Society for Geomorphology (BSG), incorporating the British Geomorphological Research Group (BGRG), is the professional organisation for British geomorphologists and provides a community and services for those involved in teaching or research in geomorphology, both in the UK and overseas. The society’s journal, Earth Surface Processes and Landforms is published by Wiley-Blackwell and online access is available free to members. The society is affiliated with the Royal Geographical Society as an affiliated research group and with the Geological Society of London as a specialist group.

== Mission ==
The mission of the British Society for Geomorphology is to support scientific excellence in geomorphology through:

- fostering excellence and increased investment and support for geomorphology
- developing applied geomorphological research, having a major impact on environmental policy and practice and providing a public benefit
- disseminating new geomorphological research and policy agendas
- developing a new generation of geomorphologists equipped to address interdisciplinary challenges.

== Annual General Meeting and Conference ==
The Annual Conference of the British Society for Geomorphology (BSG) is an international Open Conference. This Annual Meeting stimulates debate on new developments and advances in Geomorphology, and is a forum for emerging approaches to solve key challenges throughout pure and applied Geomorphology.

The Annual Conference for 2025 will be held at the University of Leeds in 15-18 September.

== Earth Surface Processes and Landforms ==
Earth Surface Processes and Landforms is the flagship international journal of the BSG, edited by Stuart Lane (Managing Editor) and five Associate Editors. The Journal publishes original research papers, Earth Surface Exchanges (shorter articles, commentaries, reviews and discussion papers) for rapid publication, technical communications and book reviews across all branches of geomorphology. In July 2017, the revised impact factor for the journal rose to 3.722 (articles published in 2017).

== History ==
The BSG can trace its beginnings back to a meeting in Sheffield in 1958 where British geomorphologists gathered together to organise a Landform Survey of Britain. By 1959 this group appears to have been referring to itself as the British Universities Geomorphological Research Group. This short-lived group agreed, at its second annual meeting, to disband itself and voted unanimously (all 19 of them) to constitute the British Geomorphological Research Group (BGRG). The first BGRG AGM was held on 1 October 1960.

Morphological mapping schemes, emphasising slope, were the subject for discussion at early meetings of the BGRG. Time-consuming to undertake, such schemes produced information about form but not about the processes or the origin of land forms. These schemes evolved in the 1970s to produce geomorphological maps of the UK. Several articles published in the Geographical Magazine in 1975 and 1976 explained the landform maps produced for all parts of Britain. In 1985 the BGRG celebrated its first twenty five years by hosting the first International Geomorphology Conference in Manchester which led to the formation of the International Association of Geomorphology.

In 2000, 40 years of the BGRG were celebrated by returning to Sheffield. Of those 19 geomorphologists who, by their action, can be regarded as the founders of the BGRG, which now has an international membership of around 700, nine attended this 40th Anniversary Meeting. One of them, Tony Orme, presented the Frost Lecture.

In 2006 the BGRG changed its name to British Society for Geomorphology (BSG). The new Constitution stated that the object of the Society shall be the advancement of the science of geomorphology, in research, in all levels of education, and in its practical application.

=== List of chairs ===
Chairs of the group include:

- Chris Hackney (2025-26)
- Annie Ockelford (2024-25)
- Louise Callard (2023-24)
- Rich Jeffries & Katy Kemble (2022-23)
- Andy Russell (2021-22)
- Anne Mather (2020-21)
- Stephen Tooth (2019-20)
- Simon Mudd (2018-19)
- Steve Darby (2017–18)
- John Wainwright (2016–17)
- Joanna Bullard (2014–16)
- Heather Viles (2011–14)
- Bernie Smith (2010–11)
- Andreas Lang (2009–10)
- Lynne Frostick (2008–09)
- Bob Allison (2007–08)
- Paul Bishop (2006–07)
- Angela Gurnell (2005–06)
- Mark Macklin (2004–05)
- Adrian Harvey (2003–04)
- David Thomas (2002–03)
- Charles Harris (2001–02)
- Janet Hooke (2000–01)
- Tony Parsons (1999–2000)
- Alan Werritty (1998–99)
- Rob Ferguson (1997–98)
- Ian Evans (1996–97)
- Tim Burt (1995–96)
- Keith Richards (1994–95)
- Brian Whalley (1993–94)
- Malcolm Anderson (1992–93)
- David Jones (1991–92)
- Des Walling (1990–91)
- John Lewin (1989–90)
- Andrew Goudie (1988–89)
- John Doornkamp (1987–88)
- John Thornes (1986–87)
- Ken Gregory (1985–86)
- Denys Brunsden (1984–85)
- David Sugden (1983–84)
- Edward Derbyshire (1982–83)
- Mike Thomas (1981–82)
- Ian Douglas (1980–81)
- Robert Price (1979–80)
- Ron Cooke (1978–79)
