= Great Britain Historical GIS =

Human geography database of the British Isles

The Great Britain Historical GIS (or GBHGIS) is a spatially enabled database that documents and visualises the changing human geography of the British Isles, although is primarily focussed on the subdivisions of the United Kingdom mainly over the 200 years since the first census in 1801. The project is currently based at the University of Portsmouth, and is the provider of the website A Vision of Britain through Time.

NB: A "GIS" is a geographic information system, which combines map information with statistical data to produce a visual picture of the iterations or popularity of a particular set of statistics, overlaid on a map of the geographic area of interest.

== Original GB Historical GIS (1994–99) ==
The first version of the GB Historical GIS was developed at Queen Mary, University of London between 1994 and 1999, although it was originally conceived simply as a mapping extension to the existing Labour Markets Database (LMDB). The system included digital boundaries for registration districts and poor law unions (c.1840 to 1911), local government districts (1911 to 1974), and parishes (1870s to 1974). These boundaries were held not as polygons but as line segments (arcs), using ArcGIS software. Dates of creation and abolition were held for each line segment (or "arc") and custom software was developed to assemble line segments into polygons, creating conventional boundary maps for particular dates. Meanwhile, the Labour Markets Database evolved into the Great Britain Historical Database (GBHDB), which stored a large collection of historical statistics from the census, vital registration and records of poverty and economic distress. These were held in thousands of columns within hundreds of separate tables, within an Oracle database. This system is described in detail in Gregory and Southall (1998), and in Gregory and Southall (2002).

== New GB Historical GIS (2000–) ==
The second version of the GB Historical GIS was developed at the University of Portsmouth from 2000 onwards. The work was mainly funded by the UK National Lottery, so the results had to be useful to a far wider audience than most historical GIS projects.

=== New architecture ===
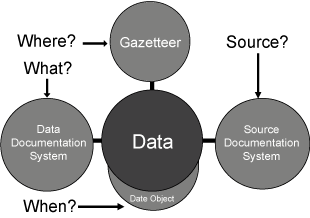
GBH GIS high-level architecture

This is a true spatial database in which all content is held in Oracle, although GIS software is used to edit content. It is designed to overcome the limitations of the original system:

- The statistical content is now the core of the system, all data values being held in a single column of a single table, with other columns indicating what the number measures, when and where it is for, and the source it was taken from (Southall, 2007).
- Where is recorded not directly as a location but via a reference to a large catalogue of administrative units. This catalogue is organised as an ontology, each unit having any number of names and at least one IsPartOf relationship with a higher-level unit; the obvious exception is the root unit, which represents the British Isles and to which all other units ultimately belong.
- Almost all the original digital boundaries are included in the new system, but they are held as polygons rather than line segments. Many units, especially those lacking associated statistical data, do not have boundary polygons. Most of these have approximate centroids, inferred from their relationships with units that do have polygons.
- The meaning of the statistical content—the what in the central data table—is recorded via a data documentation subsystem which is another ontology. It was designed as a relational implementation of the aggregate data extension developed by the Data Documentation Initiative. This sub-system does not simply provide text defining variables, it directly drives the graphical presentation of data. Each data value is located within an nCube or Hypercube. For more details, see Southall (2008).

=== Expanded content ===
This new version of the GB Historical GIS also included several other kinds of content:

- Descriptive Gazetteers: Over 90,000 entries from three late nineteenth century gazetteers: John Marius Wilson's Imperial Gazetteer of England and Wales (1872); Frances Groome's The Ordnance Gazetteer of Scotland (1885); and John Bartholomew's Gazetteer of the British Isles (1887).
- Travel Writing: The text of most of the best known historical British travel writers, including James Boswell, William Camden, William Cobbett, Daniel Defoe, Celia Fiennes, Charles Wesley and Arthur Young. The earliest source included in the GB Historical GIS is a survey of Wales written by Giraldus Cambrensis in 1188. Place-names are identified within these texts using XML tags defined by the Text Encoding Initiative. This is believed to be the largest collection of British historical travel literature on the web, and is unique in that it is fully geo-referenced.
- Census Reports: The sub-system recording sources of statistical information holds a complete list of all the tables published in British census reports up to 1961, enabling the system to reconstruct selected tables. The system also holds the introductory text from selected reports, and the Guide to Census Reports: Great Britain 1801-1966.
- Geographical name authority: the administrative unit ontology described above was created from quite separate sources from the original GIS, including Frederick Youngs' Guide to the Local Administrative Units of England, Melville Richards' Welsh Administrative and Territorial Units and a new gazetteer of Scottish counties, parishes and burghs created by the Scottish Archives Network. It also holds additional variant names found in census reports, and is designed to be used for name authority control.

All of this new content is held in the same Oracle database and linked to the polygons and statistics inherited from the original GBHGIS.

=== Historical maps ===
A GIS consisting entirely of administrative boundaries can create maps but these are hard to relate to the real world. The project has therefore constructed a second GIS consisting entirely of scanned images of historical maps, supporting an on-line map library.

Three complete sets of one inch to one mile maps of Great Britain have been scanned and geo-referenced, each accompanied by less detailed maps from the same period:

- The Ordnance Survey New Popular Edition, from the late 1940s. These are the most recent detailed maps of Britain to be free from OS copyright. The smallest scale twentieth century map is New Map of the British Isles. Produced under the direction of A. Gross, (London: Geographia, 1921; British Library shelfmark Maps 1080.(70.)). The intermediate mapping is the Ordnance Survey of Great Britain. Scale of ten statute miles to one inch. 1:633 600 maps from 1904 (British Library shelfmark Maps 1125.(14.)).
- The Ordnance Survey First Series. These were created over several decades during the mid-19th century, and the GB Historical GIS uses the earliest state for each sheet held by the British Library. The least detailed nineteenth century map is from 1812 and is by Robert Wilkinson, at a scale of 1:1,625,000 (British Library shelfmark Maps 177.d.2.(15.)). The intermediate scale map is Smith's New Map of the United Kingdom of Great Britain and Ireland: on which the Turnpike, and Principal Cross Roads, are carefully described. Particularly distinguishing the Route of the mail Coaches, the course of the Rivers, and Navigable canals; ..., published in 1806 at a scale of 1:633,600 (British Library shelfmark Maps 177.d.2.(14.)).
- The Land Utilisation Survey of Great Britain, created by L.Dudley Stamp of the London School of Economics. These maps include all the published one inch sheets, plus the 56 maps covering upland Scotland, hand painted in water colour to show land use, that Stamp deposited with the Royal Geographical Society (RGS Control No. 568206). The ten mile to the inch summary sheets published by the LUSGB are also included.

This collection of historical maps is not held in the main Oracle system. They are instead managed using open source MapServer software. However, they are mainly accessed via MapServer's implementation of the Open Geospatial Consortium's Web Map Service standard. This is how they are used by the GB Historical GIS project's Vision of Britain system, but they are also available for use as base maps by other web sites.

=== Re-districting statistics to constant units ===
Britain has had an unusually large number of changes to its local government geography, and the current districts date back only to 1996, to 1974 or, in London, to 1965. As census reporting has always been based on local government units, it is hard to study how any particular area has changed in the long term. One of the main reasons for building the GB Historical GIS was to enable demographic and social statistics to be 're-districted from various historical units to modern districts. This is done using a vector overlay methodology, using parish-level counts of total population to weight the reallocation of district-level data.

This methodology has been used to replicate the most important statistics from the Key Statistics release from the 2001 census for many earlier dates, including total population from 1801, occupational structure for selected censuses from 1841 onwards, and age and gender structure for every census from 1851 onwards.

=== A Vision of Britain Through Time ===
Components of the GB Historical GIS are available for download by academic researchers from the UK Data Archive and from EDINA's UKBorders system. However, the main way most people can access the system is via the Vision of Britain web site, developed by the GB Historical GIS project with their lottery funding.

The site is designed mainly as a resource for studying local history but also includes extensive mapping facilities. It includes home pages both for "places", i.e. towns and villages, and for the individual administrative units based on places. Administrative unit pages provide access to census statistics for the unit, to boundary maps and to formal information on official names and status, relationships with other units and boundary changes. All these web pages are generated by software from the data held in the underlying GB Historical GIS. Many Wikipedia pages refer to Vision of Britain.

Vision of Britain is an unusual web site as it is database-driven, but uses the ontologies in the underlying system to create clickable links between pages: most pages the site can create can be reached without filling out a search form, or clicking on an image map, and this makes the site's content generally accessible to search engines. One result is that Google searches for historical information for particular places in Britain are very likely to return links to Vision of Britain. For the most reliable results, search in Google for "place county history"; for example, "Portsmouth Hampshire History".

For a detailed guide to using the Vision of Britain system for research into local history, see Southall (2006).

=== GIS status ===
The post-2000 GB Historical GIS makes no use of commercial GIS software, except for editing parts of the content, and implements a data model which could not be implemented using packages such as ArcGIS or MapInfo, so is it a GIS at all? It is certainly not a conventional GIS, but one answer is that any system that can create an image like the one shown below is some kind of GIS. This image from A Vision of Britain through Time combines the boundaries of local government districts, data on unemployment from the 1931 census, and a scanned image of an Ordnance Survey ten mile-to-one inch map from the early 20th century.

Unemployment in 1931, from Vision of Britain

== Extended Historical GIS (2007 onwards) ==
A new system is being developed, partly with funding from the European Union under the QVIZ project, which will no longer be limited to Great Britain:

- The root unit represents the world rather than the British Isles, although more detailed decisions about map projections mean that the system is in practice limited to Europe.
- All coordinates are held using latitude and longitude, not the Ordnance Survey National Grid.
- All geographical names and some other text are held using Unicode (UTF-8).
- Multiple languages are supported, especially when recording geographical names, using Ethnologue codes to identify modern languages and Linguist codes for historical ones.

An enhanced web site based on this extended system was launched in 2009.
