= Seductive details =

Educational ploy to induce attention

Seductive details are often used in textbooks, lectures, slideshows, and other forms of educational content to make a course more interesting or interactive. Seductive details can take the form of text, animations, photos, illustrations, sounds or music and are by definition: (1) interesting and (2) not directed toward the learning objectives of a lesson. John Dewey, in 1913, first referred to this as "fictitious inducements to attention". While illustrated text can enhance comprehension, illustrations that are not relevant can lead to poor learning outcomes. Since the late 1980s, many studies in the field of educational psychology have shown that the addition of seductive details results in poorer retention of information and transfer of learning. Thalheimer conducted a meta-analysis that found, overall, a negative impact for the inclusion of seductive details such as text, photos or illustrations, and sounds or music in learning content. More recently, a 2020 paper found a similar effect for decorative animations This reduction to learning is called the seductive details effect. There have been criticisms of this theory. Critics argue that seductive details do not always impede understanding and that seductive details can sometimes be motivating for learners.

== The research ==
Example of an image that is relevant to the topic of carbon sequestration.

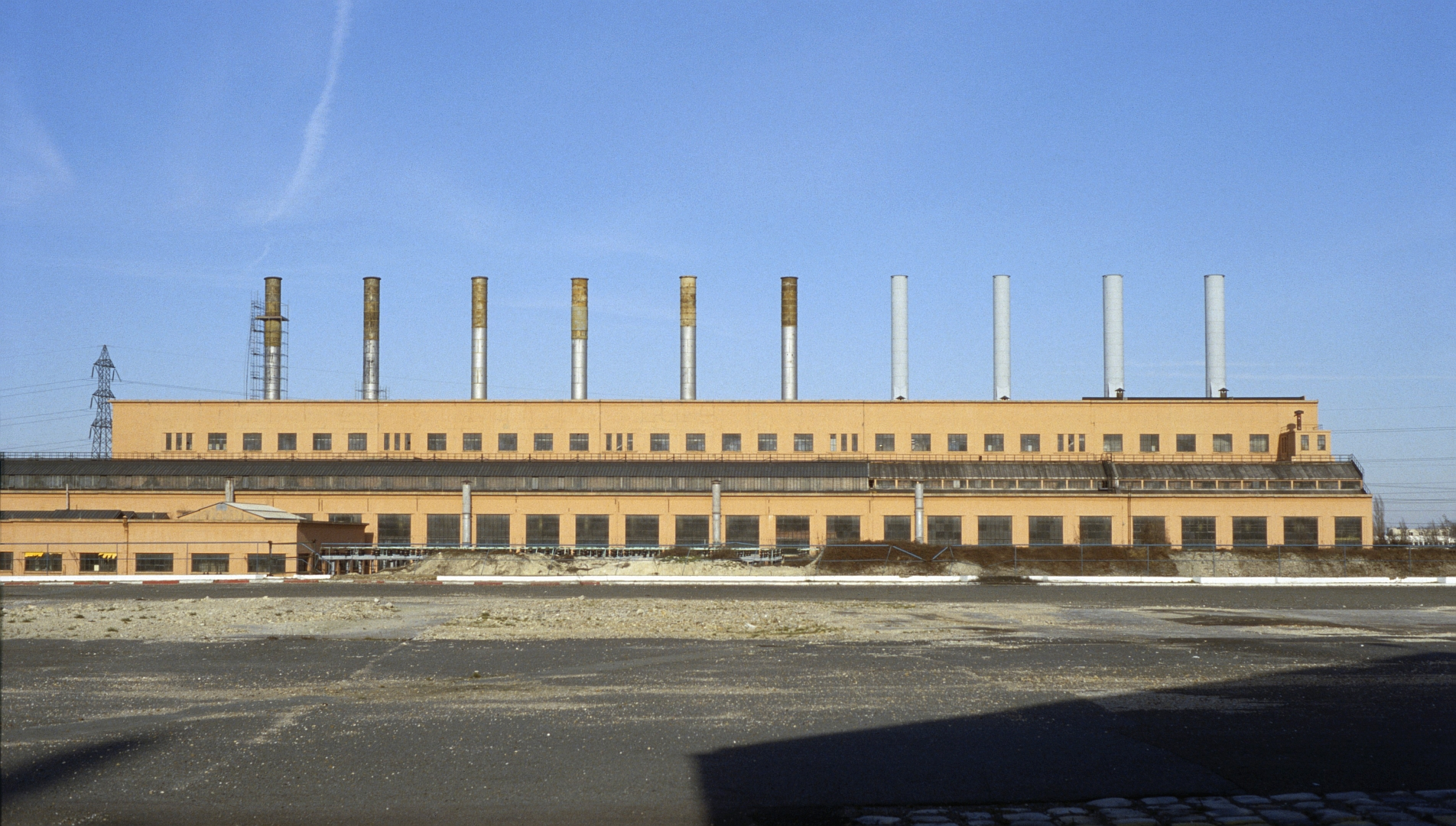
Example of a seductive detail. This image of a fossil fuel power plant is tangentially related to carbon sequestration.

Most studies are conducted through experiments that compare the learning results between two scenarios: an explanation with seductive details and an explanation with no seductive details. The explanation format can vary in form from text-based, video, web-based or presentation style. The seductive details in these experiments includes extraneous details, irrelevant images, irrelevant video and decorative animations. Learning outcomes of participants are determined through a variety of tests that include both recall abilities and problem-solving abilities. This is known as transfer performance.

Early research showed that adding seductive details did not have the intended effect of improving learning; instead the seductive details tended to be detrimental to the learner's recall. Adding interesting but unimportant sentences to expository texts hindered the learning of the main points of the text and learners would remember the seductive details better than the main text.

An example of a seductive detail in a training context might be a training class that includes cartoons on slides containing tips for effective supervision. Although not necessarily relevant to the topic, the cartoons are designed to make the training material more interesting, but the results of multiple studies suggest that their inclusion will harm recall from the primary training content.

Harp and Mayer conducted an experiment using a lesson about lightning strikes. The effect of lightning strikes on airplanes was added as a seductive detail. In six out of six experiments, learners who studied the base lesson without the seductive details about the strikes on airplanes demonstrated they were three times more likely to recall the structurally important details. They also performed much better on a problem-solving task than learners whose lessons included the seductive details. Harp and Mayer suggested seductive details do their damage when learners are consolidating and organizing new information by forming knowledge structures ill-suited for later recall.

== The psychology ==
Researchers focus on various aspects of cognitive theory to explain the seductive details effect. Seductive details impose an extraneous cognitive load during learning by enticing students to spend their limited resources in processing materials that distract from, or disrupt, the construction of a coherent mental model in the learning process. Most studies use seductive details in science text to demonstrate the extraneous cognitive load. However, there are contrasting studies done with non-scientific texts that did not produce the same results. These results may suggest that seductive details can only interfere with learning within a high load learning process that requires managing the available cognitive resources. In learning situations that are associated with low working memory activity, seductive details did not have a detrimental effect. They can even lead to higher performance because there are the required cognitive resources available for the motivating function.

=== Metacognition ===
Jaeger and Wiley, in 2015, looked at readers' ability to monitor their own comprehension. Their study used a science text as the base of a lesson and decorative images as the seductive details. They found that readers were less able to monitor their own comprehension of the text when the text was sprinkled with decorative images.

=== Activating inappropriate prior knowledge ===
A 1998 study by Harp and Mayer determined that it was likely that the seductive details effect created an inappropriate diversion for the learner "by activating an inappropriate base of prior knowledge in the learner". Further, they found that when seductive details were placed at the beginning of a lesson, a learner's performance would be particularly hindered. However, when seductive details were put at the end of a lesson, a student's performance was similar to a student who had not experienced seductive details in their lesson.

=== Cognitive Load and Working Memory ===
Seductive details can act as a source of extraneous cognitive load, occupying some of the limited working space in working memory. A study by Sanchez and Wiley compared people's ability to control their attention to scientific text that contained either seductive images, relevant images, or no images. The study showed that people with low working memory capacity were especially vulnerable to the seductive details effect. Sanchez and Wiley also did an experiment where eye-tracking was monitored to evaluate how people were reading the same seductively illustrated scientific text. The results showed that people with low working memory looked at the seductive illustrations more often and for longer than those with high working memory capacity. It could be argued that differences in performance between high- and low- working memory capacity individuals is really due to general reading ability, an attribute that has been correlated with working memory capacity in other studies.

This vulnerability as it relates to low working memory capacity individuals and seductive details within textual information can also be seen as a difference between children and adult learners. Because adults, on average, having a higher working memory capacity than children, adults are less affected by seductive details than children.

=== Transfer of learning ===
The seductive details effect has primarily been demonstrated at the point of knowledge acquisition (initial learning); its impact on transfer performance has not been clearly shown. Theory in text comprehension suggests that seductive details might be detrimental for recall but advantageous for transfer performance because of the schematic representation of information that trainees form during instruction. Researchers have described the seductive details effect as having a damaging effect on recall because it distracts trainees from learning and they tend to form inappropriate schemas to organize information. However, when learners are applying knowledge, empirical studies suggest that the distortion of the macro structure or schema of the instructional material is beneficial.

In another study, students who read less-organized material performed better that students given organized material on tasks that required an application of the knowledge to problem-solving. This suggests that the inclusion of seductive details might be beneficial for transfer performance but detrimental when trainees are recalling information. Interference from seductive details creates confusion of what the core material is and, therefore, the recall will not be as good and more errors will occur. This distortion can lead to a richer understanding of the material and facilitate transfer performance because trainees are required to form a macro structure of the instructional material. Research using the dual-coding paradigm also suggests that interesting and engaging information promotes image-based thoughts and leads to deeper processing of information because it allows storage of material in both verbal and nonverbal systems. When information is made easier to comprehend, material is processed less deeply, thus leading to poorer acquisition of information.

== Criticisms ==
Classic learning theories and the modern dual-coding theory support the introduction of interesting, tangential details to learning content. There is evidence that interesting and engaging information promotes image-based thoughts and is better remembered because it allows storage of material in both verbal and nonverbal systems. This suggests that interesting material, even if tangential to the topic, does not detract from learning and can promote recall of vague or uninteresting material.

Several recent studies have shown that adding seductive details does not have a significant impact on learner outcomes. Park et al. (2011) looked at cognitive load theory to explain these controversial results. The experiment asked high school students to learn about biology using a multimedia environment (one with seductive details and one without). The experiment also varied the cognitive load for the students. The results showed that students performed significantly higher when seductive details were present in a low cognitive load environment as compared with all other conditions. Another study by Park et al. (2015) showed that while seductive details were detrimental to learning in high cognitive load text conditions, seductive details actually improved motivation and learning outcomes in narration conditions where the cognitive load was low. This means that slideshows or webcasts with well-prepared narration that use motivating bits of information increase learner motivation.

== See also ==
- Assistive technology
- Blended learning
- Distance education
- E-assessment
- Educational animation
- Educational research
- E-learning (theory)
- Instructional design
- Instructional theory
- Intelligent tutoring system
- Learning theory (education)
- Technology integration
