= Graphics =

Visual presentation on some surface

Graphics (from Ancient Greek γραφικός (graphikós) 'pertaining to drawing, painting, writing, etc.') are visual images or designs on some surface, such as a wall, canvas, screen, paper, or stone, to inform, illustrate, or entertain. In contemporary usage, it includes a pictorial representation of data, as in design and manufacture, in typesetting and the graphic arts, and in educational and recreational software. Images that are generated by a computer are called computer graphics.

Examples are photographs, drawings, line art, mathematical graphs, line graphs, charts, diagrams, typography, numbers, symbols, geometric designs, maps, engineering drawings, or other images. Graphics often combine text, illustration, and color. Graphic design may consist of the deliberate selection, creation, or arrangement of typography alone, as in a brochure, flyer, poster, web site, or book without any other element. The objective can be clarity or effective communication, association with other cultural elements, or merely the creation of a distinctive style.

Graphics can be functional or artistic. The latter can be a recorded version, such as a photograph, or an interpretation by a scientist to highlight essential features, or an artist, in which case the distinction with imaginary graphics may become blurred. It can also be used for architecture.

== History ==
The earliest graphics known to anthropologists studying prehistoric periods are cave paintings and markings on boulders, bone, ivory, and antlers, which were created during the Upper Palaeolithic period from 40,000 to 10,000 B.C. or earlier. Many of these were found to record astronomical, seasonal, and chronological details. Some of the earliest graphics and drawings are known to the modern world, from almost 6,000 years ago, are that of engraved stone tablets and ceramic cylinder seals, marking the beginning of the historical periods and the keeping of records for accounting and inventory purposes. Records from Egypt predate these and papyrus was used by the Egyptians as a material on which to plan the building of pyramids; they also used slabs of limestone and wood. From 600 to 250 BC, the Greeks played a major role in geometry. They used graphics to represent their mathematical theories such as the Circle Theorem and the Pythagorean theorem.

In art, "graphics" is often used to distinguish work in a monotone and made up of lines, as opposed to painting.

=== Drawing ===
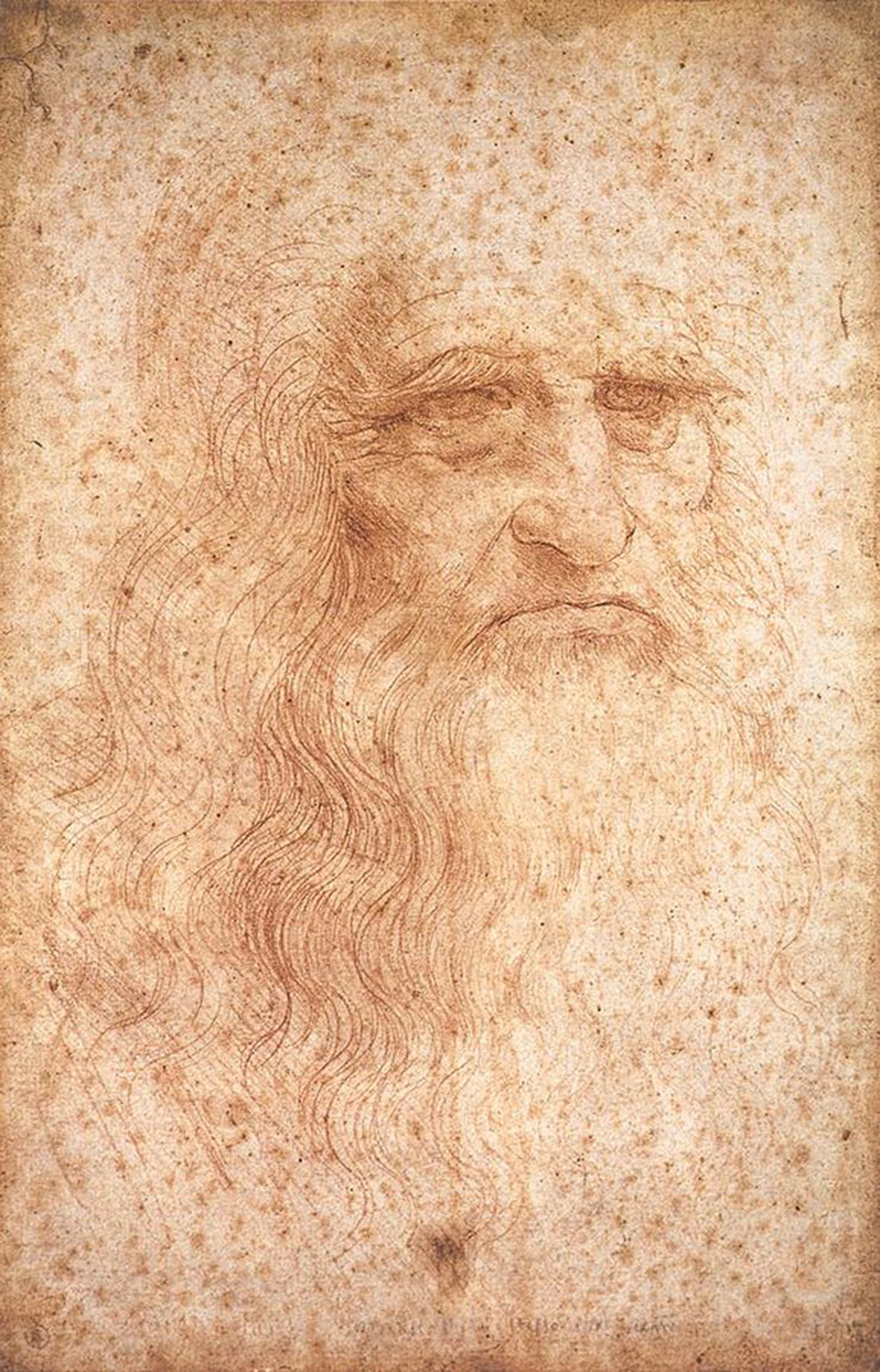
Example of a drawing. This portrait was drawn by Leonardo da Vinci around 1510, and it might depict the artist himself. It is executed in Sanguine (a kind of red chalk) on paper.

Drawing generally involves making marks on a surface by applying pressure from a tool or moving a tool across a surface. In which a tool is always used as if there were no tools it would be art. Graphical drawing is an instrumental guided drawing.

=== Printmaking ===
Woodblock printing, including images is first seen in China after paper was invented (about A.D. 105). In the West, the main techniques have been woodcut, engraving and etching, but there are many others.

==== Etching ====
Etching is an intaglio method of printmaking in which the image is incised into the surface of a metal plate using an acid. The acid eats the metal, leaving behind roughened areas, or, if the surface exposed to the acid is very thin, burning a line into the plate. The use of the process in printmaking is believed to have been invented by Daniel Hopfer (c. 1470–1536) of Augsburg, Germany, who decorated armour in this way.

Etching is also used in the manufacturing of printed circuit boards and semiconductor devices.

=== Line art ===
Line art is a rather non-specific term sometimes used for any image that consists of distinct straight and curved lines placed against a (usually plain) background, without gradations in shade (darkness) or hue (color) to represent two-dimensional or three-dimensional objects. Line art is usually monochromatic, although lines may be of different colors.

=== Illustration ===
An illustration of a character from a story; also, an illustration of illustrations

An illustration is a visual representation such as a drawing, painting, photograph or other work of art that stresses the subject more than form. The aim of an illustration is to elucidate or decorate a story, poem or piece of textual information (such as a newspaper article), traditionally by providing a visual representation of something described in the text. The editorial cartoon, also known as a political cartoon, is an illustration containing a political or social message.

Illustrations can be used to display a wide range of subject matter and serve a variety of functions, such as:

- giving faces to characters in a story
- displaying a number of examples of an item described in an academic textbook (e.g. A Typology)
- visualizing step-wise sets of instructions in a technical manual
- communicating subtle thematic tone in a narrative
- linking brands to the ideas of human expression, individuality, and creativity
- making a reader laugh or smile
- for fun (to make laugh) funny

=== Graphs ===
A graph or chart is a graphic that represents tabular or numeric data. Charts are often used to make it easier to understand large quantities of data and the relationships between different parts of the data.

=== Diagrams ===
A diagram is a simplified and structured visual representation of concepts, ideas, constructions, relations, statistical data, etc., used to visualize and clarify the topic.

=== Symbols ===
A symbol, in its basic sense, is a representation of a concept or quantity; i.e., an idea, object, concept, quality, etc. In more psychological and philosophical terms, all concepts are symbolic in nature, and representations for these concepts are simply token artifacts that are allegorical to (but do not directly codify) a symbolic meaning, or symbolism.

=== Maps ===
A map is a simplified depiction of a space, a navigational aid which highlights relations between objects within that space. Usually, a map is a two-dimensional, geometrically accurate representation of a three-dimensional space.

One of the first 'modern' maps was made by Waldseemüller.

=== Photography ===
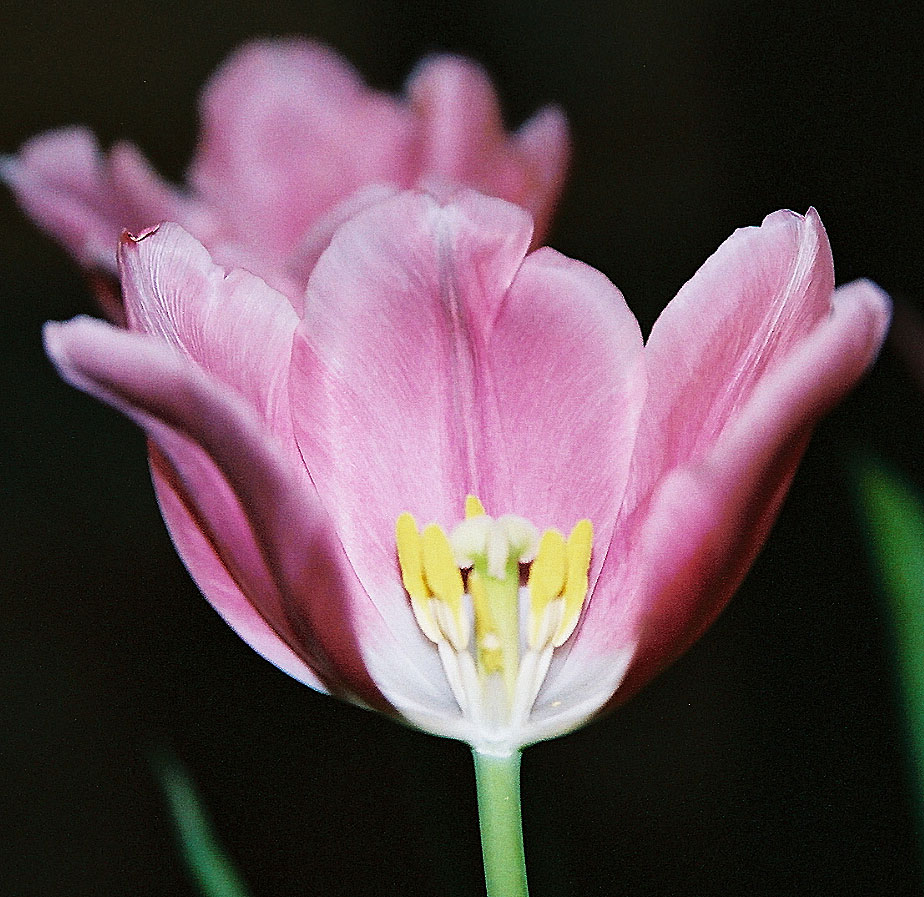
Photo

One difference between photography and other forms of graphics is that a photographer, in principle, just records a single moment in reality, with seemingly no interpretation. However, a photographer can choose the field of view and angle, and may also use other techniques, such as various lenses to choose the view or filters to change the colors. In recent times, digital photography has opened the way to an infinite number of fast, but strong, manipulations. Even in the early days of photography, there was controversy over photographs of enacted scenes that were presented as 'real life' (especially in war photography, where it can be very difficult to record the original events). Shifting the viewer's eyes ever so slightly with simple pinpricks in the negative could have a dramatic effect.

The choice of the field of view can have a strong effect, effectively 'censoring out' other parts of the scene, accomplished by cropping them out or simply not including them in the photograph. This even touches on the philosophical question of what reality is. The human brain processes information based on previous experience, making us see what we want to see or what we were taught to see. Photography does the same, although the photographer interprets the scene for their viewer.

=== Engineering drawings ===
Image of a part represented in First Angle Projection

An engineering drawing is a type of drawing and is technical in nature, used to fully and clearly define requirements for engineered items. It is usually created in accordance with standardized conventions for layout, nomenclature, interpretation, appearance (such as typefaces and line styles), size, etc.

=== Computer graphics ===
There are two types of computer graphics: raster graphics, where each pixel is separately defined (as in a digital photograph), and vector graphics, where mathematical formulas are used to draw lines and shapes, which are then interpreted at the viewer's end to produce the graphic. Using vectors results in infinitely sharp graphics and often smaller files, but, when complex, like vectors take time to render and may have larger file sizes than a raster equivalent.

In 1950, the first computer-driven display was attached to MIT's Whirlwind I computer to generate simple pictures. This was followed by MIT's TX-0 and TX-2, interactive computing which increased interest in computer graphics during the late 1950s. In 1962, Ivan Sutherland invented Sketchpad, an innovative program that influenced alternative forms of interaction with computers.

In the mid-1960s, large computer graphics research projects were begun at MIT, General Motors, Bell Labs, and Lockheed Corporation. Douglas T. Ross of MIT developed an advanced compiler language for graphics programming. S.A.Coons, also at MIT, and J. C. Ferguson at Boeing, began work in sculptured surfaces. GM developed their DAC-1 system, and other companies, such as Douglas, Lockheed, and McDonnell, also made significant developments. In 1968, ray tracing was first described by Arthur Appel of the IBM Research Center, Yorktown Heights, N.Y.

During the late 1970s, home computers became more powerful, capable of drawing both basic and complex shapes and designs. In the 1980s, artists and graphic designers began to see the personal computer as a serious design tool, one that could save time and draw more accurately than other methods.

3D computer graphics began being used in video games in the 1970s with Spasim for the PLATO system in 1974 and FS1 Flight Simulator in 1979. Atari, Inc.'s Battlezone (1980) exposed 3D graphics to a wide audience. Other wireframe and flat-shaded 3D games appeared throughout the 1980s. Ultima Underworld: The Stygian Abyss (1992) was one of the first major video games with texture-mapped polygons.

Computer systems dating from the 1980s and onwards often use a graphical user interface (GUI) to present data and information with symbols, icons, and pictures, rather than text. 3D computer graphics and creation tools became more accessible to video game and film developers in the late 1980s with SGI computers, which were later used to create some of the first fully computer-generated short films at Pixar.

3D graphics became more popular in the 1990s in video games, multimedia, and animation. In 1995, Toy Story, the first full-length computer-generated animation film, was released in cinemas. Since then, computer graphics have become more accurate and detailed, due to more advanced computers and better 3D modeling software applications, such as Maya, 3D Studio Max, and Cinema 4D. Consumer-level 3D graphics acceleration hardware became common in IBM PC compatibles near the end of the decade.

Another use of computer graphics is screensavers, originally intended to prevent the layout of much-used GUIs from 'burning into' the computer screen. They have since evolved into true pieces of art, their practical purpose obsolete; modern screens are not susceptible to such artifacts.

=== Web graphics ===
In the 1990s, Internet speeds increased, and web browsers capable of viewing images were released, the first being Mosaic. Websites began to use the GIF format to display small graphics, such as banners, advertisements, and navigation buttons, on web pages. Modern web browsers can now display JPEG, PNG and increasingly, SVG images in addition to GIFs on web pages. SVG, and to some extent VML, support in some modern web browsers have made it possible to display vector graphics that are clear at any size. Plugins expand the web browser functions to display animated, interactive and 3-D graphics contained within file formats such as SWF and X3D.

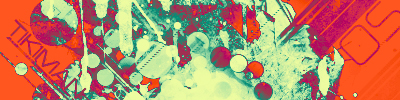
Signature art used on web forums

Modern web graphics can be made with software such as Adobe Photoshop, the GIMP, or Corel Paint Shop Pro. Users of Microsoft Windows have MS Paint, which many find to be lacking in features. This is because MS Paint is a drawing package and not a graphics package.

Numerous platforms and websites have been created to cater to web graphics artists and to host their communities. A growing number of people use create internet forum signatures—generally, appearing after a user's post—and other digital artwork, such as photo manipulations and large graphics. With computer games' developers creating their own communities around their products, many more websites are being developed to offer graphics for the fans and to enable them to show their appreciation of such games in their own gaming profiles.

== Uses ==
Graphics are visual elements often used to point readers and viewers to particular information. They are also used to supplement text in an effort to aid readers in their understanding of a particular concept or make the concept more clear or interesting. Popular magazines, such as Time, Wired and Newsweek, usually contain graphic material in abundance to attract readers, unlike the majority of scholarly journals. In computing, they are used to create a graphical interface for the user; and graphics are one of the five key elements of multimedia technology. Graphics are among the primary ways of advertising the sale of goods or services.

=== Business ===
Graphics are commonly used in business and economics to create financial charts and tables. The term business graphics came into use in the late 1970s, when personal computers became capable of drawing graphs and charts instead of using a tabular format. Business graphics can be used to highlight changes over time.

=== Advertising ===
Advertising is one of the most profitable uses of graphics; artists often do advertising work or take advertising potential into account when creating art, to increase the chances of selling the artwork.

=== Political ===
The use of graphics for overtly political purposes—cartoons, graffiti, poster art, flag design, etc.—is a centuries-old practice which thrives today in every part of the world. The Northern Irish murals are one such example. A more recent example is Shepard Fairey's 2008 U.S. presidential election Barack Obama "Hope" poster. It was first published on the web, but soon found its way onto streets throughout the United States.

=== Education ===
Graphics are heavily used in textbooks, especially those concerning subjects such as geography, science, and mathematics, in order to illustrate theories and concepts, such as the human anatomy. Diagrams are also used to label photographs and pictures.

Educational animation is an important emerging field of graphics. Animated graphics have obvious advantages over static graphics when explaining subject matter that changes over time.

The Oxford Illustrated Dictionary uses graphics and technical illustrations to make reading material more interesting and easier to understand. In an encyclopedia, graphics are used to illustrate concepts and show examples of the particular topic being discussed.

In order for a graphic to function effectively as an educational aid, the learner must be able to interpret it successfully. This interpretative capacity is one aspect of graphicacy.

=== Film and animation ===
Computer graphics are often used in the majority of new feature films, especially those with a large budget. Films that heavily use computer graphics include The Lord of the Rings film trilogy, the Harry Potter films, Spider-Man and War of the Worlds.

== Graphics education ==
The majority of schools, colleges, and universities around the world educate students on the subject of graphic design and art.

The subject is taught in a broad variety of ways, each course teaching its own distinctive balance of craft skills and intellectual response to the client's needs.

Some graphics courses prioritize traditional craft skills—drawing, printmaking, and typography—over modern craft skills. Other courses may place an emphasis on teaching digital craft skills. Still, other courses may downplay the crafts entirely, concentrating on training students to generate novel intellectual responses that engage with the brief. Despite these apparent differences in training and curriculum, the staff and students on any of these courses will generally consider themselves to be graphic designers.

The typical pedagogy of a graphic design (or graphic communication, visual communication, graphic arts or any number of synonymous course titles) will be broadly based on the teaching models developed in the Bauhaus school in Germany or Vkhutemas in Russia. The teaching model will tend to expose students to a variety of craft skills (currently everything from drawing to motion capture), combined with an effort to engage the student with the world of visual culture.

== Noted graphic designers ==
Aldus Manutius designed the first italic type style which is often used in desktop publishing and graphic design. April Greiman is known for her influential poster design. Paul Rand is well known as a design pioneer for designing many popular corporate logos, including the logo for IBM, NeXT and UPS. William Caslon, during the mid-18th century, designed many typefaces, including ITC Founder's Caslon, ITC Founder's Caslon Ornaments, Caslon Graphique, ITC Caslon No. 224, Caslon Old Face and Big Caslon.

== See also ==
- Editorial cartoon
- Visualization (graphics)
- Semiotics
