= Cave Austin and Company =

English chain of grocery stores and cafés

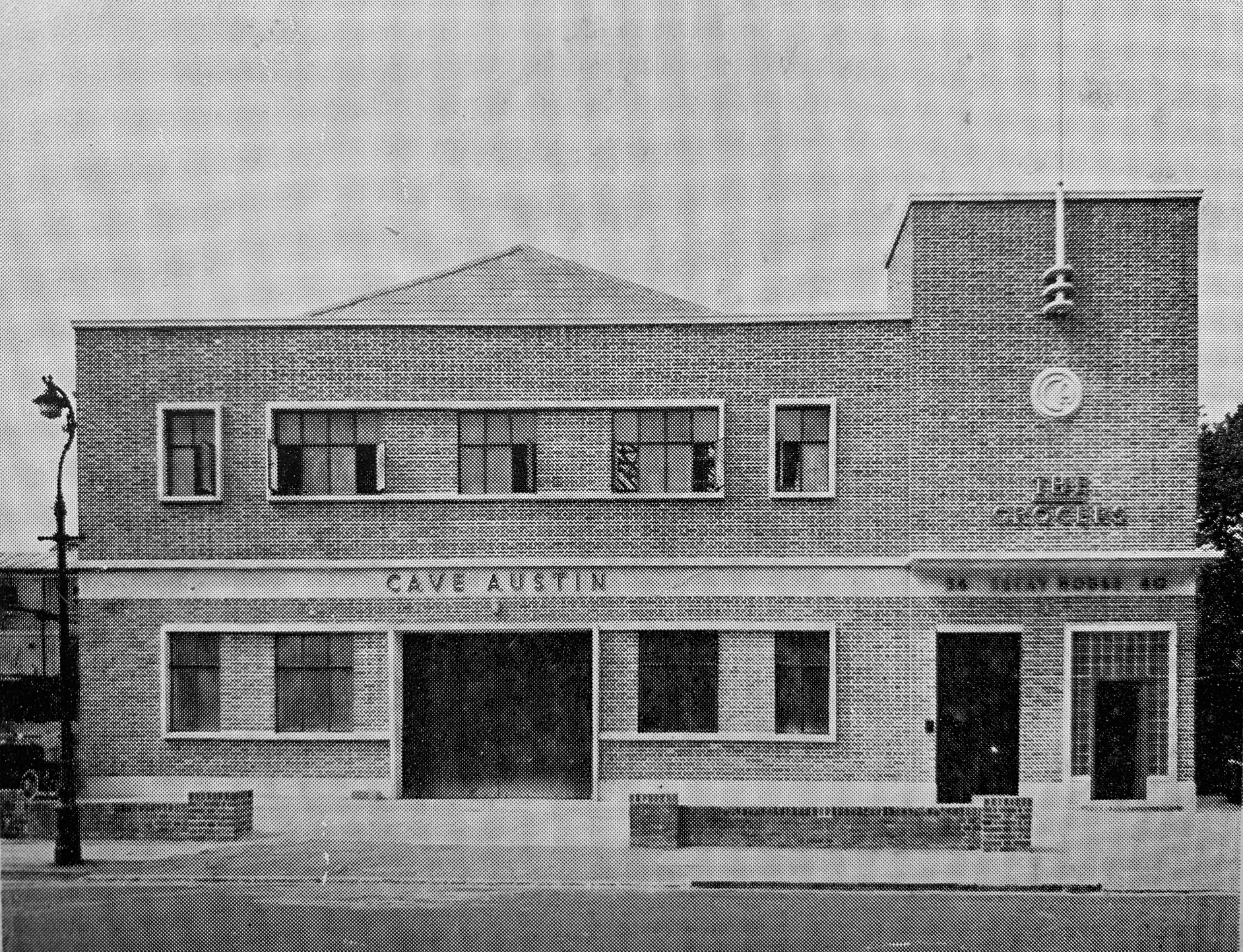
Head Office and Central Warehouse, 34/40 Eastdown Park, Lewisham (c.1955)

Cave Austin and Co., Ltd was a chain of grocery stores and cafés in the southeast of England. During its seventy-year history it grew to some fifty branches in Kent, Surrey, Sussex, and much of South East London. Cafés were in several seaside towns such as Deal in Kent and Hastings in Sussex.

== History ==
Cave Austin and Co., Ltd was officially incorporated as a public company in 1896, when several separate concerns (including tea importers, wine and spirit merchants, and grocery shops) agreed to unite for mutual benefit under combined management. The inaugural board of directors were C.H. Cave, A.J. Cave, Alfred Austin, Charles Stamp (who had his own provision business), E Underwood, James McCabe, and E.J. Mansfield. There were two sides to the business: Grocery Stores and Cafés. The wholesale tea business (represented by the former Lindoo Valley Tea Company) was abandoned in 1903, and an intensive campaign was started to popularize roasted coffee with all coffee roasted, blended, and ground on the company premises by their own staff. By the 1930s, the focus was on developing the company as a 'high-class' grocery chain

=== Cave's Cafés ===
Early in its history the company established a chain of cafés known as Cave's Oriental Cafés with a distinctive oriental decor. They had premises in Brighton (1896) Eastbourne (1899), Folkestone (1900), Dover (1903), Ramsgate (1904), Hastings (1905), Canterbury (1905), Cliftonville (1907), Hythe (1909), Broadstairs (1911), and Deal (1912). The chain was controlled and developed by Mr C.H. Cave. After World War I Cave's Cafés were further developed and modernised by his nephew, Frank Cave.

=== Grocery stores and war damage ===
From 1932, after Mr C. H. Cave's retirement, the Grocery branches were developed in London, Kent, and Surrey under the Chairmanship of Charles Stamp (founder Secretary and Director). Soon after the death of Charles Stamp in 1935, Frank Cave was elected chairman.

During World War II the company suffered greatly with bomb damage: the warehouse in Lewisham, South London was bombed twice, and in 1943 the Eastbourne café was destroyed. The following year Hastings and St.Leonards branches were totally destroyed, and the Blackheath Grocery Store was badly damaged in 1945 by a V2 rocket.

Despite the damage expansion continued, with new premises in Dorking, Beckenham, Mottingham, Worcester Park, Shirley, Rotherfield, Petts Wood and Crofton.

In 1950 Frank Cave died and was replaced as chairman by Charles Alfred Stamp (son of Charles Stamp). Expansion continued including premises at St John's Wood, Downham, and Hayes, Bromley in 1952 - the company's first self-service store . In 1956 a Mobile Grocery Shop equipped with cold cabinet was put on the road. In 1954 a new Warehouse was built in Lewisham which included offices, coffee roasting department, cold store, ham cooking department, wine and spirit stores and sale room. At the same time the company was developing its own label lines.

=== "Sixty years of trading" ===
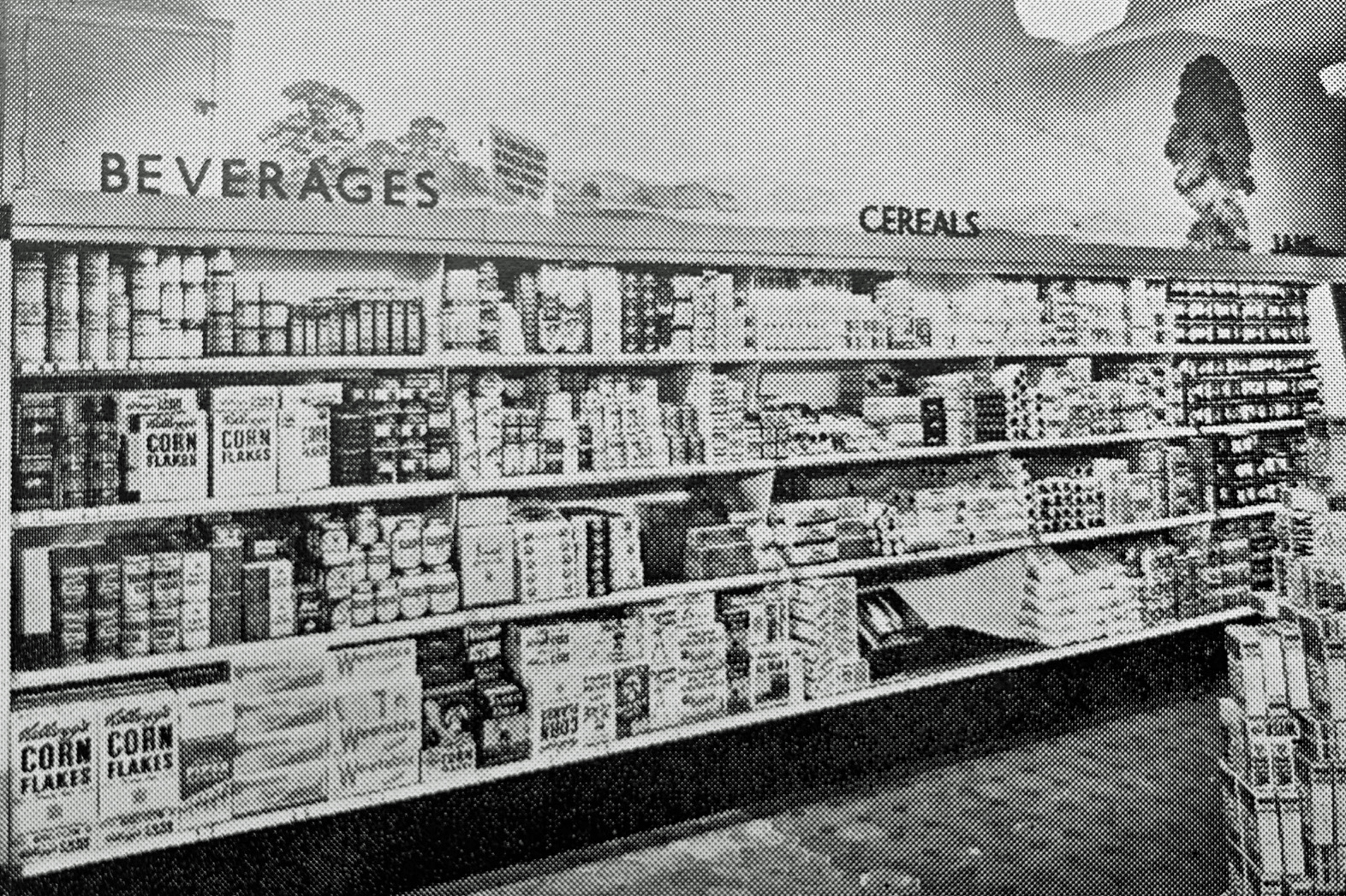
Interior of self-service store, Hayes, Kent (c.1955)

In 1956 the company published a booklet, 'Sixty Years of Trading. A History of Cave Austin and Co., Ltd, Cave's Cafés. 1896-1956". In it was recorded the following statistics: over 400 staff, 24 vans (travelling over 190,000 miles a year), over 30 tons of coffee roasted per annum, 5000 gammons cooked per annum, 92 tons of butter, 100 tons of margarine, 54 tons of tea sold and 2,600 tons of food delivered from warehouse to branches. There were 19 licensed branches with a large range of French wines, and a range of "fancy" groceries such as "okra, puppodums, lychees, Bombay duck, bamboo shoots" (food Rationing in the United Kingdom had only just ended in 1954). At this time the Board of Directors were Charles Stamp, Dudley Stamp, Barry Hartnell Stamp, Stanley Rogers and Leonard Elwood. The booklet ends: "The directors are confident that sixty years of progress will be followed by yet another period of similar development."

=== Competition and takeover ===
Charles Alfred Stamp was subsequently succeeded as chairman in 1963 by his son, Barry Stamp. By this time, it was clear that the unmatched range, value, and buying power of the big Supermarkets, notably Tesco and Sainsbury's, was squeezing the smaller operators. Even though Cave Austin by this time had 40 Grocery stores, they were unable to effectively compete in an aggressively competitive and expanding market. Barry Stamp was the company's last chairman and negotiated its takeover in 1963 by Burton, Son and Sanders of Ipswich. In 1966 the company was sold once more to merge with Moores Stores and the name 'Cave Austin' disappeared.

In the 21st century a wine bar called 'Cave Austin' opened in Blackheath, taking its name from a floor mosaic still at the entrance to the premises. Both the wine bar and mosaic have now gone. Cave Austin 'The Grocers' Head Office and Central Warehouse in Eastdown Park, Lewisham, was demolished in 2025. The CA roundel on the facade was rescued by Barry Stamp's younger son, the artist Gerard Stamp, and now lies in a Norfolk garden.
