= W. G. V. Balchin =

British geographer (1916–2007)

William George Victor Balchin (20 June 1916 – 30 July 2007) was a British geographer. He was noted for original research in geology and significant contributions to geography, and for establishing the academic concept of graphicacy.

== Education ==
William Balchin was born in Aldershot, Hampshire, UK, and attended school there. At the age of 17 he won a scholarship to St Catharine's College, Cambridge, graduating in Geography shortly before he became 20 years old in 1936. During his studies Balchin sought to test a theory of the French geographer Henri Baulig on the geological rise of sea levels, by identifying and mapping levels in Cornwall. His resulting essay won a prize awarded by the Royal Geographical Society and was published in The Geographical Journal.

== Career ==
=== Geology ===
After graduation Balchin gained an appointment as a research demonstrator at Cambridge, and in 1938 joined an Arctic expedition. In the Billefjorden, Spitsbergen, he was able to test the theory of isostasy, that the weight of ice during the Ice Age would have depressed the land beneath it and squeezed out some of the plastic layer below, the sima, which should have gradually oozed back, raising the land surface again, as the ice melted. Balchin and colleagues set out to map a 50-mile length of coast, camping out when it became too far to return to base each day. The mapping showed that isostatic uplift had raised the most southerly tip of the fjord coast by nearly 300 feet. Some of the place names given by the research team to specific features were later incorporated by the Norwegian government into official maps, including ‘Mount Balchin’, now ‘Balchinfjellet’, a 5000 ft glaciated peak at 78° north latitude.

=== Cartography ===
In World War II, Balchin worked on marine charts in the Hydrographic Department of the British Admiralty in Bath, Somerset. As well as making marine charts, including those for the D-Day invasion of Normandy, France, in 1945, he also helped devise special air maps with scales suited to aircraft speeds and colours that maximized legibility in cockpit lighting.

=== Geography ===
Towards the end of the war, with Norman Pye, a colleague from the Hydrographic Department and the Spitsbergen expedition, Balchin initiated a micro-climatological survey of Bath and its district, launching a new research field of local climatology.

In 1945 Balchin became a lecturer at King's College London. University mapwork lacked the professionalism that Balchin had found in the Hydrographic Department and so he developed a new first-year course in cartography.

In 1954 Balchin was appointed as Professor to head a new Geography Department at University College Swansea, Wales (now Swansea University). There he developed Geography from being a subsection of the Geology department to becoming one of the largest departments, introduced new teaching practices, and helped to raise the profile of geography as an academic discipline in British universities.

=== Graphicacy ===
In 1965, arising from his work in cartography, William Balchin and Alice Coleman, an ex-colleague from King's College, coined the term Graphicacy as a characterisation of cartographic and other visuo-spatial abilities, extending across the whole field of graphical communications: ‘the intellectual skill necessary for the communication of relationships which cannot be successfully communicated by words or mathematical notation alone’.

They created the word ‘graphicacy’ by analogy with other essential cognitive abilities of literacy, numeracy and articulacy. Balchin and Coleman regarded graphicacy as not only relevant within geography but also a fundamental ability to be developed throughout all education. In his inaugural presidential address to the Geographical Association in 1972, Balchin claimed spatial ability as the first type of human intelligence to have evolved – "the beginning of highly civilised skills such as map reading and spatial planning".

Balchin continued to argue for and to develop graphicacy as fundamental within geography.

Graphicacy has subsequently been broadly recognised as the educated ability within human intelligence in visuo-spatial cognition and communication, and as an intellectual discipline, developed for example in art and design education, and employed across many other areas, including mathematics and engineering.

== Personal life ==
William Balchin retired from University College Swansea in 1978. He and his wife Lily (née Kettlewood, born 1912, died 1999), who were married in December 1939, settled in her original home county of Yorkshire, in the town of Ilkley. They had three children.
