= Educational animation =

Animations produced for the specific purpose of fostering learning

Educational animations are animations produced for the specific purpose of fostering learning. It is associated with educational technology with the way it supports teaching and learning through the use of technological tools to facilitate learning and to improve performance. They can be used to provide instructions for the immediate performance of a task, or to support more permanent learning of a broader subject matter.

== Background ==
YukiClip2A

The popularity of using animations to help learners understand and remember information has greatly increased since the advent of powerful graphics-oriented computers. This technology allows animations to be produced much more easily and cheaply than in former years. Previously, traditional animation required specialised labour-intensive techniques that were both time-consuming and expensive. In contrast, software is now available that makes it possible for individual educators to author their own animations without the need for specialist expertise. Teachers are no longer limited to relying on static graphics but can readily convert them into educational animations.

== Animations for education ==
Educators are taking up the opportunities that computer animation offers for depicting dynamic content. For example, PowerPoint now has an easy-to-use animation facility that can produce very effective educational animations. Because animations can explicitly depict changes over time (temporal changes), they can help with the teaching of processes and procedures. When used to present dynamic content, animations can mirror both changes in position (translation), and changes in form (transformation)

In contrast with static pictures, animations can show temporal change directly (rather than having to indicate it indirectly using auxiliary markings such as arrows and motion lines). Using animations instead of static graphics removes the need for these added markings so that displays can be not only simpler and less cluttered, but also more vivid, engaging, and more intuitively comprehended. In addition, the learner does not have to interpret the auxiliary markings and try to infer the changes that they summarise. Such interpretation and inference may demand a level of graphicacy skills that the learner does not possess. With animated depictions, information about the changes involved is available to be read straight from the display without the learner needing to perform mental animation. It's a bit of an exaggeration, but it's more like being kissed instead of reading about a kiss.

Some animations challenge the learner's processing capacities

Research evidence about the educational effectiveness of animations is mixed. Various investigations have compared the educational effectiveness of static and animated displays across a number of content domains. While there have been some findings that show positive effects of animations on learning, other studies have found no effects or even negative effects. Some propose that the efficacy depends on the way the animation characteristics engage the psychological functioning of the learner. In general, it can be concluded that animations are not intrinsically more effective than static graphics. Rather, the particular characteristics of individual animations and how they are used play a key role in the effects that they have on learning.

== Speed of learning ==
Well-designed animations may help students learn faster and easier. They are also an aid to teachers when it comes to explaining difficult subjects. The difficulty of subjects may arise due to the involvement of mathematics or imagination. For instance, the electric current is invisible. The operation of electric circuits is difficult for students to understand at the beginning. With the aid of computer animations, learning and teaching might become easier, faster, and amusing.

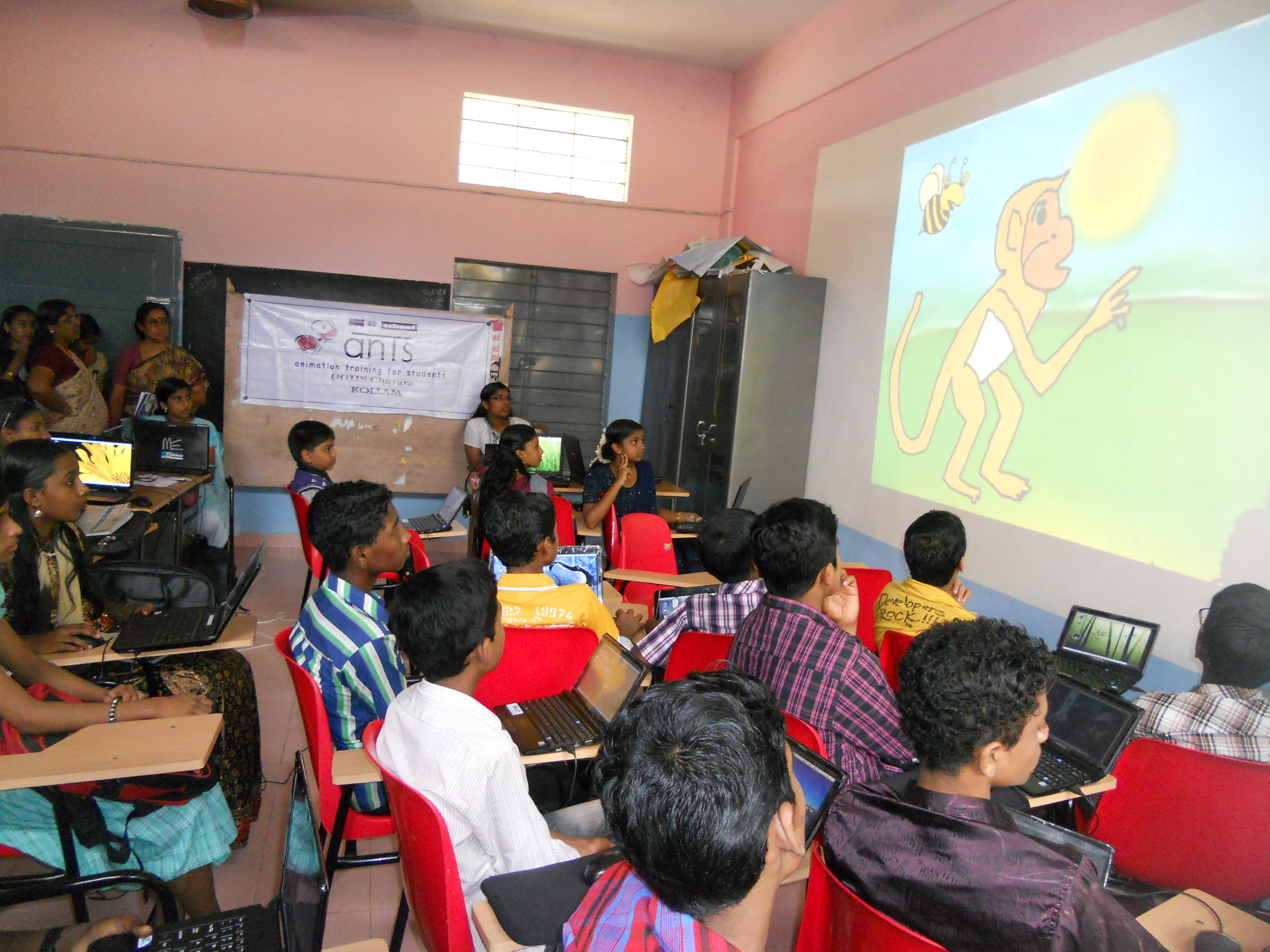
Animation training of ITschool1

According to V.M. Williamson and M.R. Abraham, animation helps students learn in two ways. It facilitates the creation of mental representations of concepts, phenomena, and processes and it also replaces difficult cognitive processes (e.g. abstraction, imagination). There are also studies that revealed that learning is facilitated as animation create positive attitude among the learners, leading to positive learning outcomes.

== Educational effectiveness ==
Animations may lack educational effectiveness if target learners can't process the presented information adequately. For example, it seems that when the subject matter is complex, learners may be overwhelmed by animated presentations. This is related to the role of visual perception and cognition in human information processing. Our human perceptual and cognitive systems have limited capacities for processing information. If these limits are exceeded, learning may be compromised. For example, the pace at which the animation presents its information may exceed the speed at which the learner can process it effectively. The accompanying animation (part of a pumping system) is problematic for this reason. But the solution is obvious: slow the animation down and accompany it with a written explanation. It is unlikely that superior learning is achieved by thoughtlessly substituting animation for a static graphic, but by having it accompany textual explication. Another suggestion for addressing such problems is to provide user control for the learner over how the animation plays. User-controllable animations allow learners to vary aspects such as the playing speed and direction, labels, and audio commentary to suit themselves.

== Perceptual salience versus thematic relevance ==
The complexity of the subject matter may not be the only reason for difficulties that learners sometimes have with animations. It seems that problems can also arise from the perceptual effects of such presentations. In a poorly designed animation, the information that learners notice most readily in the animation may not be the information that is of greatest importance. Conversely, information that is relatively inconspicuous may be very important.

The perceptibility of information does not necessarily correspond with its actual relevance to the learning task to be performed. Features of the animated display that are most conspicuous because of their contrast with the rest of the display are not always the best place for learners to direct their attention. In other words, there can be a poor correspondence between the perceptual salience ('noticeability') of a feature and its thematic relevance, and an accompanying text is needed to correct this.

This correspondence problem can occur with both static and animated graphics. On a purely perceptual level, our attention tends to be attracted by some parts of a static display more than by other parts due to their visuospatial properties. For example, an object that is centrally placed, relatively large, unusually shaped, and of a sharply contrasting colour or texture is likely to 'jump out' of the display so that we notice it very easily. Other items in the display may receive correspondingly less attention as a result. Well-designed static educational graphics take advantage of these perceptual effects. They manipulate the characteristics of the display in order to direct learner attention to the most relevant information. This helps to ensure that the learner will extract the required information from the display. There is a problem in the design of the animation shown above in this respect. Unfortunately, there are many 'educational' graphics being produced that fail to provide learners with sufficient support of this type. Designers of animation need to take such considerations into account.

== Dynamic contrast ==
The correspondence problems due to the perceptual characteristics of a display are compounded when we go from a static to an animated graphic. Because of their dynamic character, educational animations introduce a further challenge to information extraction beyond those found with static graphics. Certain aspects of a display that change over time have the potential to capture the learner's attention. If there is sufficient dynamic contrast between one or more items in the display and their surroundings, the effect can be very compelling in a perceptual sense. It seems that at a fundamental level, our perceptual system is attuned to detect and follow such changes, irrespective of their importance in terms of the subject matter. As with static displays discussed above, items that are perceptually compelling (in this case because of their dynamic character) may not necessarily be of great thematic relevance to the given learning task. The big orange float in the accompanying animation is far more perceptible than the small grey air valve because of both its visuospatial characteristics and its high level of dynamic contrast with the rest of the display.

The misleading effects of the dynamic contrast are likely to be particularly problematic for learners who lack background knowledge in the content domain depicted in an animation. These learners can be largely in the thrall of the animation's raw perceptual effects and so tend to process the presented information in a bottom-up manner. For example, their attention within the display is likely to be directed to items that have conspicuous dynamic characteristics. As a result, there is a danger that they will attend to unimportant information merely because it is perceptually compelling. However, learners who already have considerable domain-specific background knowledge are likely to be less influenced by perception alone. This is because their attention is also directed to a considerable extent by their knowledge of which aspects of the subject matter are of most relevance (irrespective of their perceptibility). As a result, their processing of information in the display has a more top-down character. In the pumping system animation example, the air valve would be noticed by those who are already familiar with pumps in general because their existing background knowledge would put them on the lookout for crucial (but visually insignificant) parts of the mechanism.

== See also ==
- Educational technology – Use of technology in education to enhance learning and teaching
- Educational research – Collection and analysis of evidence in the field of education
