= Alice Coleman =

British geographer (1923–2023)

- Born: Alice Mary Coleman; 8 June 1923; London, England
- Died: 2 May 2023 (aged 99); London, England
- Education: Birkbeck College (BA); University College London (MA, PhD)
- Scientific career
- Fields: Geography
- Workplaces: King's College London

Alice Mary Coleman (8 June 1923 – 2 May 2023) was a British geographer. A professor at King's College London, she was noted for directing the 1960s Second Land Use Survey of Britain, as well as for analyses of land use planning and urban design which have influenced the design of residential developments since the 1980s. She was a member of the Freedom Association.

== Background ==
Coleman was born in London and grew up in Broadstairs, Kent. She was educated at Clarendon House Grammar School, but her family could not afford to send her to university right away. After qualifying as a teacher, Coleman studied for a BA at Birkbeck College and an MA and PhD from University College London.

Coleman lived in Dulwich, London. She died on 2 May 2023, at the age of 99.

== Academic career ==
After working as a secondary school teacher, Coleman became a lecturer at the geography department of King's College London, eventually becoming professor in 1987 after other posts in Canada and Japan. She retired from full-time teaching in the 1990s.

=== Land Use Survey ===
In the 1960s Coleman took on the role of director of the Second Land Use Survey of Britain. This was the first comprehensive attempt to map the use of land since Dudley Stamp's survey of the 1930s. Around 120 sheets each covering 200 km^{2} were published.

Coleman's findings on the Land Use Survey led to an attack on the effectiveness of the planning system within the UK, which she considered responsible for much degraded land in the rural/urban fringe.

=== Urban design ===
As head of the Land Use Research Unit at King's in the 1980s, Coleman built on the work of architect Oscar Newman on the concept of defensible space. The unit studied indications of 'social malaise' (litter, vandalism, graffiti etc.) on post-war social housing developments in the inner London boroughs of Southwark and Tower Hamlets (visiting all 4,050 multi-storey blocks in these boroughs), and the Blackbird Leys estate in Oxford. These measures were correlated with various design features such as number of storeys, number of flats in a block etc.

The findings published as Utopia on trial (Coleman 1985) were controversial, with Newman suggesting that insufficient attention was paid to social factors interacting with the physical. Bill Hillier of the Bartlett School of Architecture argued that many of Coleman's findings on the link between large scale housing and social problems were a statistical artefact: simply put, large blocks have more litter than small because they are larger. Nevertheless, in 1991 the government provided £50 million to test the ideas in selected estates under Coleman's direction under the DICE (Design Improvement Controlled Experiment) project (see Coleman 1992). A significant proposal was the removal of overhead walkways linking blocks to reduce opportunities for crime, though the overall effectiveness of DICE, and the general effectiveness of physical design methods over social and economic measures remains controversial.

== Other interests ==
=== Graphicacy ===
With William Balchin Coleman coined the term graphicacy as a characterisation of cartographic and other visuo-spatial abilities, extending across the whole field of graphical communications: 'the intellectual skill necessary for the communication of relationships which cannot be successfully communicated by words or mathematical notation alone'.

=== Graphology ===
Coleman's interest in graphology included editing and contributing to Graphology magazine and writing a graphological thesaurus.

=== Literacy ===
In 2007, Coleman co-authored The Great Reading Disaster with Mona McNee. In it, they discuss the teaching of reading in primary schools, promoting the use of phonics. As a teacher in secondary modern schools in the 1940s prior to her career at King's College London, Coleman claimed to have encountered only one pupil in 1200 unable to read. In her opinion, by 2007's standards, perhaps 30 of these would be in special schools for people with learning disabilities and a further 300 illiterate.

== Selected bibliography ==
- Coleman, A. (1961). "The second land-use survey: Progress and prospect". Geographical Journal. 127 (2): 68–186. Bibcode:1961GeogJ.127..168C. doi:10.2307/1792894. JSTOR 1792894.
- Coleman, A & Maggs, K.R.A (1965), Land Use Survey Handbook, fourth (Scottish) Edition, Isle of Thanet Geographical Association
- Coleman, A.M & Lukehurst, C.T. (1967), British landscapes through maps, 10: East Kent: a description of the Ordnance Survey Seventh Edition One-Inch sheet 173. Geographical Association, ISBN 0-900395-22-2 (paperback ed)
- Coleman, A.M & Lukehurst, C.T. (1974), Field Studies for Schools, Rivingtons, ISBN 0-280-22910-0.
- Coleman, A. (1976). "Is Planning really necessary?". Geographical Journal. 142 (3): 411–430. Bibcode:1976GeogJ.142..411C. doi:10.2307/1795294. JSTOR 1795294.
- Coleman, A.M & Shaw, J.E. (1980), Field Mapping Manual, London: King's College, ISBN
- Coleman, A.M. (1985), Utopia on trial: Vision and reality in planned housing. London: Hilary Shipman
- Coleman, A, The Social consequences of Housing Design, ch. 7 of Robson, B (Ed), Managing the city: The Aims and Impacts of Urban Policy, Rowman & Littlefield, ISBN 0-389-20731-4
- Coleman, A., Coleman, D., Beresford, P. Melville-Ross, T. et al. (1988), Altered estates. London: Adam Smith Institute, 1988.
- Coleman, A. (1992a), 'The Dice Project', in 'High rise housing', special issue of Housing and Town Planning Review, London: National Housing and Town Planning Council
- Coleman, A., England, E., Latymer, Y. and Shaw, J.E. (1992), Scapes and Fringes 1:400,000 Environmental Territories of England and Wales, London: Second Land Utilisation Survey (2 maps and booklet)
- Coleman, Alice & McKnee, Mona (2007), The Great Reading Disaster: Reclaiming Our Educational Birthright, Exeter and Charlottesville VA: Imprint Academic, ISBN 978-1-84540-097-2

== Awards ==
The Royal Geographical Society presented Coleman with the Gill Memorial Award (1963) and Busk Medal (1987).
