= Land Utilisation Survey of Britain =

The Land Utilisation Survey of Britain (also Land Utilisation Survey of Great Britain) was a comprehensive survey of land use in Great Britain in the 1930s. The survey was the first such comprehensive survey in Britain since the Domesday Book survey in the 11th century. A Second Land Use Survey was carried out in the 1960s. Subsequent work has mainly been based on satellite imagery, with sample field survey work for quality checking.

== First Land Utilisation Survey ==
The first survey was instigated in the 1930s by L. Dudley Stamp, reader and later professor of geography at the London School of Economics.

Mapping was carried out by volunteers at the scale of six inches to the mile (1:10,560) using around 20,000 six-inch field maps. The maps were published at one inch to the mile (1:63,360) using the Ordnance Survey One Inch 'Popular Edition' (the 4th Edition) as the base. Publication of maps and reports began in 1933 and was completed in 1948 after interruption by World War II, though sheets were published in every year from 1933 to 1948 with the exception of 1941 (Stamp 1948). The printing plates of the pre-war maps were destroyed by bombing. Besides maps and regional summaries, publications leading from the survey included Stamp's 1937 and 1948 books The Land of Britain.

By comparison with later surveys the classification employed relatively few categories. The base-map was overprinted with a wash of six basic colours to indicate broad land-use categories: yellow (moorland and heath), light green (grassland), dark green (woodland), brown (arable), purple ('gardens etc.') and red (agriculturally unproductive). The key subdivided each of these by reference to the detail already present in the base-map, for example woodland into coniferous, deciduous, mixed and new plantations.

Built-up areas showed essentially only two categories of urban (red) and suburban (purple) land. The suburban and urban categories in combination with the base-map detail allowed the key to subdivide suburbs into 'houses with gardens sufficiently large to be productive of fruit, vegetables, flowers, etc.' and 'new housing areas, nurseries and allotments'. Urban areas were subdivided into 'land so closely covered with houses and other buildings as to be agriculturally unproductive' and 'yards, cemeteries, pits. quarries, tip heaps, new industrial works, etc.'.

All the one inch to one mile maps created by the Survey are available on-line for study at the Vision of Britain website created by the Great Britain Historical GIS, including the unpublished maps of upland Scotland which Stamp deposited with the Royal Geographical Society, plus the ten mile to one inch summary sheets. These maps are still the copyright of Stamp's estate, for 70 years after his death in 1966.

== Second Land Use Survey ==
In the 1960s a second survey was carried out by Alice Coleman, a geographer and later professor at Dudley Stamp's alma mater, King's College London. This followed Stamp's approach of the use of volunteers, with Coleman acknowledging 'generous encouragement and financial help from Professor Stamp'. The maps were published by the Isle of Thanet Geographical Association, with specific sheets receiving funding from local authorities such as Essex County Council.

Published maps were printed at a scale of 1:25,000 using the Ordnance Survey Provisional and First Series maps as a base. Pairs of 10x10km sheets were combined along the lines of the later Second Series (Pathfinder) maps. Coleman's survey employed a much more detailed classification than Stamp's in both urban and rural areas, giving 64 categories grouped into 13 groupings. The general colour scheme of Stamp's survey was followed (red, yellow, brown, purple, dark and light green), but red now signified industry rather than urban, and purple indicated market gardening and orchards rather than suburban. The new colours of grey (settlement), orange (transport) and lime green (parks and open spaces) were added. Besides solid colour the maps employed patterned colour (stipple, horizontal, diagonal and pecked lines etc.), and numeric and alphabetic symbols. In addition black stipple was used for derelict sites, white for unvegetated land (naturally bare rock etc. or stripped land awaiting development), and blue for water and marsh. Industry was subdivided into manufacturing (solid red) and extractive, tips and utilities using various patterns. Manufacturing was further divided by numbers indicating 14 groupings based on the Standard Industrial Classification as used in the 1951 census, for example 3 for glass, ceramics and cement, 6 for engineering and shipbuilding, 7 for vehicle manufacture, etc. Large transport uses (ports, airports, railway yards etc.) were indicated by orange stipple.

Rural uses were also subdivided using patterns: Market gardening into 10 categories ranging from 'field vegetables' to 'orchards with market gardening' and arable into 6 categories ranging from cereals to fallow. Heath, moorland and rough land (yellow wash) was overprinted with one or more of 16 symbols to indicate vegetation types.

Although around 3,000 volunteers completed much of the field work, coverage of only around 10% of the country was published at 1:25,000 due to printing problems. Nevertheless published sheets included the whole of Greater London and industrial Thames-side, giving a snap-shot of London at its peak as a centre of manufacturing.

The survey led to Coleman's later criticism of the planning system and work on the rural-urban fringe, for example Coleman (1977).

== Land Cover Map ==
Subsequent work has been based largely on remote sensing rather than field survey. The Land Cover Map of Great Britain (1990) was the first comprehensive survey since the Second Land Use Survey. This used satellite imagery, with ground survey used for checking. The end product is a digital dataset rather than paper mapping, providing classification of land cover types into 25 classes, at a 25m (or greater) resolution.

== Land-Use UK ==
In 1996 the Geographical Association organized a further field-based survey with the participation of around 50,000 school pupils. This originated as a 'Geography Action Week' and was carried out in co-operation with the Institute of Terrestrial Ecology, a forerunner of the Centre for Ecology and Hydrology, the body responsible for the satellite-based Land Cover Map. Mapping was carried out on the 1:10,000 scale using a stratified sample of a thousand 1 km^{2} squares, 500 urban and 500 rural.
