= Dudley Stamp =

British geographer

Laurence Dudley Stamp
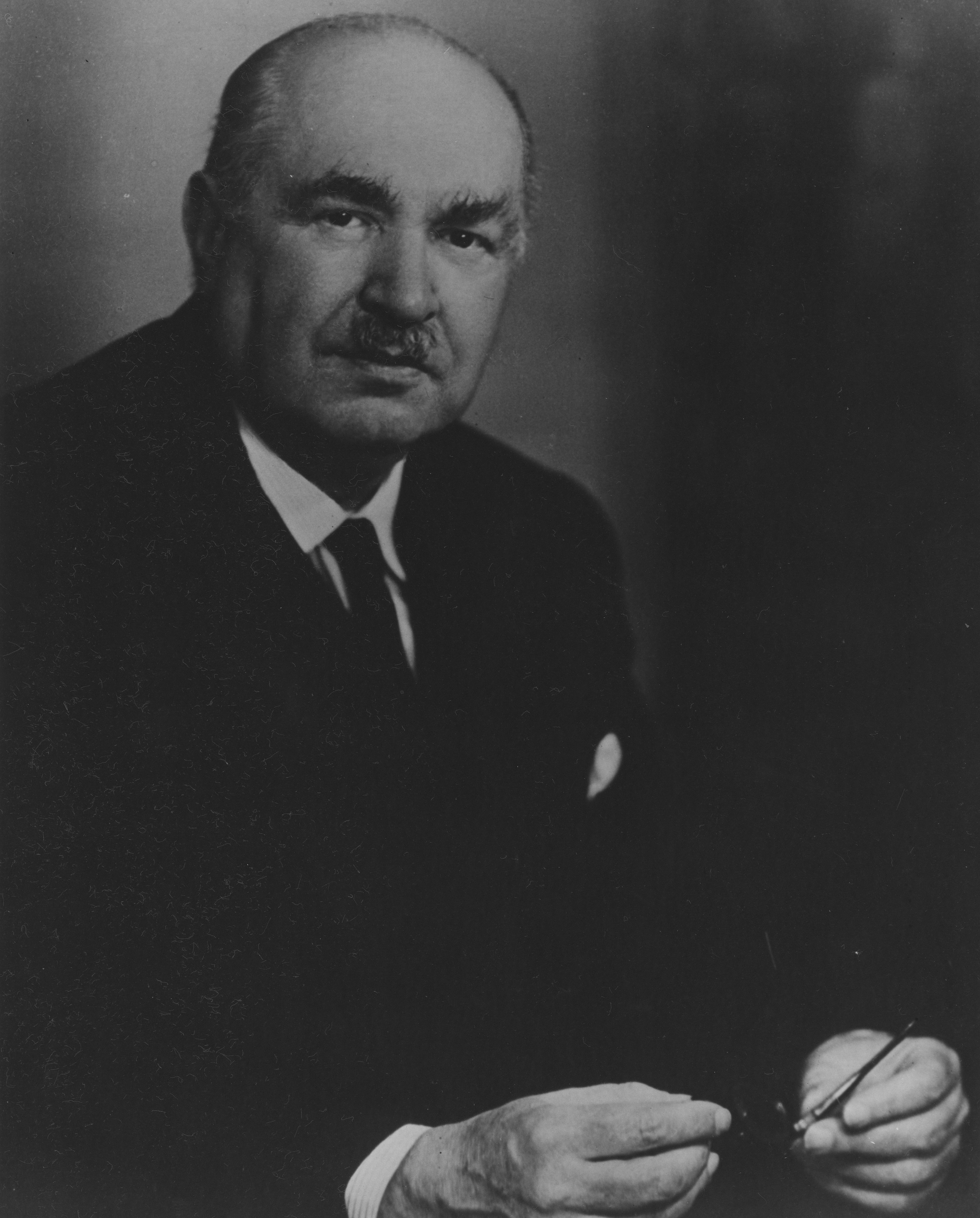
- Born: 9 March 1898; Catford, London, England
- Died: 8 August 1966 (aged 68); Mexico City, Mexico
- Occupation: Geographer
- Awards: Charles P. Daly Medal (1950)

Sir Laurence Dudley Stamp, CBE, (9 March 1898 – 8 August 1966), was professor of geography at Rangoon and London, and one of the internationally best known British geographers of the 20th century.

Educated at King's College London, he specialised in the study of geology and geography and taught at the universities of Rangoon (1923–26) and London (1926–45). From 1936 to 1944 he directed the compilation and publication of the report of the Land Utilisation Survey of Britain. He worked on many official enquiries into the use of land and planning.

He is considered one of the most famous British geographers of the twentieth century.

== Early life and education ==
Stamp was born in Catford, London, in 1898, the seventh child of a shopkeeper; his elder brother Josiah became the banker Lord Stamp of Shortlands. He attended University School, Rochester (1910–13), where he joined the Rochester and District Natural History Society. He then studied for a BSc at King's College London, graduating with first-class honours in 1917. Following military service he returned to King's as a demonstrator. His friendship with a student, his future wife Elsa Rea, led to an interest in geography. They both sat for the BA in 1921, Stamp again taking a first. He was awarded a DSc in the same year.

== World War I ==
Stamp served in the British Army during World War I in France and Belgium from 1917 to 1919. Whilst away his research paper on the Silurian of Clun Forest was read on his behalf to the Geological Society of London.

== Professional and academic career ==
Stamp spent the early 1920s as a petroleum geologist in the then British Empire colony of Burma, marrying and becoming professor of geology and geography in the new University of Rangoon in 1923. In 1926 he returned to the UK, becoming Reader in Economic geography at the London School of Economics (LSE).

In the 1930s Stamp formed the Land Utilisation Survey of Britain, a major project to survey of the whole country using volunteers including colleagues, students, school teachers and pupils, on a scale of 6 inches to a mile. Publication of maps and reports began in 1933 and was completed in 1948, after interruption by World War II. Stamp reported on the reaction of a farmer who came across a school class doing land-use survey on his land. Angry at first, the farmer was pacified by the explanation of the schoolmaster, and then later wrote approvingly to his local newspaper that this approach was valuable both to the pupils and the community. Stamp went on to act as a consultant to many national governments and prepared a general scheme for a world land use survey which was adopted by the International Geographical Union.

Stamp became professor of Economic geography in 1945 and moved to the chair of Social geography in 1948. Whilst at LSE Stamp held senior posts at many organisations, including presidency of section E of the British Association (1949), the Geographical Association (1950), the International Geographical Union (1952–56) and the Institute of British Geographers (1956), and vice-presidency of the Royal Society of Arts (1954–56).

He also acted as a government advisor – as vice-chairman of the Scott committee on land utilisation in rural areas (1941–42), as chief adviser on rural land utilisation in the Ministry of Agriculture (1942–55), developed the idea of land classification which was officially adopted for planning purposes and was a member of the Royal Commission on Common Land (1955–58). He retired in 1958.

He was entrusted with supervising Britain's land use survey in the 1930s. He died in Mexico City, Mexico.

== Retirement ==
Besides DIY work at home in Bude, Cornwall, Stamp acted as a director of the family grocery firm Cave Austin and Company Ltd and was president of the Institute of Grocers (1960–63). His work as a geographer and government advisor however was far from over. He was a member of the Nature Conservancy from 1958, chairman of the British National Committee for Geography (1961–66) and president of the Royal Geographical Society (1963–66). Stamp's wife Elsa died in 1962. In 1964 he chaired the organising committee of the Twentieth International Geographical Union Congress in London; a keen philatelist, he successfully argued for a set of commemorative stamps. In 1965 he chaired the National Resources Advisory Committee of the Ministry of Land and Natural Resources. Stamp died of heart failure in 1966 at a conference in Mexico City; he is reputed to have just completed a quest to visit every country in the world. He was buried in Bude.

== Legacy ==
Much of the development of government policy for land-use control in Britain may be traced back to Stamp's land utilisation survey and analysis of land-use changes.

=== Second Land-use survey ===
A second land utilisation survey was initiated by Alice Coleman (later professor of geography at Stamp's alma mater King's College London) in 1960, following Stamp's approach of the use of volunteers. Although around 3000 volunteers completed much of the field work, only a limited amount was published at 1:25,000 due to printing problems.

=== Land-Use UK ===
In 1996 the Geographical Association organized a further survey with the participation of around 50,000 school pupils.

=== Dudley Stamp Memorial Fund ===
The Royal Geographical Society's Dudley Stamp Memorial Fund provides small grants for geographers to assist them in postgraduate research or study travel likely to lead to the advancement of geography and to international co-operation in the study of the subject.

=== Stamp Papers ===
The Stamp Papers, held at the department of geography, University of Sussex, contain much information on his organisation of the Land Use Survey, together with personal and professional papers which illustrate his life and career.

== Selected published works ==
- (1919), "The highest Silurian rocks of the Clun-Forest District" (Shropshire). Quarterly Journal of the Geological Society LXXIV-3 (295); pp. 221–246.
- (1925), The Vegetation of Burma from an Ecological Standpoint. Calcutta: Thacker, Spink & Co.
- (1927), "Wandlungen in Welthandelsverkehr: Atlantischer oder Stiller Ozean?" (Changes in World Trade Flows: Atlantic or Pacific Ocean?); Zeitschrift für Geopolitik, 4 (12), 1927, pp. 64–66. (in German, English translation by Rolf Meyer to be published 2009).
- (1929), The World: A General Geography, London: Longmans, Green & Co.
- (1930? to 1932), The New Age Geographies Junior Series (with his wife Elsa C. Stamp) and the New Age Geographies Senior Series for schools.
- (1933), ed. Slovene Studies: Being Studies Carried Out by Members of the Le Play Society in the Alpine Valleys of Slovenia (Yugoslavia).
- (1937), ed. The Land of Britain. The Report of the Land Utilisation Survey of Britain, London: Geographical Publications.
- (1940), "The Southern Margin of the Sahara: Comments on Some Recent Studies on the Question of Desiccation in West Africa"; Geographical Review, Vol. 30, No. 2, pp. 297–300.
- (1946), Britain's Structure And Scenery, London: Collins. (New Naturalist Library series)
- (1946), Physical Geography and Geology, London: Longmans Green and Co.
- (1947), The British Isles a Geographic and Economic Survey, London: Longmans Green and Co. (with Stanley H. Beaver)
- (1948), The Land of Britain: Its Use and Misuse. London: Longmans, Green and Co.
- (1949), with G. H. T. Kimble, An Introduction to Economic Geography, Toronto, New York and London: Longmans, Green and Co.
- (1951), ed. with Wooldridge S.W., London Essays in Geography. London: Longmans, Green & Co. (for London School of Economics)
- (1952), Land for Tomorrow: the Underdeveloped World, Bloomington: Indiana University Press.
- (1955), Man and the Land, London: Collins. (New Naturalist Library series)
- (1957), India, Pakistan, Ceylon and Burma, London: Metheun & Co. Ltd.
- (1959), A Regional Geography, Part I: The Americas. (9th ed 1959), Longman.
- (1960), Applied Geography. Harmondsworth, Middlesex: Penguin.
- (1961), A Glossary of Geographical Terms, London: Longmans, ISBN 0-582-31062-8
- (1961), ed. A History of Land Use in Arid Regions, UNESCO Arid Zone Research Publication XVII, Paris: UNESCO.
- (1962), The Land of Britain: Its use and misuse. 3rd enlarged ed.
- (1962), Britain's Structure And Scenery, Fontana. reprint of original 1946 title
- (1963), with Hoskins, W.G., The Common Lands of England and Wales, London: Collins. (New Naturalist Library Series)
- (1964), The Geography of Life and Death, London: The Fontana Library
- (1969), Nature Conservation in Britain, London: Collins. (New Naturalist Library series)
- (1969), Our Developing World, London: Faber and Faber, ISBN 0-571-04639-8.

== Awards ==
Stamp was appointed CBE in 1946 and knighted in 1965. He received the Daniel Pidgeon award of the Geological Society (1920) and the gold medal of the Mining and Geological Institute of India (1922). Later he received the Founder's Medal of the Royal Geographical Society (1949), the American Geographical Society's Charles P. Daly Medal (1950), the Swedish Society for Anthropology and Geography's Vega medal (1954), the Tokyo Geographical Society's medal (1957) and the Royal Scottish Geographical Society's Scottish Geographical Medal (1964). The Town Planning Institute elected him to honorary membership in 1944. Honorary degrees included LLD from Edinburgh (1963) and DSc from Exeter (1965).
